= Haberman station =

Train station in New York City (1892–1998)

Haberman
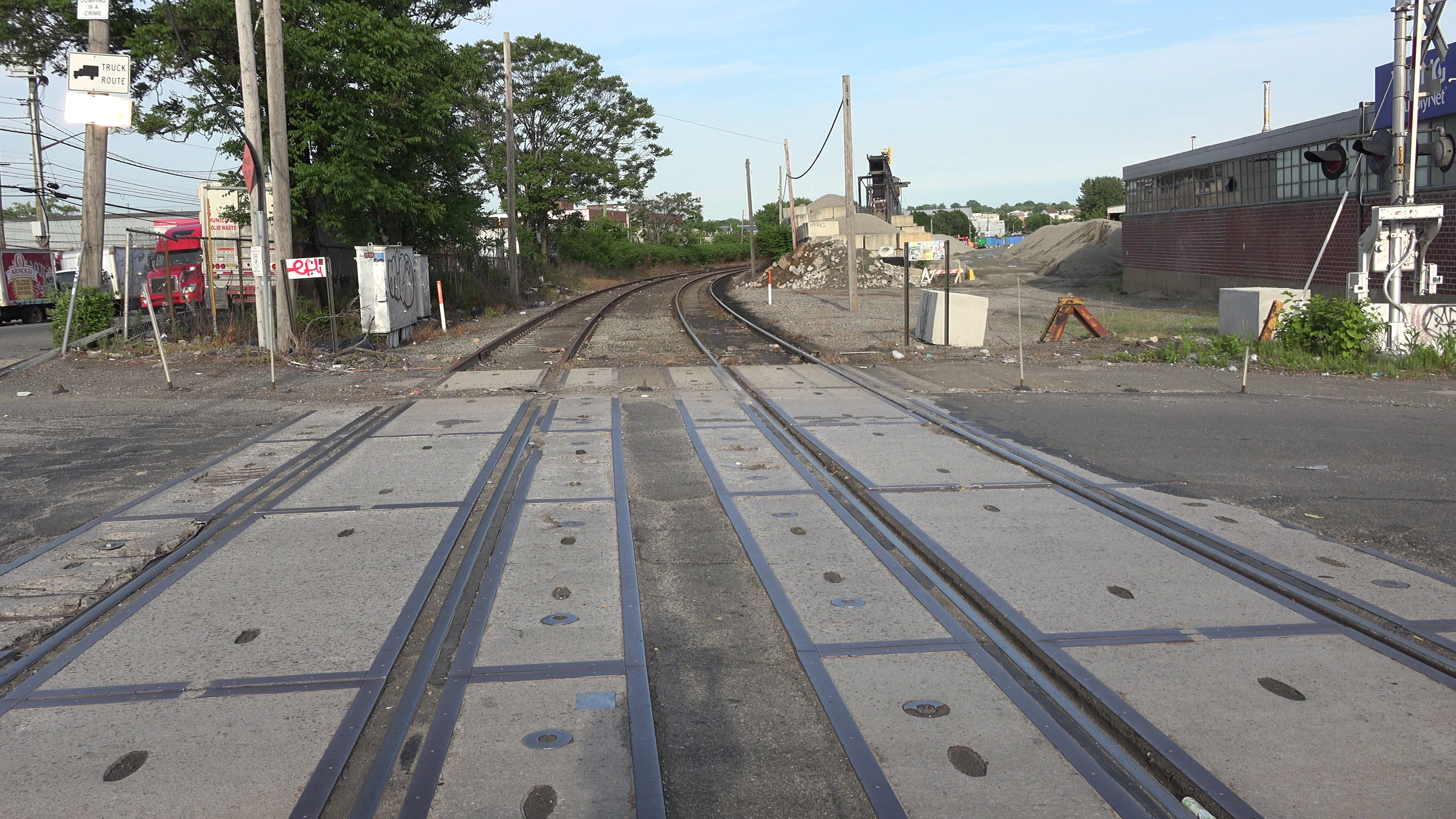
- The site of the former Haberman Station, on 49th Place south of Rust Street, facing east

General information
- Location: 56-50 49th Street (approximate)
- Coordinates: 40.725844°N 73.918377°W
- Owner: Long Island Rail Road
- Line: Montauk Branch
- Platforms: 2 side platforms
- Tracks: 2

History
- Opened: September 1892
- Closed: March 16, 1998
- Electrified: August 29, 1905

Services
Preceding station	Long Island Rail Road	Following station
Laurel Hill toward Long Island City	Montauk Branch	Maspeth toward Montauk
Location

Haberman was a station along the Long Island Rail Road's Lower Montauk Branch that was located at the intersection of Rust Street and 50th Street in Maspeth, Queens. The station is named after the Haberman Steel Enamel Works in Berlin village.

Haberman opened in September 1892 (by some accounts effectively replacing Laurel Hill station, which had until then been situated only a short distance to west) to serve the Haberman Manufacturing Company; service was furnished by the Long Island City–East New York rapid-transit trains. Around 1910 the station had low-level wooden platforms, but there never was a station building. The station still had manual railroad crossing gates and a guard shack as recently as 1973. Average daily westbound ridership at the station in 1997 having been 3, it was closed on March 16, 1998, along with Penny Bridge, Fresh Pond, Glendale, and Richmond Hill stations. In January 2018, Haberman was one of 8 stations on the Lower Montauk Branch that were considered for reopening in a study sponsored by the New York City Department of Transportation.

On some maps, presumably as a result of error in digitizing a USGS map, Haberman mistakenly appears as the name of a neighborhood, corresponding to an industrialized area of Maspeth. Google Maps removed the name in 2019.
