= Morris Park Facility =

Railroad maintenance facility in Queens, New York

Bolands Landing LIRR Employees Only
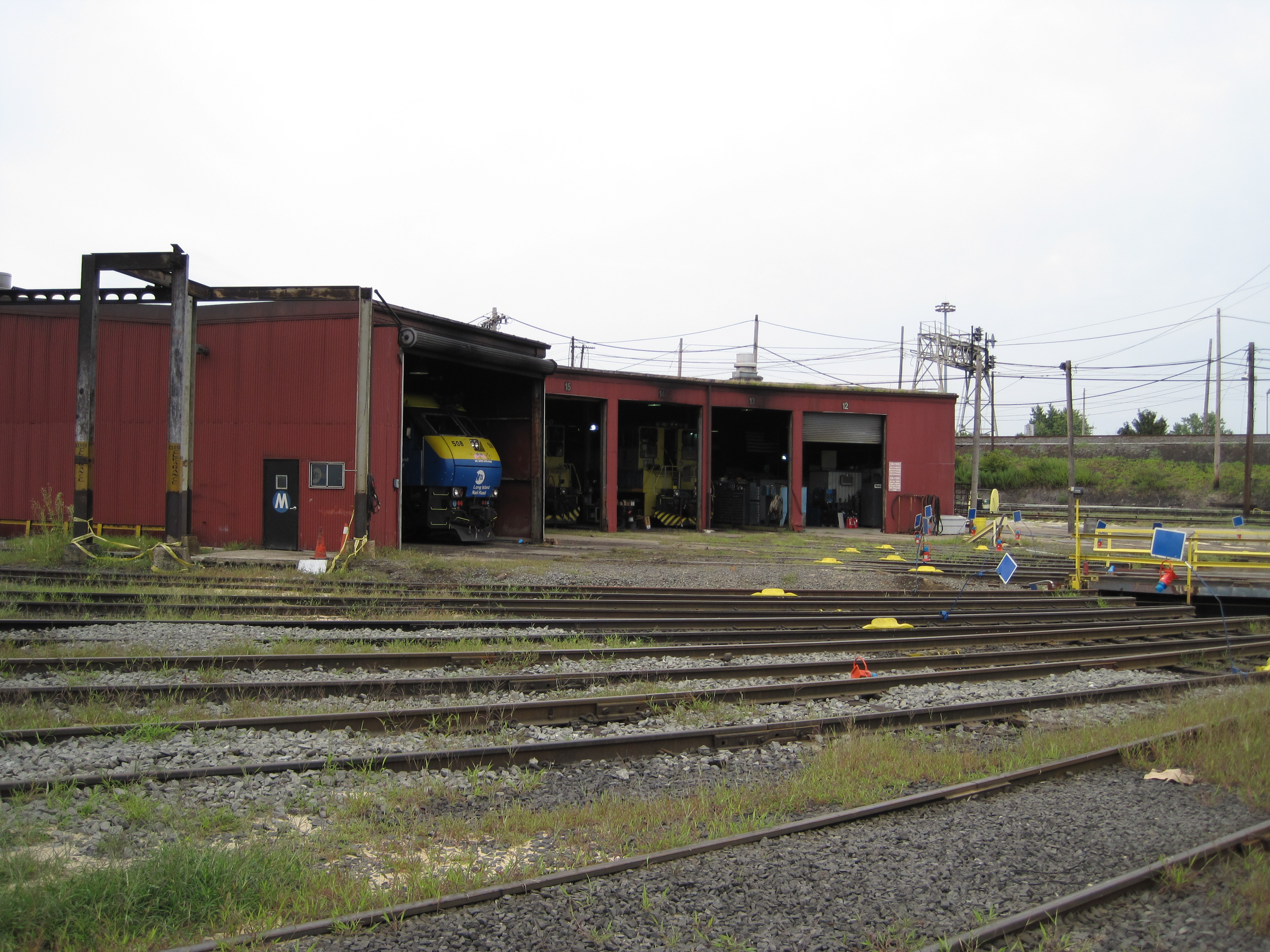
- The roundhouse and turntable.

General information
- Location: Richmond Hill, Queens, New York
- Coordinates: 40°41′45″N 73°49′19″W
- Owner: Long Island Rail Road
- Line: Atlantic Branch
- Platforms: 2 side platforms (LIRR employees only)
- Tracks: 2
- Connections: None

Construction
- Parking: Employees only

Other information
- Station code: BOL

History
- Opened: 1886 (Passenger station); 1889 (Maintenance yard)
- Closed: 1939 (Passengers only)
- Rebuilt: 2009
- Electrified: 750 V (DC) third rail

Former passenger services
Preceding station	Long Island Rail Road	Following station
Clarenceville toward Atlantic Terminal	Atlantic Branch	Dunton toward Valley Stream
Richmond Hill toward Long Island City	Montauk Branch	Dunton toward Montauk
Location

The Morris Park Facility is a maintenance facility of the Long Island Rail Road in Queens, New York City. It includes two employee-only side platforms on the Atlantic Branch named Boland's Landing. Two wooden platforms, each two cars long, exist on the two-track line, with a flashlight for workers to signal trains to stop.

The facility opened on November 1, 1889. Though used for train storage for over a century, it is mainly used for maintaining and refueling diesel locomotives and electro-diesel locomotives since the 1990s. The locomotive roundhouse was renovated in 2018, with construction being completed in late 2020.

== Description ==
The Morris Park Facility covers about 21 acres (8.5 ha), and contains a locomotive shed and sidings for diesel locomotives and dual-mode electro-diesel locomotives. Originally it included a 23-stall brick locomotive roundhouse, an electric turntable, maintenance offices, and locomotive watering facilities. A smaller roundhouse and turntable, as well as a separate four-track shed, now exist on the site. The facility also includes storage and receiving yards; maintenance shops; and a train-car wash.

The Morris Park Facility contains the Morris Park Locomotive Shop, a locomotive shed that is used to store the EMD DE30AC and DM30AC locomotives used on the LIRR. The shop contains one of four remaining turntables left on the LIRR. Riverhead has one on the grounds of the Railroad Museum of Long Island, and Oyster Bay and Greenport yards have the others. The Morris Park turntable is the only one of the turntables still functioning; those in Oyster Bay, Riverhead, and Greenport exist purely for historical purposes.

== History ==
The original Morris Park station was an 1886-built pedestrian depot located on 120th Street that served as a replacement for 1878-built Morris Grove station on 124th Street. It was torn down in 1939 as part of a grade elimination project for the Atlantic Branch. The yard's locomotive yard office and engine shops, divided into the front shops and back shops, were built in 1889, at the junction of the Atlantic and Lower Montauk Branches approximately on the opposite side of the former "R" Tower at the latter day Richmond Hill Storage Yard. The yard also featured a turntable for spinning engines. The yard was used for train storage until the 1990s; now, it is primarily used to maintain and refuel diesel locomotives.

In 2009, part of the back shops (the engine shops not located directly off the turntable) were demolished as part of a reconstruction project, however, the front shops and yard office from 1889 still exist.

=== Morris Grove station ===
Morris Grove station was originally a South Side Railroad of Long Island station house located at Berlin Station that was moved to 124th Street in 1878 and renamed "Morris Grove." The station was later renamed "Morris Park," for a park that was located behind the depot, and closed in 1886 to be replaced by the "new" Morris Park station on Atlantic Avenue between Lefferts Boulevard and 120th Street.

The Morris Park station was in service until 1939, when it was closed as part of the grade elimination project that replaced the surface railway with a tunnel beneath Atlantic Avenue. Efforts by local residents and elected officials to allow for an underground Morris Park station were rejected by construction coordinator Robert Moses.

=== Shops station ===
Shops station was a sheltered shed on the Lower Montauk Branch built approximately in 1900 for LIRR employees of the Morris Park facility when the lower Montauk Branch was still an at-grade line. The station was located approximately opposite of the former site of the "R" Tower where the Richmond Hill Storage Yard was located. No evidence of the existence of the station can be found beyond May 1913.

=== Locomotive shop reconstruction ===
Prior to reconstruction in 2018–2020, many of the Morris Park Locomotive Shop's structures had been originally built along with the rest of the facility in 1889. In May 2018, a contract to rebuild the shop was awarded to a joint venture of Railroad Construction Company Inc. and AMCC Corp. The project was completed in November 2020 at a cost of nearly $102 million. The original completion date was January 2020, but the completion was delayed because a new turntable contractor had been hired.
