= Clarenceville station =

Clarenceville station may refer to:

- Clarenceville station (LIRR)
- Richmond Hill station (LIRR) or Clarenceville station
