= Maspeth station =

Maspeth station may refer to:

- Maspeth station (Flushing Railroad)
- Maspeth station (LIRR)
