= Penny Bridge station =

Train station in New York City (1854–1998)

Penny Bridge
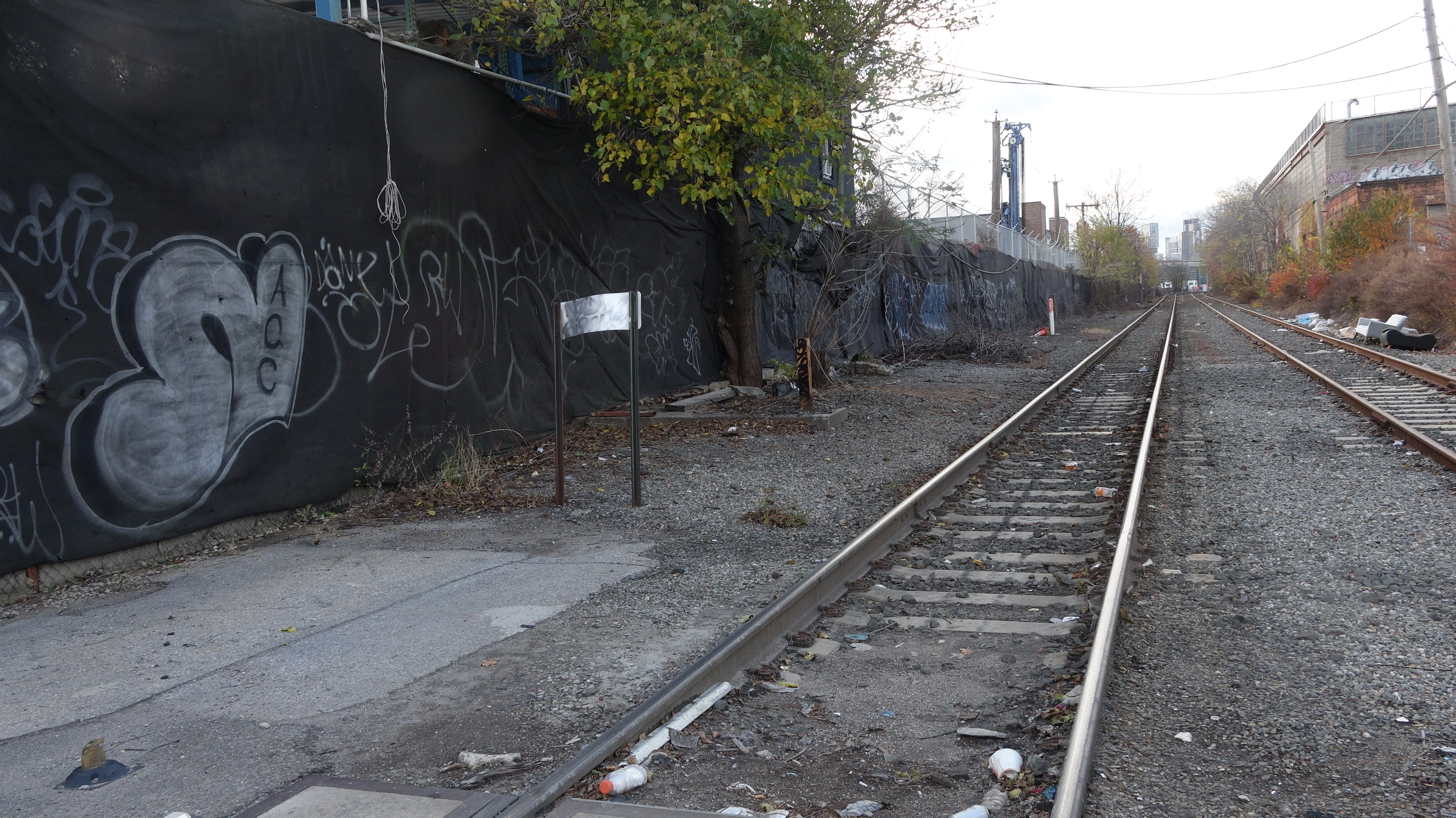
- Former site of the Penny Bridge station

General information
- Other names: Calvary Cemetery
- Location: north of Laurel Hill Boulevard and Review Avenue; Long Island City, Queens, New York
- Coordinates: 40°43′44.4″N 73°55′53″W
- Owner: Long Island Rail Road
- Line: Montauk Branch
- Platforms: 2 side platforms
- Tracks: 2

History
- Opened: June 26, 1854; August 6, 1870; June 2, 1883
- Closed: November 14, 1869; July 30, 1880; March 16, 1998
- Electrified: August 29, 1905

Former services
Preceding station	Long Island Rail Road	Following station
Long Island City Terminus	Montauk Branch	Laurel Hill toward Montauk
Preceding station	Flushing Railroad	Following station
Hunter's Point Terminus	New York and Flushing Railroad	Maspeth Closed 1858 toward Winfield Junction
Location

Penny Bridge was a station along the Long Island Rail Road's Lower Montauk Branch that runs from Long Island City to Jamaica, Queens, in the state of New York. During its existence, the station served local industry as well as the Calvary Cemetery. Before the Kosciuszko Bridge was built, it also served businesses on the Brooklyn side of Newtown Creek (the name referring to the bridge that formerly connected Laurel Hill Boulevard to Meeker Avenue before it was closed in 1939) prior to the closure and removal of the bridge.

== History ==
This station first opened on June 26, 1854, by the Flushing Railroad to serve Calvary Cemetery. The Flushing Railroad was purchased by the New York and Flushing Railroad in April 1859. The station, in June 1859, was renamed Calvary Cemetery. The station closed on November 14, 1869. After the line was acquired by the South Side Railroad of Long Island in 1869 the station reopened on August 6, 1870. The Long Island Rail Road purchased the line in 1874 and consolidated the line into its system in 1876. The station was closed on July 30, 1880, before reopening on June 2, 1883. The station would close permanently on March 16, 1998, along with Haberman, Glendale, Fresh Pond and Richmond Hill stations due to very low ridership and incompatibility with the C3 cars that were to be introduced into service around the time of closure. Around that time, the station served an average of one passenger per day.

== Station layout ==
The station had two low-level side platforms beside each track, both consisted merely of long areas of ballast marked as platforms. The eastbound platform had a small blue wooden shelter with signs to indicate the name and location of the station.
