= EMD DE30AC and DM30AC =

Long Island Rail Road locomotive

EMD DE30AC/DM30AC
- DM30AC 513 at Jamaica station in 2025
Type and origin
- Power type: Diesel-electric (DE30AC); Dual mode (DM30AC)
- Builder: General Motors Electro-Motive Division (EMD)
- Model: DE30AC, DM30AC
- Build date: 1997–1999
- Total produced: 46
Specifications
- Configuration
  - AAR: B-B
  - UIC: Bo′Bo′
  - Commonwealth: Bo-Bo
- Gauge: 4 ft 8 1/2 in (1,435 mm) standard gauge
- Wheel diameter: 44 in (1,118 mm)
- Minimum curve: 135 ft (41 m) radius/ 43.5° (single unit); 240 ft (73 m) radius/ 23° (coupled)
- Wheelbase: Locomotive: 46 ft 2 in (14.07 m) (between truck centers); Truck: 9 ft 6 in (2.90 m)
- Length: 75 ft 0 in (22.86 m)
- Width: 10 ft 1 in (3.07 m)
- Height: 14 ft 4 in (4.37 m)
- Axle load: 75,000 lb (34,019 kg) Max
- Adhesive weight: 100%
- Loco weight: DE30AC (400–403): 296,878 lb (134,662 kg); DE30AC (404–422): 291,735 lb (132,329 kg); DM30AC: 299,844 lb (136,007 kg)
- Fuel type: Diesel (DE); Diesel and electric (DM)
- Fuel capacity: DE: 3,000 US gal (11,000 L); DM: 2,400 US gal (9,100 L)
- Lubricant cap.: 215 US gal (810 L)
- Coolant cap.: 210 US gal (790 L)
- Sandbox cap.: 10 cu ft (280 L) (Front); 5 cu ft (140 L) (Rear)
- Electric system/s: Third rail, 750 V DC (DM only)
- Current pickup: Contact shoe (DM only)
- Prime mover: EMD 12N-710G3B-EC
- RPM range: 434–904
- Engine type: 45° V12, two stroke cycle
- Aspiration: Mechanically-assisted Turbocharger
- Displacement: 8,520 cu in (139.6 L)
- Alternator: EMD TA12-QBE
- Traction motors: 4 × Siemens 1TB2624-0TA02 720 hp (540 kW)
- Cylinders: 12
- Cylinder size: 710 cu in (11.63 L)
- Transmission: AC-DC-AC
- MU working: Yes
- Train heating: Locomotive-supplied head-end power
- Loco brake: KNORR CCB1 (26C)
- Train brakes: KNORR CCB1 (26C)
- Safety systems: Cab signalling, ATC
Performance figures
- Maximum speed: 100 mph (160 km/h) (diesel); 80 mph (130 km/h) (electric) (92:19 gear ratio)
- Power output: Diesel: 3,000 hp (2,237 kW); Electric: 2,880 hp (2,150 kW) (DM30AC only); Max @ Rail: 2,873 hp (2,142 kW)
- Tractive effort: Starting: 80,000 lbf (356 kN); Continuous: 60,000 lbf (267 kN) @20 mph (32.2 km/h)
- Factor of adh.: ~3.7
- Brakeforce: 30,000 lbf (133 kN) from 40 mph (64.4 km/h) to 35 mph (56.3 km/h) (electric mode) or 15 mph (24.1 km/h) (diesel mode)
Career
- Operators: Long Island Rail Road
- Number in class: 24 (DE30AC); 20 (DM30AC)
- Numbers: 400–423 (DE30AC); 500–522 (DM30AC)
- Disposition: Operational, two units retired from wrecks

The EMD DE30AC and DM30AC are a class of 46 locomotives built between 1997–1999 by Electro-Motive Division in the Super Steel Plant in Schenectady, New York, for the Long Island Rail Road of the Metropolitan Transportation Authority (MTA) in New York. Originally divided equally between the two types, the fleet currently consists of 24 DE30AC locomotives (diesel power only) and 20 DM30AC locomotives (diesel or third rail power).

== Details ==
The DE30AC and DM30AC locomotives replaced aging GP38-2 locomotives, with GP38s used to push and pull diesel trains and other locomotives converted into power packs (cab control) used to provide head-end power for the trains. The bodies of the DE30AC and the DM30AC are extremely similar; the difference is the ability of the DM30AC to use electric third rail while the diesel engine is off, enabling the locomotive to use the East River Tunnels into New York Penn Station. This permits direct service from non-electrified lines in eastern Long Island via the western electrified main lines all the way to Penn Station. A few such trains a day run on the Port Jefferson, Montauk, and Oyster Bay branches, usually during peak times. Due to their height, the DE30AC and DM30AC locomotives, as well as the C3 bilevel railcars that they typically haul, cannot fit through the 63rd Street Tunnel, and are thus unable to serve Grand Central Madison station.

Single engines run with six cars or fewer, in which case the engine is on the east end of the train and a C3 cab car is on the west (Manhattan-facing) end. Generally, two engines are used when there are seven or more cars. Running in electric mode requires two DM30ACs per train regardless of train length.

== Accidents ==
- DM30AC 503 was damaged in an accident at Huntington on October 23, 2000, when a defective shoe beam caused a 750-volt short circuit with the locomotive's third rail contact shoe, which in turn caused the locomotive to catch fire. It sat in the LIRR's Morris Park Facility and had been stripped for spare parts to maintain the remainder of the fleet until July 2018, when it was scrapped.
- DM30AC 511 was damaged in an accident on May 25, 2019. It hit a 14-unit long train stopped at the siding east of Speonk station, which is 13 units long; this caused the locomotive to lose a third rail shoe and sustain frame damage. It is now sitting in the Morris Park Facility, most likely to be used for parts before being scrapped.

In addition, DM30AC 507 suffered an electrical cabinet failure. Unlike 503 and 511, it was salvaged by being converted into a DE30AC locomotive, renumbered to 423, and returned to service.

== Planned replacement ==
In December 2020, the Metropolitan Transportation Authority of New York board approved a Federal Transit Administration-funded $335 million contract for 27 dual-mode locomotives, based on the Siemens Charger design. The order also includes additional options for up to 144 more locomotives, of which 66 could go to the LIRR. As a part of the Long Island Rail Road's Capital Program, the railroad is exercising Option 3 of the previously awarded contract to order up to 44 new dual-mode Siemens Charger locomotives, which would likely replace the older DE30AC and DM30AC locomotives.

== Gallery ==
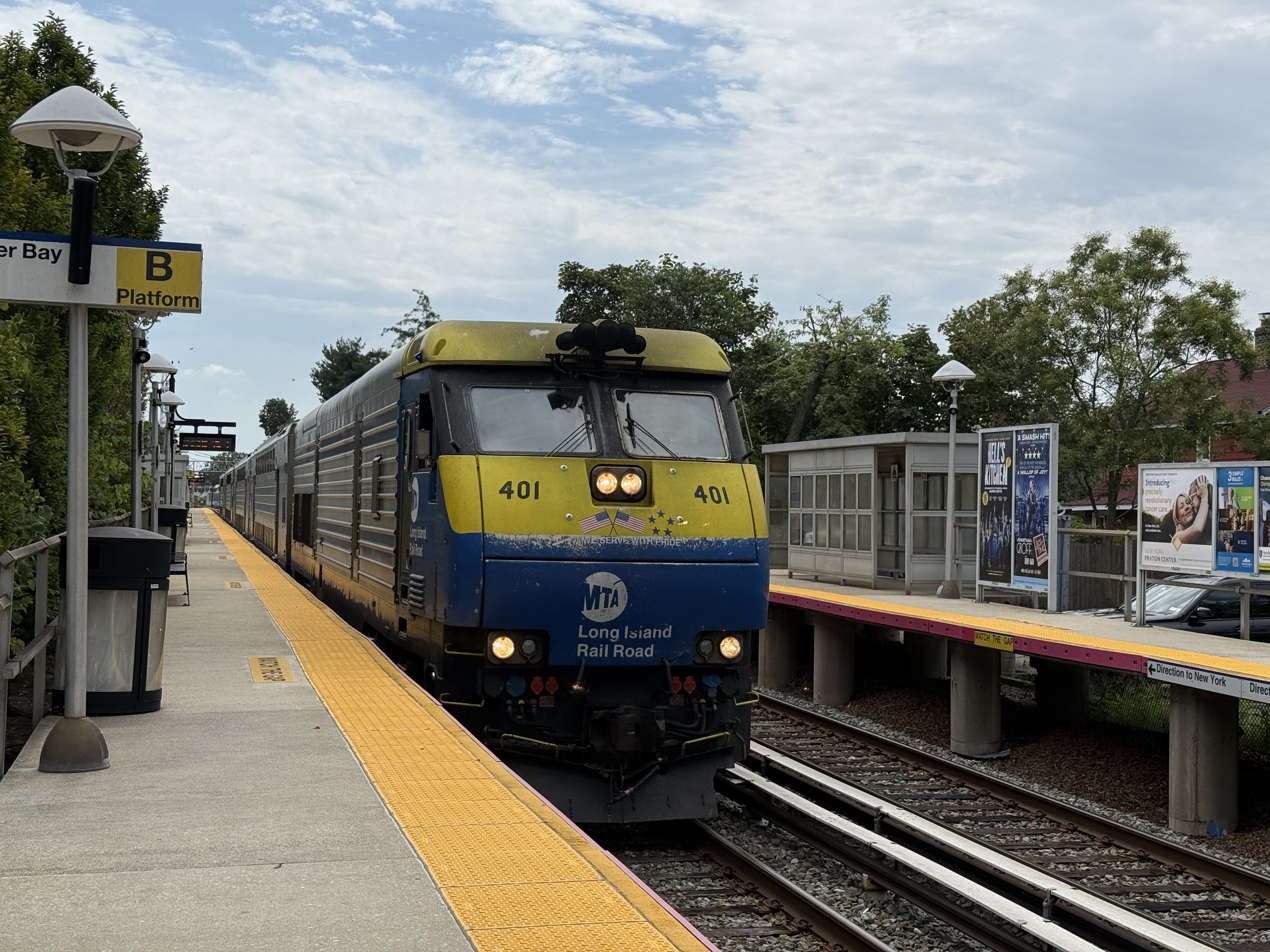
DE30AC No. 401 at East Williston station

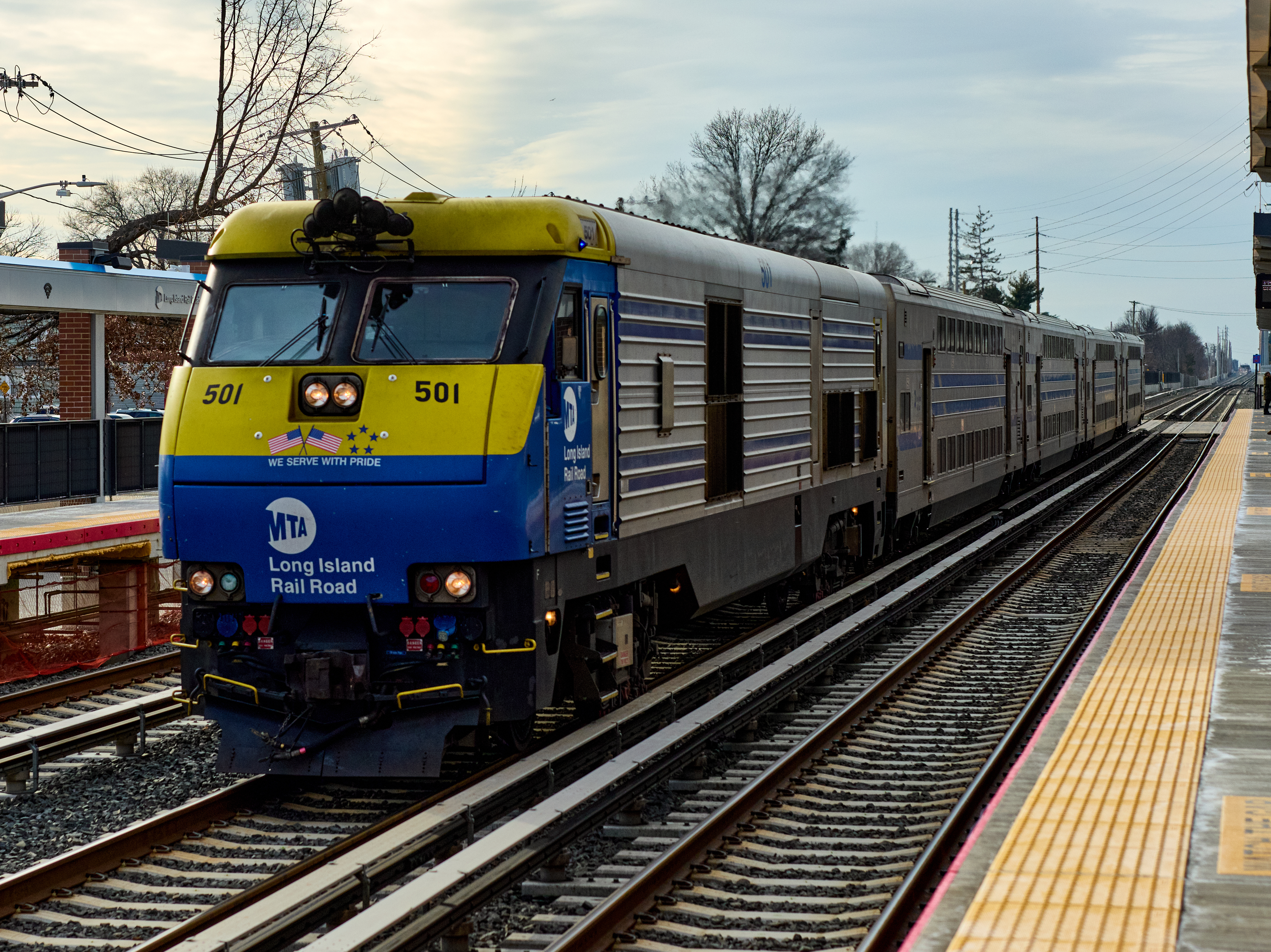
DM30AC No. 501 at New Hyde Park station

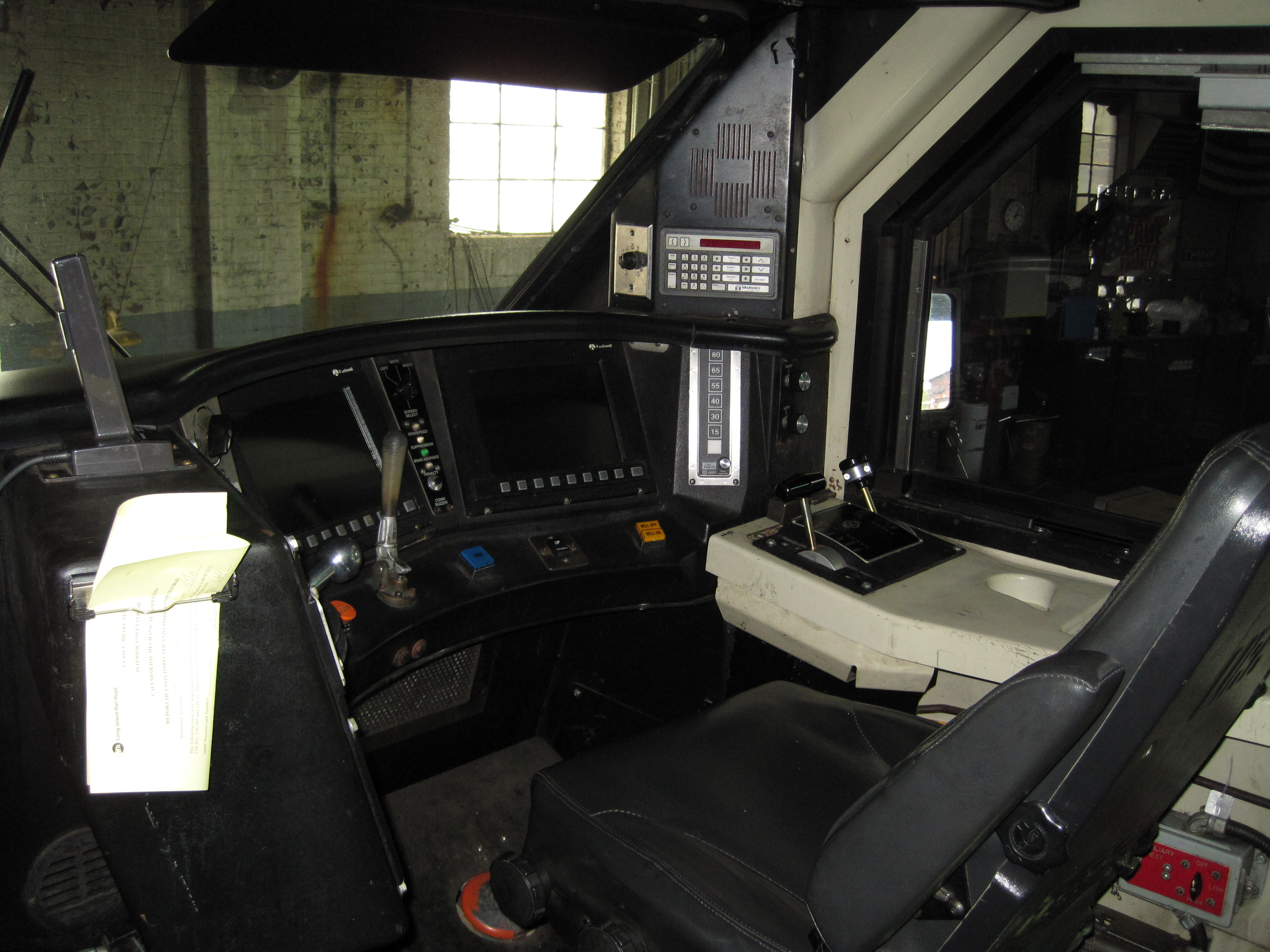
The cab of engine No. 513

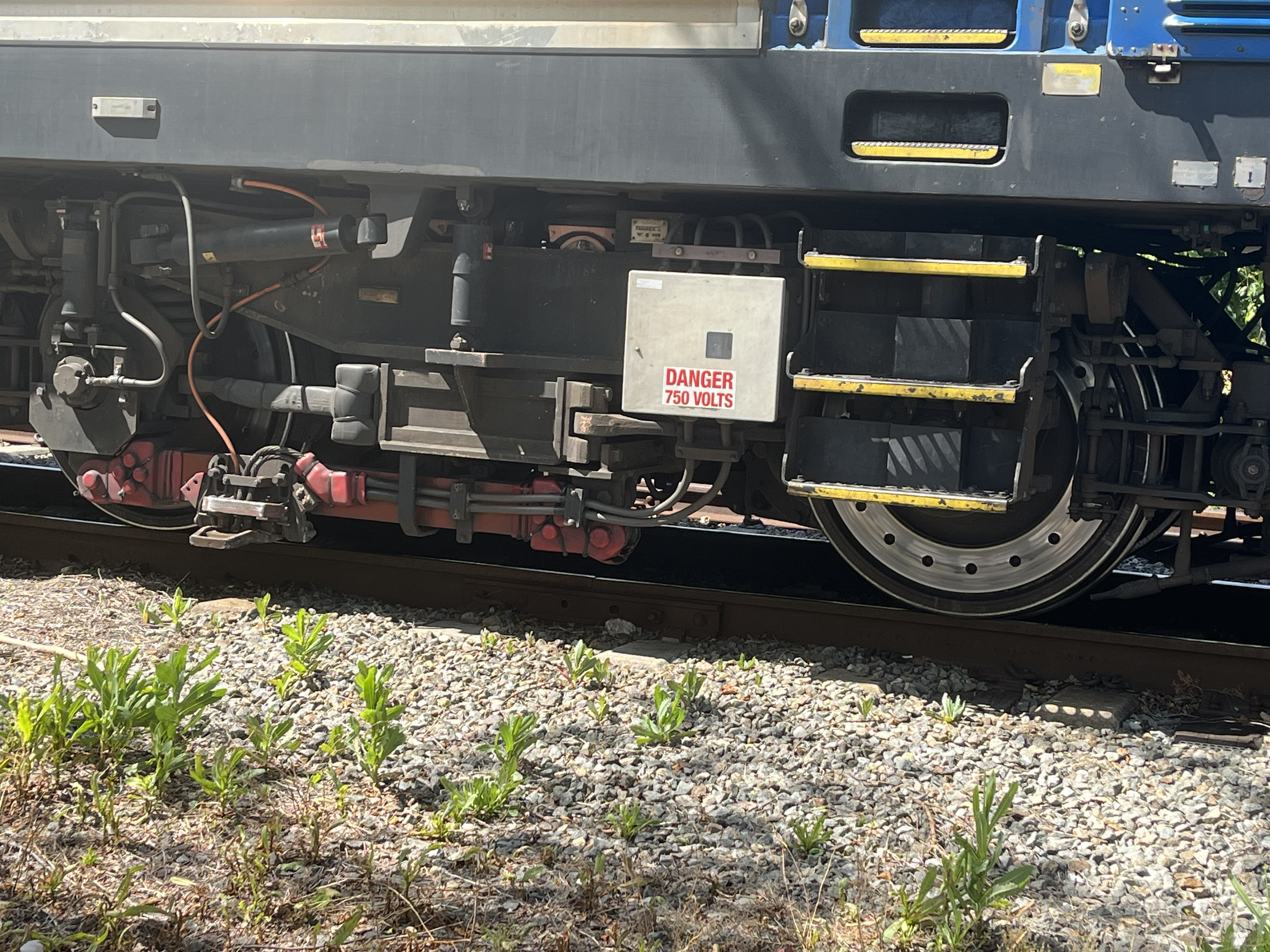
Third rail conductor shoe on DM30AC No. 514.

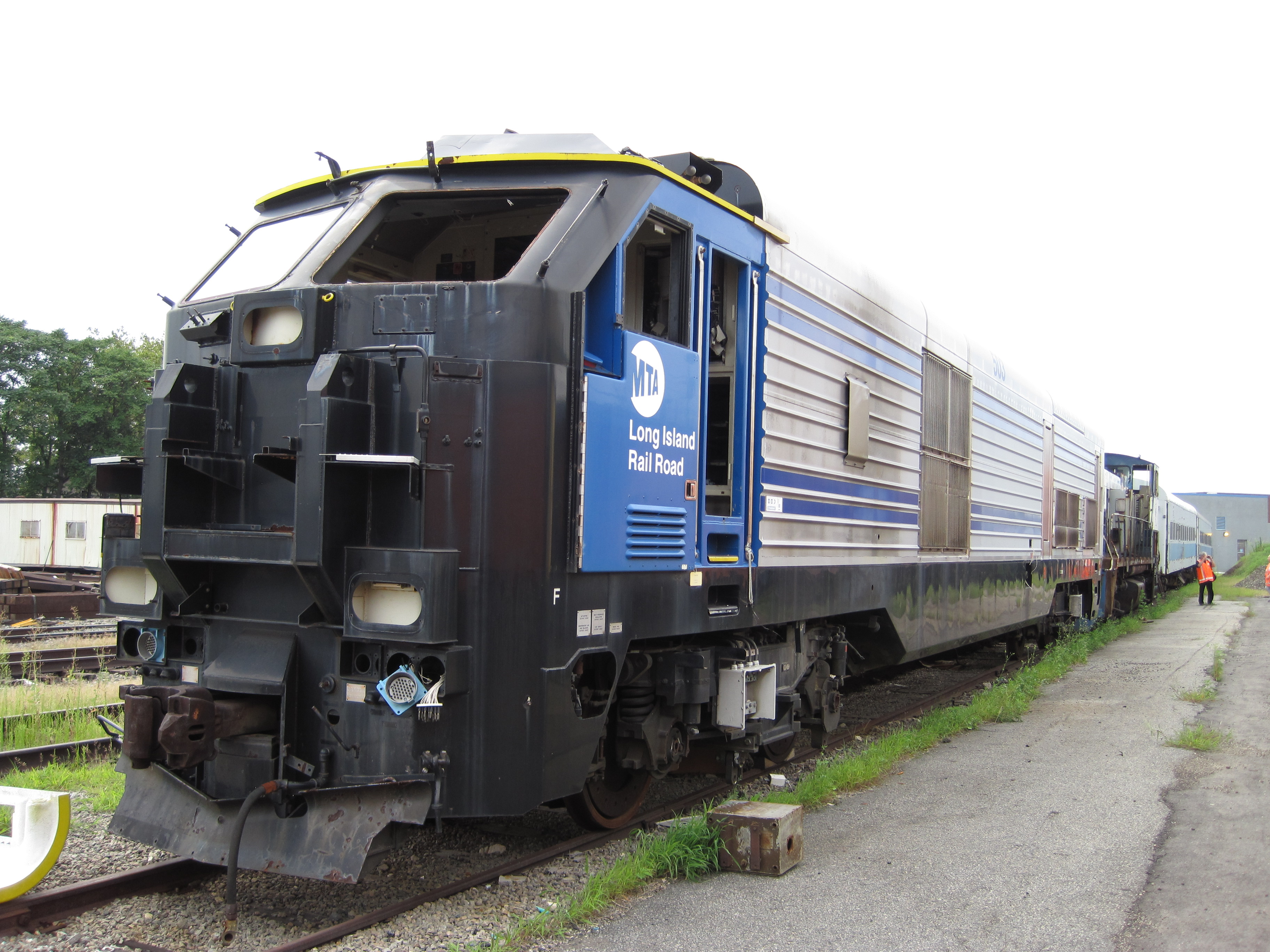
The remnants of engine No. 503

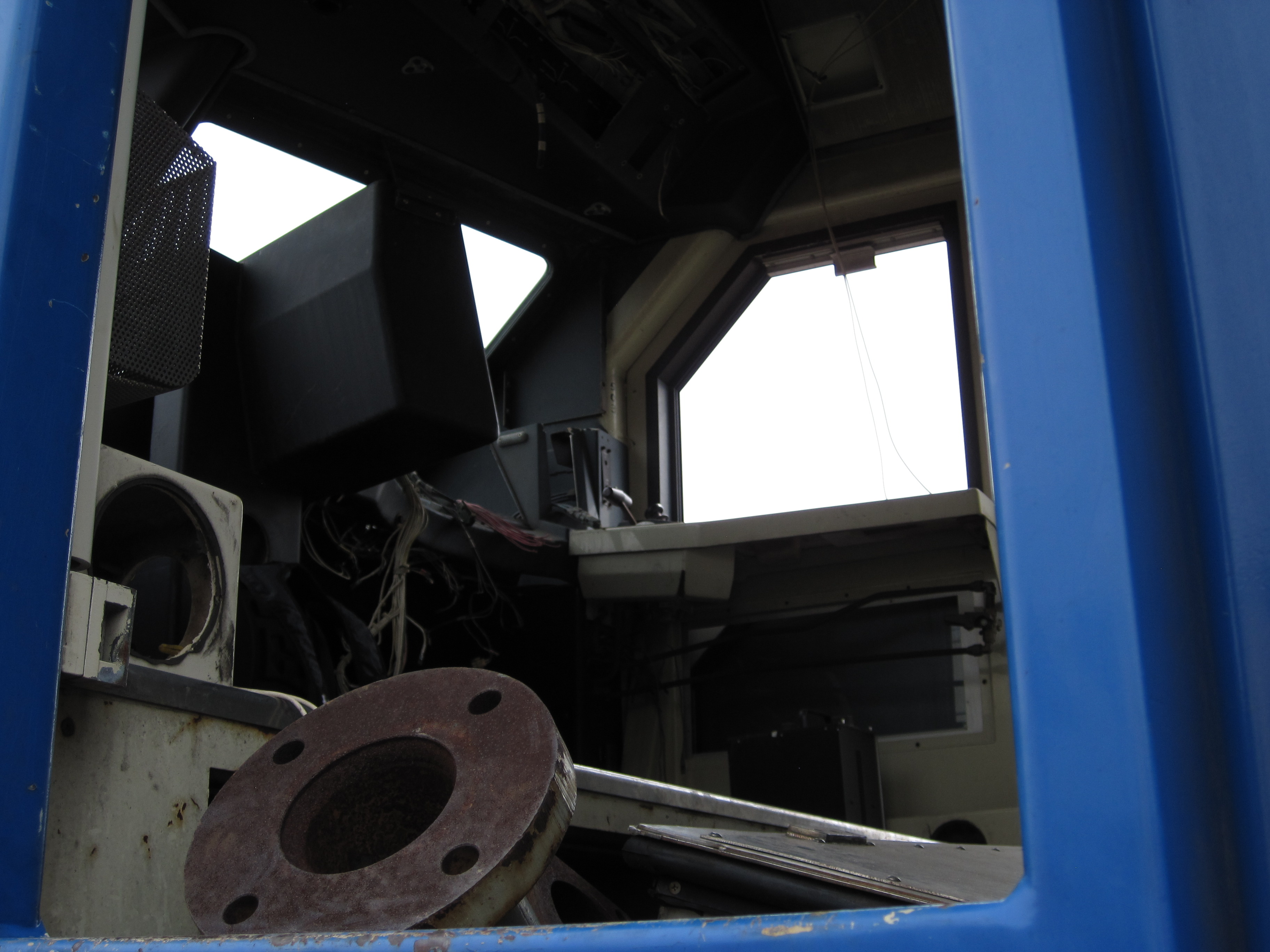
The cab of engine No. 503

== See also ==
- C3 (railcar)
