= Laurel Hill station =

Train station in New York City (1890–1905)

Laurel Hill
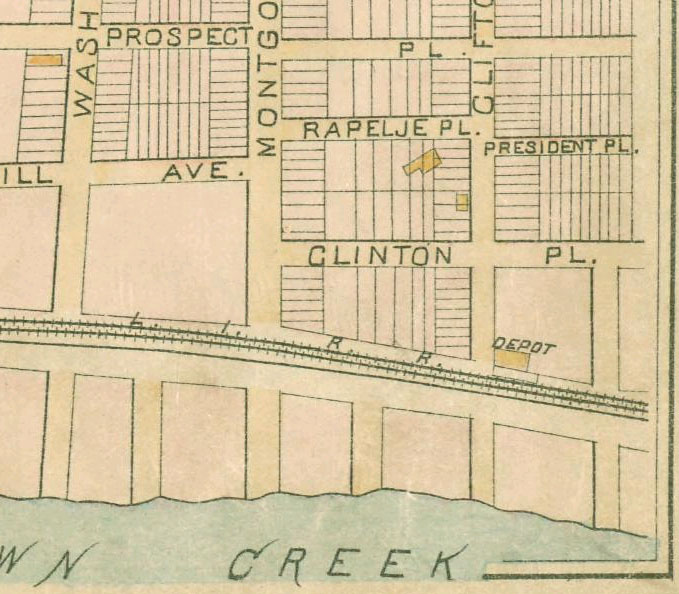
- An 1891 map of the area which included of the former Laurel Hill Station.

General information
- Location: Clifton Street; Long Island City, Queens, New York
- Coordinates: 40°43′36.38″N 73°55′24.91″W
- Owner: LIRR
- Line: Montauk Branch
- Platforms: 2 side platforms
- Tracks: 2

History
- Opened: 1890
- Closed: c.1900
- Electrified: August 29, 1905

Former services
Preceding station	Long Island Rail Road	Following station
Penny Bridge toward Long Island City	Montauk Division	Haberman toward Montauk
Location

Laurel Hill was a railroad station on the Lower Montauk Branch of the Long Island Rail Road in Long Island City, New York. It existed briefly around the 1880s and was located where Clifton Street (now 46th Street) used to intersect the railroad line.

Laurel Hill station was located a few blocks west of the point where the former junction between the New York and Flushing Railroad and South Side Railroad of Long Island existed. It was built by the LIRR in 1890. The station was relatively short-lived and closed in September 1892. Also in September 1892, the new Haberman station opened only a short distance to the east.
