= Dunton station =

Train station in New York City (1869–1939)

Dunton
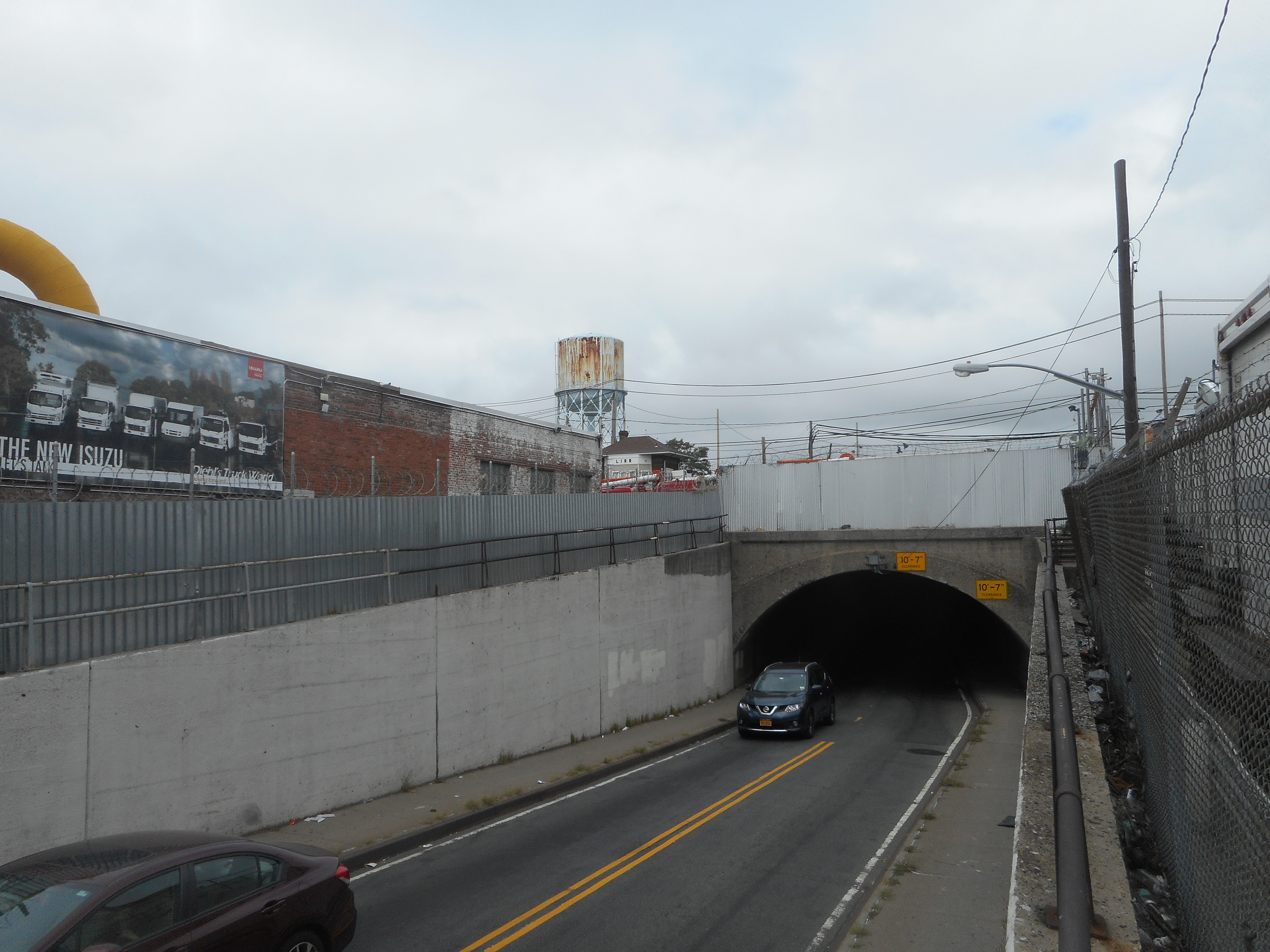
- The 130th Street Tunnel (with a Kew Gardens water tank in the background). This is the approximate site of the former Dunton LIRR station in September 2017.

General information
- Location: 130th Street and Atlantic Avenue, Dunton, Queens, New York
- Coordinates: 40°41′48.15″N 73°49′7.3″W
- Owner: Long Island Rail Road
- Lines: Montauk Branch and Atlantic Branch

History
- Opened: June 1869 (original) by 1890 (re-opening)
- Closed: June 1876 (first closing); November 1939 (second closing)
- Rebuilt: 1910–1914
- Electrified: August 29, 1905
- Former names: Van Wyck Avenue (1869–1871); Berlin (1871–1876)

Services
Preceding station	Long Island Rail Road	Following station
Westbridge toward Long Island City or Penn Station	Main Line	Jamaica toward Greenport
Richmond Hill toward Long Island City	Montauk Division	Jamaica toward Montauk
Morris Park toward Flatbush Avenue	Atlantic Division	Jamaica toward Valley Stream
Location

Dunton was a ground-level station on the Long Island Rail Road's Montauk Branch, Atlantic Branch, and later the Main Line in Dunton, Queens, New York City, United States. It was closed in 1939 when the Atlantic Branch was placed in a tunnel east of East New York.

== History ==
The South Side Railroad of Long Island, which crossed the LIRR's Atlantic Branch at 130th Street, opened Van Wyck Avenue (pronounced Van Wick) station on the south side of its line in June 1869, almost a year after the line opened. A depot was added in July 1870, and in May 1871 the name was changed to Berlin. The LIRR leased the South Side on May 3, 1876, and effective Sunday, June 25, 1876, the Berlin station was closed, with all South Side passenger trains from the west (Lower Montauk Branch) switching to the Atlantic Branch where they crossed. The depot was moved west to the Lefferts Boulevard crossing on the Atlantic Branch in 1878 and named Morris Grove.

Frederick W. Dunton, developer of Dunton, donated a station building to the LIRR. Local Atlantic Avenue rapid transit trains began to stop there, at the same place as the old Berlin station, by mid-1890. In April or May 1897, the depot was moved to the north side of the Atlantic and Montauk tracks, and a stop was established on the Main Line. Prior to the nearby "Jamaica Improvement" project of 1912–13, the LIRR began the elevation of the tracks near Dunton, which included reconstruction of the station itself that was completed by April 1914. With the sinking of the Atlantic Branch into a tunnel, the station closed on November 1, 1939, along with six other stations on the Atlantic Branch. The former staircase to the eastbound station platform is at the southeast corner of the 130th Street Tunnel surrounded by a fence, while the staircase to the westbound platform is within the tunnel itself.

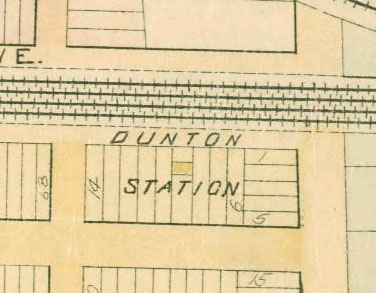
Dunton station on an 1891 map, halfway between 134th Street and Van Wyck Avenue
