= Penny Bridge =

Penny Bridge may refer to:

- Penny Bridge, Cumbria, a village in England
- Penny Bridge station, a railway station in New York, United States
