= Maspeth station (Flushing Railroad) =

Train station in New York City (1855–58)

Maspeth

General information
- Location: Covert Avenue and Joy Street; Maspeth, Queens, New York
- Coordinates: 40.728444°N 73.912198°W
- Owner: LIRR
- Line: New York & Flushing Railroad
- Platforms: 2 side platforms
- Tracks: 2

History
- Opened: January 15, 1855
- Closed: 1858

Former services
Preceding station	Flushing Railroad	Following station
Penny Bridge toward Hunter's Point	New York and Flushing Railroad	Winfield Junction Terminus
Location

Maspeth station was a stop along the original New York & Flushing Railroad that opened on January 15, 1855. Maspeth station was located at Covert Avenue, now 58th Street, at Joy Street, now 54th Drive. So far as is known, there was no depot building. This station was discontinued very early on, probably in 1858. The segment between what was to become the former Laurel Hill station and Winfield station, was abandoned for passenger service in 1875, including the location of the Maspeth station, and completely abandoned in 1880. Part of the right-of-way ran through what is today the Mount Zion Jewish Cemetery in Maspeth. The Flushing and Woodside was merged into the Flushing and North Side in 1871, and its line was abandoned in favor of the ex-New York and Flushing line.
