= Ridgewood station (LIRR Lower Montauk Branch) =

Train station in New York City (1883–1924)

Ridgewood

General information
- Location: Woodhaven Boulevard near 78th Avenue; Glendale, Queens, New York
- Coordinates: 40°42′27″N 73°51′33″W
- Owner: Long Island Rail Road
- Line: Montauk Branch
- Platforms: 1 side platform
- Tracks: 2

Other information
- Station code: None

History
- Opened: June 2, 1883
- Closed: 1924

Former services
Preceding station	Long Island Rail Road	Following station
Glendale toward Long Island City	Montauk Division	Richmond Hill toward Montauk
Location

Ridgewood was a train station along the Lower Montauk Branch of the Long Island Rail Road, located at Woodhaven Boulevard near 78th Avenue in Glendale, Queens, just east of Glendale Junction, the connecting track between the Montauk Branch and Rockaway Beach Branch. It opened on June 2, 1883, and closed in 1924.
