= Promised Land station =

Former train station in New York, US

Promised Land

General information
- Location: Promised Land, New York
- Coordinates: 40°59′12″N 72°05′16″W
- Owner: Long Island Rail Road (former)
- Platforms: 1 side platform
- Tracks: 1

History
- Opened: June 29, 1900
- Closed: December 31, 1928

Former services
Preceding station	Long Island Rail Road	Following station
Fanny Bartlett toward Long Island City	Montauk Division	Montauk Terminus
Location

Promised Land or Promise Land was a former railroad station stop on the Montauk Branch of the Long Island Rail Road. It opened as a flag stop only, for employees of neighboring fish processing plants. The station appears as a signal stop as '"Promise Land" in special instructions of employee timetable #15 of June 29, 1900, as well as employee timetable #27 of June 25, 1908 and employee timetable #49 of September 9, 1908. It also appears under station designation S106 in 1903, 1913, and 1924 CR4BOOKS according to Art Huneke. The station closed on December 31, 1928 according to Robert Emery. The stop was located near the junction with the siding serving the fish processing plants.
