= Clarenceville station (LIRR) =

Train station in New York City (1874–1939)

Clarenceville
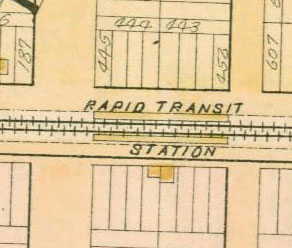
- 1891 map of Clarenceville station

General information
- Location: Atlantic Avenue and 111th Street, Richmond Hill, Queens, New York
- Coordinates: 40°41′31.2″N 73°50′07.2″W
- Owner: Long Island Rail Road
- Line: Atlantic Branch
- Platforms: 2 side platforms
- Tracks: 2

Other information
- Station code: None
- Fare zone: 1

History
- Opened: 1874
- Closed: 1939
- Electrified: 1905

Former services
Preceding station	Long Island Rail Road	Following station
Woodhaven Junction toward Flatbush Avenue	Atlantic Division	Morris Park toward Valley Stream
Location

The Clarenceville station was on the Atlantic Branch of the Long Island Rail Road, located on Atlantic Avenue west of 111th Street in the Richmond Hill section of Queens, New York City. Richmond Hill station to the north, at Jamaica Avenue and Lefferts Boulevard, was also originally named Clarenceville Station when it opened in 1868, but that name was changed in 1871.

Clarenceville was originally an 1874-built Atlantic Avenue Rapid Transit station that was reopened as an LIRR station in 1905 as part of the LIRR's electrification of the Atlantic Branch, and closed in 1939, when the branch was moved underground, along with Warwick Street, Autumn Avenue, Union Course, Woodhaven, Morris Park, and Dunton stations.
