= Cranberry Hole Road Bridge =

Bridge in Suffolk County, New York

- An LIRR passenger train passing beneath
- Coordinates: 40°58′48.0″N 72°06′42.2″W
- Carries: Cranberry Hole Road
- Crosses: Montauk Branch
- Locale: Amagansett, Town of East Hampton, Suffolk County, New York
- Owner: Metropolitan Transportation Authority

Characteristics
- Material: Steel with timber deck
- Total length: 131 ft (40 m)

History
- Opened: 1895
- Closed: 2023

Location
- Interactive map of Cranberry Hole Road Bridge

The Cranberry Hole Road Bridge is a closed road bridge that carries Cranberry Hole Road (Suffolk County Road 33) over the Long Island Rail Road (LIRR) Montauk Branch in Amagansett, New York, within the town of East Hampton, Suffolk County, New York. Built in 1895, the bridge consists of five steel girder spans with a timber roadway deck supported by concrete abutments and timber column bents.

== Closure ==
For decades, the bridge experienced recurring deck and pavement problems that local officials attributed to movement in the structure under traffic loads, with asphalt repairs repeatedly failing as the bridge flexed. Reporting also noted that posted weight restrictions were frequently ignored, with overweight vehicles contributing to accelerated deterioration.

In May 2023, the bridge was temporarily closed after a hole opened in the roadway surface, exposing underlying timber elements. After the town completed interim repairs, the crossing briefly reopened in June 2023; however, a subsequent inspection led the New York State Department of Transportation and the Long Island Rail Road to close the bridge again on July 3, 2023. The bridge has remained closed indefinitely since that date.

The 2023 closure also revived a dispute over responsibility for the bridge. Town officials stated that the Long Island Rail Road owned the structure, while the LIRR asserted that the bridge was the town’s responsibility.

By 2025, local officials and residents were calling for full replacement rather than continued repairs, citing traffic detours and concerns about emergency access while the bridge remained out of service. In August 2025, the Metropolitan Transportation Authority included the bridge in a design–build contract to replace multiple roadway bridges over the Montauk Branch. In September 2025, State Assemblyman Tommy John Schiavoni said the project was moving through the MTA procurement process, with a contract award projected by the end of 2025.
