= Maspeth station (LIRR) =

Train station in New York City (1895–1925)

Maspeth

General information
- Location: Rust Street and 58th Avenue; Maspeth, Queens, New York
- Coordinates: 40.722833°N 73.914056°W
- Owner: LIRR
- Line: Montauk Branch
- Platforms: 2 side platforms
- Tracks: 2

History
- Opened: February 4, 1895
- Closed: 1924 or 1925

Former services
Preceding station	Long Island Rail Road	Following station
Haberman toward Long Island City	Montauk Division	Fresh Pond toward Montauk
Location

Maspeth was a station along the Lower Montauk Branch of the Long Island Rail Road. It was opened in the vicinity of St. Saviour's Church as a rapid-transit stop on February 4, 1895, at what is now 58th Avenue and Rust Street in Maspeth, Queens. The station closed in October 1903. It was reopened at an unknown date and closed again in 1924 or 1925. The station building was removed in 1925 and the station stop itself was discontinued. Currently the area is the site of freight activity by the New York and Atlantic Railway.
