= Montauk Branch =

Long Island Rail Road branch

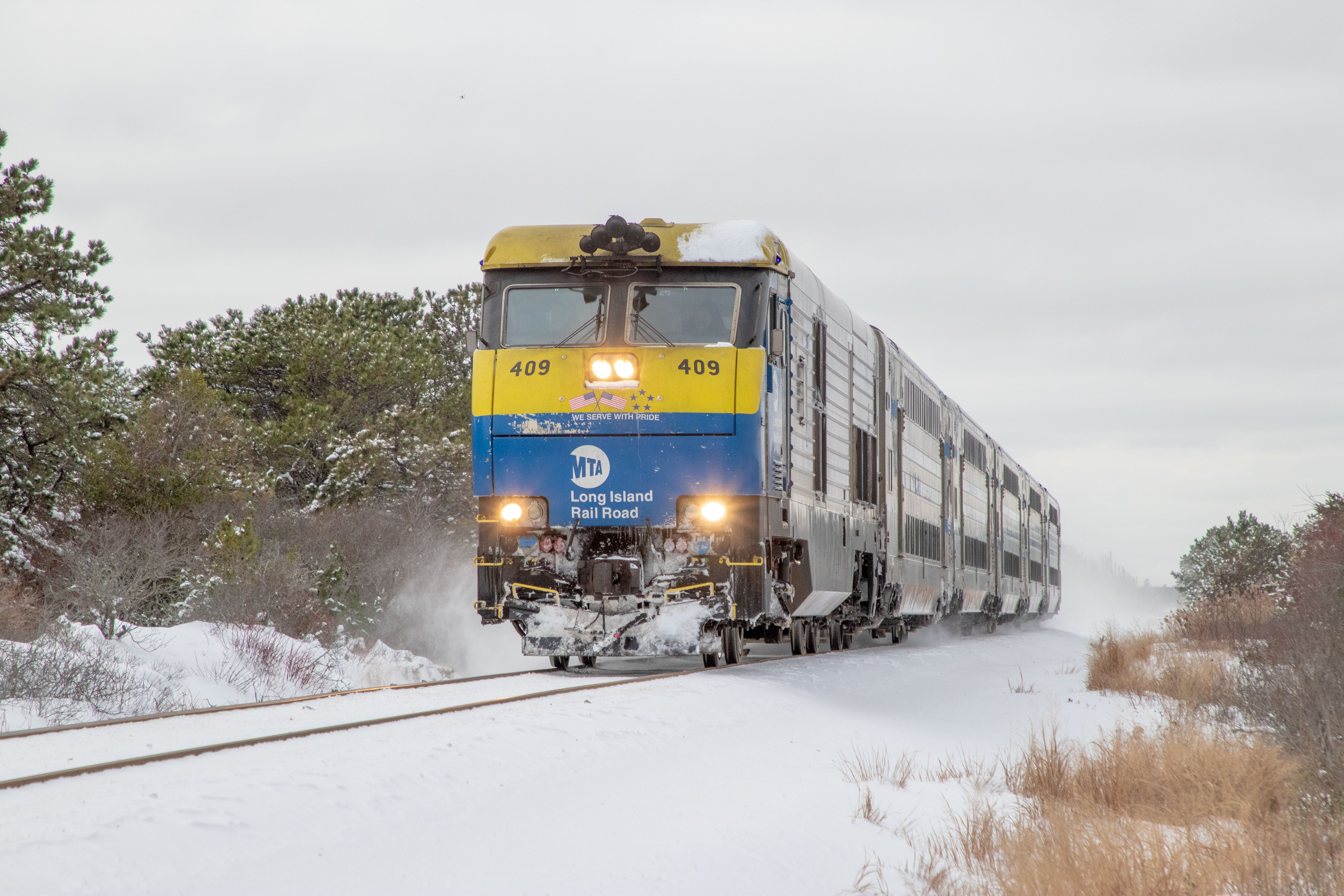
- A Long Island Rail Road train on the Montauk Branch passing through Napeague, New York.

Overview
- Status: Operational
- Owner: Long Island Rail Road
- Locale: Long Island, New York, U.S.
- Termini: Long Island City (physical line); Babylon (service pattern); Montauk
- Stations: 33 (physical line); 16 (service pattern)

Service
- Type: Commuter rail, freight rail
- System: Long Island Rail Road
- Services: West Hempstead Branch Babylon Branch Montauk Branch
- Operator(s): Metropolitan Transportation Authority (passenger); New York and Atlantic Railway (freight)
- Ridership: 1,966,237 (annual ridership, 2025)

Technical
- Line length: 115.8 mi (186.4 km)
- Num of tracks: 2 (from Long Island City to Sayville); 1 (east of Sayville)
- Track gauge: 4 ft 8 1/2 in (1,435 mm) standard gauge
- Electrification: Third rail, 750 V DC (Jamaica–Babylon)
Route map
- Distances shown from Long Island City via the Lower Montauk Branch

The Montauk Branch is a rail line owned and operated by the Long Island Rail Road in the U.S. state of New York. The line runs the length of Long Island, 115 miles (185 km) from Long Island City to Montauk.

In LIRR maps and schedules for public use, the term Montauk Branch is used only for the train service stopping at stations at Babylon and eastwards, some of which actually use the Main Line and Central Branch to and from Jamaica during peak hours. Service along the physical Montauk Branch between Jamaica and Babylon is covered by the separate Babylon Branch service. The line west of Jamaica is currently unused for passenger service.

== Route description ==
=== Lower Montauk ===
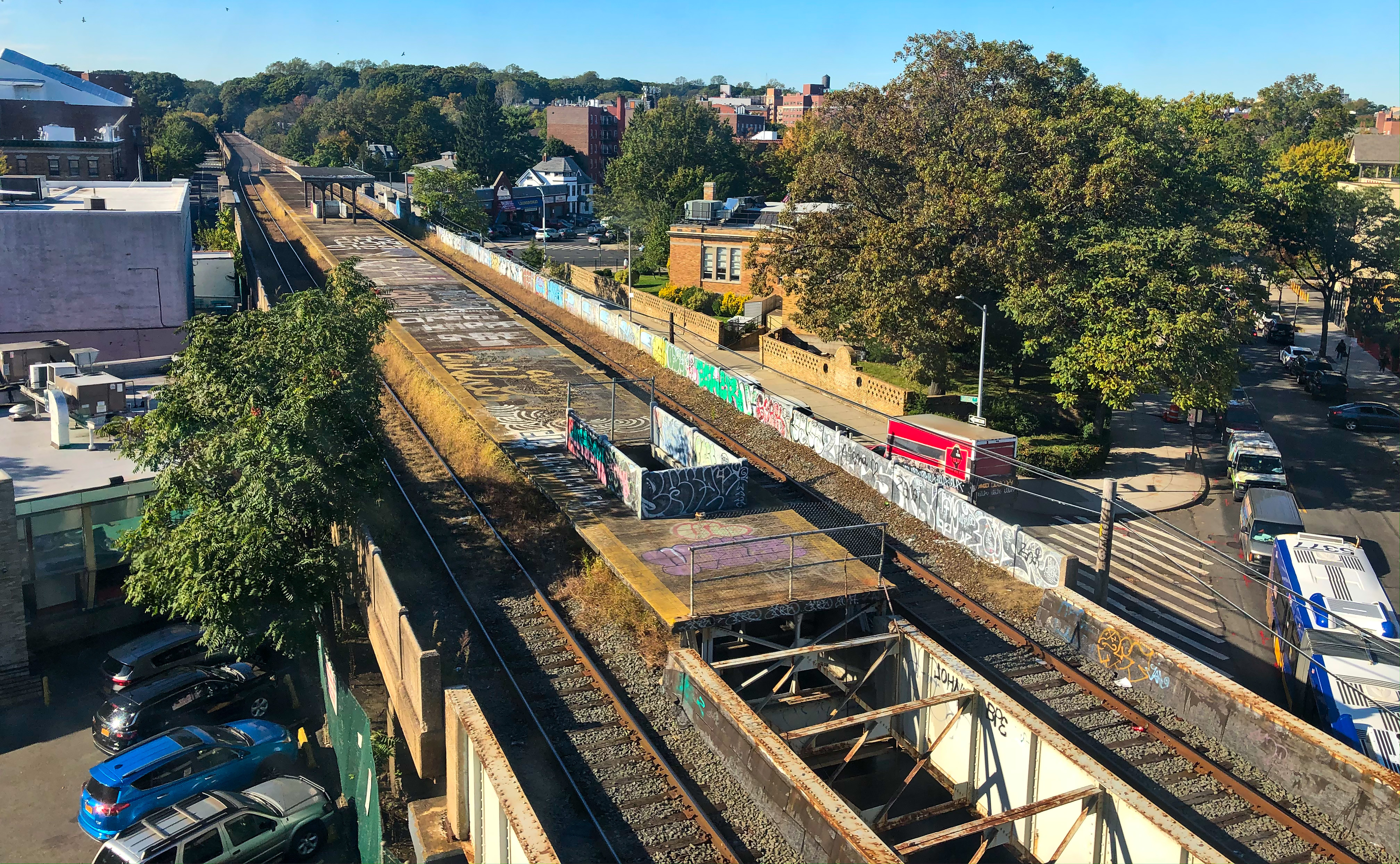
Lower Montauk Branch (defunct Richmond Hill station) in 2019

The westernmost portion of the Montauk Branch in Queens, known as the "Lower Montauk," runs between the Long Island City and Jamaica stations, mostly at street level with grade crossings. East of the Long Island City station, the abandoned Montauk Cutoff merges with the branch, after both cross Dutch Kills. The Lower Montauk Branch had nine stations, four of which were closed by 1940. The remaining five stations (Richmond Hill, Glendale, Fresh Pond, Haberman, and Penny Bridge) were closed on March 13, 1998, due to low ridership and incompatibility with then-new C3 bi-level coach cars that can only use high platforms (only Richmond Hill had an actual platform; the other four stations' platforms were just pavement strips beside the tracks). After these stations closed, the LIRR continued to use the Lower Montauk to operate non-stop trains between Jamaica and Long Island City rather than divert them to the Main Line; there were only two such trains at the time of the 1998 station closures, one westbound in the morning, and one eastbound in the evening. These two trains were re-routed north to Hunterspoint Avenue in 2012, effectively ceasing passenger train service on the Lower Montauk. Soon after, full control of the Lower Montauk was transferred to the New York and Atlantic Railway for freight operations.

The New York City Department of Transportation has periodically floated proposals to repurpose the Lower Montauk Branch for rapid transit operations. In 1984, the Department studied an option to connect the branch to the New York City Subway through a proposed connection to the IND 63rd Street Line in Long Island City. This proposal was unpopular in the communities surrounding the branch. In 2017, the Department studied a plan to operate light rail service on the Lower Montauk Branch.

After Penn Station opened in 1910, the Lower Montauk became primarily a freight route, and when the present Jamaica station opened in 1913, the two Lower Montauk tracks continued past the south side of the station, south of Hall tower and the south Union Hall Street platform and on to Holban Yard. Those two tracks now carry trains to/from the Hillside Facility that has replaced Holban Yard; they can also carry nonstop Main Line trains past Jamaica station.

=== Babylon Branch service ===
The portion between Jamaica and Babylon stations has been electrified since May 20, 1925, and electric trains to Babylon are often identified as a separate service, the Babylon Branch. It is grade-separated on embankments or elevated structures.

East from Jamaica the Montauk Branch runs between the Main Line tracks (with two usually westward Main Line tracks north of it and two eastward tracks south of it) until just west of Hillside Facility. At 40.70585°N 73.7845°W the Montauk Branch rises to cross above the other tracks and turns southeast.

At 40.667°N 73.747°W it swings parallel to the Atlantic Branch between its Laurelton and Rosedale stations. The Montauk Branch east of Jamaica is 0.7 mile longer than the Atlantic. The West Hempstead Branch diverges from the Montauk Branch just east of Valley Stream station, and an interlocking in the vicinity of that station allows movement to the Atlantic Branch, Far Rockaway Branch, and Long Beach Branch.

=== East of Babylon ===
From Babylon east to Montauk, diesel-electric or dual-mode electric/diesel-electric locomotives haul trains of passenger coaches. Some of the diesel trains on the Montauk Branch service begin or end their runs at Babylon station, connecting with electric trains there. Other Montauk diesel trains operate into New York City via the diesel-only Central Branch, joining the Main Line east of Bethpage station. Only a few actually run via the Montauk Branch west of Babylon, under normal conditions on the Main Line.

The Montauk Branch is double-tracked from just east of Long Island City (where there is a short segment of single track) all the way through Babylon, becoming single track at Y Interlocking east of the Sayville station. The terminal stations in diesel territory, east of Babylon, are Patchogue, Speonk, Southampton, and Montauk; South Fork Commuter Connection shuttles may short-turn at Hampton Bays and Amagansett.

The Montauk Line has heavy ridership and frequent service as far as Patchogue station and commuter service as far as Speonk station. In the summer, with travelers going out to The Hamptons, Fire Island and other beaches, additional service is operated to the far eastern terminal at Montauk, such as the Cannonball, a Friday afternoon train departing from Penn Station (originally Hunterspoint Avenue) and running non-stop to Westhampton station in Westhampton.

The Montauk Branch was home to the last tower in North America that regularly used "hooping" train operations: PD Tower, in Patchogue. "Hooping" is the transfer of instructions to the engineer and conductor by attaching the folded orders to the "hoop", a rod several feet long with a loop at the end that is passed from the ground to a moving train by catching the loop on one's arm. The last train to get hooped at PD was train 2730 on May 6, 2006.

== History ==
Currently, the Montauk Branch intersects with the Bushwick Branch, Bay Ridge Branch, West Hempstead Branch, and Central Branch, as well as the Main Line at Long Island City and Jamaica and the Atlantic Branch at Jamaica and Valley Stream; the Far Rockaway Branch and Long Beach Branch are connected via the Atlantic Branch at Valley Stream. In the past, junctions existed with the Rockaway Beach Branch (a quarter mile east of Woodhaven Boulevard), Southern Hempstead Branch (Valley Stream to Hempstead), Manorville Branch (Eastport to Manorville on the Main Line), and Sag Harbor Branch (Bridgehampton to Sag Harbor). In early times, the Scoot ran frequently between Greenport on the North Fork, "around the horn" on the Manorville Branch, and east to Sag Harbor. In their day, both of those villages were very busy, bustling ports.

=== Formation and early days: 1860s to 1925 ===
The South Side Railroad of Long Island built the line from Bushwick, Brooklyn to Patchogue in the 1860s, and completed the new line to Long Island City in 1870. With the reorganization of the South Side as the Southern Railroad of Long Island in 1874 and its lease by the LIRR in 1876, this line became the Southern Railroad Division, Southern Railroad of Long Island Division, or simply Southern Division. Effective Sunday, June 25, 1876, all Southern Division passenger trains were rerouted to use the LIRR main line from Berlin Junction (west of Jamaica) to Rockaway Junction, and the LIRR's Rockaway Branch to Springfield Junction, where it crossed the Southern. This change resulted in the closure of the Southern's Berlin, Beaver Street (Jamaica), Locust Avenue, and Springfield stations. The old line between Jamaica and Springfield, which became freight-only, was renamed the Old Southern Road. The Southern was reorganized as the Brooklyn and Montauk Railroad in 1879, and on March 14, 1880, the name was changed from the Southern Division to the Montauk Division. Thus the old South Side Railroad, except between Jamaica and Springfield Junction, was now the Montauk Division.

The LIRR opened the Sag Harbor Branch, including the present Montauk Branch from Eastport to Bridgehampton, on June 8, 1870. On July 27, 1881, after the South Side became part of the LIRR, its line – then the Montauk Division – was extended east to the Sag Harbor Branch at Eastport. The Sag Harbor Branch east of Eastport became part of the Montauk Division, and the old line from Manor (Manorville) to Eastport became the Manor Branch. An extension to Montauk, splitting off the old Sag Harbor Branch at Bridgehampton, opened to Amagansett on June 1, 1895 and to Montauk by September, and the line between Bridgehampton and Sag Harbor reverted to the old Sag Harbor Branch name.

=== Babylon electrification: 1925 to present ===
Electrification of the Montauk Division from Jamaica to Babylon was completed on May 20, 1925, and normal operation began the next day. The Central Extension between Bethpage and Babylon was reopened for freight trains that had run via the Montauk Division.

The Montauk station was initially near the center of a sleepy fishing village at the north end of Fort Pond (where Austin Corbin built a pier in his unsuccessful effort to have trans-Atlantic ships dock there.) The Great Hurricane of 1938 devastated the terminus area and tore up sections of the roadbed. The population center then moved two miles (3 km) to the south, away from the station.

In 1953, amid bankruptcy, the LIRR sought to abandon the Montauk branch east of Patchogue and operate bus service in its place. It cited low, predominantly non-commuter ridership and proximity to the Main Line, and potential savings of $450,000 per year, equal to $5,415,112 today. The Town of East Hampton protested this proposed closure, highlighting the potential for increased vehicular traffic due to lack of alternative means of travel, and the line ultimately remained open.

1998 saw the closure of three lightly used stations: Center Moriches, Quogue, and Southampton College. Bellport was also due to be closed at the same time, but was kept open and upgraded following community opposition. Southampton College was temporarily reinstated for the 2004 and 2018 U.S. Open tournaments at the nearby Shinnecock Hills Golf Club, along with a steel walkway over Montauk Highway. At the conclusion of the tournament, the walkway was dismantled and the temporary platform was removed.

On April 16, 2019, New York State Assemblyman Fred Thiele announced that funding to design improvements on the Montauk Branch would likely be included in the 2019–2020 state budget. The funding would be used by the LIRR to design three passing sidings to be installed on the line in single-track territory between Speonk and Montauk. The installation of passing sidings would allow for increased service on the South Fork Commuter Connection. MTA President and CEO Pat Foye said that improvements to the Montauk Branch were identified in the LIRR's request for the MTA's Twenty-Year Needs Assessment.

For summer 2026, with the return of the U.S. Open to Shinnecock Hills, the LIRR announced that it would build a temporary second platform at Hampton Bays, re-open Southampton College during the tournament, and extend the siding at Southampton Station by 80 feet (24 m).

Train passing beneath the closed Cranberry Hole Road Bridge in Amagansett

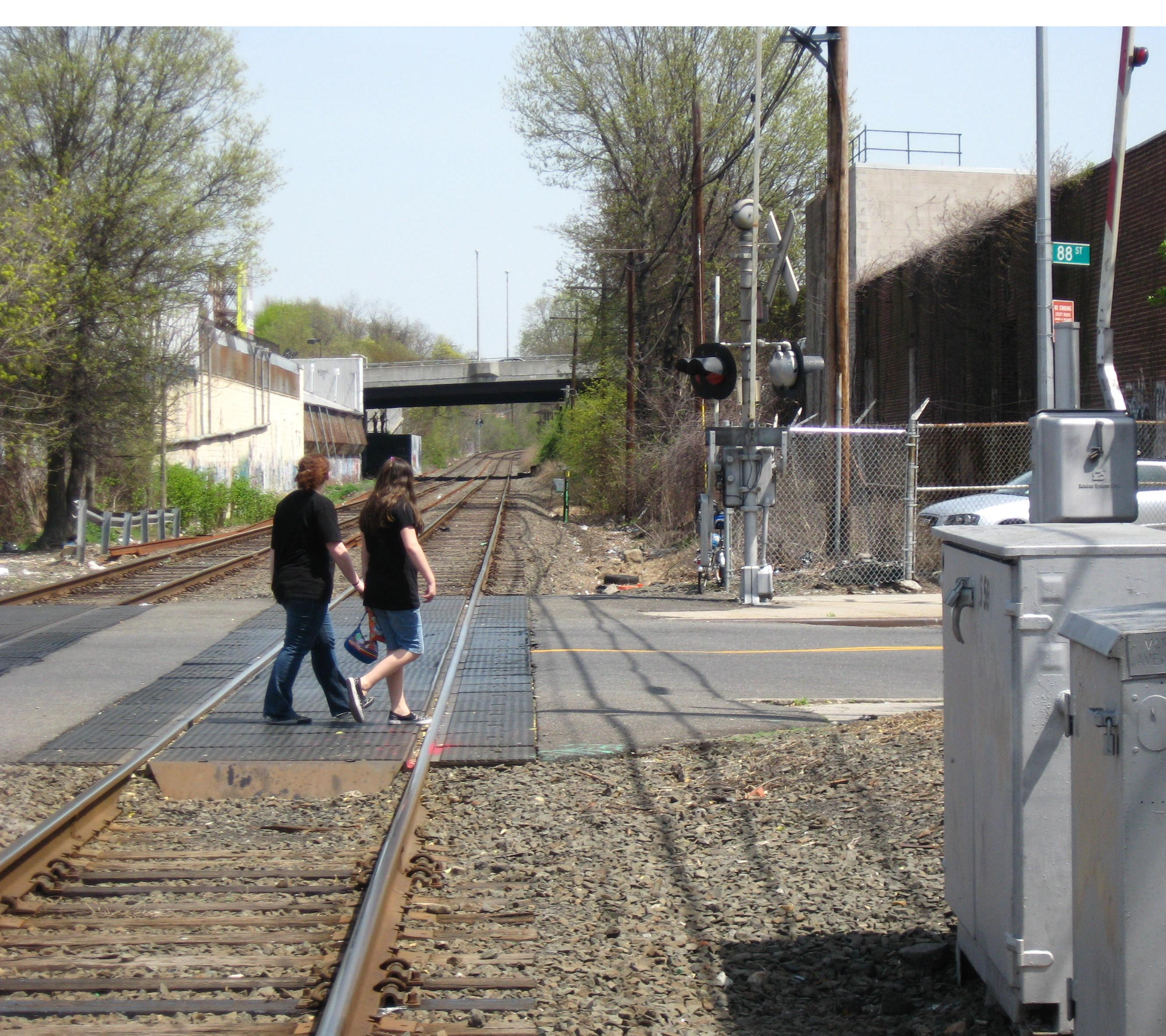
88th Street grade crossing over the Lower Montauk Branch; Woodhaven Boulevard overpass in background.

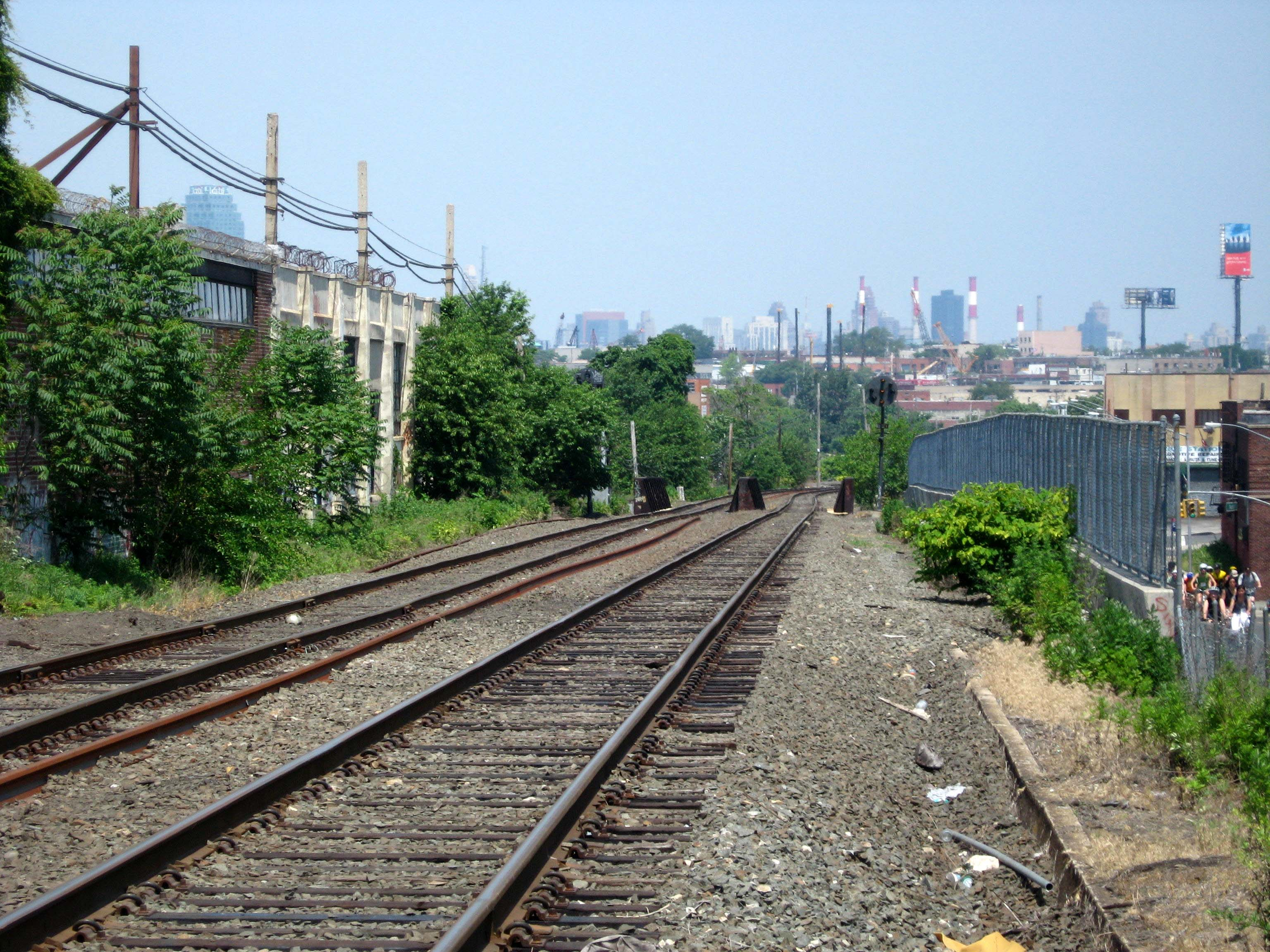
Lower Montauk passing over Grand Avenue

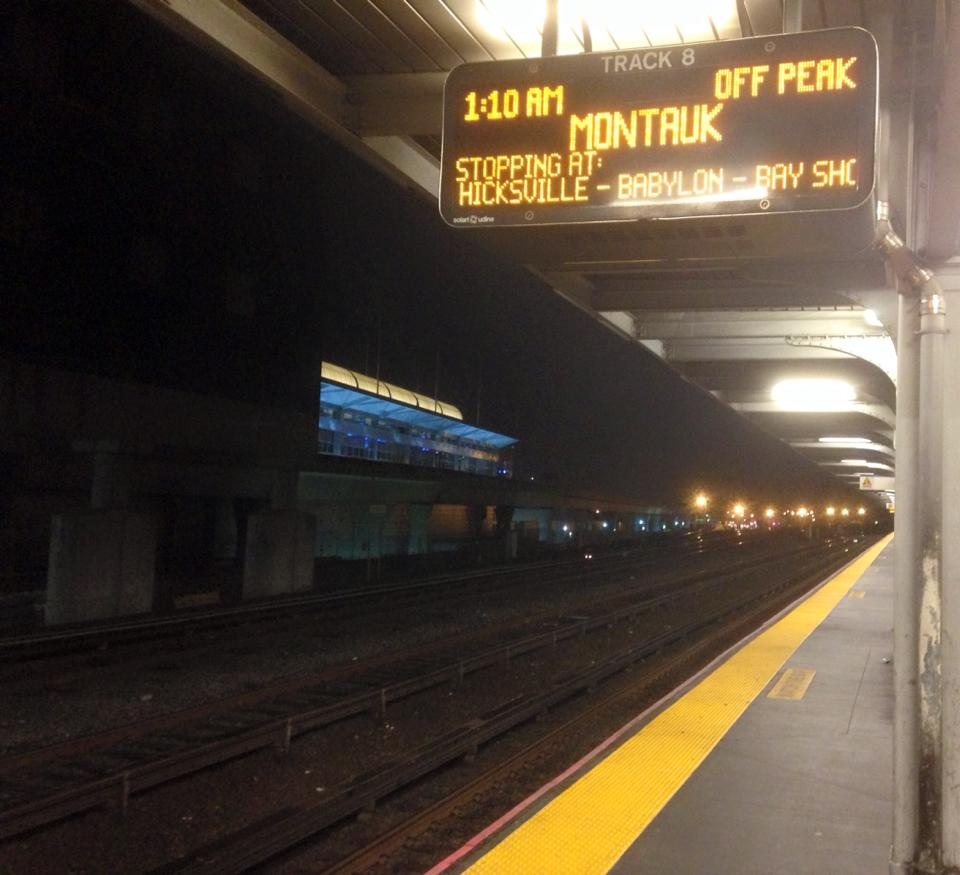
Track 8 at LIRR Jamaica Station, awaiting the arrival of a Montauk bound train.

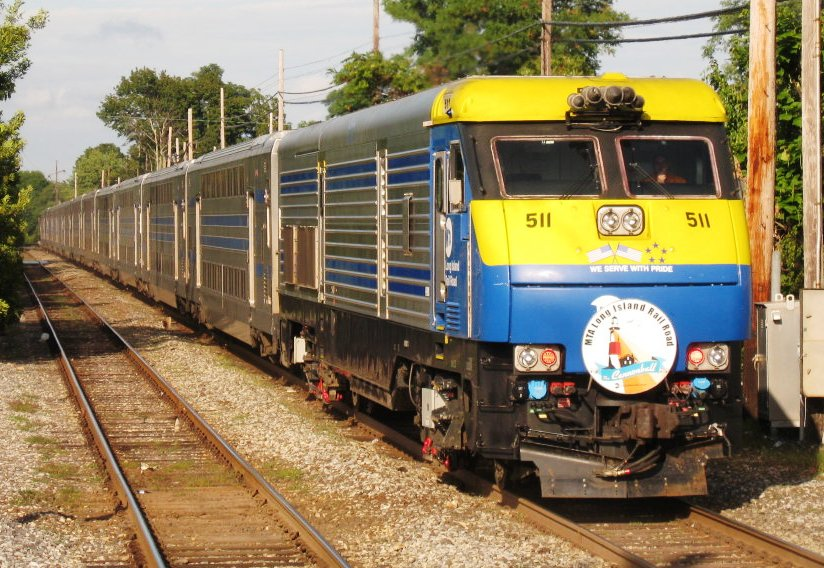
The Cannonball runs express through Bay Shore.

== Stations ==
West Hempstead Branch trains split off at VALLEY interlocking, just east of Valley Stream station. Babylon Branch trains terminate at Babylon, while Montauk Branch trains continue beyond. Many non-electric Montauk Branch trains that run express between Jamaica and Babylon run via the Main Line and Central Branch, with limited service to Mineola and Hicksville stations.

Zone	Location	Services			Station	Miles (km) (Note: Distance from Long Island City station via Lower Montauk Branch.)	Opened	Closed	Connections and notes
Zone	Location	WH	BB	MT	Station	Miles (km)	Opened	Closed	Connections and notes
1	Long Island City, Queens			●^{†}	Long Island City (rush hours only)	–	1854		Long Island Rail Road: ■ Oyster Bay Branch and ■ Port Jefferson Branch; New York City Subway: (at Vernon Boulevard – Jackson Avenue); MTA Bus: Q101, Q103; NYC Ferry East River Ferry † Served by five peak round trip trains, one of which is Montauk train
1	Long Island City, Queens				Penny Bridge		1854	1998	
1	Long Island City, Queens				Laurel Hill		c. 1890	c. 1900	
1	Maspeth, Queens				Haberman		1892	1998	
1	Maspeth, Queens				Maspeth		1895	c. 1924	
1	Maspeth, Queens				Fresh Pond		1869	1998	Originally named Bushwick Junction
1	Glendale, Queens				Glendale		1869	1998	
1	Glendale, Queens				Ridgewood		1883	1924	
1	Richmond Hill, Queens				Richmond Hill		1868	1998	Originally named Clarenceville
1	Richmond Hill, Queens				Shops		c. 1900	1913	Part of the Morris Park Facility
1	Richmond Hill, Queens				Dunton		1869; 1876	1876; 1939	Originally named Van Wyck Avenue, then Berlin
3	Jamaica, Queens	●	●	●	Jamaica	9.0 (14.5)	1836		Long Island Rail Road: ■ Atlantic Branch, ■ Far Rockaway Branch, ■ Hempstead Branch, ■ Long Beach Branch, ■ Oyster Bay Branch, ■ Port Jefferson Branch, ■ Ronkonkoma Branch; New York City Subway: (at Sutphin Boulevard–Archer Avenue–JFK Airport); New York City Bus: Q1, Q20, Q24, Q30, Q31, Q43, Q44 SBS, Q54, Q56, Q75; MTA Bus: Q6, Q8, Q9, Q25, Q40, Q41, Q60, Q65; Nassau Inter-County Express: n4 AirTrain JFK: ■ Jamaica Train
3	Jamaica, Queens				Union Hall Street		c. 1890	1976	Originally named New York Avenue
3	Jamaica, Queens				Canal Street		1890	1899	
3	Jamaica, Queens				Hillside		1890	1966	
3	St. Albans, Queens	●			St. Albans	11.8 (19.0)	1898		New York City Bus: Q3, Q4, Q51, QM64; Originally named Locust Avenue
3	Springfield Gardens, Queens				Springfield Gardens		1870s	1979	Originally named Springfield
4	Valley Stream				Valley Stream	16.1 (25.9)	1869		Platform on ■ Atlantic Branch tracks, though switches allow trains on the Montauk Branch to stop as needed. Nassau Inter-County Express: n1, Elmont Flexi
4	Lynbrook		●		Lynbrook	17.7 (28.5)	1867		Long Island Rail Road: ■ Long Beach Branch; Nassau Inter-County Express: n4, n25, n31, n31x, n32 Originally named Pearsall's Corners, then Pearsall's
7	Rockville Centre		●		Rockville Centre	19.3 (31.1)	1867		Nassau Inter-County Express: n15, n16, n16C, n31x, Mercy Medical Shuttle
7	Baldwin		●		Baldwin	21.2 (34.1)	1867		Nassau Inter-County Express: n35 Originally named Baldwinsville, then Baldwins
7	Freeport		●		Freeport	22.7 (36.5)	1867		Nassau Inter-County Express: n4, n19, n19x, n40, n41, n43, n88x
7	Merrick		●		Merrick	24.1 (38.8)	1867		
7	Bellmore		●		Bellmore	25.6 (41.2)	1869		
7	Wantagh		●		Wantagh	25.9 (41.7)	1867		Originally named Ridgewood
7	Seaford		●		Seaford	27.7 (44.6)	1899		} Nassau Inter-County Express: n54
7	Massapequa		●		Massapequa	28.7 (46.2)	1867		Nassau Inter-County Express: n54, n55, n80 Originally named South Oyster Bay
7	Massapequa Park		●		Massapequa Park	29.5 (47.5)	1933		Nassau Inter-County Express: n54, n55, n80
7	East Massapequa				Unqua		1880	1881	
9	Amityville		●		Amityville	30.6 (49.2)	1868		Nassau Inter-County Express: n54, n55, n71 Suffolk County Transit: 1, 2, 4, 10
9	Copiague		●		Copiague	32.4 (52.1)	1902		
9	Copiague				Belmont Junction		1875	1876	
9	Lindenhurst		●		Lindenhurst	33.7 (54.2)	1867		Suffolk County Transit: 10; Originally named Wellwood, then Breslau
9	Babylon		●	●	Babylon	36.6 (58.9)	1867		Suffolk County Transit: 2, 3, 5, 10, 15; Originally named Seaside Terminus of electrification
10	Bay Shore			●	Bay Shore	40.7 (65.5)	1868		Suffolk County Transit: 2, 7, 11, 12; Originally named Penataquit, then Bayshore
10	Islip								
10	Islip				Islip Centre		1868	1869	
10	Islip			●	Islip	43.1 (69.4)	1868		
10	East Islip								
10	East Islip				Club House		1870	1897	
10	East Islip			●	Great River	45.2 (72.7)	1897		Originally named Youngsport
10	Oakdale			●	Oakdale	47.4 (76.3)	1868		Suffolk County Transit: 2
10	Sayville			●	Sayville	49.8 (80.1)	1868		Sayville Ferry Service to Fire Island
10	Bayport				Bayport		1869	1980	
10	Blue Point				Blue Point		1870; 1900	1882; 1980	
10	Patchogue			●	Patchogue	53.2 (85.6)	1869		Suffolk County Transit: 2, 6, 51, 53, 55, 66, South Country On-Demand; Patchogue Village Bus; Davis Park Ferry to Fire Island
10	East Patchogue				East Patchogue		1890	1928	
10	Hagerman				Hagerman		1890	1929	
12	North Bellport			●	Bellport	57.8 (93.0)	1882		Suffolk County Transit: 66, South Country On-Demand; Originally named Accobomac, then Brewster Place
12	Brookhaven				Brookhaven		1884	1958	
12	Shirley			●	Mastic–Shirley	62.3 (100.3)	1960		Suffolk County Transit: 66
12	Mastic				Mastic		1882	1960	Originally named Forge
12	Center Moriches				Center Moriches		1881	1998	Originally named Moriches
12	East Moriches				East Moriches		1897	1958	
12	Eastport				Eastport		1870	1958	Originally named Moriches
12	Speonk			●	Speonk	70.8 (113.9)	1870		
14	Westhampton			●	Westhampton	74.3 (119.6)	1870		
14	Quogue				Quogue		1875	1998	
14	East Quogue				East Quogue		1871	c. 1883	Originally named Atlanticville
14	Hampton Bays			●	Hampton Bays	81.2 (130.7)	1871		Suffolk County Transit: 92; Originally named Good Ground
14	Hampton Bays				Canoe Place		1935	1953	
14	Hampton Bays				Suffolk Downs		1907	1921	
14	Shinnecock Hills				Shinnecock Hills		1887	1932	
14	Shinnecock Hills				Southampton College		1907 1976	1939 1998	Originally named Golf Grounds, then Southampton Campus. Temporarily reopened and named "Shinnecock Hills" for the 2004, 2018, and 2026 U.S. Opens at nearby Shinnecock Hills Golf Club.
14	Southampton			●	Southampton	89.3 (143.7)	1871		Suffolk County Transit: 92, on-demand
14	Water Mill				Water Mill		1875	c. 1968	Originally named Watermill
14	Bridgehampton			●	Bridgehampton	94.0 (151.3)	1870		
14	Wainscott				Wainscott		1898	1938	
14	East Hampton			●	East Hampton	100.9 (162.4)	June 1, 1895		Suffolk County Transit: 92, on-demand Originally named Easthampton
14	Amagansett			●	Amagansett	104.3 (167.9)	June 1, 1895		Suffolk County Transit: on-demand
14	Napeague				Napeague Beach		1895	1927	
14	Napeague				Fanny Bartlett		1924	1928	
14	Napeague				Promised Land		c. 1900	1928	
14	Montauk			●	Montauk	115.8 (186.4)	1895		Suffolk County Transit: on-demand
