= Richmond Hill station (LIRR) =

Train station in New York City (1869–1998)

Richmond Hill
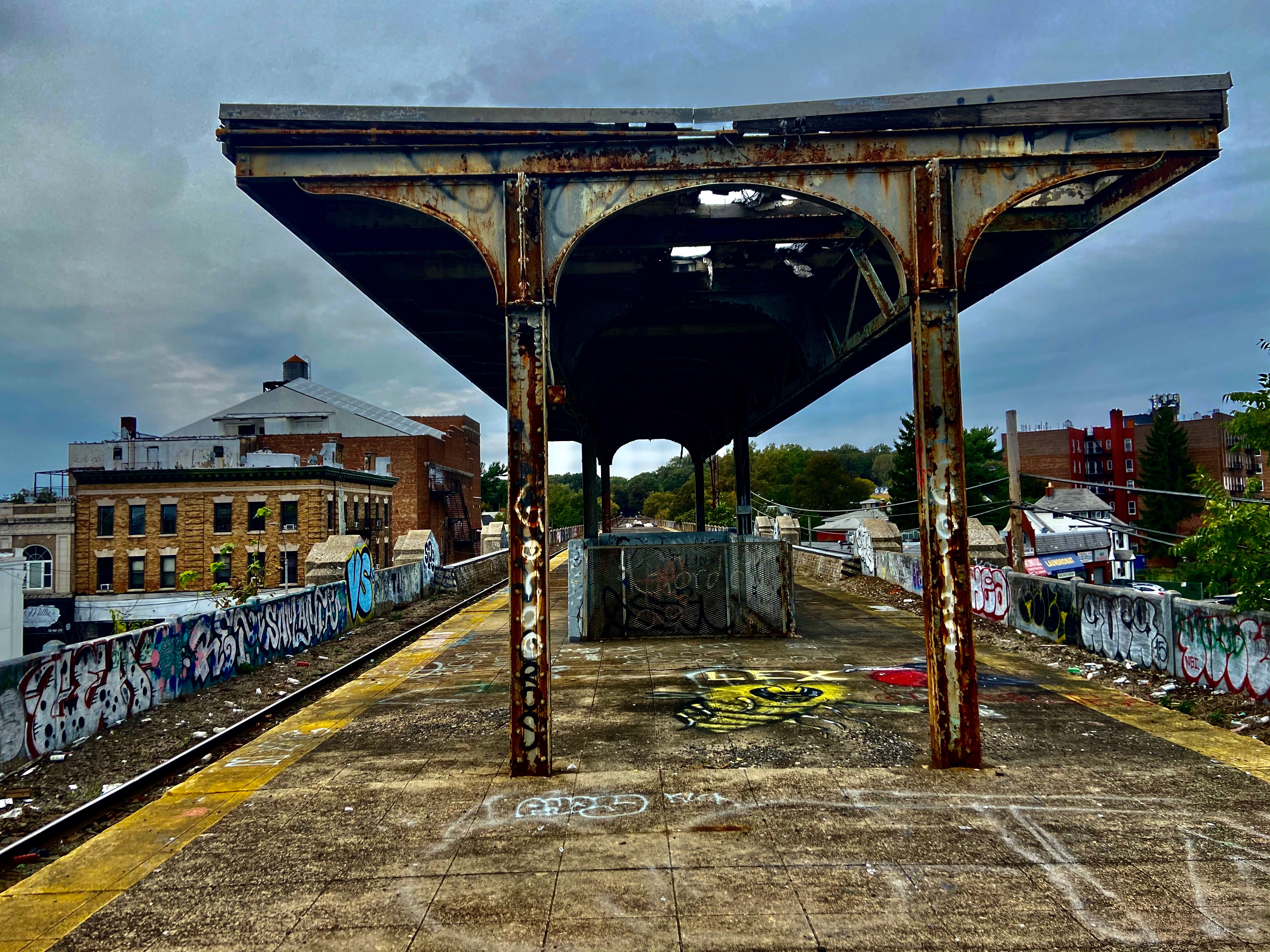
- The abandoned station canopy viewed in October 2020.

General information
- Location: Hillside Avenue and Babbage Street; Richmond Hill, Queens, New York
- Coordinates: 40°42′02″N 73°49′56″W
- Owner: Long Island Rail Road
- Line: Montauk Branch
- Platforms: 1 island platform
- Tracks: 2

History
- Opened: 1869
- Closed: March 16, 1998
- Rebuilt: 1923
- Electrified: August 29, 1905
- Former names: Clarenceville (1869–1871)

Former services
Preceding station	Long Island Rail Road	Following station
Ridgewood toward Long Island City	Montauk Branch	Dunton toward Montauk
Location

The Richmond Hill station is a closed station on the Montauk Branch of the Long Island Rail Road in the Richmond Hill neighborhood of Queens in New York City. The station is located at Myrtle Avenue and cuts diagonally from the intersection of Jamaica Avenue and Lefferts Boulevard through to Hillside Avenue. The station has two tracks and an island platform. Richmond Hill was the only station on the Lower Montauk Branch that was elevated with a high-level platform for passengers to wait for trains; the others were at ground level, with low-level platforms.

The Richmond Hill station was originally built by the South Side Railroad of Long Island in 1869 as the Clarenceville station. After New York City and the Long Island Rail Road began negotiating the elimination of numerous at-grade crossings within Queens in the 1910s, the current station was opened on a viaduct in 1923. The station was closed on March 16, 1998, along with nine others due to low ridership and the potential cost of upgrading the stations to modern standards; at the time of its closure, the station averaged one passenger per day.

== History ==
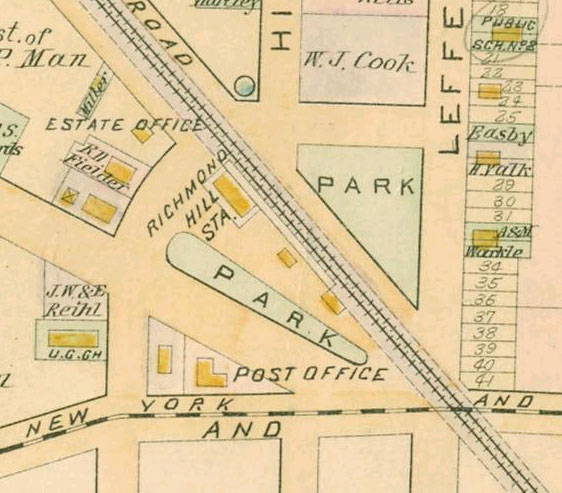
Richmond Hill station on an 1891 map

Richmond Hill station was originally built by the South Side Railroad of Long Island in 1869 as the Clarenceville station, distinct from the nearby Clarenceville station on the Atlantic Branch. Clarenceville was a farming community centered around Jamaica and Greenwood Avenues (the latter now 111th Street, where the Atlantic Branch station was located), which is now part of Richmond Hill. The Richmond Hill neighborhood was founded in 1868, with the purchase of the Lefferts and Welling farms by Albon Platt Man. The station name was changed to Richmond Hill in November 1871. It had two tracks with a station house on one side and an enclosed wooden shelter on the other.

In 1911, New York City and the Long Island Rail Road began negotiating the elimination of numerous at-grade crossings within Queens. In 1917, the LIRR finalized the grade crossing elimination project plans for the Montauk Branch in the Richmond Hill area, which would construct a new elevated station between Park Street (today's Hillside Avenue) and Lefferts Avenue (now Lefferts Boulevard). During the project, the wooden station was temporarily relocated. The current station opened in 1923. The project eliminated numerous at-grade crossings in the vicinity of the station, including those at St. Anne Avenue (now 84th Avenue), Ashland Avenue (now 85th Avenue), Park Street, the intersection of Jamaica and Lefferts Avenue, and Ridgewood Avenue (now 89th Avenue). It also extended the roads adjacent to the right-of-way then known as Railroad Avenue (now Babbage Street and Bessemer Street) east to Lefferts Avenue.

The station was closed on March 16, 1998, along with nine others, including the other four on the Lower Montauk branch, due to low ridership and the potential cost of upgrading the stations to modern standards. This station and Penny Bridge, also on the Lower Montauk, averaged one daily rider each at the time of their closure. The station and platform remain, though access via the staircase at Jamaica Avenue is gated off. Shortly after the station's closure, it was frequented by the homeless and animals, and was used as an illegal waste dumping site. In July 2003, new security fencing was installed around the trestle, though maintenance problems and trespassing issues have continued.

== Station layout ==
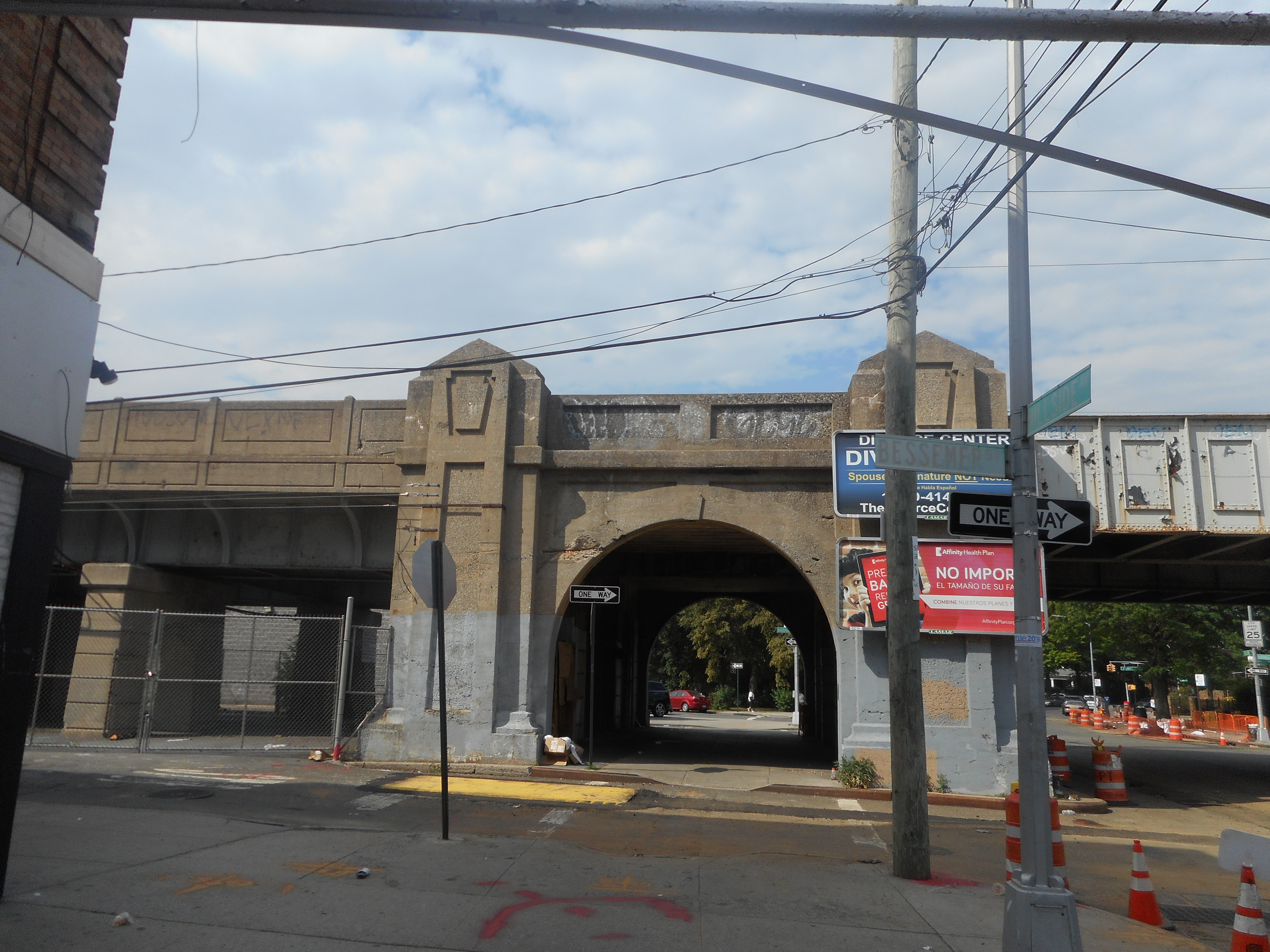
The station is located on a massive concrete viaduct

3F	BMT Jamaica Line
2F; Platform level	Westbound	No passenger service
2F; Platform level	Island platform, not in use
2F; Platform level	Eastbound	No passenger service
G	Street level	-

The station has two tracks and an island platform. Richmond Hill was the only station on the Lower Montauk Branch that was elevated with a high-level platform for passengers to wait for trains (the other four stations only had strips of pavement beside the tracks, requiring passengers to wait on track level and climb aboard trains). The station sits on a concrete trestle, supported by pairs of concrete arches. The station's island platform has a small shelter in the center, and two stairways down to the street. One staircase goes down from the shelter to Hillside Avenue. The other is at the south (railroad east) end that goes down to the three-way intersection of Myrtle Avenue, Lefferts Boulevard and Jamaica Avenue. The southern staircase is blocked by a security gate. The platform could accommodate trains of six 85-foot (26 m) cars.

Most of the space underneath the trestle between Lefferts Boulevard and Hillside Avenue is gated off by green fencing, installed in 2003. The area has been used as parking space in the past.

The Jamaica elevated (serving the New York City Subway's J and Z trains) runs above the Montauk Branch tracks along Jamaica Avenue. This section of the elevated was opened in 1917 by the Brooklyn–Manhattan Transit Corporation (BMT), built after the LIRR station. The closest station is two blocks east at 121st Street.
