= Glendale station (LIRR) =

Train station in New York City (1869–1998)

Glendale
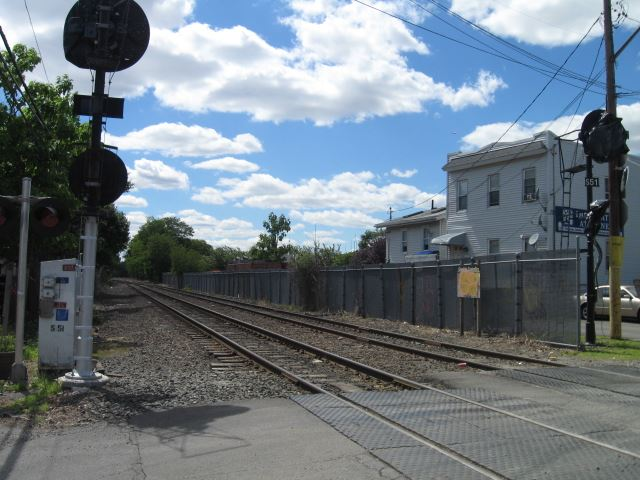
- The site of the former Glendale station in June 2014

General information
- Location: 73rd Street and Edsall Avenue; Glendale, Queens, New York
- Coordinates: 40°42′23.8″N 73°52′41.6″W
- Owner: Long Island Rail Road
- Line: Montauk Branch
- Platforms: 2 side platforms
- Tracks: 2

History
- Opened: June 1869
- Closed: March 16, 1998
- Rebuilt: 1928
- Electrified: August 29, 1905

Services
Preceding station	Long Island Rail Road	Following station
Fresh Pond toward Long Island City	Montauk Branch	Ridgewood toward Montauk

Former branch connections
Preceding station	Long Island Rail Road	Following station
Terminus	Rockaway Beach Division	Brooklyn Hills until 1911 toward Gibson or Rockaway Park
Location

Glendale was a Long Island Rail Road station along the Lower Montauk Branch, located in Glendale, Queens at Edsall Avenue and 73rd Street, near Central Avenue, at the All Faiths Monuments factory for the All Faiths Cemetery. This station had a sign indicating its location, and two tracks.

In recent years, proposals to bring back passenger service along the Lower Montauk Branch have been suggested.

== History ==
The station opened around June 1869 (although some sources claim it was built in 1868) and contained a small station house along the eastbound tracks. Nearby freight service included such companies as American Grass Twine Works, and Prairie Grass Furniture Company. Trains from the Rockaway Beach Branch also served the station prior to that line's connection with the LIRR Main Line. In January 1927, due to decreasing ridership, the LIRR razed the station, and on September 27, 1927, the name was moved to a new station at Metropolitan Avenue on the Rockaway Beach Branch. The name had lasted only for slightly more than a month until it was changed to Parkside Station on October 23, 1927, and Glendale was returned to the Montauk Branch as a wooden sheltered shed along the westbound tracks by 1928. The wooden shed was replaced by corrugated iron during World War II.

This station closed on March 16, 1998 along with the other remaining stations on the Lower Montauk branch, due to low ridership and inability to accommodate the C3 bi-level coaches, which can stop only at stations with high level platforms. This station had only two riders daily at the time of its closure.
