= South Side Railroad of Long Island =

- Map of the South Side Railroad of Long Island, with the Bushwick Branch near the west end and the Far Rockaway Branch on the southwest.

Overview
- Headquarters: Valley Stream, New York
- Locale: Kings County, Queens County, and Suffolk County, N.Y., U.S.
- Dates of operation: 1867–1876
- Successor: Southern Railroad of Long Island (1874-1876); Long Island Rail Road (1876-present)

The South Side Railroad of Long Island was a railroad company in the U.S. state of New York. Chartered in 1860 and first opened in 1867 as a competitor to the Long Island Rail Road, it was reorganized in 1874 as the Southern Railroad of Long Island and leased in 1876 to the LIRR. After a reorganization as the Brooklyn and Montauk Railroad in 1879 (immediately after which it was again leased to the LIRR) it was merged in 1889.

The main line of the South Side Railroad is now the Montauk Branch of the LIRR from Long Island City to Jamaica, the Atlantic Branch from Jamaica to Valley Stream, and the Montauk Branch again from Valley Stream to Patchogue. The Brooklyn and Montauk extended the line to Eastport while leased to the LIRR. The South Side also owned or leased lines that are now the Bushwick Branch and Far Rockaway Branch, as well as the IND Rockaway Line of the New York City Subway from Far Rockaway to Hammels (abandoned beyond Hammels to Rockaway Park) and an abandoned branch from Valley Stream to Hempstead.

== History ==
=== Incorporation and construction ===
The South Side Railroad was incorporated March 23, 1860, and organized April 20, 1860, to build from Brooklyn to Islip, with Willet Charlick, brother of the LIRR's Oliver Charlick, and Charles Fox of Baldwin in control. An April 12, 1867, supplement to its charter authorized an extension to East Hampton.

Construction began in June 1866, and it opened for regular service from Jamaica east to Babylon on October 28, 1867. Extensions opened to Islip on September 5, 1868, Sayville on December 11, 1868, and Patchogue on April 10, 1869.

=== Obtaining access to New York ===
The SSRRLI was forced to build its own line west of Jamaica due to the LIRR's purchase of the New York and Flushing Railroad on July 13, 1867. The South Side had been looking at using the New York and Flushing Railroad for access to Long Island City. To gain access to ferry service to New York City, the South Side decided to build to Williamsburg.

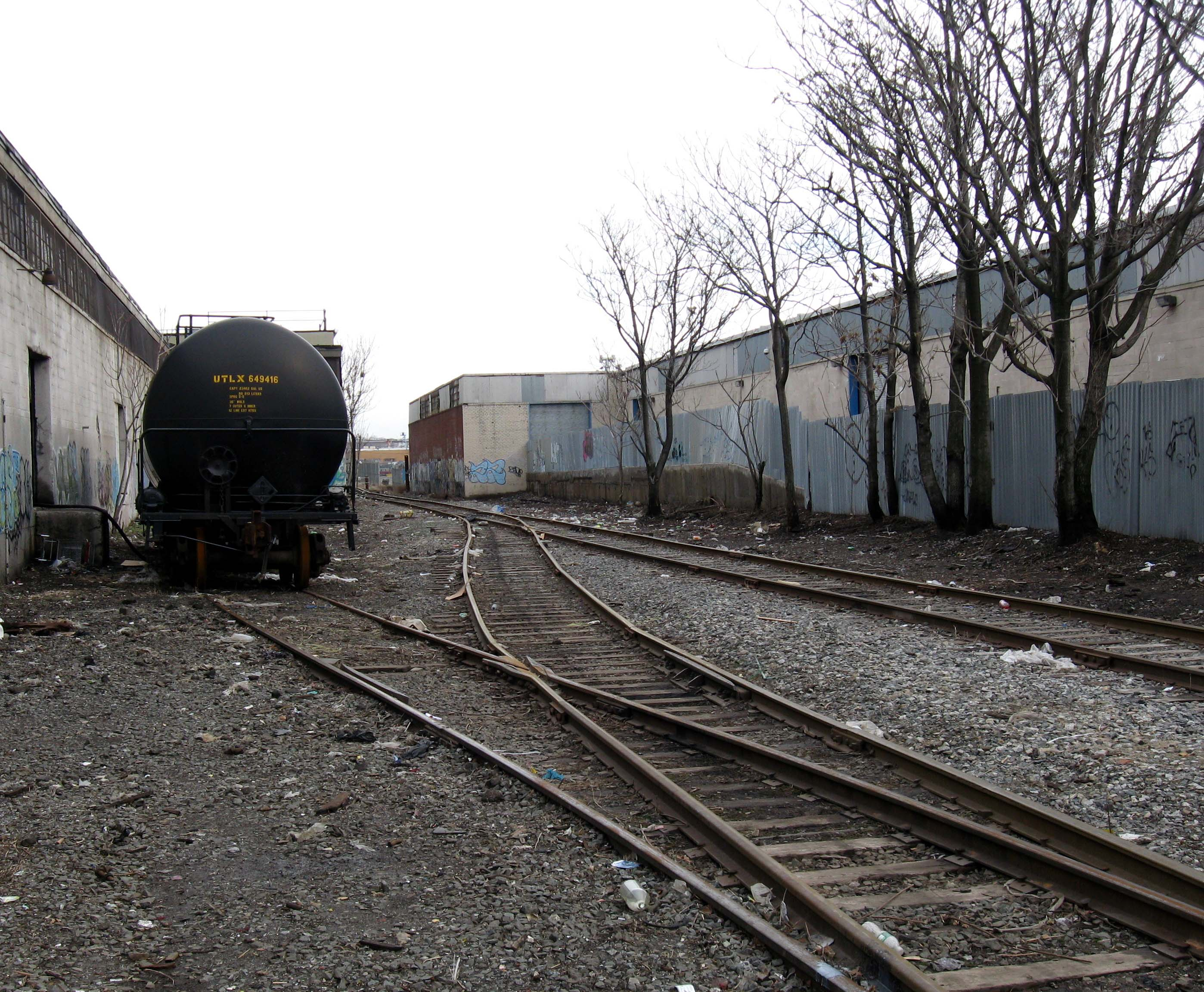
Bushwick Branch

The line from Jamaica west to Bushwick opened on July 18, 1868, with a streetcar connection to the 8th Street Ferry in Williamsburg, and it opened its own track in Boerum Street, Broadway, and 8th Street to Williamsburg (operated by horses, soon replaced by steam dummies, west of Bushwick) on November 4, 1868. A branch was also built from Maspeth (west of Flushing Avenue) northwest to Furman's Island at the junction of Newtown Creek and Maspeth Creek for freight.

However, the Flushing and North Side Railroad soon drove most traffic away from the New York and Flushing, leading to the portion east of Winfield being sold to the Flushing and North Side in 1869, and the rest lying unused.

The Hunters Point and South Side Railroad was incorporated on January 5, 1870 to connect Fresh Pond on the South Side with the East River, and opened in 1872 to a point on the New York and Flushing. The South Side thus gained a new freight terminal at Long Island City by rebuilding part of the old New York and Flushing, but passenger service continued to operate to Williamsburg.

Since the LIRR built the Sag Harbor Branch in 1869 and 1870 to cut off the competition, an extension beyond Patchogue was not built. Prior to the acquisition by the LIRR, there was a proposal by the SSRRLI to extend the main line southeast towards Bellport, and then northeast to Brookhaven and Southaven. Rather than the Brookhaven station that existed on the LIRR between 1884 and 1958, the planned station in Brookhaven was to be named "Fireplace" after Fireplace Neck.

=== Far Rockaway Branch ===
The South Side Railroad incorporated a subsidiary, the Far Rockaway Branch Railroad, on June 22, 1868 to construct a branch from the main line at Valley Stream to the Rockaways. The new line opened on July 29, 1869 to Mott Avenue at Far Rockaway. While constructing it in summer 1869, the company installed about 700 feet (200 m) of tracks across William B. McManus's farmland near Lawrence. However, the transaction had not been completed, and McManus and some friends tore up the track the next night; after a legal battle, the company paid McManus. The Far Rockaway Branch was extended September 2, 1869 to the Boardwalk at Beach 30th Street.

The Rockaway Railway was incorporated September 5, 1871 to continue from Far Rockaway west to Rockaway Point, and opened July 4, 1872 to Beach 103rd Street at Seaside,. Both companies were merged into the South Side on September 14, 1872, along with the Hunters Point and South Side and New York and Flushing.

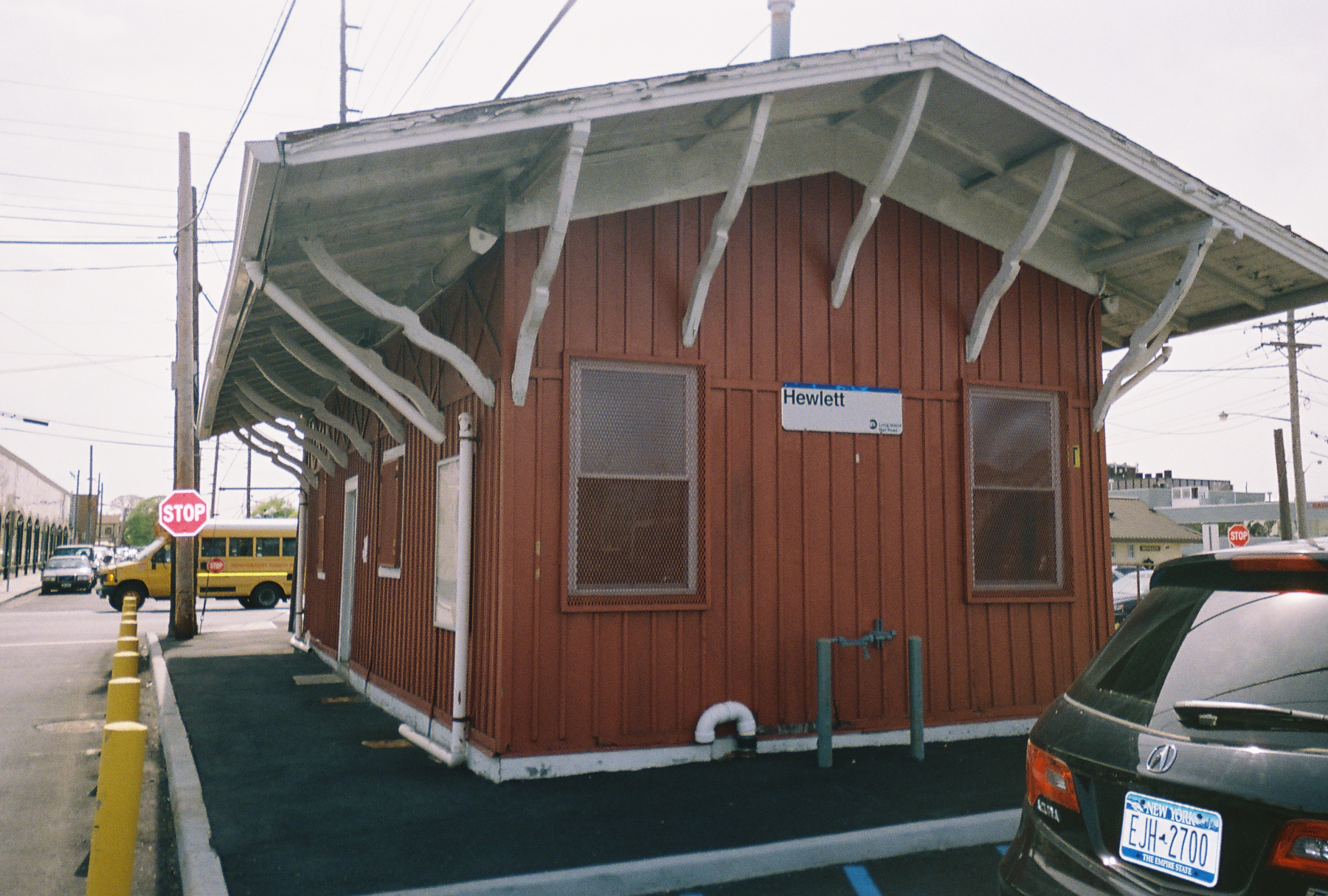
Hewlett station is the only surviving former SSRRLI depot.

=== South Hempstead Branch ===
The Hempstead and Rockaway Railroad was incorporated in April 1868 to build from Valley Stream on the South Side to Hempstead. The New York and Hempstead Plains Railroad was incorporated March 1, 1870, to build from Bay Ridge east to Hempstead, and on August 10, 1871 the two companies merged to form the New York and Hempstead Railroad. The line opened on September 28, 1872, and was leased to the South Side on May 10, 1873.

The South Side entered receivership on November 9, 1873, and was sold on September 16, 1874 to the Poppenhusens, who also controlled the Flushing, North Shore and Central Railroad. The South Side was reincorporated as the Southern Railroad of Long Island on September 25, 1874. The two Poppenhusen lines were connected at Babylon, and the Southern's branch to Hempstead was abandoned temporarily after only two years of operation. The Southern Hempstead Branch Railroad was incorporated on July 1, 1875 as a reorganization of the New York and Hempstead, and the Southern began operating it shortly thereafter. It was however closed permanently in May 1879, since Hempstead was already served adequately from the north (effectively the LIRR's current Hempstead Branch).

=== Acquisition by the LIRR ===
On January 26, 1876, the Poppenhusens acquired the LIRR. The line beyond Bushwick to Williamsburg was abandoned February 26, making the line to Bushwick a branch; passenger trains operated over a new connection into the LIRR's Long Island City terminal. The LIRR leased the Southern on May 3, 1876. In June, the Southern became the main passenger route from Long Island City to Jamaica; most passenger trains on the Southern from Jamaica east to Springfield Gardens were rerouted to the LIRR's Springfield Branch. This route east of Jamaica is still the main one for trains using the ex-Southern (Montauk Branch) east of Valley Stream, but the "Lower Montauk" west of Jamaica has not been used by passenger trains since 2012.

However, the LIRR entered receivership in late 1877, and the Southern was reorganized on November 20, 1879 as the Brooklyn and Montauk Railroad, The Brooklyn and Montauk opened an extension from Patchogue to Eastport to connect to the LIRR's Sag Harbor Branch in 1881, and on October 5, 1889 it was merged into the LIRR.

The majority of the Southern is still intact; only its Hempstead Branch, Bushwick-Williamsburg line, and Far Rockaway Branch west of Hammels have been abandoned. The Far Rockaway Branch from Far Rockaway to Hammels has been part of the New York City Subway's IND Rockaway Line since 1956.
