= Long Island City station =

Long Island Rail Road station in New York

Long Island City
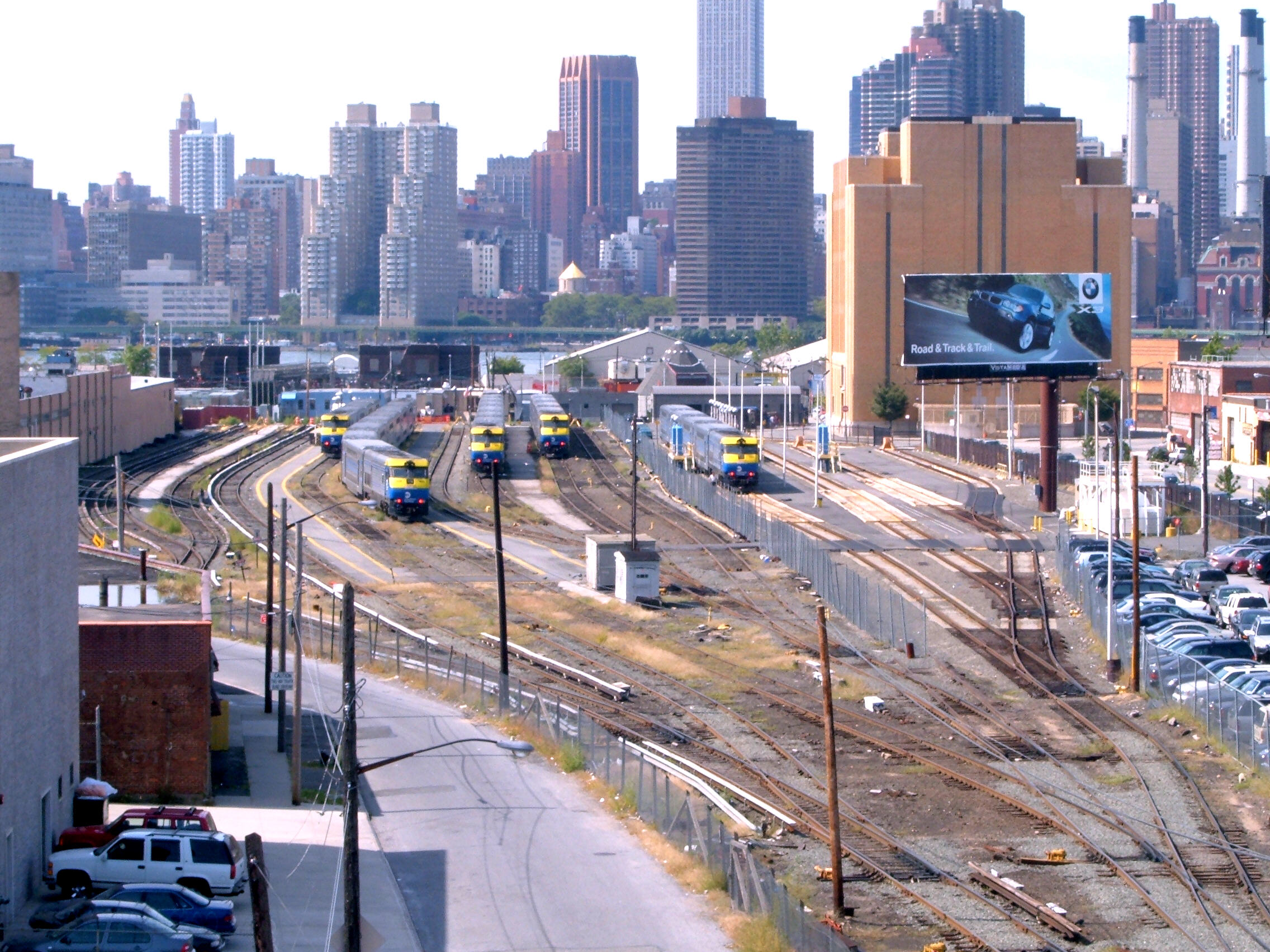
- Looking west at the Long Island City station (to the right of the fence) and yard (to its left)

General information
- Location: Borden Avenue and Second Street; Hunters Point and Long Island City, Queens, New York
- Coordinates: 40°44′29″N 73°57′25″W
- Owner: Long Island Rail Road
- Lines: Main Line; Montauk Branch
- Platforms: 3 island platforms (two employees only)
- Tracks: 13
- Connections: New York City Subway: at Vernon Boulevard–Jackson Avenue; New York City Bus: B32, B62 (at 11th Street and Jackson Avenue); MTA Bus: Q101, Q103; NYC Ferry East River, Lower East Side, and Astoria routes (at Center Boulevard and Borden Avenue)

Construction
- Parking: Yes
- Accessible: Yes

Other information
- Station code: LIC
- Fare zone: 1

History
- Opened: June 26, 1854
- Rebuilt: 1861, 1870, 1875, 1878, 1879, April 1881, July 1891, April 26, 1903
- Electrified: June 16, 1910; 750 V (DC) third rail (Tracks 9-12 only)
- Former names: Hunter's Point

Passengers
- 2012—2014: 101 per weekday
- Rank: 110 of 125

Services
Preceding station	Long Island Rail Road	Following station
Terminus	Port Jefferson Branch limited service	Hunterspoint Avenue toward Port Jefferson
Terminus	Oyster Bay Branch limited service	Hunterspoint Avenue toward Oyster Bay
Terminus	Montauk Branch limited service	Hunterspoint Avenue toward Montauk
Former services
Preceding station	Long Island Rail Road	Following station
Terminus	Main Line	Hunterspoint Avenue toward Greenport
Terminus	Montauk Division	Penny Bridge toward Montauk
Location

The Long Island City station is a rail terminal of the Long Island Rail Road in the Hunters Point and Long Island City neighborhoods of Queens, New York City. Located within the City Terminal Zone at Borden Avenue and Second Street, it is the westernmost LIRR station in Queens and the end of both the Main Line and Montauk Branch. The station consists of one high-level passenger platform located at ground level and is wheelchair accessible.

== Service ==
The Long Island City station is served only during weekday rush hours in the peak direction by select diesel trains on the Oyster Bay, Montauk, or Port Jefferson Branches via the Main Line. Due to this limited service, it gets only 101 riders per weekday, making it the second least used LIRR station in New York City (after Mets–Willets Point).

All trains serving the station reach the station via the Main Line. Until November 2012, some LIRR trains also ran via the Lower Montauk Branch to and from this station, despite all Lower Montauk Branch stations being shuttered and losing service in March 1998.

== History ==
The Long Island City station was first built on June 26, 1854, and rebuilt seven times during the 19th century. On December 18, 1902, both the two-story station building and office building owned by the LIRR burned down. The rebuilt, and fire-proof, station opened on April 26, 1903. Electric service to the station began on June 16, 1910.

Before the East River Tunnels were built, the Long Island City station served as the terminus for Manhattan-bound passengers from points east on Long Island, who took ferries to the East Side of Manhattan – specifically to the East 34th Street Ferry Landing in Murray Hill, and the James Slip Ferry Port in what is today part of the Two Bridges section of Lower Manhattan. The passenger ferry service was abandoned on March 3, 1925. A track spur split from the Montauk Branch east – and running along the southern border – of the Long Island City station, before curving north to the North Shore Freight Branch running between 48th and 49th Avenues, where there were connections to car floats at what is today the Gantry Plaza State Park. These car floats carried freight trains to and from Manhattan and New Jersey until the mid-20th century. As of 2026, passenger ferry service is operated by NYC Ferry.

The station house was torn down again in 1939 for construction of the Queens–Midtown Tunnel, but continued to operate as an active station throughout the tunnel's construction and opening.

== Station layout ==
This station has 13 tracks and three concrete high-level island platforms. The northernmost platform, Platform A, is two cars long and is accessible from Borden Avenue just west of Fifth Street. Platforms B and C are located within the secure area of the rail yard.

All tracks without platforms are used for train storage. The southernmost six tracks are powered by third rail, while the remaining are only used by diesel-powered trains.

== Gallery ==
Long Island City

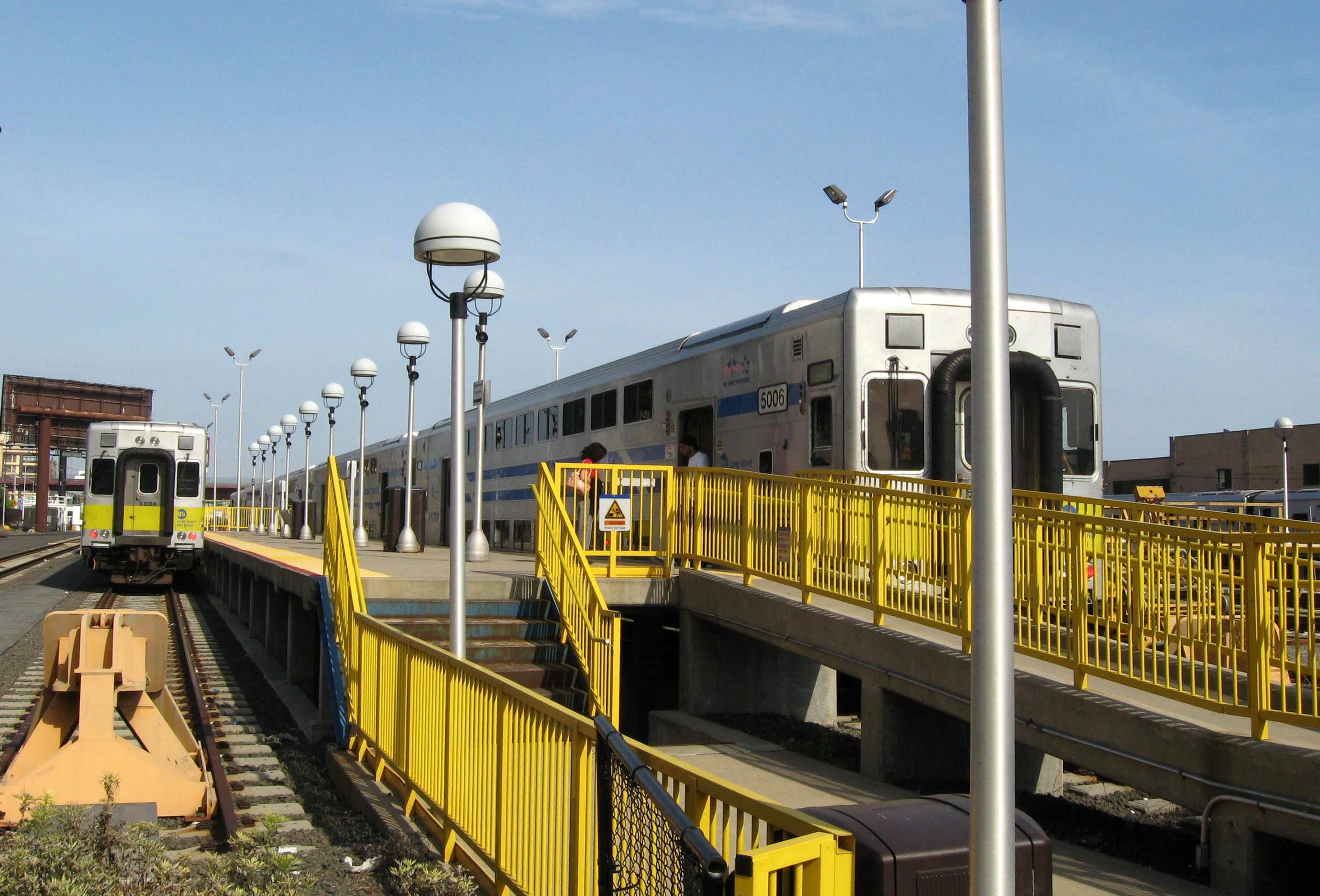
Two trains on a Tuesday

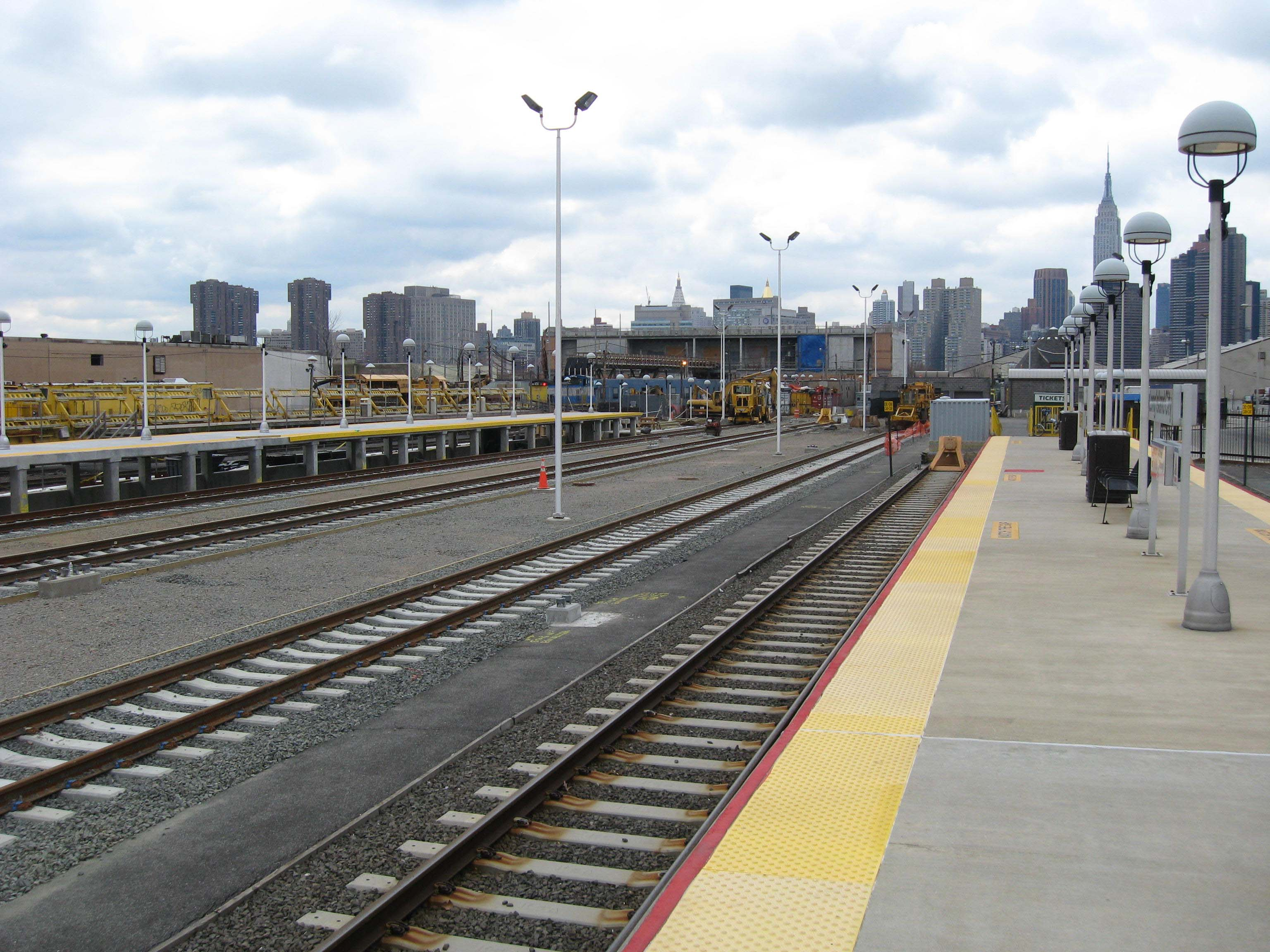
Idle on a Sunday

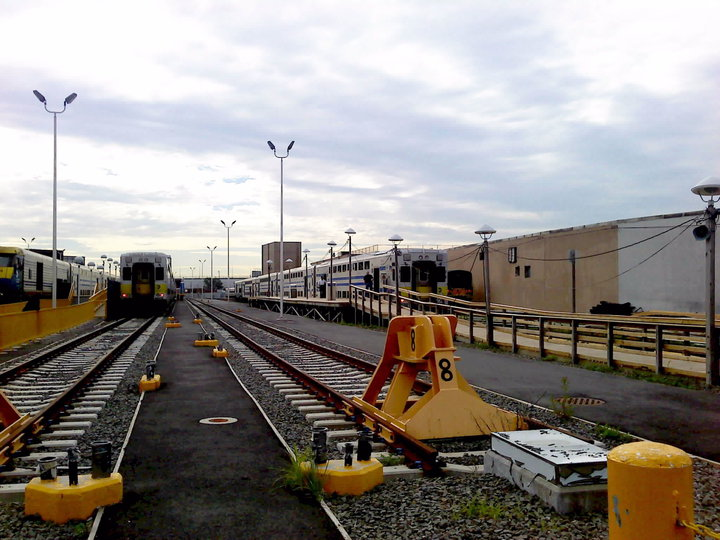
The wooden platform on a Wednesday morning

== See also ==
- List of Long Island Rail Road stations
- Atlantic Terminal
- Hunterspoint Avenue station (LIRR)
