= List of streetcar lines on Long Island =

The following streetcar lines once operated on Long Island, New York in Queens, Nassau, and Suffolk Counties. Many of these systems were owned by the Long Island Consolidated Electrical Companies, a holding company partially owned by the Long Island Rail Road, and Interborough Rapid Transit Company between March 30, 1905, and July 18, 1935.

== Babylon Railroad ==
The Babylon Railroad Company began in 1870 as a horse-drawn trolley from the South Side Railroad's Babylon Station to the Fire Island Ferry. After the Central Railroad of Long Island opened in 1873 passengers could access the horse car to the Great South Bay at the Watson House. A second line was opened from Babylon Station into Amityville in 1910.

Name	From	Route	To	Notes
Fire Island Line	Babylon Station	Deer Park Avenue and Fire Island Avenue to ferry at Great South Bay.	Great South Bay Ferry	Abandoned May 15, 1920.
Amityville Line	Babylon Station	Trolley Line Road and Union Avenue.	Amityville 1910 (station 1912)	Abandoned May 15, 1920.

== Cedarhurst Railway ==
The Cedarhurst Railway Company ran a line from Woodmere (LIRR station) to Brosewere Bay where the Rockaway Hunt Club and Rockaway Steeplechase Association were located.

Name	From	To	Route	Notes
Cedarhurst Railway	Woodsburgh Railroad Station	Brosewere Bay	Wood Lane, Railroad Avenue, Rutherford Lane.	Abandoned 1894.

== Echo Line Railroad ==
The Echo Line was a trolley line that ran from Port Jefferson Harbor to Port Jefferson (LIRR station) in what was then the Hamlet of Echo, New York. It was acquired by the Suffolk Traction Company to be merged into the main trolley line to Patchogue, but collapsed along with the rest of Suffolk Traction Company.

Name	From	To	Route	Notes
Echo Line	Port Jefferson Harbor	Port Jefferson Station	Main Street, East Main Street, East Broadway.	Abandoned in 1919.

== Freeport Railroad Company ==
The Freeport Railroad Company owned and operated a year-round trolley route in Freeport, New York, and leased from the connecting Great South Bay Ferry Company that portion of the latter's route between Front Street and Ellison's dock. The Freeport Railroad Company and the Great South Bay Ferry Company were commonly controlled. Service was inaugurated on August 5, 1913. Service ended on or about November 8, 1917, and on July 13, 1918, the trolley route was sold to the Great South Bay Ferry Company.

Name	From	To	Route	Notes
Fishermen's Delight	Freeport LIRR station	Nautical Mile	Grove Street (now Guy Lombardo Boulevard), Front Street, then south to Ellison's dock on Little Swift Creek, using private right-of-way between Miller Avenue and South Ocean Avenue	Served the ferry to Point Lookout. Sold in 1918. Replaced by n62 bus via Guy Lombardo Blvd. (abandoned in 2017)

== Garden City Shuttle ==
In the early-20th Century, the Long Island Rail Road installed a trolley line that ran along the former CRRLI Main Line between Garden City Station and Plainedge from 1915 to 1933. A connection to Country Life Press station was established in 1927. Trolleys were replaced by MP41's and later MP54's.

Name	From	To	Route	Notes
Long Island Rail Road	Garden City Station	Salisbury Plains	Central Branch	Terminal changed in 1927 to Country Life Press
Long Island Rail Road	Country Life Press Railroad Station	Salisbury Plains	LIRR Central Branch.	1933, Trolley Car replaced by MP41s, 1949 by MP54s.

== Glen Cove Railroad ==
The Glen Cove Railroad was one of two trolley lines that ran from the Sea Cliff Railroad Station. The route was north in private right of way alongside the LIRR to Glen Street station and from there in streets on a circuitous route through the City of Glen Cove. The line existed between 1905 and November 15, 1924.

Name	From	To	Route	Notes
Glen Cove Railroad	Sea Cliff Railroad Station	Glen Cove Waterfront	right of way, Glen Street, School Street, Cottage Row, Mill Street, The Place, Ellwood Street, Clement Street, Carpenter Street, Landing Road.	Abandoned 1924. Split up between current n27 bus route, and City of Glen Cove bus loop route.

== Great South Bay Ferry Company ==
The Great South Bay Ferry Company operated a summer-only trolley route in Freeport, New York, connecting with its ferries to and from Point Lookout, New York. Its route was initially owned by the Long Beach Transportation Company which was then leased to the Great South Bay Ferry Company for operation. Service was inaugurated on May 27, 1905, between Atlantic Avenue and Front Street; from May 26, 1906, service was extended to operate the full route between Atlantic Avenue and Ellison's dock on Little Swift Creek. On or about March 4, 1907, the ferry company became a subsidiary of a holding company, the newly incorporated Seashore Municipal Railroad Company. On September 27, 1907, the Long Beach Transportation Company was merged into the Great South Bay Ferry Company; thereafter the ferry company was the owner of the trolley route. The larger ambitions of the Seashore Municipal Railroad Company were not realized, and by 1913 it was practically defunct. The southern portion of the route, between Front Street and Ellison's dock, was leased to the Freeport Railroad Company in 1913. The Great South Bay Ferry Company and the Freeport Railroad Company were commonly controlled. On July 13, 1918, the trolley route of the Freeport Railroad Company was purchased and became part of the ferry company's summer-only trolley operations. Service probably ended on or about September 30, 1921.

Name	From	To	Route	Notes
Great South Bay Ferry Company	Freeport Atlantic Avenue	Nautical Mile	Atlantic Avenue, Freeport, south to Ellison's dock on Little Swift Creek, using private right-of-way between Miller Avenue and South Ocean Avenue	Served the ferry to Point Lookout. Abandoned in 1921. Currently occupied by condominiums. n62 bus via Guy Lombardo Blvd. (abandoned in 2017)
Fishermen's Delight	Freeport LIRR station	Nautical Mile	Grove Street (now Guy Lombardo Boulevard), Front Street, then south to Ellison's dock on Little Swift Creek, using private right-of-way between Miller Avenue and South Ocean Avenue	Served the ferry to Point Lookout. Purchased in 1918; abandoned in 1921. Replaced by n62 bus via Guy Lombardo Blvd. (abandoned in 2017)

== Huntington Railroad ==
The Huntington Railroad was established on July 19, 1890, with a trolley line between Huntington Village and Halesite. It was eventually extended to Huntington Railroad Station, then along what is today mostly NY 110 through Melville, Farmingdale, and as far south as the docks of Amityville.

Name	From	To	Route	Notes
Huntington Railroad	Halesite	Amityville	Wincoma Drive, East Shore Drive, New York Avenue, Walt Whitman Road, Amityville Road, Broad Hollow Road, Conklin Street, Main Street(Farmingdale), Broadway, Sterling Place, Greene Street, Bennett Place, Richmond Avenue.	Service ended September 23, 1919. Current SCT 1 bus route.

== Huntington Traction Company ==
The Huntington Traction Company was the successor to the Huntington Railroad Company inheriting the original line between Huntington Railroad Station and Halesite. The company ran the line only as far south as Jericho Turnpike until it was finally abandoned in 1927.

Name	From	To	Route	Notes
Huntington Traction Company	Halesite	South Huntington	Wincoma Drive, East Shore Drive, New York Avenue, Walt Whitman Road.	Abandoned in 1927. Northern portion of current SCT 1 route.

== Nassau County Railway ==
The Nassau County Railway ran from the Sea Cliff Railroad Station through the Village of Sea Cliff to the top of the "cable road" incline that went down to the dock. The trolley was in operation from July 2, 1902, to December 31, 1924.

Name	From	To	Route	Notes
	Sea Cliff Railroad Station	Sea Cliff Landing	Sea Cliff Avenue, Glen Cove Avenue, Glen Avenue, Main Avenue, Twelfth Avenue, to Prospect Avenue, near the incline	Abandoned 1924. Incorporated into current n21 bus route.

== New York and Long Island Traction ==
The New York and Long Island Traction Company operated east to Freeport, Hempstead, and Mineola in Nassau County.

Name	From	To	Route	Notes
Mineola Line	Queens Village (Becomes Long Island Electric Railway at the Queens-Nassau Line)	Mineola	Jamaica Avenue	abandoned April 3, 1926 now the n24 bus
Jamaica-Hempstead Line	Jamaica (Becomes Long Island Electric Railway at the Queens-Nassau Line)	Freeport	160th Street Jamaica to Belmont Park on 160th Street, Jamaica Avenue, and Hempstead Avenue(Turnpike)	Joint NY&LI-LIER service; abandoned April 3, 1926 Current n6 bus.
Brooklyn-Freeport Line	Brooklyn (Becomes Long Island Electric Railway at the Queens-Nassau Line)	Freeport	Rockaway Boulevard, North Conduit Avenue, and Sunrise Highway	abandoned April 3, 1926 Current n4 & n36 bus.

== New York and North Shore Traction ==
The New York and North Shore Traction Company operated from northeastern Queens east into Nassau County. It was established in 1902 and was originally known as the "Mineola Roslyn & Port Washington Traction Company," then renamed 1907.

Name	From	To	Route	Notes
North Shore Line	Flushing, Queens	Roslyn	35th Avenue, 39th Avenue, and Northern Boulevard	abandoned 1920 now the n20 bus
Port Washington Line	Port Washington	Mineola	Main Street (Port Washington), Port Washington Boulevard, Middle Neck Road (Flower Hill), Old Northern Boulevard, Main Street (Roslyn), Roslyn Road, Railroad Avenue, Roslyn (LIRR station), Warner Avenue, Mineola Avenue, Willis Avenue.	abandoned 1920; Now the n23 bus.
Hicksville Line	Mineola	Hicksville	Westbury Avenue, Maple Avenue, Post Road, Union Avenue, Prospect Avenue, West John Street.	abandoned 1920; Includes part of the n22 bus.

== Northport Traction Company ==
The Northport Traction Company operated from the Northport East Railroad Station into downtown Northport Village.

Name	From	To	Route	Notes
Northport Traction Company	Northport East Station	Northport Village	Larkfield Avenue, Laurel Avenue, Main Street, Woodbine(Cherry) Avenue by Northport Harbor.	abandoned 1924 now includes some of the HART H40 bus route.

== South Shore Traction Company ==
The South Shore Traction Company was based in Sayville, New York. It had plans to expand into Patchogue and north through Bohemia, Lake Ronkonkoma, St. James and Stony Brook towards Port Jefferson, not to mention through Nassau and Queens County. However, because it was unable to break through the monopoly of the LIRR-held lines in Nassau County, it sold off its two original lines to the Suffolk Traction Company.

Name	From	To	Route	Notes
	Sayville Railroad Station	Sayville at the Great South Bay	Railroad Avenue, Montauk Highway, Candee Avenue	Acquired by Suffolk Traction Company, then abandoned. Part of current S57/S59 bus route.
Bayport-Blue Point Line	Sayville Railroad Station	Blue Point	Middle Road, Oakwood Avenue, Railroad Street/Maple Street, Blue Point Avenue, Montauk Highway	Acquired by Suffolk Traction Company, then abandoned. Part of S40 bus route.

== Suffolk Traction Company ==
The Suffolk Traction Company operated between Patchogue, Canaan Lake, and Holtsville in Suffolk County. It also had lines to Medford, Blue Point, Bayport, and even a connection to Sayville. The Sayville, and Bayport-Blue Point Lines were originally owned by the South Shore Traction Company. Plans to extend the main trolley to Port Jefferson failed, even as a bridge was being built over the LIRR Main Line. Another extension that was never built included a line towards Bellport and Brookhaven.

Name	From	To	Route	Notes
Main Line	Patchogue Railroad Station	Holtsville	South Ocean Avenue, North Ocean Avenue, Old North Ocean Avenue, Suffolk Traction Boulevard	Abandoned. Segments of the ROW no longer exist north of the Canaan Lake neighborhood.
Medford Line	Patchogue Railroad Station	Medford	Unknown (Presumably, the current NY 112).	Abandoned. Part of current SCT 55 bus route.
Bayport-Blue Point Line	Sayville Railroad Station	Patchogue at Medford Avenue	Middle Road, Oakwood Avenue, Railroad Street/Maple Street, Blue Point Avenue, Montauk Highway	Abandoned. Served Bayport, Blue Point, and went as far east as what is today NY 112. Part of current SCT 2 bus route.
Sayville Line	Sayville Railroad Station	Sayville at the Great South Bay	Railroad Avenue, Montauk Highway, Candee Avenue	Abandoned.

== See also ==
- List of streetcar lines in Queens
- List of streetcar lines in Brooklyn
