= Huntington Railroad =

Overview
- Locale: Western Suffolk County, New York; Farmingdale in Nassau County, New York
- Termini: Halesite (now Huntington Bay); Amityville

Service
- Type: Horsecar (1890-1897), then Streetcar (1897-1927)
- Operator(s): Long Island Rail Road (1898-1927)

History
- Opened: 1890; 1920 (as Huntington Traction Company)
- Closed: 1919; 1927

Technical
- Line length: 18.50 miles
- Track gauge: 4 ft 8 1/2 in (1,435 mm)
- Minimum radius: (?)
- Electrification: Overhead wires

The Huntington Railroad was established on July 19, 1890 (although some sources claim it was in May, 1890) with a trolley line between Huntington Village and Halesite (now partially in the Village of Huntington Bay) on Long Island, New York. It was eventually extended to Huntington Railroad Station, then along what is today mostly NY 110 through Melville, Farmingdale, and as far south as the docks of Amityville. Huntington Railroad had only one line throughout its history, although the length varied through the years.

Transit service is currently provided along the corridor by the route 1 bus, operated by Suffolk County Transit.

== History ==
The Huntington Railroad Company was chartered in May, 1890, and began operating on July 19, 1890 as a three-mile horsecar line between Halesite, New York through Downtown Huntington to Huntington Railroad Station. The Long Island Rail Road acquired control of this company on March 5, 1898, and transformed it into an electric trolley on June 17, 1898.

Control was transferred to an LIRR subsidiary called the Long Island Consolidated Electric Companies. The extension of the Huntington Railroad by the LICEC from Huntington to Amityville, was completed and put in operation on August 6, 1909. This line was 18.50 miles in length and reached from the harbor at Huntington to Great South Bay at Amityville, thus transformed Huntington Railroad into the only cross-island trolley on Long Island. Attempts to create other cross-island trolleys by the South Shore Traction Company and Suffolk Traction Company failed. Nassau County had trolleys that spanned the county, but they were never run by a single company.

From north to south the streets that the railroad ran along included Wincoma Drive, East Shore Drive, New York Avenue, Walt Whitman Road, Amityville Road, Broad Hollow Road, Conklin Street, Main Street (Farmingdale), Broadway, Sterling Place, Greene Street, Bennett Place, Richmond Avenue. Part of the right-of-way in Melville between Duryea Road and north of Old Country Road is today a realigned segment of NY 110. The former section is now known simply as Walt Whitman Road.

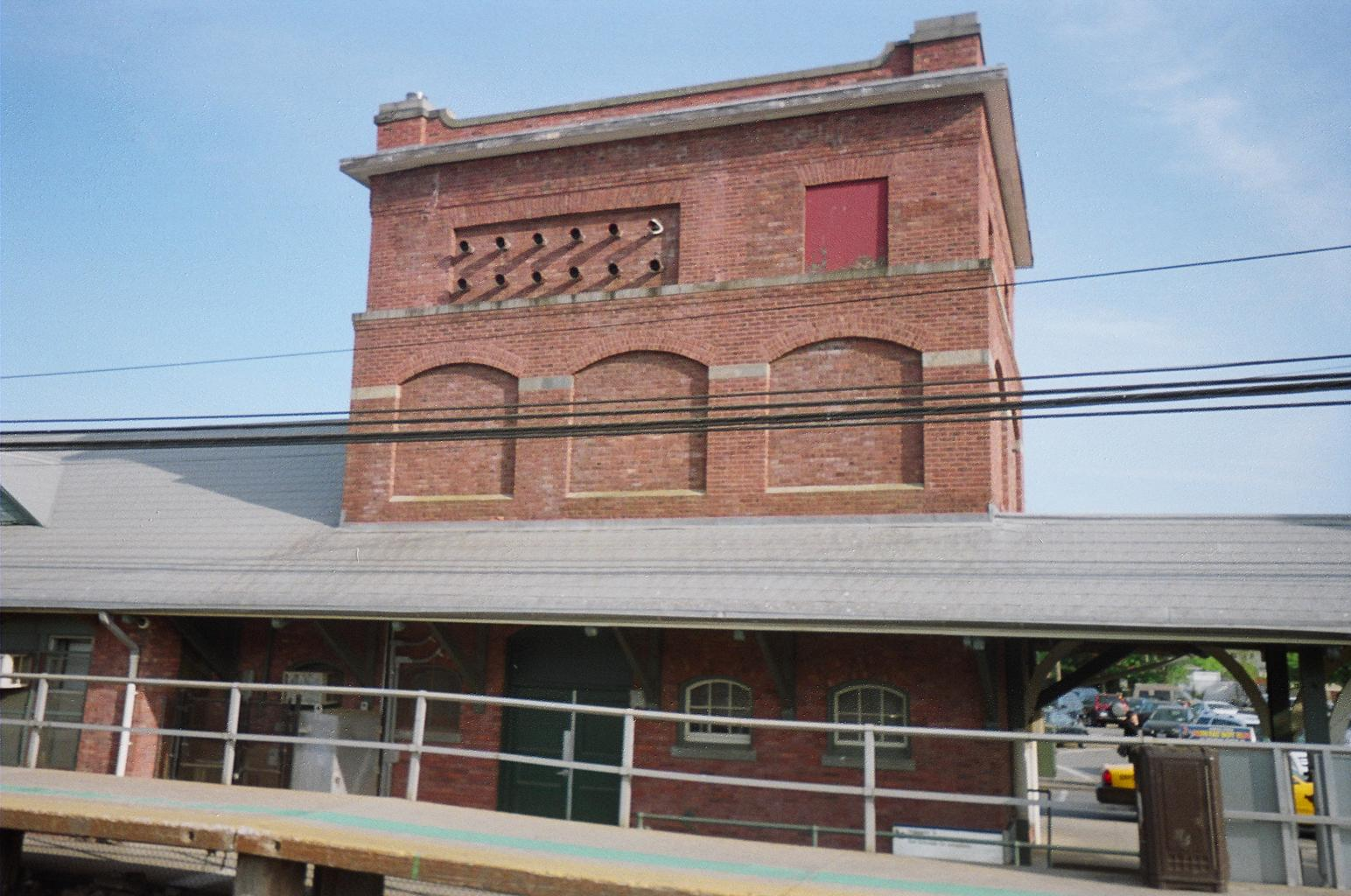
Farmingdale Station still has the supports for Huntington Railroad's overhead wires.

As a cross-island line, the Huntington Railroad served all three Long Island Rail Road stations in its vicinity: Huntington Station, Farmingdale Station and Amityville Station. A tower at Farmingdale Station was the sub-station for powering trolleys. Between Sterling Place and Greene Street in Amityville, another separate ROW leading to a bridge for trolleys over the Montauk Branch existed just along the west side of Amityville Station. In addition, Amityville Station also provided a connection to the Amityville Line of the Babylon Railroad, which was established in 1910, and lasted two years after the original line of the Babylon Railroad ceased to operate.

Trolley service began to decline at the end of World War I, due to the cost of the war and the rise in the use of automobiles. Therefore, the LIRR prepared to remove involvement with trolleys. Huntington Railroad service ended on September 23, 1919, however, that was not the end of trolleys in western Suffolk County.

== Huntington Traction Company ==
The Huntington Traction Company was the successor to the Huntington Railroad Company, inheriting the original line between Huntington Railroad Station and Halesite. The company ran the line only as far south as Jericho Turnpike in South Huntington, and used the same wires from the Huntington Railroad. Huntington Traction Company only used Wincoma Drive, East Shore Drive, New York Avenue, and Walt Whitman Road along its route. With the increasing use of buses, Huntington Traction couldn't compete either. The line was finally abandoned in 1927.
