= Bayport station =

Former train station in New York, US

Coordinates: 40°44′42″N 73°3′22″W

Bayport
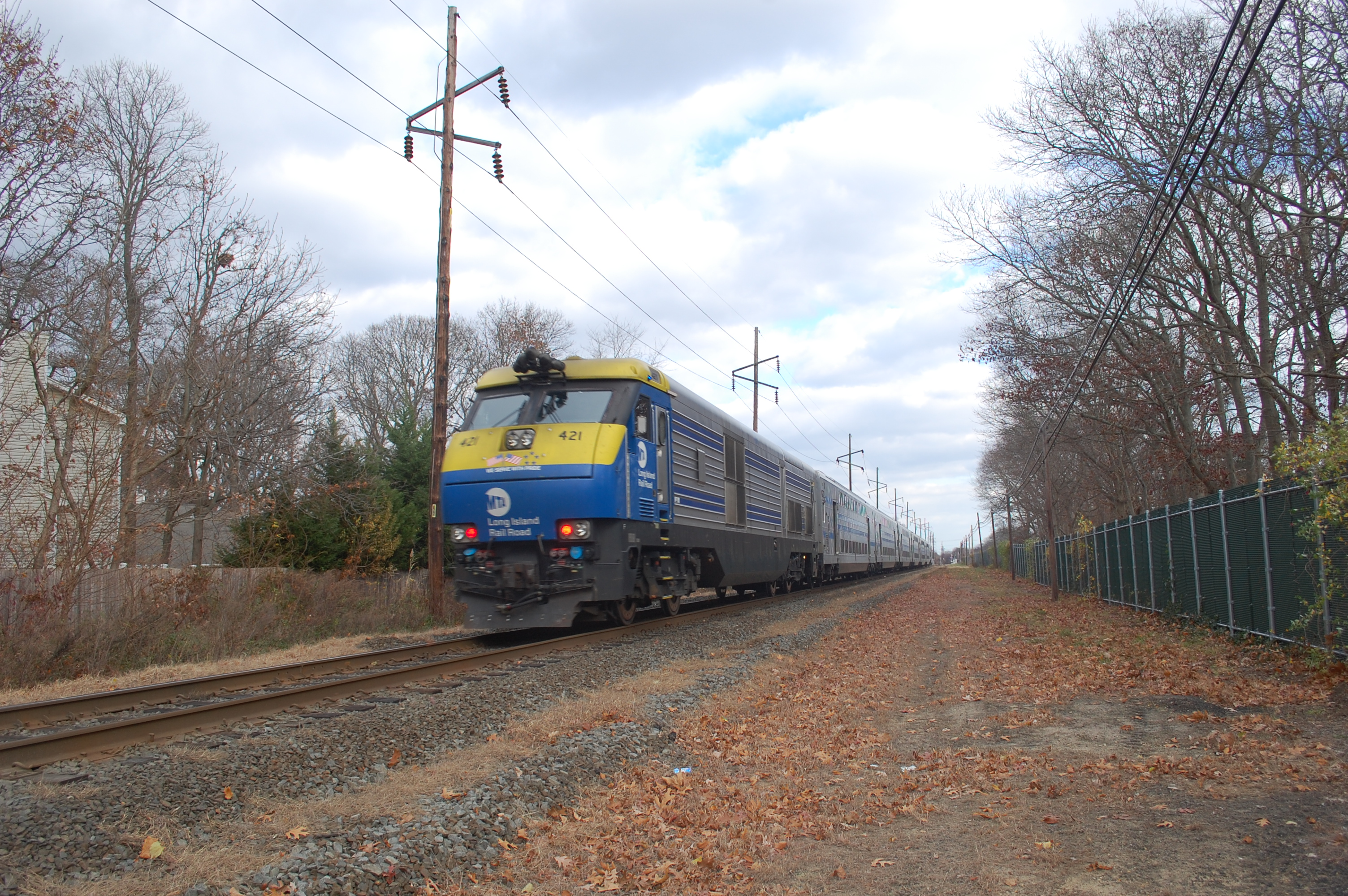
- LIRR DE30AC #421 passes the site of the former Bayport station on the Montauk Line.

General information
- Location: Railroad Street between Oakwood and Snedecor Avenues; Bayport, New York
- Owner: Long Island Rail Road
- Platforms: 1 side platform
- Tracks: 2 when station was open, 1 currently

Other information
- Station code: None
- Fare zone: 10

History
- Opened: March 1869
- Closed: 1980
- Rebuilt: 1903

Former services
Preceding station	Long Island Rail Road	Following station
Sayville toward Long Island City	Montauk Branch	Blue Point toward Montauk
Location

Bayport was a station stop along the Montauk Branch of the Long Island Rail Road. It was located on Railroad Street between Oakwood and Snedecor Avenues in Bayport, New York, and was the easternmost station along the Montauk Branch in the Town of Islip.

== History ==
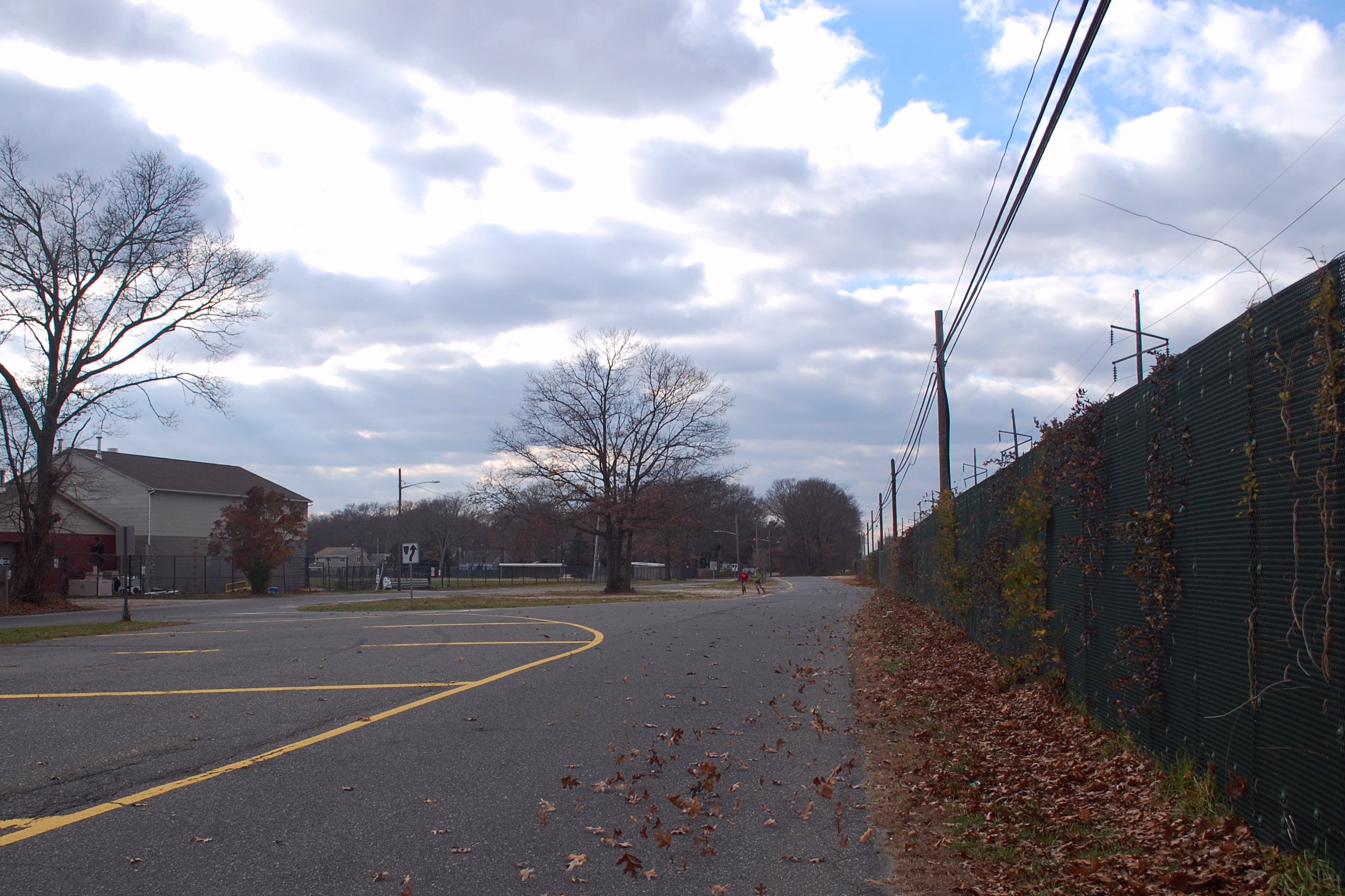
Railroad Street in Bayport at the former station site

The depot location was donated by Wilhelm Steins, who emigrated from The Principality of Waldeck to Bayport and settled much of what is now Bayport Avenue.

This depot was located on the northeastern corner of Bayport Ave and Railroad Avenue across from the then-famous Frieman Hotel. It was opened in March 1869 by the South Side Railroad of Long Island and was razed around 1903.

Designed by Bradford Gilbert, the second depot opened on August 10, 1903, and contained a passing siding, sometimes used for freight. Additionally, it had a connection to the South Shore Traction Company trolleys, which were later replaced by Suffolk Traction Company trolleys.

The barrel factory was closed in 1938 and replaced by a Gulf Oil Company distributor. The station closed on September 6, 1980. The station was located between Sayville and Blue Point Stations, the latter of which also closed on the same day. The structure was razed at some point. The former station site is evidenced by the wide profile of Railroad Avenue in the station's vicinity, which includes a median that is sometimes used as overflow parking by students of Bayport-Blue Point High School, which is located directly south of the former station site.
