= Blue Point station =

Former train station in New York, US

Blue Point
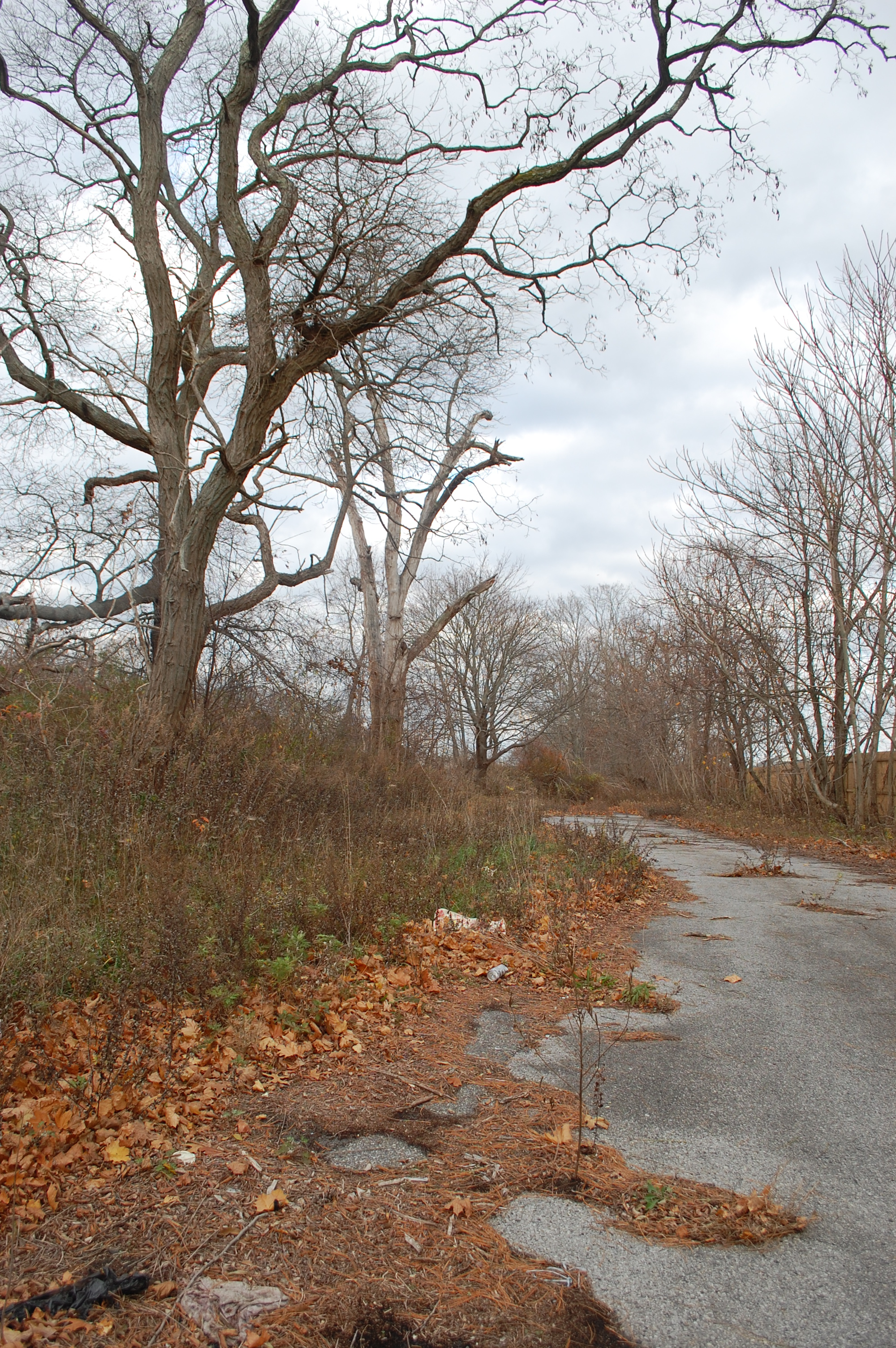
- The driveway to LIRR's Blue Point station on the Montauk Line (closed) near the Blue Point Avenue Overpass

General information
- Location: Blue Point Avenue; Blue Point, New York
- Coordinates: 40°45′6.9″N 73°2′11.5″W
- Owner: Long Island Rail Road
- Platforms: 1 side platform (south side of tracks)
- Tracks: 1

Other information
- Station code: None
- Fare zone: 10

History
- Opened: 1870
- Closed: 1882, 1980
- Rebuilt: 1900

Former services
Preceding station	Long Island Rail Road	Following station
Bayport toward Long Island City	Montauk Branch	Patchogue toward Montauk
Location

Blue Point was a station stop along the Montauk Branch of the Long Island Rail Road It was located on Martha Avenue on the south side of the tracks in Blue Point, New York, and was the westernmost station along the Montauk Branch in the Town of Brookhaven. Access to the station was through a driveway that emptied onto Blue Point Avenue. The station was originally opened on February 1, 1870, by the South Side Railroad of Long Island and closed on June 1, 1882. The second depot opened around June, 1900, evidently in conjunction with the bridge over Blue Point Avenue. The newer station also had a connection to the South Shore Traction Company trolleys, which were later replaced by Suffolk Traction Company trolleys. Blue Point station closed on September 6, 1980. It was located between Bayport and Patchogue stations, the former of which also closed on the same day. It was located between Bayport and Patchogue stations. The former station site, across from the Blue Point Wine & Liquor store, remains, to this day, gated off, and covered partially in trees, leaves, and weeds. Somewhat recently, the former site has been used by LIRR workers as a storage yard for road vehicles and equipment, being cleaned up in the process.

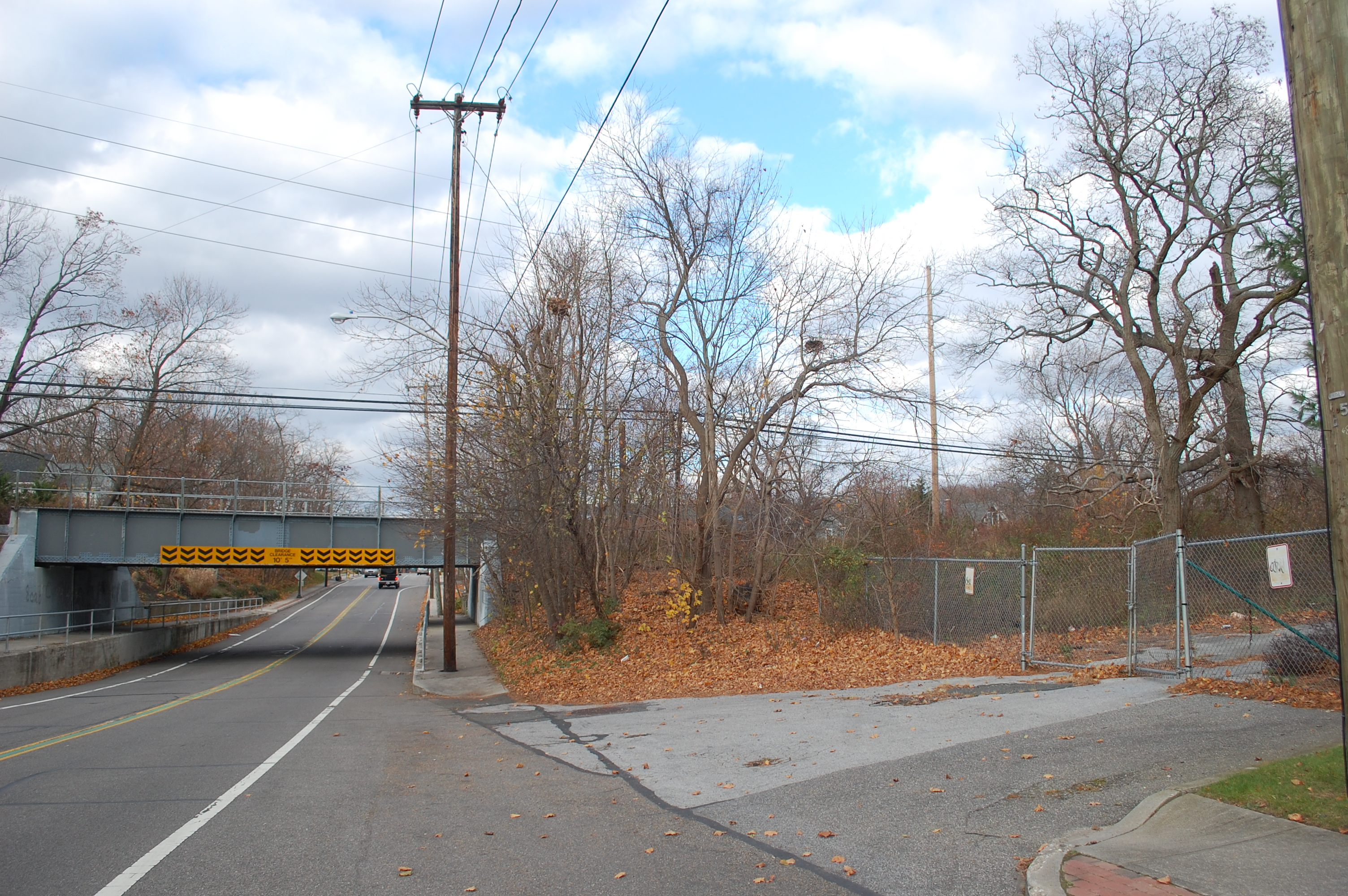
Long Island Rail Road's Blue Point Ave "Tunnel" in Blue Point, NY on the Montauk Line, along with the former station area (gated off) near Milepost 43.
