= Northport Traction Company =

- A Northport Traction Co trolley down Main Street in Northport, sometime between 1902 and 1909.

Overview
- Locale: Western Suffolk County, New York
- Termini: East Northport; Northport Harbor

Service
- Type: Streetcar (1902-1924)
- Operator(s): Long Island Rail Road (1902-1924)

History
- Opened: 1902
- Closed: 1924

Technical
- Line length: 2.74 miles (4.41 km)
- Track gauge: Broad gauge
- Electrification: Overhead wires

Northport Traction Company was a trolley service in the Town of Huntington in New York. It ran from 1902 to 1924 and served East Northport and Northport, New York. The company only had one line throughout its history which ran from Northport (LIRR station) to Northport Harbor, at what is today Cow Harbor Park. Unlike Huntington Railroad to the west, Northport Traction Company never expanded beyond either Northport or East Northport, and no record exists of any proposal to do so.

== History ==
In 1868, the Hicksville and Syosset Railroad, a subsidiary of the Long Island Rail Road extended their line to Northport, Unlike the stations in Cold Spring Harbor, and Huntington which were bypassed after both towns had arguments with Oliver Charlick over the locations of those stations, Northport station was located in the village at what is now the lumber yard at 219 Laurel Avenue (just north of what is now New York State Route 25A). However, in 1873, the Smithtown and Port Jefferson Railroad opened from a mile south of Northport to Port Jefferson, which included another station called New Northport Station that was actually in East Northport. turning the old line into Northport into the Northport Branch, the result of another argument between Charlick and Northport.

Old Northport Station was abandoned on October 17, 1899, and the Northport Branch was used as a freight line throughout much of the 20th Century. After losing rail passenger service in downtown Northport, and seeking the same benefits of trolleys further west in Huntington, the Northport Traction Company was established by the LIRR on April 17, 1902. The line began at "Northport East Station" and ran along Larkfield Road to the fork in the road between Laurel Road and Vernon Valley Road, where it turned northwest down Laurel Road. Crossing Fort Salonga Road (now NY 25A) onto Laurel Avenue the trolley passed the site of the old Northport Station. Approaching Main Street, it used a right of way between 23 and 25 Laurel Avenue, and emerged between 438 and 444 Main Street, where it took a left turn onto Main Street. It continued west to Cherry (now Woodbine) Avenue. From there the line took a short southbound turn along Cherry Avenue before making a right turn into a car barn at Northport Harbor, near what is today Northport Memorial Park.

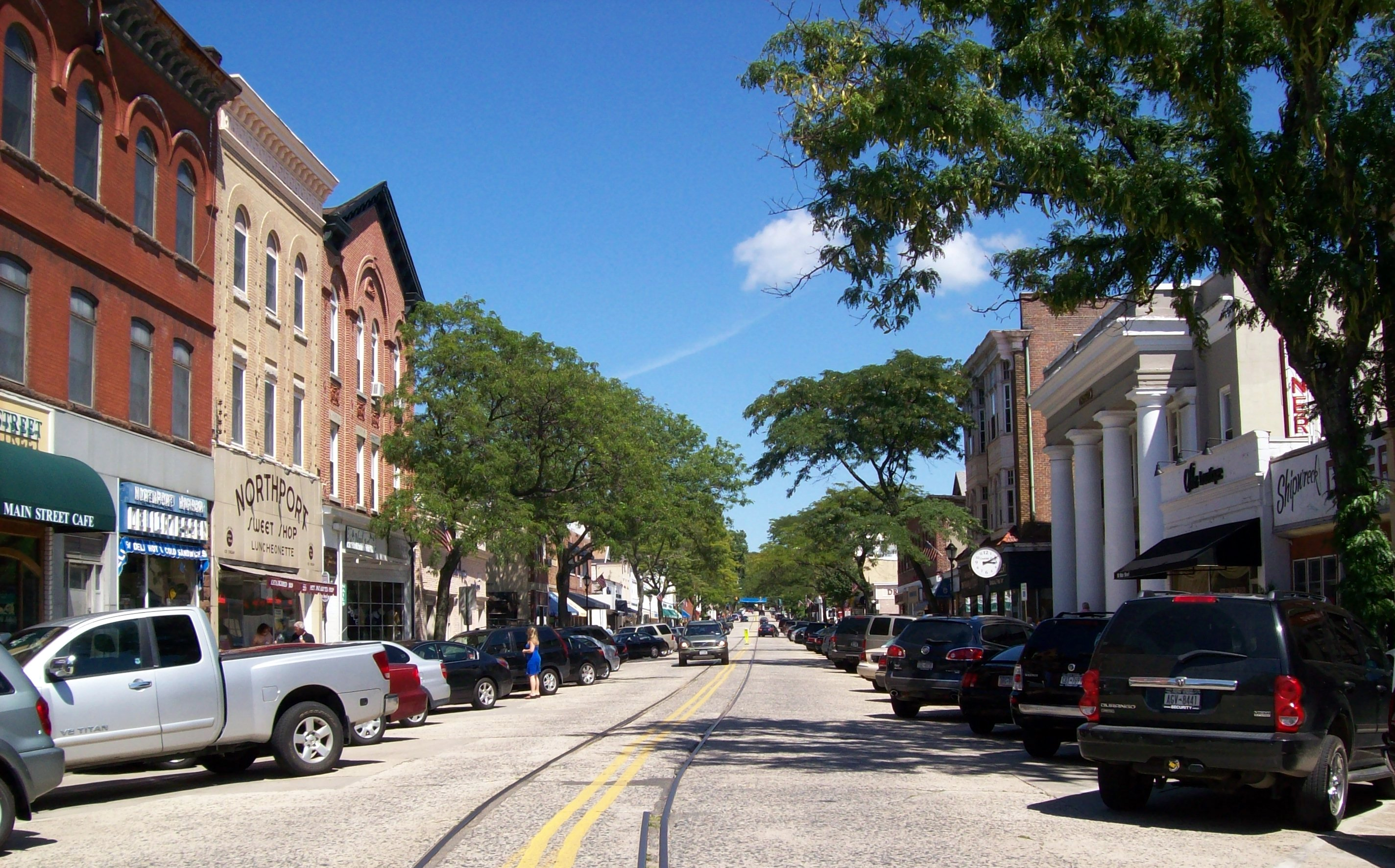
Main Street in more recent times, where the former trolley tracks can still be found in the pavement.

As with many trolley lines throughout the country, the use of the service began to decline at the end of World War I, due to the cost of the war and the rise in the use of automobiles. Therefore, the LIRR prepared to remove involvement with trolleys, and in 1924 the line was abandoned. Part of the HART H40 bus route uses the route of the former trolley line. The remnants of the line can still be found along some streets, especially Main Street, which includes buildings listed on the National Register of Historic Places.
