= Greenlawn station =

Long Island Rail Road station in Suffolk County, New York

Greenlawn
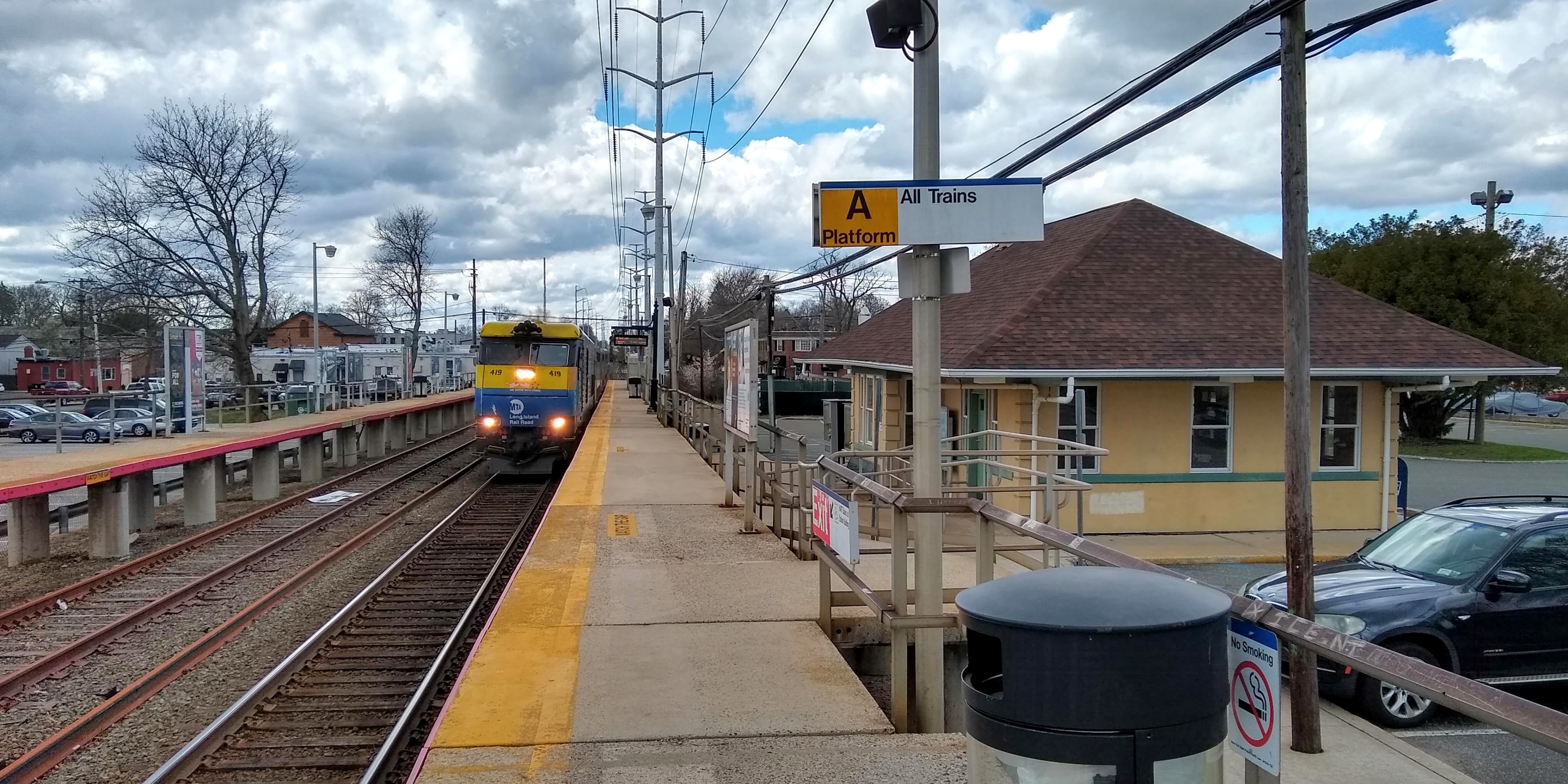
- Greenlawn's station house in 2022.

General information
- Location: Broadway (CR 86) and Boulevard Avenue; Greenlawn, New York
- Coordinates: 40°52′7.17″N 73°21′46.70″W
- Owner: Long Island Rail Road
- Platforms: 2 side platforms
- Tracks: 2
- Connections: Huntington Area Rapid Transit: H30

Construction
- Parking: Yes; free and residential permits
- Cycle facilities: Yes
- Accessible: Yes

Other information
- Station code: GWN
- Fare zone: 9

History
- Opened: 1868
- Rebuilt: 1985
- Former names: Centerport, Greenlawn–Centerport

Passengers
- 2012—2014: 1,010 per weekday

Services
Preceding station	Long Island Rail Road	Following station
Huntington toward Penn Station or Long Island City	Port Jefferson Branch diesel service	Northport toward Port Jefferson
Former services
Preceding station	Long Island Rail Road	Following station
Huntington toward Hicksville	Wading River Branch	Northport toward Wading River
Terminus	Northport Branch	Northport Village Terminus
Location

Greenlawn is a station on the Port Jefferson Branch of the Long Island Rail Road near the intersection of Boulevard Avenue and Broadway (CR 86) in Greenlawn, New York, a few blocks north of Pulaski Road. It is the first station east of Huntington on the non-electrified section of the branch.

== History ==
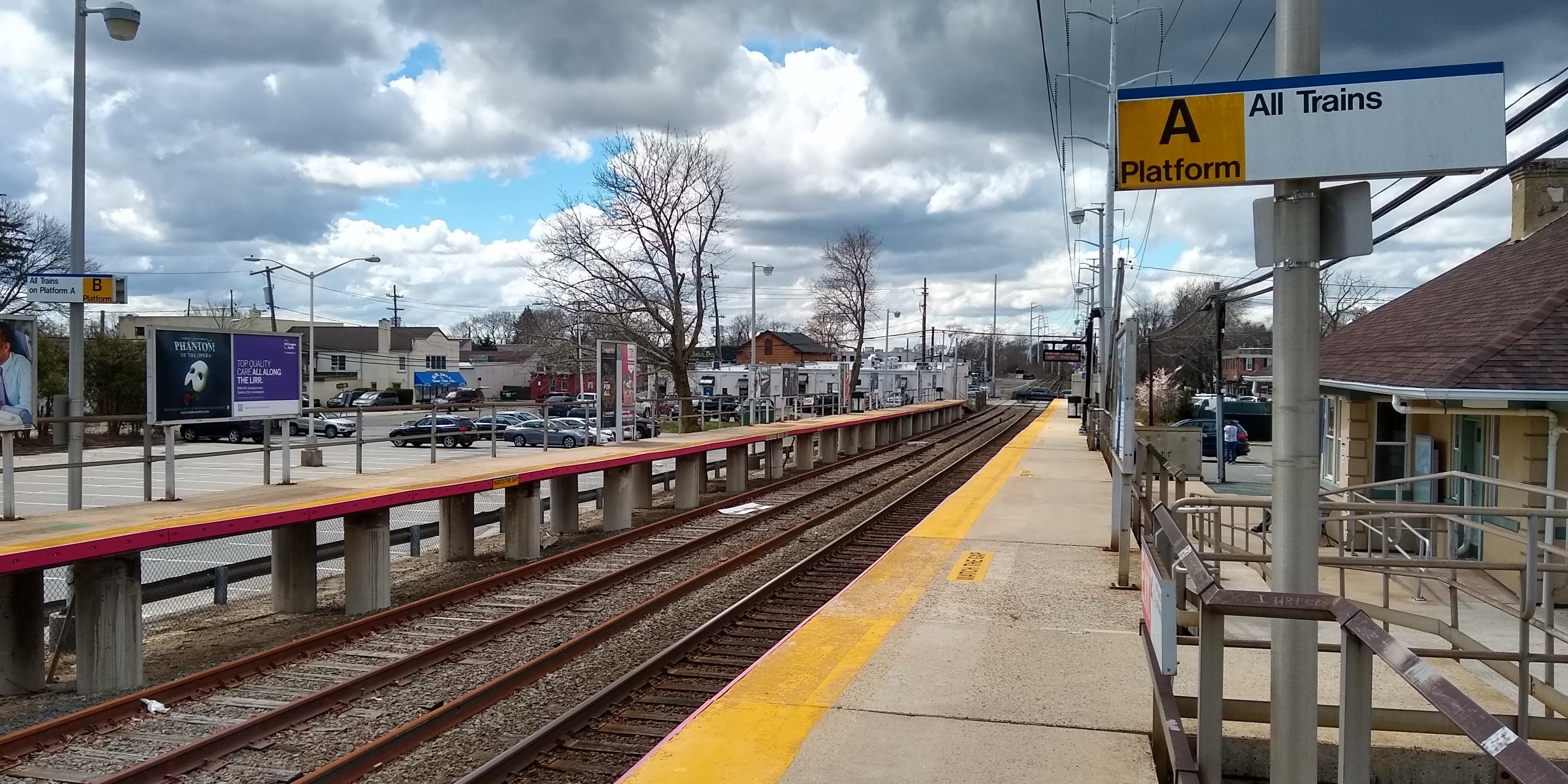
Station platforms; all trains stop at platform A

Greenlawn was originally known as Old Fields, but the first railroad station was named Centreport as it was meant to serve the village of Centerport, located about 1.5 miles (2.4 km) to the north. In the span of a decade, it was changed to Greenlawn–Centerport and then finally Greenlawn to reflect the new community that had developed around the railroad station.

The first depot was built in 1868 by the Hicksville and Cold Spring Branch Railroad, renamed "Greenlawn" in 1870, burned down on September 29, 1910, and was replaced by the current building in September 1911. The station building was painted with green trim (reflecting the station locale) in the 1990s, after having been painted light blue for several decades. The station had a ticket agent until 1996. In 2017, the station building received a new asphalt roof.

The station is about 1 mile (1.6 km) west of the former junction of the Northport Branch, a freight-only railroad spur into Northport built in 1868: it was abandoned in 1978. A team track for off-line customers of the New York and Atlantic Railway exists just west of the station. It is sporadically used. The platform on the south side of the station is not used. The switches for the siding are hand-operated, not remotely controlled by DIVIDE Tower in Hicksville, thus making it impractical for everyday LIRR use. The siding is mostly used by work trains and, on rare occasions, by New York and Atlantic Railway freight trains.

High-level platforms and a pedestrian bridge were added at Greenlawn station in 1985. These renovations were made in anticipation of planned electrification of the branch from Huntington to Port Jefferson, which has yet to occur.

== Station layout ==
The station has two high-level side platforms. The north platform, next to the main track, is 12 cars long. The south platform, next to the siding, is eight cars long, and is not in regular use. There is also a pedestrian bridge connecting the two platforms. On either ends of the station, the two tracks merge into one.
