= Oakdale station =

Long Island Rail Road station in Suffolk County, New York

Oakdale
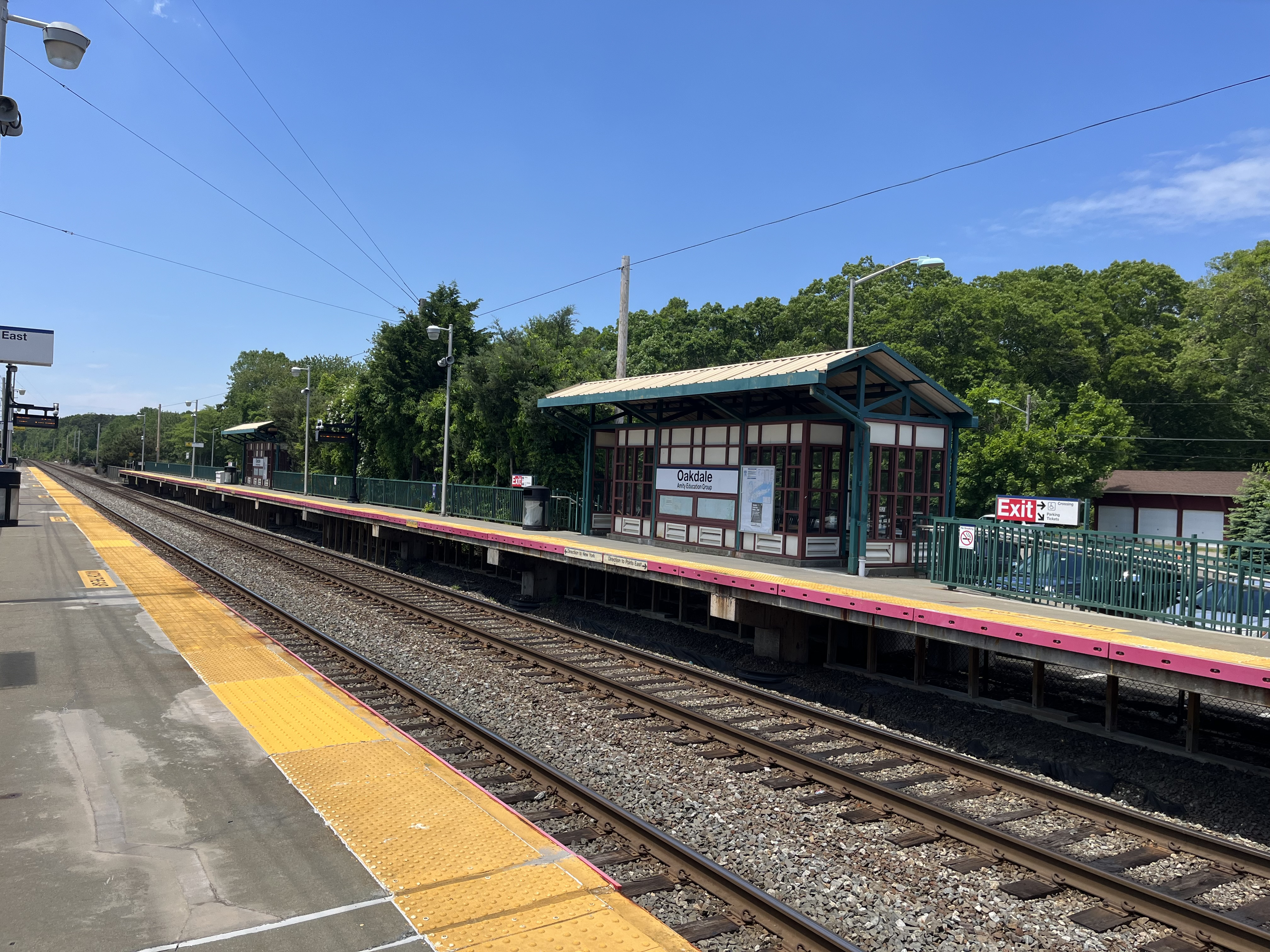
- Oakdale station in 2024

General information
- Location: Montauk Highway & Oakdale–Bohemia Road; Oakdale, New York
- Coordinates: 40.7434°N 73.1324°W
- Owner: Long Island Rail Road
- Platforms: 2 side platforms
- Tracks: 2
- Connections: Suffolk County Transit: 2

Construction
- Parking: Yes (free)
- Accessible: Yes

Other information
- Station code: ODL
- Fare zone: 10

History
- Opened: 1868 (SSRRLI)
- Rebuilt: 1890

Passengers
- 2012—2014: 498 per weekday
- Rank: 97 of 125

Services
Preceding station	Long Island Rail Road	Following station
Great River toward Penn Station or Long Island City	Montauk Branch	Sayville toward Montauk
Former services
Preceding station	Long Island Rail Road	Following station
Great River toward Long Island City	Montauk Division	Sayville toward Montauk
Location

Oakdale station is a railroad station on the Montauk Branch of the Long Island Rail Road, on the corner of Oakdale-Bohemia Road and Montauk Boulevard in Oakdale, New York. The station has two high-level side platforms, each four cars long.

== History ==
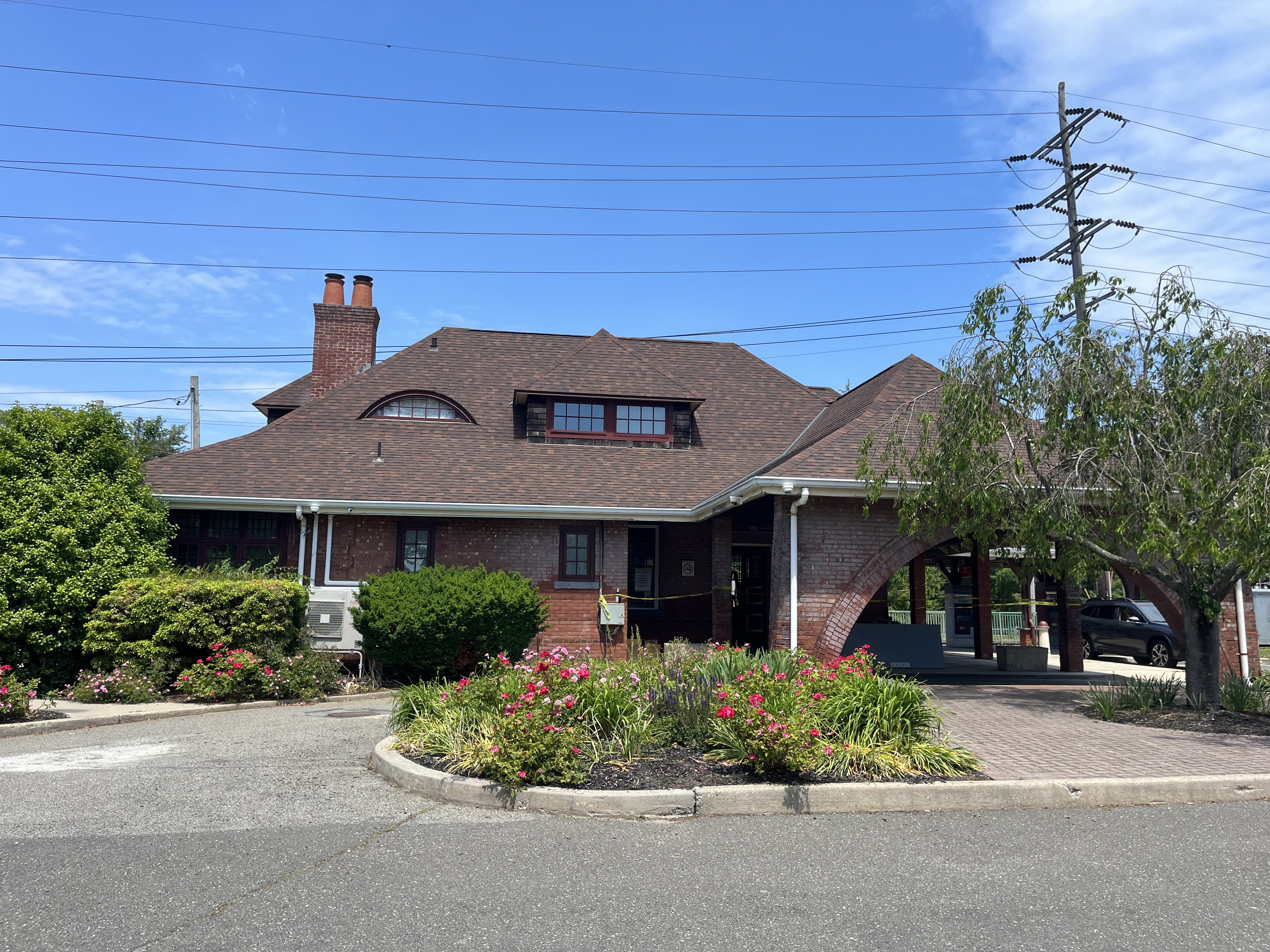
The station building in 2024

Oakdale station was originally built as a depot by the South Side Railroad of Long Island in 1868, and was larger than most SSRRLI depots. It was razed in 1890 and a second station built in December of that year. Legend has it that the station was rebuilt in order to be suitable for guests arriving at the wedding of Consuelo Vanderbilt. As a result, the station is often referred to as "the wedding station." On December 10, 1994, the station lived up to its given nickname by hosting an actual wedding in front of the fireplace in the waiting room. Oakdale station also included carriage stables and a freight house that was active until the 1970s. This freight house now serves a storage facility for the Long Island Rail Road. The carriage stables were demolished at some point. High-level platforms were added in the late-1990s.
