= East Shore Road Historic District =

Historic district in New York, United States

- U.S. National Register of Historic Places
- U.S. Historic district
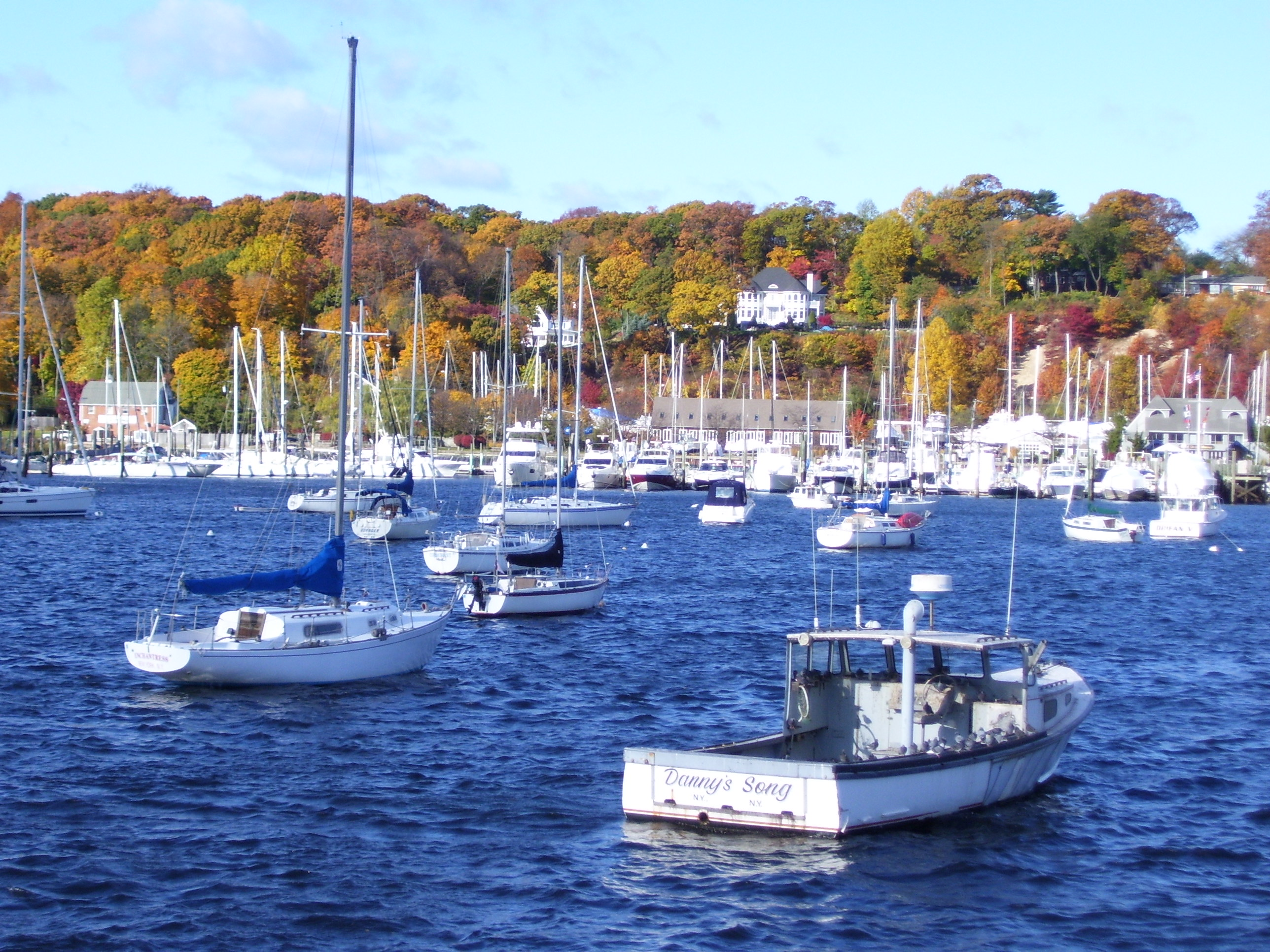
- Huntington Harbor as seen from the East Shore Road Historic District in Halesite, New York

- Location within New York Location within the United States
- Location: East Shore Rd., Halesite, New York
- Coordinates: 40°53′27″N 73°25′0″W
- Area: 12 acres (4.9 ha)
- Architectural style: Colonial Revival, Late Victorian, Eclectic
- MPS: Huntington Town MRA
- NRHP reference No.: 85002521
- Added to NRHP: September 26, 1985

East Shore Road Historic District is a national historic district located at Halesite in Suffolk County, New York. The district has 21 contributing buildings, one contributing site, and one contributing structure. The majority of the residences date from 1860 to 1900 and represent one of the few intact collections of largely intact working class dwellings in Huntington. It also contains three settlement period dwellings, the site of a pottery works, and the Town Park.

It was added to the National Register of Historic Places in 1985.
