= Great River station =

Long Island Rail Road station in Suffolk County, New York

Great River
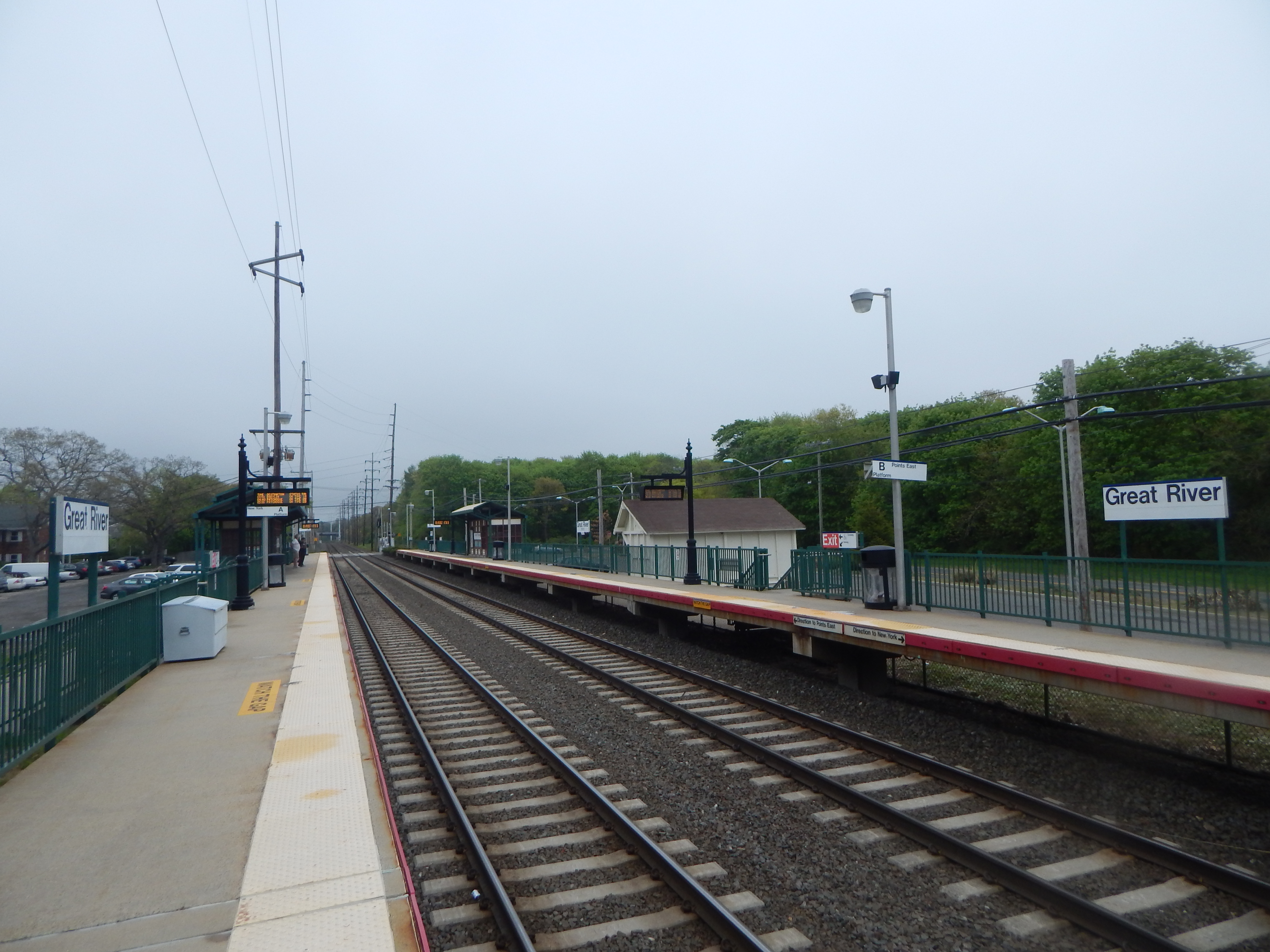
- Great River station in May 2015.

General information
- Location: Connetquot Avenue & Hawthorne Avenue; East Islip, New York
- Coordinates: 40.740476°N 73.17°W
- Owner: Long Island Rail Road
- Platforms: 2 side platforms
- Tracks: 2

Construction
- Parking: Yes (free)
- Accessible: yes

Other information
- Station code: GRV
- Fare zone: 10

History
- Opened: 1897
- Rebuilt: 1943, 2001

Passengers
- 2012—2014: 310
- Rank: 104 of 125

Services
Preceding station	Long Island Rail Road	Following station
Islip toward Penn Station or Long Island City	Montauk Branch	Oakdale toward Montauk
Former services
Preceding station	Long Island Rail Road	Following station
Islip toward Long Island City	Montauk Division	Oakdale toward Montauk
Location

Great River is a railroad station on the Montauk Branch of the Long Island Rail Road, at Connetquot Avenue and Hawthorne Avenue in East Islip, New York. The station opened in 1897.

== History ==
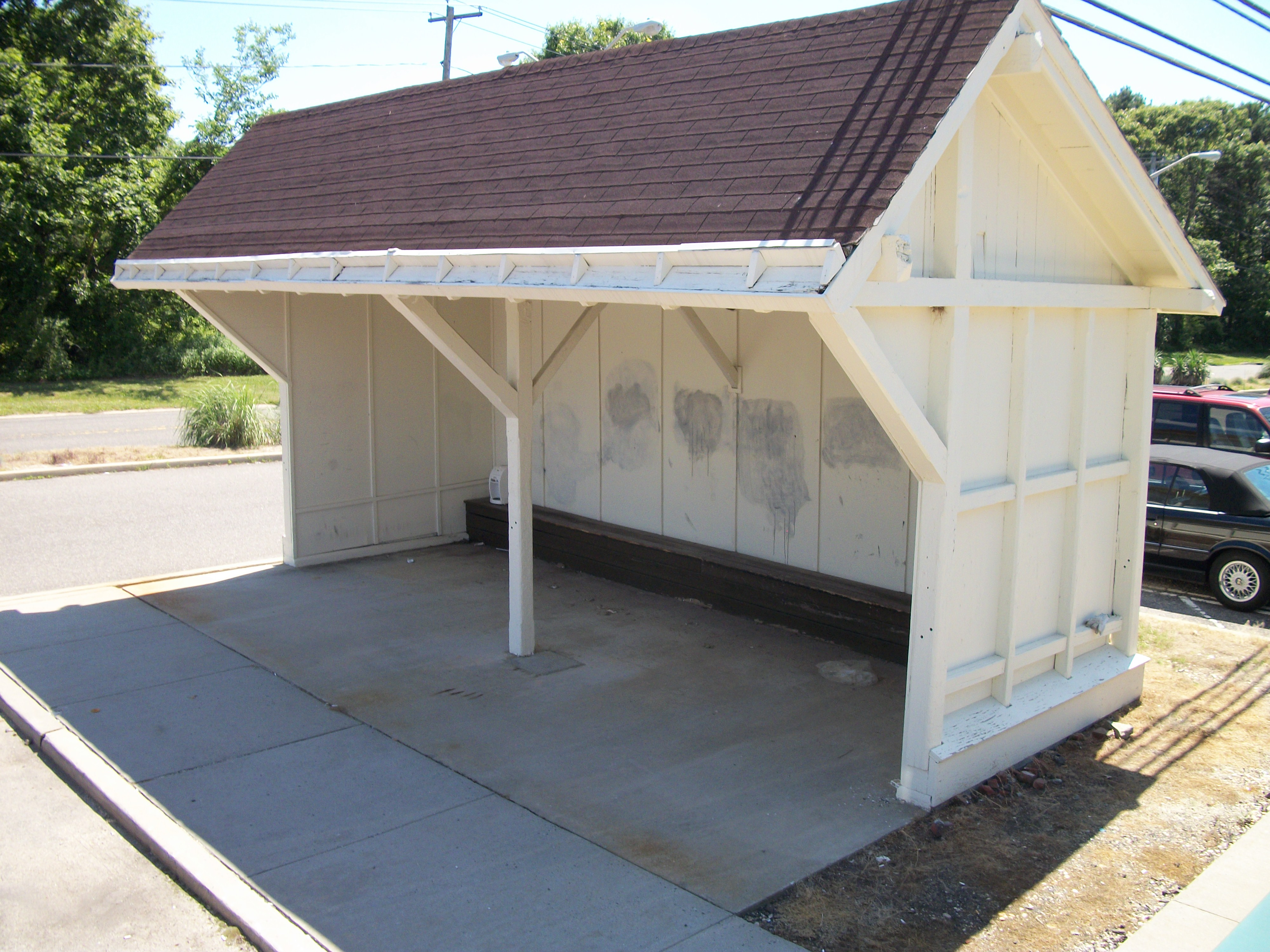
The old LIRR shed at Great River station.

Prior to the establishment of passenger service, the site of Great River station was occupied by a freight-only station built by the South Side Railroad of Long Island (SSRRLI) known as Youngsport station. The station opened in 1897, and the original station building burned down in 1943. Between that time, a sheltered-platform was added to the other side of the tracks. In 1945, a modernist station designed by architect Antonin Raymond replaced it, but it was burned down in 2000. The third station with high-level platforms was built in the late 1990s. The original shelter, however was restored by the East Islip Historical Society, and remains within one of the parking lots along the eastbound platform.

=== Club House station ===
East of Great River Station, the South Side Railroad built a private station called Club House station in 1869 to serve the South Side Sportsmen's Club. This station was located between Mileposts 45 and 46 inside today's Bayard Cutting Arboretum, and was among a number of privately owned stations along the SSRRLI, which were not so uncommon during the 19th Century. It was closed in 1897.

== Station layout ==
The station has two tracks and two four-car long high-level side platforms.

== Notable places nearby ==
- Connetquot River State Park
- Bayard Cutting Arboretum
- Heckscher State Park
