= Babylon Railroad =

Horsecar line in New York

Babylon Rail Road

Overview
- Locale: Babylon Village

Service
- Type: Horsecar, then Streetcar

History
- Opened: 1871
- Closed: 1920

Technical
- Track gauge: 4 ft 8 1/2 in (1,435 mm)
- Electrification: Overhead lines

The Babylon Rail Road was a horsecar line in Babylon Village, New York, later converted to a trolley line. It was opened in 1871 and ceased operations in 1920.

The line's main purpose was to provide transportation between the Long Island Rail Road station at the north end of the village center, to ferries for Jones Beach and Fire Island destinations. In 1910 Babylon Railroad established a second line to Amityville Station. They also planned a connection to the South Shore Traction Company (later Suffolk Traction Company) in Sayville, New York that was never built. By 1918, the original line of the Babylon railroad ceased to operate, and the Babylon-Amityville Line was terminated two years later.
