= Bay Shore station =

Long Island Rail Road station in Suffolk County, New York

Bay Shore
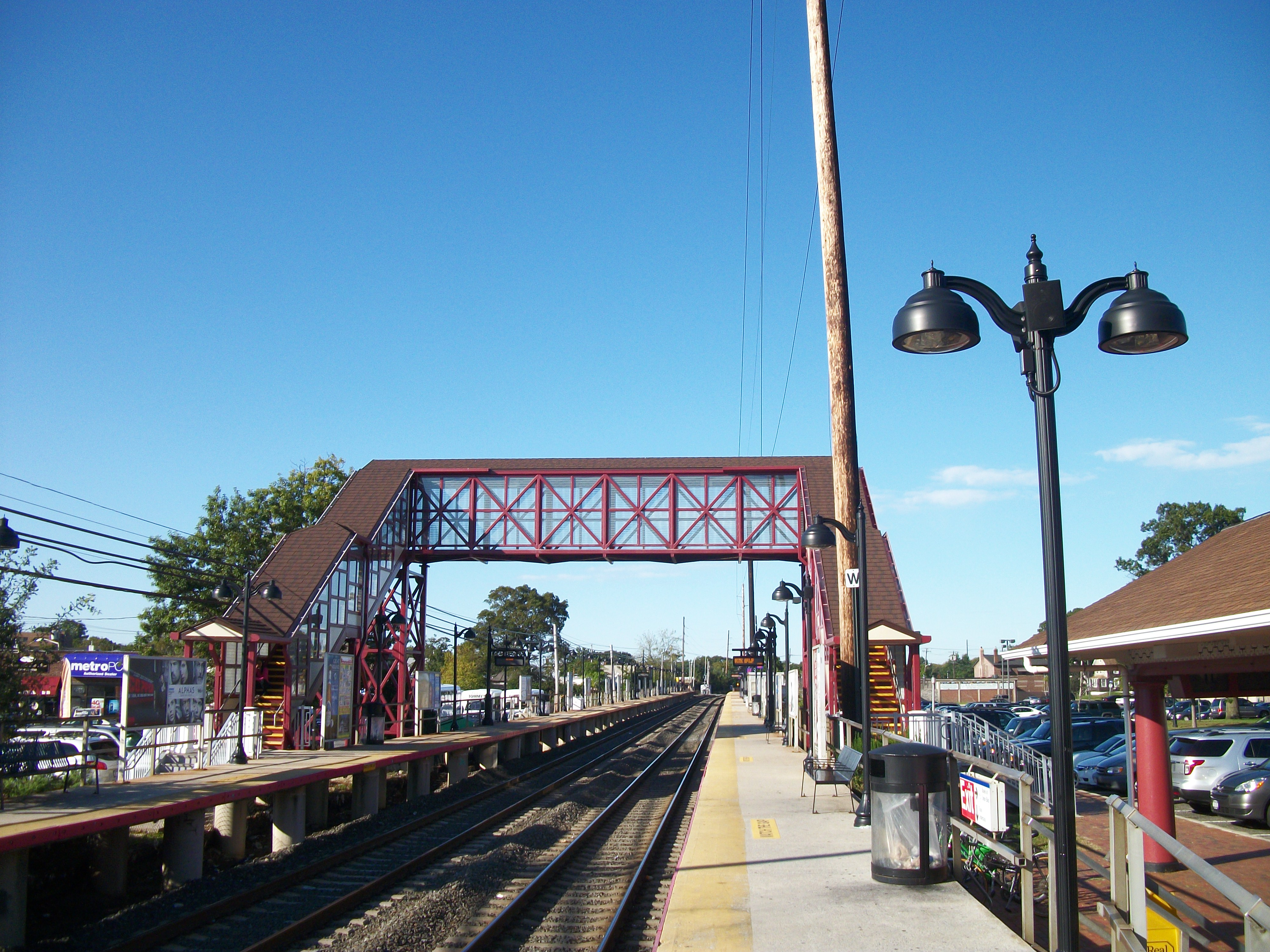
- Bay Shore station, looking towards the pedestrian bridge in 2012

General information
- Location: Railroad Plaza & Park Avenue; Bay Shore, New York
- Coordinates: 40.72505°N 73.253057°W
- Owner: Long Island Rail Road
- Platforms: 2 side platforms
- Tracks: 2
- Connections: Suffolk County Transit: 2, 7, 11, 12

Construction
- Parking: Yes (paid)
- Cycle facilities: Yes
- Accessible: yes

Other information
- Station code: BSR
- Fare zone: 10

History
- Opened: May 20, 1868 (SSRRLI)
- Rebuilt: 1882, 1912
- Former names: Pentaquit (May–July 1868)

Passengers
- 2012—2014: 1,431
- Rank: 63 of 125

Services
Preceding station	Long Island Rail Road	Following station
Babylon toward Penn Station or Long Island City	Montauk Branch	Islip toward Montauk
Former services
Preceding station	Long Island Rail Road	Following station
Babylon toward Long Island City	Montauk Division	Islip toward Montauk
Location

Bay Shore (signed as Bay Shore Fire Island Ferries) is a major railroad station on the Montauk Branch of the Long Island Rail Road, located on Park Avenue and Oak Street in Bay Shore, New York, to the north of Union Boulevard (CR 50) and west of Fourth Avenue. Ferries to Fire Island board from a nearby port located to the station's south.

== History ==
Bay Shore station was built by the South Side Railroad of Long Island (SSRRLI) on May 20, 1868, as Penataquit station only to be renamed Bay Shore station in July 1868. It was replaced in 1882 and replaced again on July 17, 1912, in the style typical of stations such as Riverhead, Manhasset, Northport, and Mineola. The station also had a freight yard nearby.

High-level platforms were added in 1984. The entrance to the station previously had decorative pillars on the sides, and a railroad hotel once existed behind the station plaza. It is one of the few stations on the LIRR with two station buildings, though only the westbound station house remains open to the public. An underground pedestrian tunnel once connected the two station houses, until a pedestrian bridge was built in 2009. The new overpass was constructed as part of a larger renovation project, replacing platform lighting and adding new platform waiting shelters.

== Station layout ==
The station has two high-level side platforms, each 12 cars long. There are two large parking lots on each side of the tracks.
