= Islip station (LIRR) =

Long Island Rail Road station in Suffolk County, New York

Islip
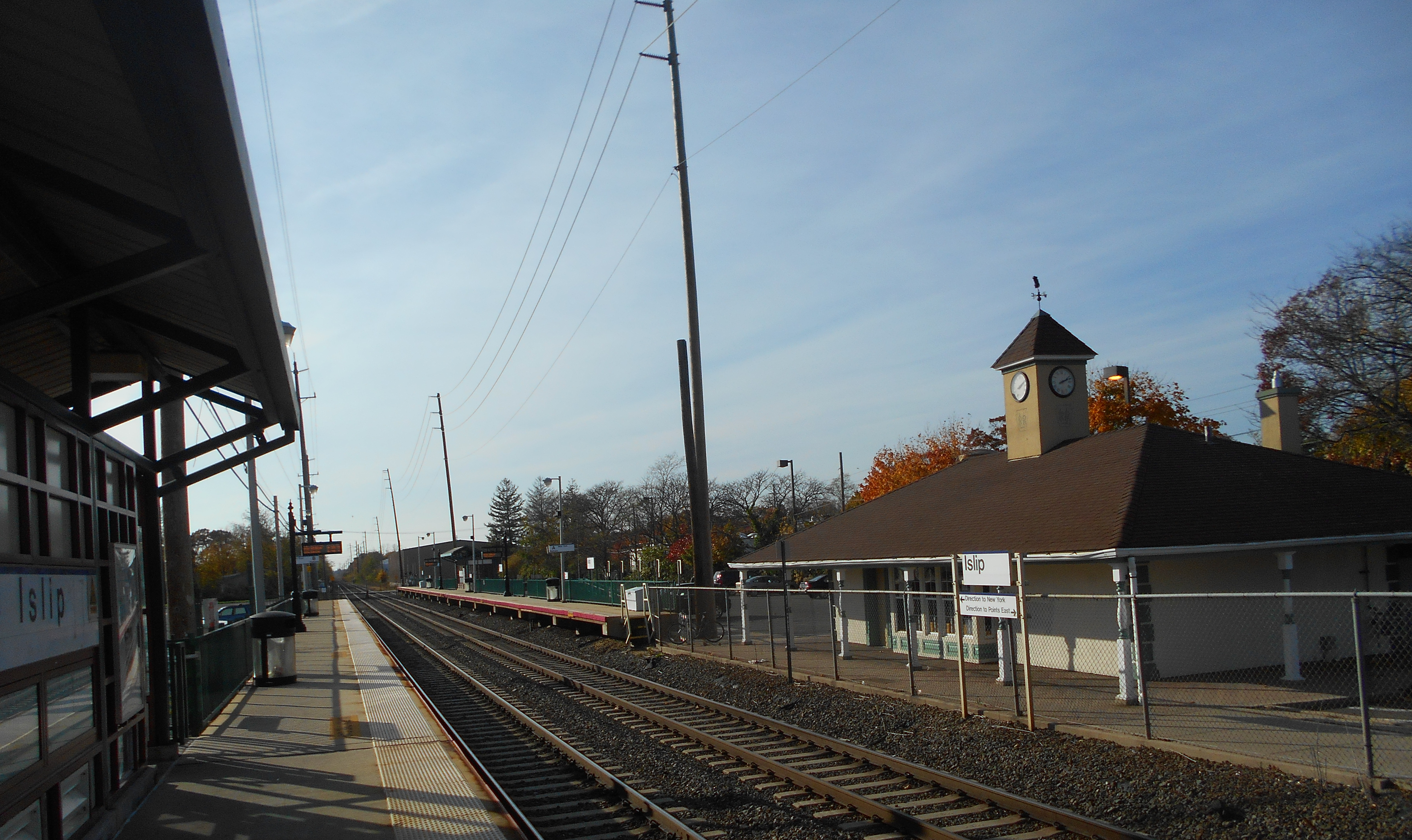
- Islip station house as seen from the eastbound platform

General information
- Location: Islip Avenue (NY 111) & Moffitt Boulevard; Islip, New York
- Coordinates: 40.736°N 73.209°W
- Owner: Long Island Rail Road
- Platforms: 2 side platforms
- Tracks: 2

Construction
- Parking: Yes (free)
- Cycle facilities: Yes (bike rack)
- Accessible: Yes

Other information
- Station code: ISP
- Fare zone: 10

History
- Opened: 1868 (SSRRLI)
- Rebuilt: 1881, 1963, 1997

Passengers
- 2012—2014: 1,028
- Rank: 76 of 125

Services
Preceding station	Long Island Rail Road	Following station
Bay Shore toward Penn Station or Long Island City	Montauk Branch	Great River toward Montauk
Former services
Preceding station	Long Island Rail Road	Following station
Bay Shore toward Long Island City	Montauk Division	Great River toward Montauk
Location

Islip is a station on the Montauk Branch of the Long Island Rail Road, off NY 111 (Islip Avenue) and Nassau Avenue, north of Suffolk CR 50 (Union Boulevard), and south of Moffitt Boulevard in Islip, New York.

== History ==
Islip station was originally built as a South Side Railroad of Long Island depot in 1868. A second depot was built in 1881, then razed in 1963. A third depot was built the same year, and remodeled in 1997. At the west end of the platforms is an at-grade pedestrian crossing with signals but no gates. This crossing is in line with where Williams Avenue used to cross the tracks and intersect with Nassau Avenue. Though the station is neither listed under the National Register of Historic Places nor the New York State Register of Historic Places, it is considered a landmark by the Historical Society of Islip Hamlet.

=== Islip Centre station ===
West of Islip Station, the South Side Railroad of Long Island (SSRRLI), once had an additional station called Islip Centre station. LIRR timetables from 1869 indicate it was at or near Brentwood Road, 1.5 miles east of the Bay Shore station. The station may have been used for members of the Olympic Boat Club. Islip Centre Station was abandoned around May 1870.

== Station layout ==
The station has two offset high-level side platforms each four cars long. The Montauk Branch has two tracks here, though a third abandoned track runs parallel, stopping just a few feet from the north platform. Passengers are able to cross between the tracks using a paved crossing area on the west end of the station. Warning lights and an audible signal alert passengers that a train is nearby, but no gates are present at the crossing area. Passengers cross on the east side using the sidewalk on Islip Avenue.

Ticket machines are located on the north side of the station building.

== Gallery ==
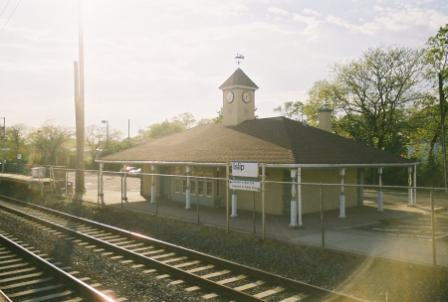
At another angle, you'll find the westbound platform.

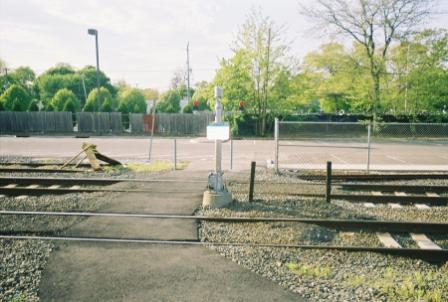
An un-gated pedestrian crossing west of the platforms.

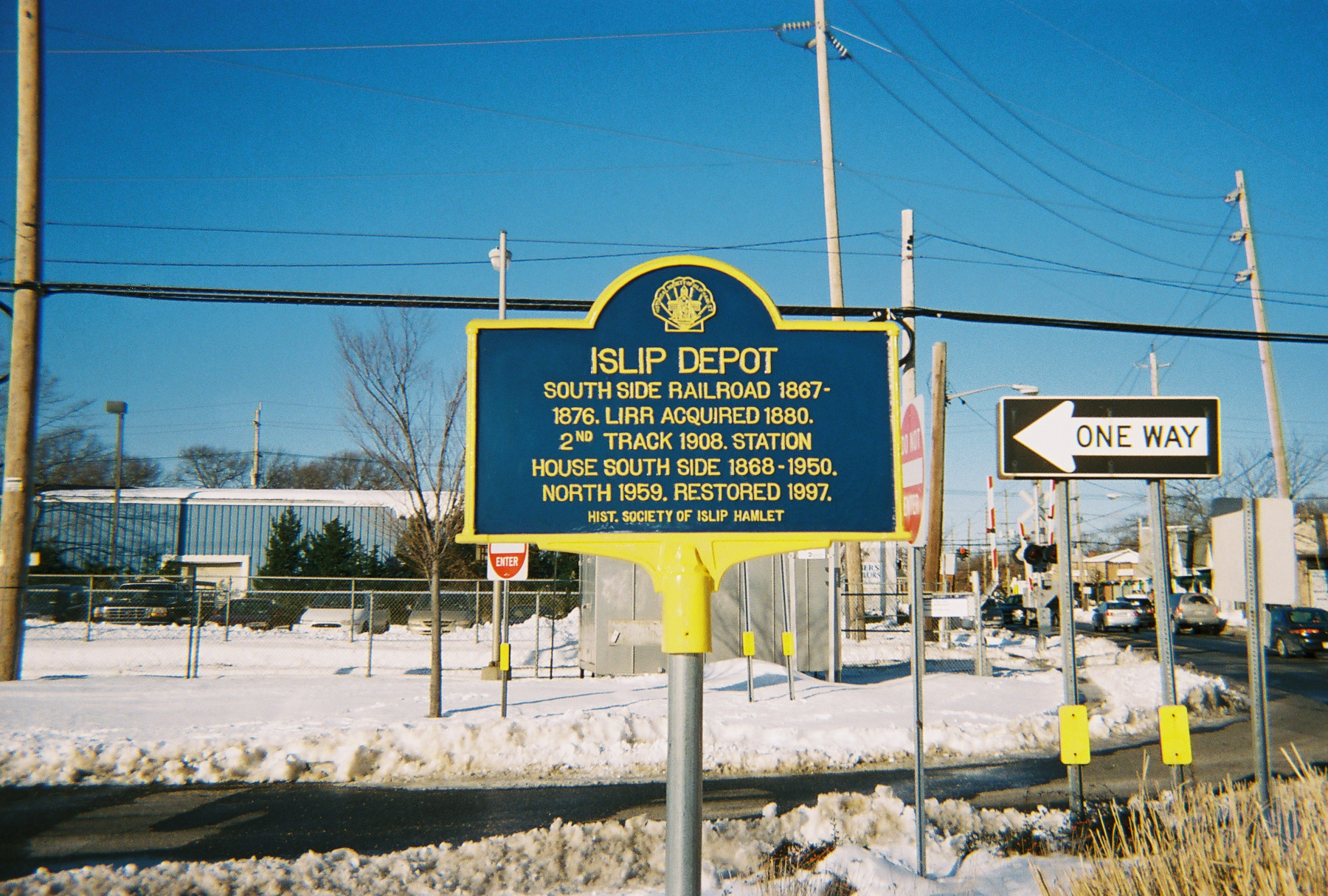
Islip Historic Society's plaque for the station on NY 111.
