= Halesite, New York =

- Hamlet and census-designated place
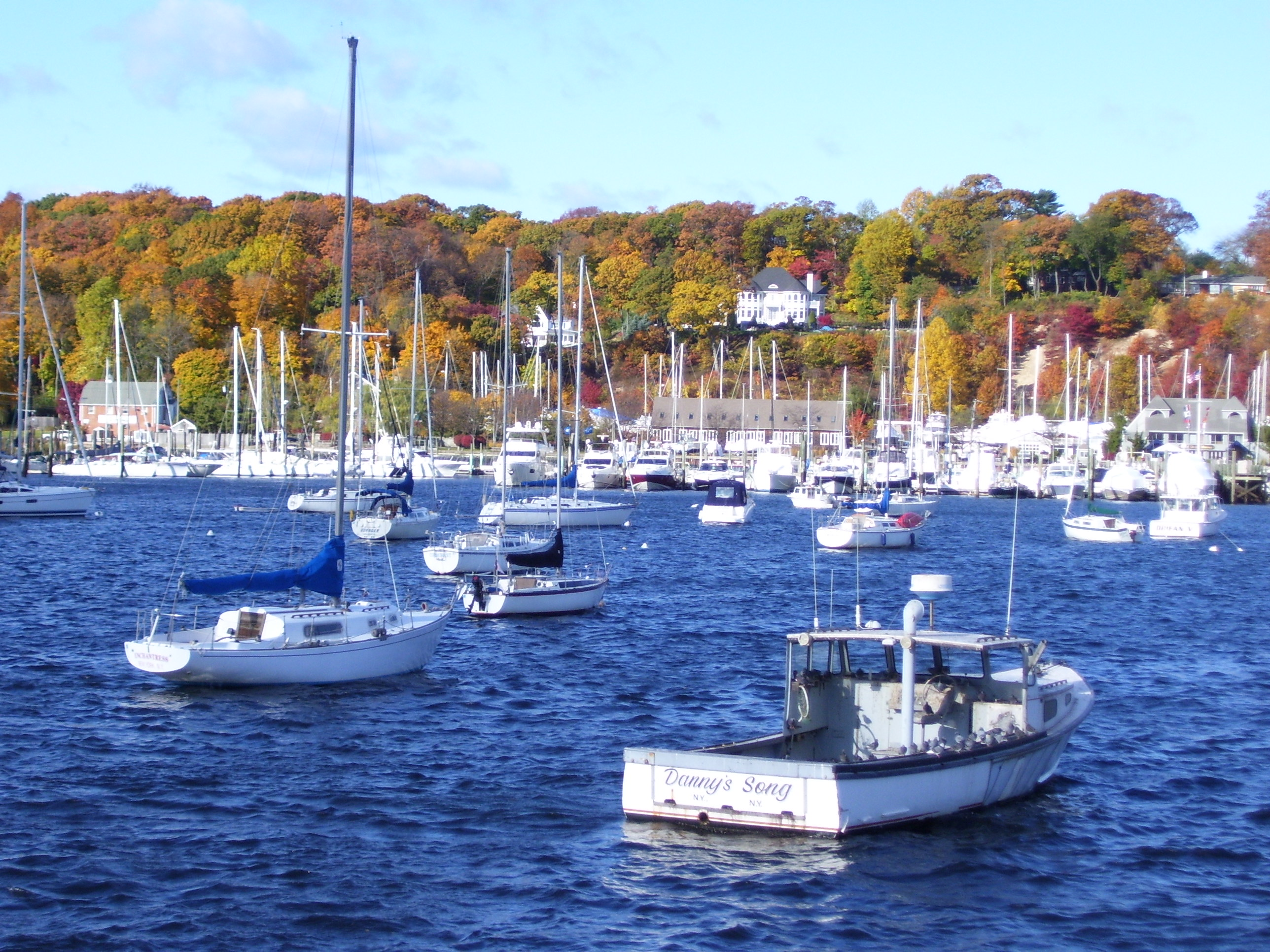
- Huntington Harbor in Halesite in 2007.

- Location on Long Island Location within the state of New York Location within the contiguous United States
- Coordinates: 40°53′10″N 73°24′42″W
- Country: United States
- State: New York
- County: Suffolk
- Town: Huntington

Area
  - Total: 0.98 sq mi (2.55 km^{2})
  - Land: 0.89 sq mi (2.31 km^{2})
  - Water: 0.093 sq mi (0.24 km^{2})
- Elevation: 26 ft (8 m)

Population (2020)
  - Total: 2,527
  - Density: 2,834/sq mi (1,094.4/km^{2})
- Time zone: UTC-5 (Eastern (EST))
  - Summer (DST): UTC-4 (EDT)
- ZIP code: 11743, (11745 historically)
- Area codes: 631, 934
- FIPS code: 36-31445
- GNIS feature ID: 0952018

Halesite is a hamlet and census-designated place (CDP) in the Town of Huntington in Suffolk County, on the North Shore of Long Island, in New York, United States. As of the 2020 census, Halesite had a population of 2,527.

== History ==
Halesite is named after Nathan Hale, a captain and spy in the Continental Army during the American Revolutionary War who arrived at Long Island at Huntington Harbor (at the site now named Halesite) just prior to his capture and execution. There is a rock with a tribute to him off the traffic circle at Mill Dam Road and New York Avenue.

From the mid-19th century until about the time of World War I, Halesite was served by a trolley line which brought passengers from Amityville through Downtown Huntington to the end of New York Avenue, at the northwest end of Halesite. Tourists were able to enjoy Halesite Park, which commands a view of Huntington Harbor.

Well-known persons who spent time or lived in Halesite include comedian/singer Fanny Brice, public servant and businessman George B. Cortelyou, and scientist Albert Einstein.

== Geography ==
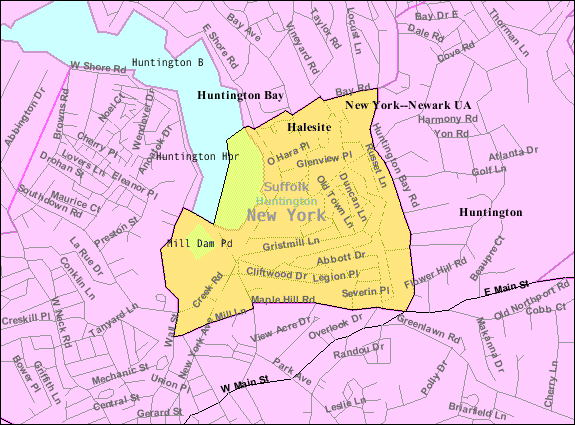
U.S. Census map of Halesite.

According to the United States Census Bureau, the CDP has a total area of 0.97 square miles (2.5 km^{2}), of which 0.89 square miles (2.3 km^{2}) is land and 0.077 square miles (0.2 km^{2}), or 9.41%, is water.

== Demographics ==
Historical population
Census	Pop.	Note	%±
2020	2,527		—
U.S. Decennial Census

=== 2020 census ===
As of the 2020 census, Halesite had a population of 2,527. The median age was 49.5 years. 17.0% of residents were under the age of 18 and 25.5% of residents were 65 years of age or older. For every 100 females there were 95.4 males, and for every 100 females age 18 and over there were 96.5 males age 18 and over.

100.0% of residents lived in urban areas, while 0.0% lived in rural areas.

There were 1,034 households in Halesite, of which 22.9% had children under the age of 18 living in them. Of all households, 55.2% were married-couple households, 15.1% were households with a male householder and no spouse or partner present, and 23.8% were households with a female householder and no spouse or partner present. About 23.1% of all households were made up of individuals and 14.2% had someone living alone who was 65 years of age or older.

There were 1,099 housing units, of which 5.9% were vacant. The homeowner vacancy rate was 1.5% and the rental vacancy rate was 6.4%.

Racial composition as of the 2020 census
Race	Number	Percent
White	2,212	87.5%
Black or African American	43	1.7%
American Indian and Alaska Native	10	0.4%
Asian	61	2.4%
Native Hawaiian and Other Pacific Islander	0	0.0%
Some other race	53	2.1%
Two or more races	148	5.9%
Hispanic or Latino (of any race)	176	7.0%

=== 2000 census ===
As of the census of 2000, there were 2,582 people, 1,014 households, and 707 families residing in the CDP. The population density was 2,991.9 inhabitants per square mile (1,155.2/km^{2}). There were 1,049 housing units at an average density of 1,215.6 per square mile (469.3/km^{2}). The racial makeup of the CDP was 95.27% White, 1.59% African American, 0.08% Native American, 0.93% Asian, 0.04% Pacific Islander, 0.77% from other races, and 1.32% from two or more races. Hispanic or Latino of any race were 3.10% of the population.

There were 1,014 households, out of which 29.7% had children under the age of 18 living with them, 60.1% were married couples living together, 7.0% had a female householder with no husband present, and 30.2% were non-families. 23.8% of all households were made up of individuals, and 7.6% had someone living alone who was 65 years of age or older. The average household size was 2.55 and the average family size was 3.03.

In the CDP, the population was spread out, with 21.2% under the age of 18, 5.7% from 18 to 24, 30.0% from 25 to 44, 30.0% from 45 to 64, and 13.1% who were 65 years of age or older. The median age was 41 years. For every 100 females, there were 98.2 males. For every 100 females age 18 and over, there were 94.5 males.

The median income for a household in the CDP was $96,972, and the median income for a family was $122,842. Males had a median income of $67,438 versus $52,632 for females. The per capita income for the CDP was $46,652. About 1.8% of families and 3.2% of the population were below the poverty line, including 2.4% of those under age 18 and 20.4% of those age 65 or over.

== Institutions ==
The area has been protected by the Halesite Fire Department since 1901. Halesite is also served by a United States Post Office branch, which historically its zip code was (11745). Around the 1980s its zip code was changed to that of the hamlet of Huntington (11743). The United Postal Service still recognizes Halesite as an acceptable mailing alternative. Huntington Hospital sits along the southern boundary of Halesite.

== Landmarks ==
The East Shore Road Historic District is located within the hamlet.
