= Northport station =

Long Island Rail Road station in Suffolk County, New York

Northport
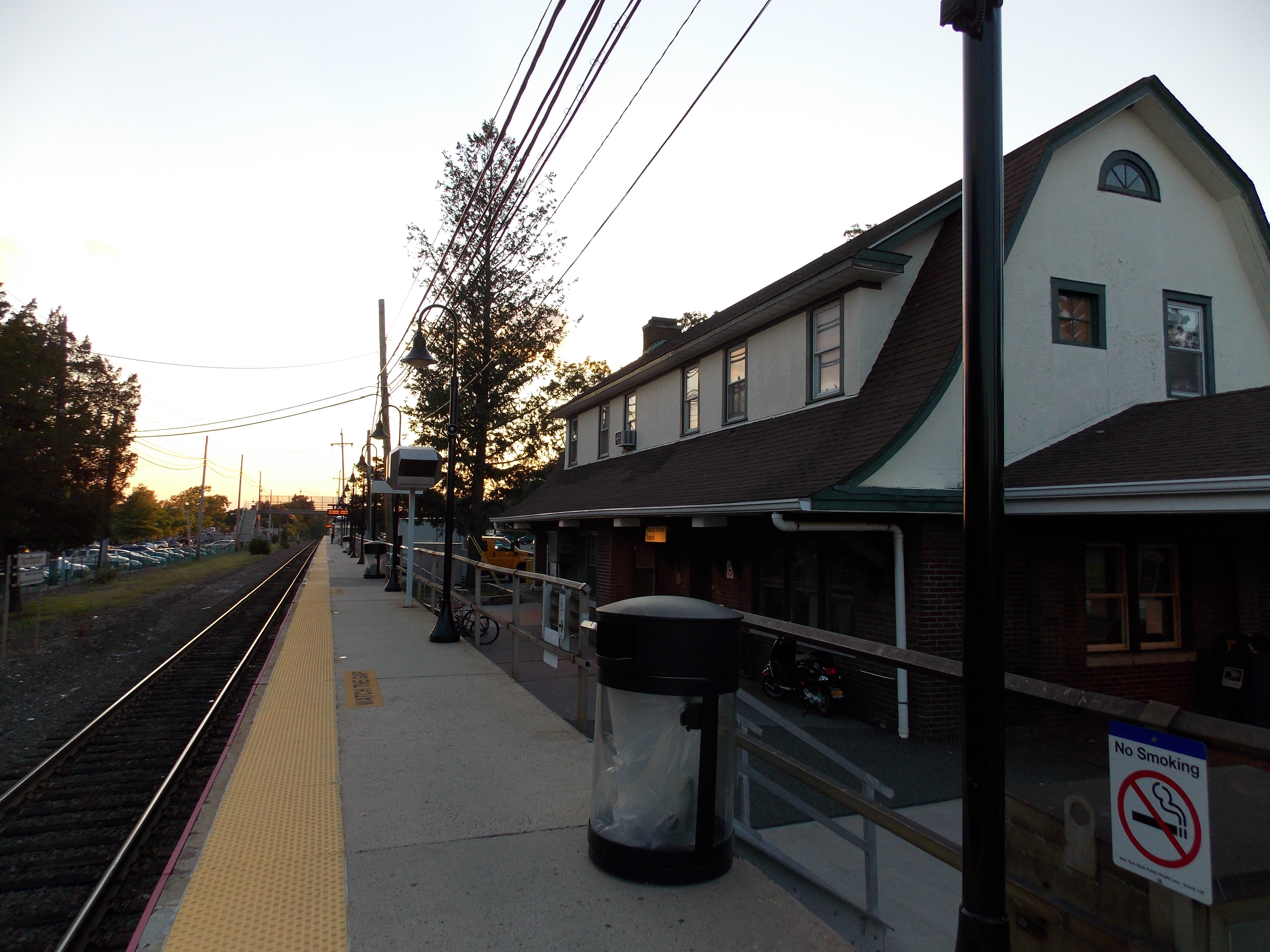
- Northport station in July 2018.

General information
- Location: Larkfield Road and Bellerose Avenue; East Northport, New York
- Coordinates: 40°52′50.57″N 73°19′42.60″W
- Owner: Long Island Rail Road
- Platforms: 1 side platform
- Tracks: 1
- Connections: Suffolk County Transit: 7 Huntington Area Rapid Transit: H40

Construction
- Parking: Yes; Free, Residential permits, Non-Residential permits, Parking meters, Off-Peak parking
- Cycle facilities: Yes
- Accessible: Yes

Other information
- Station code: NPT
- Fare zone: 9

History
- Opened: 1873
- Rebuilt: 1913–1914
- Former names: New Northport (1873–?); Northport East (?–1899)

Passengers
- 2012—2014: 2,335 per weekday

Services
Preceding station	Long Island Rail Road	Following station
Greenlawn toward Penn Station or Long Island City	Port Jefferson Branch diesel service	Kings Park toward Port Jefferson
Former services
Preceding station	Long Island Rail Road	Following station
Greenlawn toward Hicksville	Wading River Branch	Kings Park toward Wading River
Location

Northport is a station on the Port Jefferson Branch of the Long Island Rail Road. It is located at the corner of Larkfield Road and Bellerose Avenue, north of Suffolk CR 11 (Pulaski Road) in East Northport, Suffolk County, New York.

== History ==
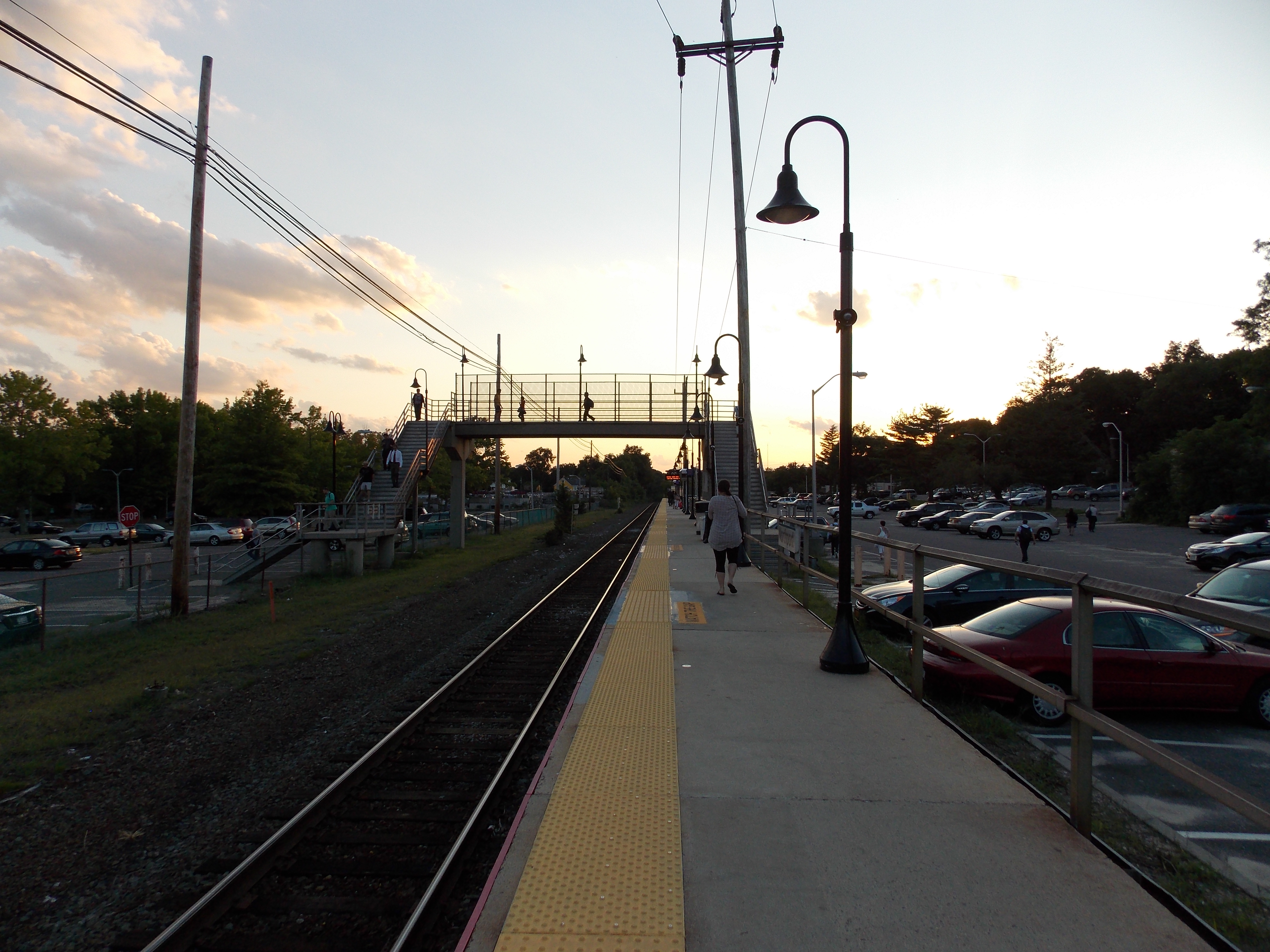
View of the overpass and location of the unbuilt second platform

Northport station was originally built between May and July 1873 as "New Northport" station when the Smithtown and Port Jefferson Railroad was built from Northport Junction to Port Jefferson, New York. The original line, which led directly into a station within Northport Village since April 25, 1868, became the Northport Branch. During that period, the original Northport station was renamed Old Northport station, while at some point in or before 1899, "New" Northport station was renamed "Northport East" station. Passenger service ended in 1899. Freight service continued until 1985, when the branch was abandoned.

It was designed in a manner similar to stations such as those in Riverhead, Bay Shore, Manhasset, and Mineola. It also served as the south end of a trolley Line into Northport from 1902 to 1924. A freight house from Camp Upton was moved to Northport station in April 1922, after the railroad station there was dismantled. A high-level platform and a pedestrian bridge were added during the late 20th century. Northport station features two large parking lots; the larger lot is adjacent to the platform and the smaller lot is on the opposite side of the track. The pedestrian bridge connects the lots, and is wide enough to accommodate a second track and second platform.

The current station is just east of the Northport Spur, which branched off the main and headed north to the seaport village of Northport, even though the Northport station is in East Northport. Passenger service on the spur ended in 1899, after which the spur was used entirely for freight service, until that also ended in 1978. The track lay abandoned until 1985, when it was torn up in preparation for the unbuilt Babylon–Northport Expressway.

In 2018, the LIRR completed an extensive rehabilitation of the station building, installing brick-paver walkways, new windows, a renovated waiting room, and new signage. A project to replace and upgrade the station platform began in spring 2022 and is expected to be completed in the third quarter of 2023. The reconstructed platform will be heated and capable of melting snow and ice in the winter. As of mid-2023, the western half of the renovated platform was mostly complete, and reconstruction of the eastern half had begun.

== Station layout ==
This station has one 12-car-long high-level side platform to the north of the track. East of the station, on the other side of Larkfield Road, is a siding to allow trains to pass each other. The siding converges at DUKE interlocking and the two switches are maintained by two light signals next to them.

A second platform, for an extension of the siding or a full second track, was originally planned for the station. The pedestrian bridge is wide enough for this extra construction, and the bridge's stairway on the far side of the station has a landing on the same level as the unbuilt outbound platform, symmetrical with the landing on the other side which is part of the existing platform. A ticket window was proposed to be established but it has yet to occur.

== Gallery ==
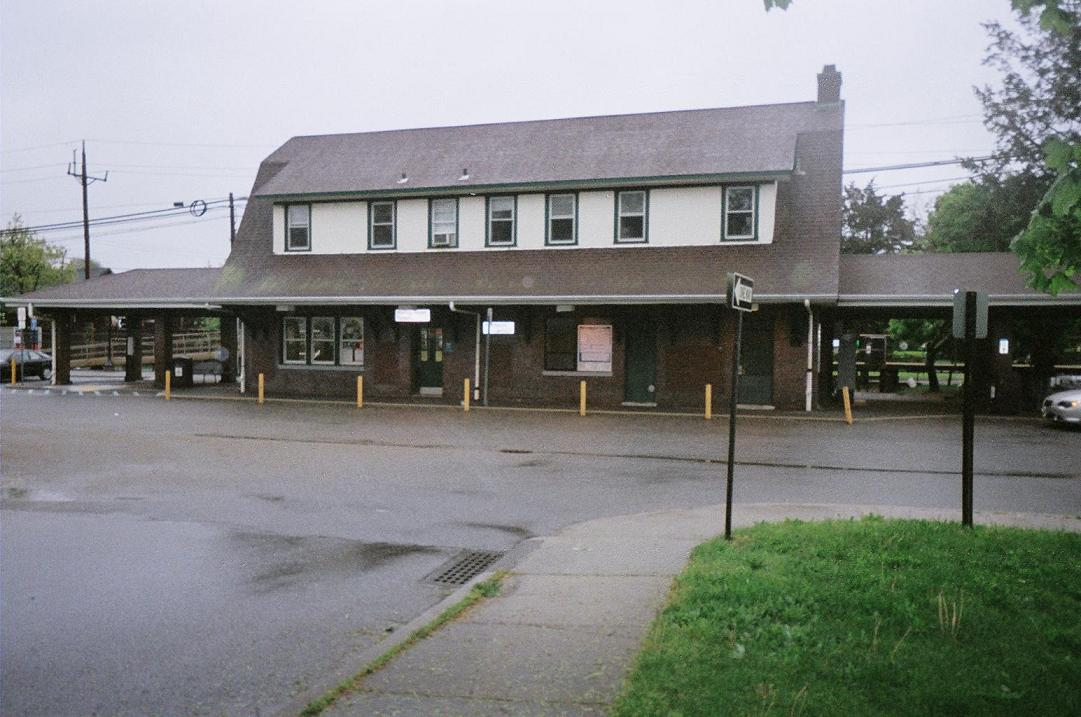
View of the Northport station house.

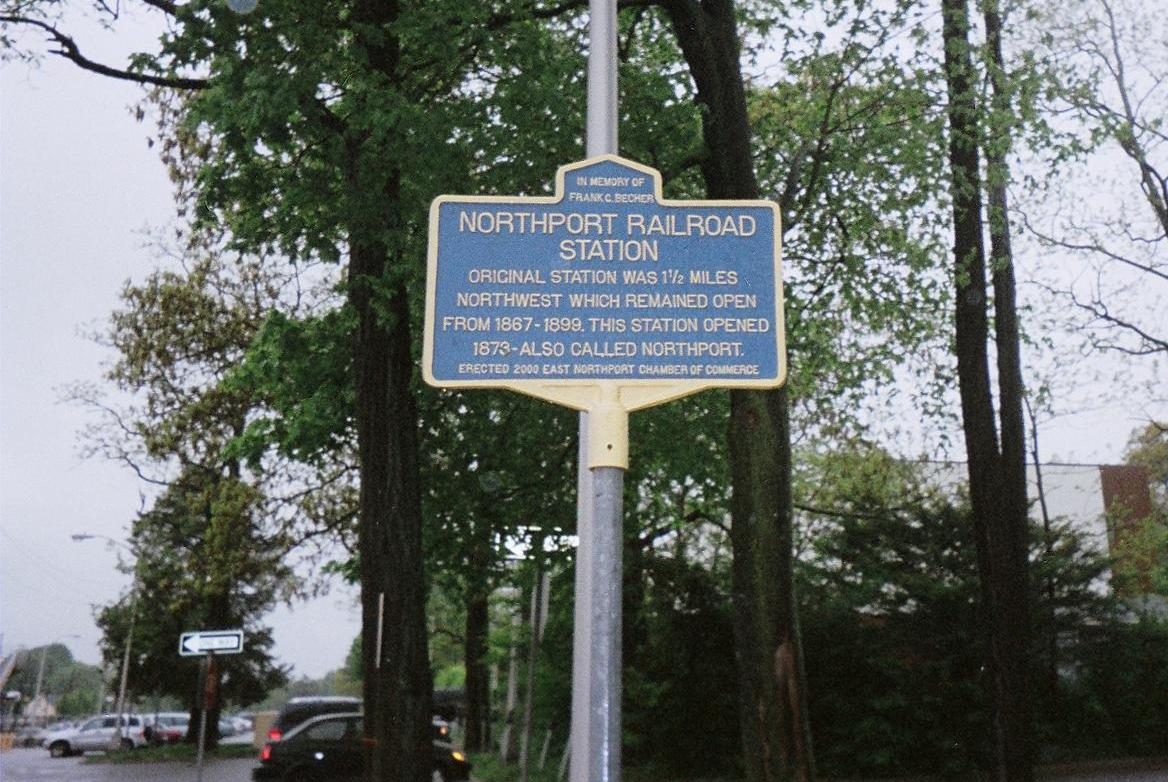
Historic marker, placed by the Chamber of Commerce in 2000.

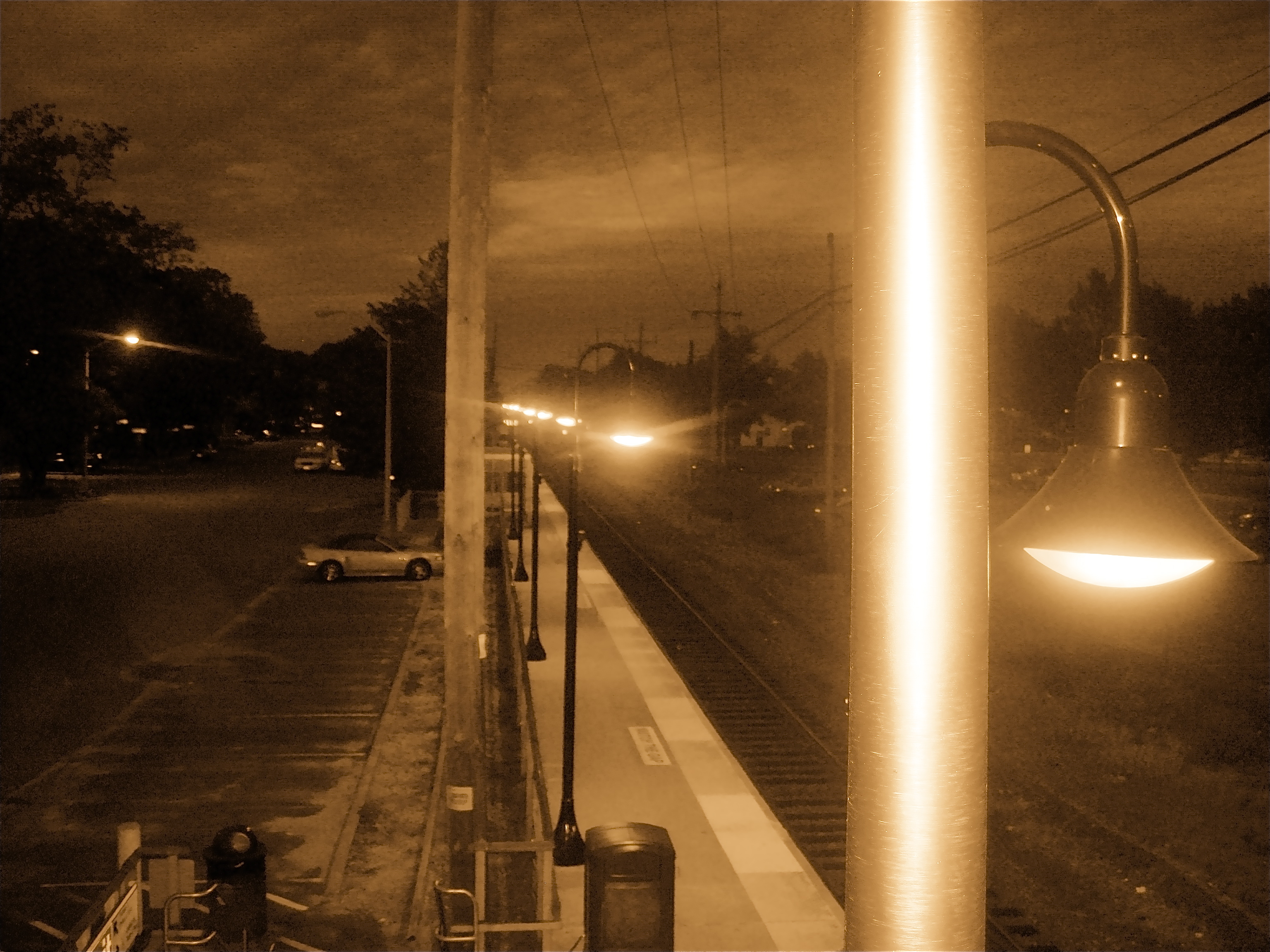
Picture taken of the platform from the pedestrian bridge at night.
