= Northport Branch =

Former Long Island Rail Road branch

Overview
- Status: Abandoned
- Locale: Town of Huntington, New York
- Termini: Northport Junction (west); Northport (east)
- Stations: 1

Service
- Type: Passenger and Freight (1868-1899); Freight only (1899-1978)
- Operator(s): Long Island Rail Road

History
- Opened: April 15, 1868
- Closed: 1978

Technical
- Track gauge: 1,435 mm (4 ft 8 1/2 in)

The Northport Branch was a spur off the Port Jefferson Branch of the Long Island Rail Road, running from between Greenlawn and Northport stations to directly within Northport Village.

Northport became the terminus of an extension of the Hicksville and Syosset Railroad line (later the Hicksville and Cold Spring Branch Railroad), after some arguments with Oliver Charlick over the locations of stations in Cold Spring Harbor, and Huntington led to the line bypassing both towns, the latter of them two miles to the south, though a station was built for both of them. The line was extended from Syosset past Huntington to Northport in 1868, and in 1873 the Smithtown and Port Jefferson Railroad opened from a mile south of Northport to Port Jefferson, turning the old line into Northport into the Northport Branch, the result of another argument between Charlick and Northport.

Old Northport Station was abandoned in 1899, but the Northport Branch was used as a freight line throughout much of the 20th century. The spur was refurbished in the mid-1970s to prevent the loss of a local lumber firm, which had planned to move to New Jersey when the Metropolitan Transportation Authority previously announced it would abandon the line. Between the 1950s and early-1980s, the New York State Department of Transportation wanted to use part of the branch for construction of the Babylon-Northport Expressway. Opponents of the expressway assumed that the NYSDOT was using the expressway as a plot against the railroad. In reality, the industries that previously used the line no longer found it useful, and it was abandoned in 1978, and dismantled in 1985.

In 1987, the Long Island Rail Road leased the segment of the former right-of-way from Elwood Road to Route 25A to a group of local developers that sought approval to build a car wash on the site. Construction of the car wash began in 1994 and the facility opened the following year. In 2007, a license agreement was made between the Town of Huntington and the Metropolitan Transportation Authority to convert the 0.65-mile-long (1.05 km) segment of the former right-of-way between Laurel Hill Road and Elwood Road into a rail trail. The size of the 4.4-acre (18,000 m^{2}) greenway was nearly doubled two years later with the addition of 4 acres (16,000 m^{2}) of parkland from an adjacent undeveloped parcel that had been acquired by New York State through eminent domain for the proposed Babylon-Northport Expressway, which had been canceled in 1982. The side-by-side properties were named the Northport Rail Trail Park.

== Stations ==
Station	Miles (km) from Penn Station	Date opened	Date closed	Connections / notes
For continuing service to Hicksville and points west, see Port Jefferson Branch
Greenlawn	39.2 (63.1)	c. 1868		HART Bus: H30 Originally Centerport
Port Jefferson Branch diverges at Northport Junction
Northport Village		April 15, 1868	October 17, 1899	Originally Northport; Renamed Northport Village or Old Northport in 1873.
The entire line was converted to freight only in 1899, abandoned 1978, and dismantled in 1985
