= Patchogue station =

Long Island Rail Road station in Suffolk County, New York

Patchogue
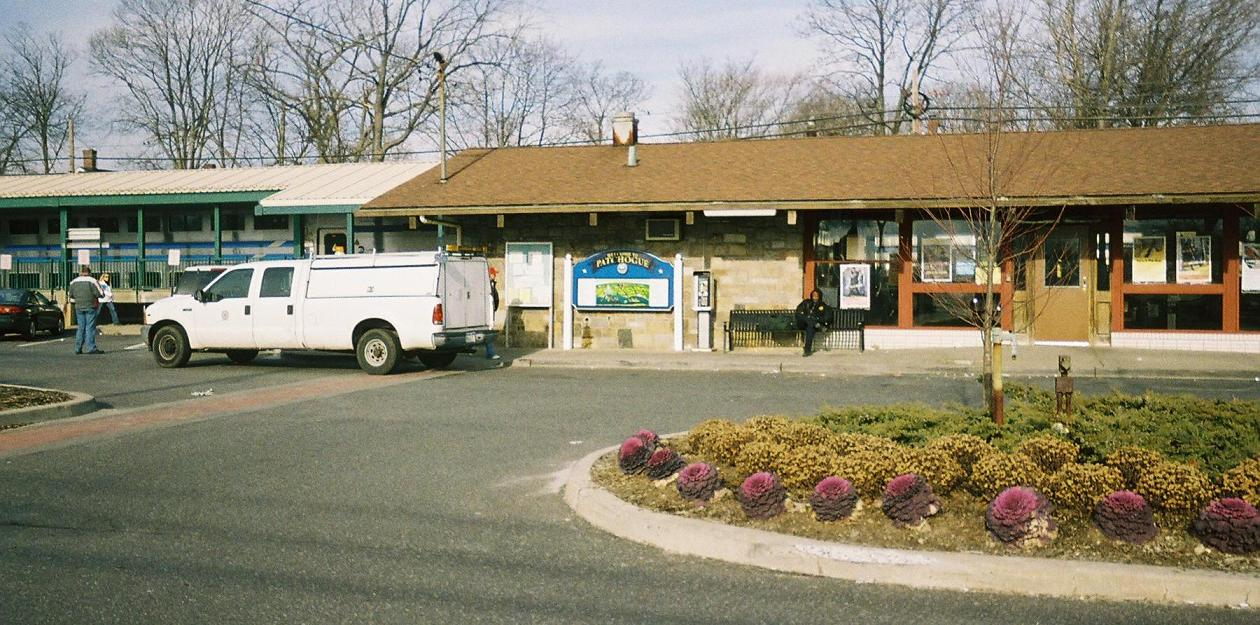
- Patchogue station from the entrance at Division Street & Cedar Avenue; December 26, 2007

General information
- Location: Division Street & South Ocean Avenue; Patchogue, New York
- Coordinates: 40.761841°N 73.015735°W
- Owner: Long Island Rail Road
- Platforms: 1 side platform
- Tracks: 2
- Connections: Suffolk County Transit: 2, 6, 51, 53, 55, 66, South Country On Demand; Davis Park Ferry Co.: Davis Park Ferry (seasonal); Watch Hill Ferry (all times)

Construction
- Parking: Yes ($2.00 for 12 hours)
- Cycle facilities: Yes
- Accessible: Yes

Other information
- Station code: PGE
- Fare zone: 10

History
- Opened: April 1869 (SSRRLI)
- Rebuilt: 1888, 1963, 1997

Passengers
- 2012—2014: 1,191 per weekday
- Rank: 71 of 125

Services
Preceding station	Long Island Rail Road	Following station
Sayville toward Penn Station or Long Island City	Montauk Branch	Bellport limited service toward Montauk
Former services
Preceding station	Long Island Rail Road	Following station
Blue Point toward Long Island City	Montauk Division	East Patchogue toward Montauk
Location

Patchogue (signed as Patchogue Fire Island Ferries) is a station of the Montauk Branch of the Long Island Rail Road in the Village of Patchogue, Suffolk County, New York. It is on Division Street between West Avenue (CR 19) and South Ocean Avenue. The station is the eastern terminus for some trains on the branch.

Ferries to Fire Island board from a port near the station.

== History ==
Between 1869 and 1879 Patchogue station was the east end of the South Side Railroad of Long Island. It even had spurs and roundhouses between West and Railroad Avenues, as well as another spur between River Avenue and West Avenue for the textile plant that more recently has served as the former Patchogue Campus of Briarcliffe College. Prior to acquisition by the Long Island Rail Road there was a proposal by the SSRRLI to extend the main line southeast towards Bellport, then northeast to Brookhaven and Southaven. The station in Brookhaven was to be named "Fireplace" after Fireplace Neck.

The station was rebuilt in 1889 and again on July 30, 1963. As part of the 1963 reconstruction, Railroad Avenue was terminated at Sephton Street, along the north side of the tracks, and the baggage and express house was torn down for additional parking. When the nearby Blue Point station was closed by the Long Island Rail Road in 1980, former Blue Point commuters opted to use Patchogue station.

A high-level platform was constructed at the station in the late 1990s, in order to serve the LIRR's then-new C3 bilevel railcars, which require high-level platforms. The renovations also made the station compliant with the Americans with Disabilities Act of 1990.

== Station layout ==
The station has one high-level platform – long enough to accommodate six cars – and two tracks. The platform is located on the south side of the two tracks; the north track – not next to the platform – is a siding track.

== PD Tower ==
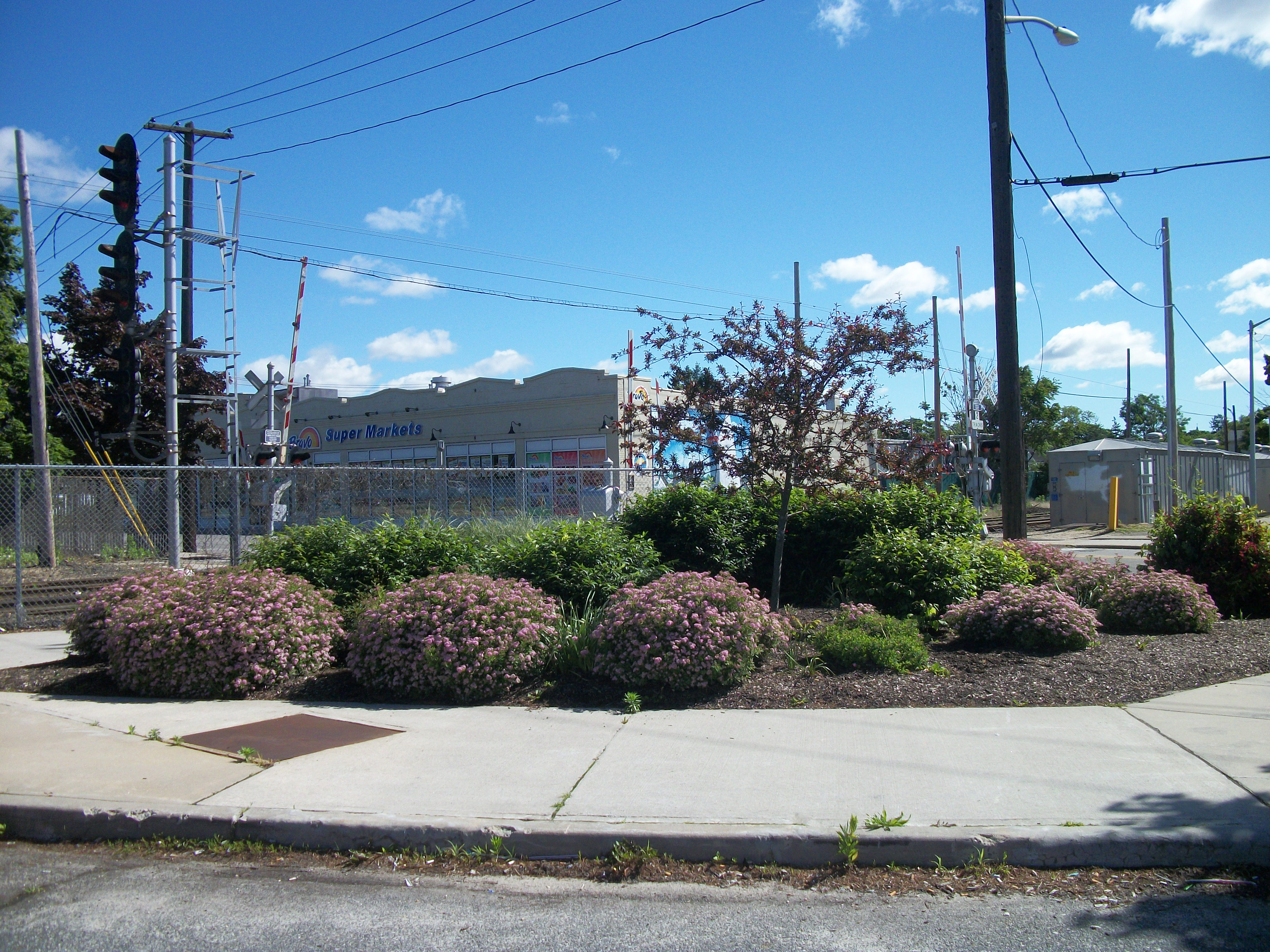
The flower garden located where PD Tower once stood

PD Tower was a former Long Island Rail Road control tower, located on South Ocean Avenue in the Village of Patchogue, in Suffolk County, New York, United States.

=== History ===
In 1912, the Long Island Rail Road added a control tower to the Patchogue station on South Ocean Avenue, for use by both the Montauk Branch and the former trolley line owned by the Suffolk Traction Company. This control tower was designated by the LIRR as the "PD Tower" and was also used for hooping.

In 1970, all switches and crossings once controlled by the tower were automated, but hooping continued. At this point, the tower's structure began to decline and deteriorate. Residents began referring to it as the "Leaning Tower of Patchogue," and it ultimately fell into a state of disrepair.

On August 23, 2006, PD Tower was ultimately torn down, having become structurally unsound.

Following the demolition of PD Tower, the land on which it stood was repurposed, being transformed into a flower garden.

== Connections ==
- Suffolk County Transit buses 2, 6, 51, 53, 55, 66, 77, and 77Y (77Y runs on weekday rush hours only).
- Davis Park Ferry Co. ferries to Davis Park and Watch Hill on Fire Island (at the Patchogue Davis Park Ferry Terminal and Patchogue Watch Hill Ferry Terminal, respectively).

== See also ==
- History of the Long Island Rail Road
- List of Long Island Rail Road stations
