= Sayville station =

Long Island Rail Road station in Suffolk County, New York

Sayville
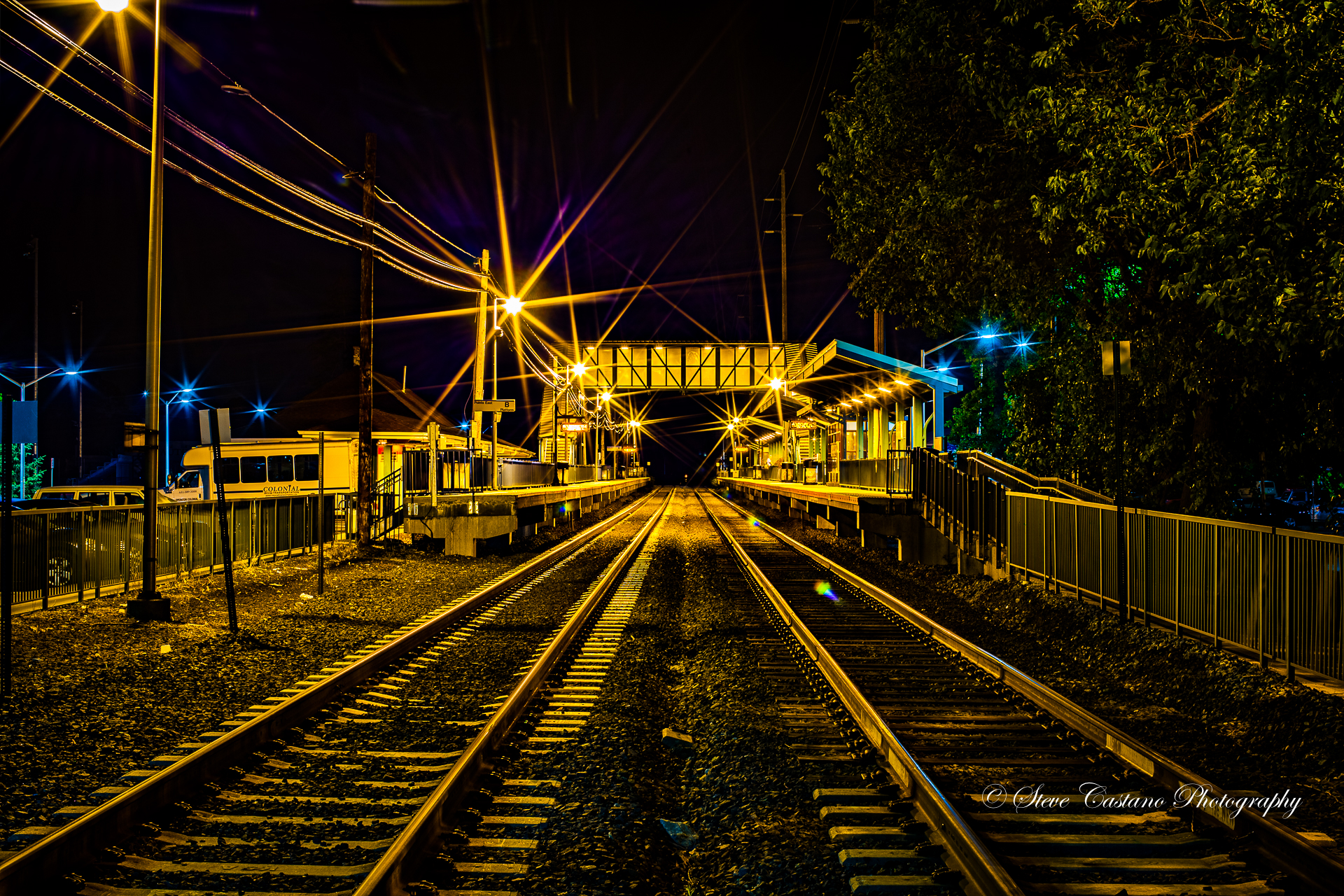
- The Sayville station, as seen from the Lakeland Avenue grade crossing in 2017

General information
- Location: Depot Street & Greeley Avenue; Sayville, New York
- Coordinates: 40.740388°N 73.086497°W
- Owner: Long Island Rail Road
- Platforms: 2 side platforms
- Tracks: 2

Construction
- Parking: Yes (free)
- Cycle facilities: Yes
- Accessible: yes

Other information
- Station code: SVL
- Fare zone: 10

History
- Opened: 1868 (SSRRLI)
- Rebuilt: 1906, 1999

Passengers
- 2012—2014: 1,078 per weekday
- Rank: 75 of 125

Services
Preceding station	Long Island Rail Road	Following station
Oakdale toward Penn Station or Long Island City	Montauk Branch	Patchogue toward Montauk
Former services
Preceding station	Long Island Rail Road	Following station
Oakdale toward Long Island City	Montauk Division	Bayport toward Montauk
Location

Sayville (signed as Sayville Fire Island Ferries) is a station on the Montauk Branch of the Long Island Rail Road in the hamlet of Sayville, New York, on Depot Street between Greeley Avenue and Railroad Avenue. Ferries to Fire Island board from a nearby port located to the station's south.

== History ==
Sayville station was originally built by the South Side Railroad of Long Island in December 1868, and was the end of the line until April 1869 when the line was extended to Patchogue. From that point until the early 20th century, the station also served as the local post office. At the time, it contained coal sidings, spurs into lumber yards, a freight house west of Greeley Avenue, a dairy farm, and a horse trolley to the Great South Bay owned by the South Shore Traction Company.

The original station was razed sometime in 1906 and a second depot opened on August 3 that year. When Bayport station was closed by the Long Island Rail Road in 1980, former Bayport commuters opted to use Sayville station.

A renovation project in 1998–1999 installed a pedestrian overpass and sheltered high-level platforms.

== Station layout ==
The station has two high-level side platforms each eight cars long. The Montauk Branch has two tracks here, the last such station on the line; all stations from Patchogue east to Montauk have only a single platform, as the double track becomes single track between Sayville and the former Bayport station.
