= Manhattan and Queens Traction Company =

Former New York City street railway company (1913–1937)

Overview
- Locale: Manhattan, Long Island City, Jamaica, and vicinity.

Service
- Type: Streetcar

History
- Opened: 1912
- Closed: 1937

Technical
- Track gauge: 4 ft 8 1/2 in (1,435 mm)
- Minimum radius: (?)

The Manhattan and Queens Traction Company, also known as the Manhattan and Queens Transit Company, was a streetcar company operating in Manhattan and Queens County, New York between 1913 and 1937.

== History ==
The Manhattan and Queens Traction Company was originally part of the South Shore Traction Company based in Sayville, New York. The company was established in 1903 as a horsecar service, and built two lines; both of which began at Sayville Railroad Station. One line ran from Railroad Avenue down to Montauk Highway and then to Candee Road towards the Great South Bay. The other ran from the station to Middle Road through Bayport then turned north Oakwood Avenue, then east along the south side of the Long Island Rail Road Montauk Branch onto Railroad Street which served Bayport LIRR Station. Railroad Street becomes Maple Street in Blue Point, and the trolley that ran along it turned north onto Blue Point Avenue where it momentarily connected to Blue Point station before reaching Montauk Highway.

Their original plans were far more ambitious. Besides a line running east into Patchogue, they were proposing a cross island trolley line, which was intended to run north through Bohemia, Lake Ronkonkoma, Saint James, Stony Brook, Setauket, East Setauket, and finally Port Jefferson. Beyond that it also planned to build lines through Nassau and Queens Counties, as part of their charter to connect to all the lines on Long Island, mostly along the South Shore. As part of the effort to do so, it acquired and operated a line across the Queensboro Bridge from Manhattan to Long Island City. However, it was unable to break through the monopoly of the LIRR-held lines in Nassau County such as the New York and Long Island Traction Company, as well as local litigation. The railroad sold off its original two lines to the Suffolk Traction Company, and moved to Long Island City in 1912, re-chartering themselves as the Manhattan and Queens Transportation Company.

The main line of the M&QT was that line along the Queensboro Bridge, but it was expanded into Woodside, Elmhurst, Forest Hills, and finally Jamaica by 1914. The terminus in Jamaica was largely due to trackage rights with the Brooklyn Rapid Transit subsidiary known as the Brooklyn, Queens County and Suburban Railroad. This was officially known as the Queens Boulevard Line. Other than this, it contained a short industrial track along Van Dam Street in Long Island City, and a slight extension south of Jamaica Station that was to be part of a never-completed southern extension. The last trolleys of the M&QT ran in 1937. The company converted itself into the Manhattan and Queens Bus Corporation, running the line as the Q60 bus and was bought out by Green Bus Lines in 1943.
