= Suffolk Traction Company =

Streetcar system in Suffolk County, New York

Overview
- Owner: Patchogue Electric Light Company
- Locale: Sayville, Patchogue, Holtsville, and vicinity.

Service
- Type: Horsecar, then Streetcar

History
- Opened: 1909
- Closed: 1919

Technical
- Track gauge: 4 ft 8 1/2 in (1,435 mm)
- Minimum radius: (?)
- Electrification: Batteries

The Suffolk Traction Company is a former streetcar system in Suffolk County, New York. It operated primarily between Patchogue and Holtsville, but also included a route that served Blue Point, Bayport, and Sayville. It was opened in 1909 and ceased operations in 1919.

== Main Line ==
The four current roads that originally carried the trolley line between Patchogue and Holtsville are South Ocean Avenue, North Ocean Avenue, and what today is Old North Ocean Avenue. The PD Tower at Patchogue Railroad Station served as a control tower for both the Long Island Railroad and the trolleys. Traction Boulevard (also known as Suffolk Traction Boulevard) continued the line, which crossed over the southeast corner of Canaan Lake and headed in a northwesterly direction. North of the Patchogue Highlands area, the paved road became a dirt trail and carried the former ROW towards Holtsville Station. The trolleys that used the road were storage battery cars that ran down the center of the street.

North of Holtsville, Suffolk Traction planned an extension through Farmingville, Selden, Terryville, Echo (now Port Jefferson Station), and eventually Port Jefferson. However, the company went bankrupt, even as a bridge was being built over the LIRR Main Line for the Suffolk Traction Main Line on the way to Port Jefferson.

The ROW was abandoned, and much of it was sold to private and public developers later in the 20th century, although the road was still depicted on numerous maps. The dirt trail was visible where it crossed Woodside Avenue and then disappeared entirely at the latter-day site of the town dump where it was obliterated (see below). It picked up again in the woods on the east side of Waverly Avenue just south of Katz's Farm which was located directly south of the LIRR station in Holtsville. The ROW ran along the edge of Katz's Farm so was not discernible.

The Town of Brookhaven installed a landfill on part of the former ROW, leaving a portion of it as an entrance at Blue Point Road. The landfill was transformed into a town park in the early to mid-1970s. During a 2009 repaving project of North Ocean Avenue by the Village of Patchogue Department of Public Works, the former trolley tracks were uncovered and removed for preservation.

== Other branches ==
Besides the main line, Suffolk Traction Company had the Bayport-Blue Point Line between Sayville Railroad Station and Patchogue at Bicycle Path, a section of which is currently NY 112. The line was originally owned by the South Shore Traction Company and ran primarily along Middle Road, Blue Point Avenue, and Montauk Highway. It served the LIRR stations in Sayville, Bayport, Blue Point and Patchogue. A proposed eastbound extension into Bellport and Brookhaven was also on the books, but collapsed along with the Port Jefferson extension of the main line.

A third line called the Sayville Line ran exclusively within Sayville, from the Railroad Station along Sayville's Railroad Avenue, Montauk Highway, and Candee Avenue down to the Great South Bay. This line was originally a horse-drawn trolley, and like the Sayville to Patchogue Line, it was originally owned by the South Shore Traction Company.
