= Wantagh station =

Long Island Rail Road station in New York, US

Wantagh
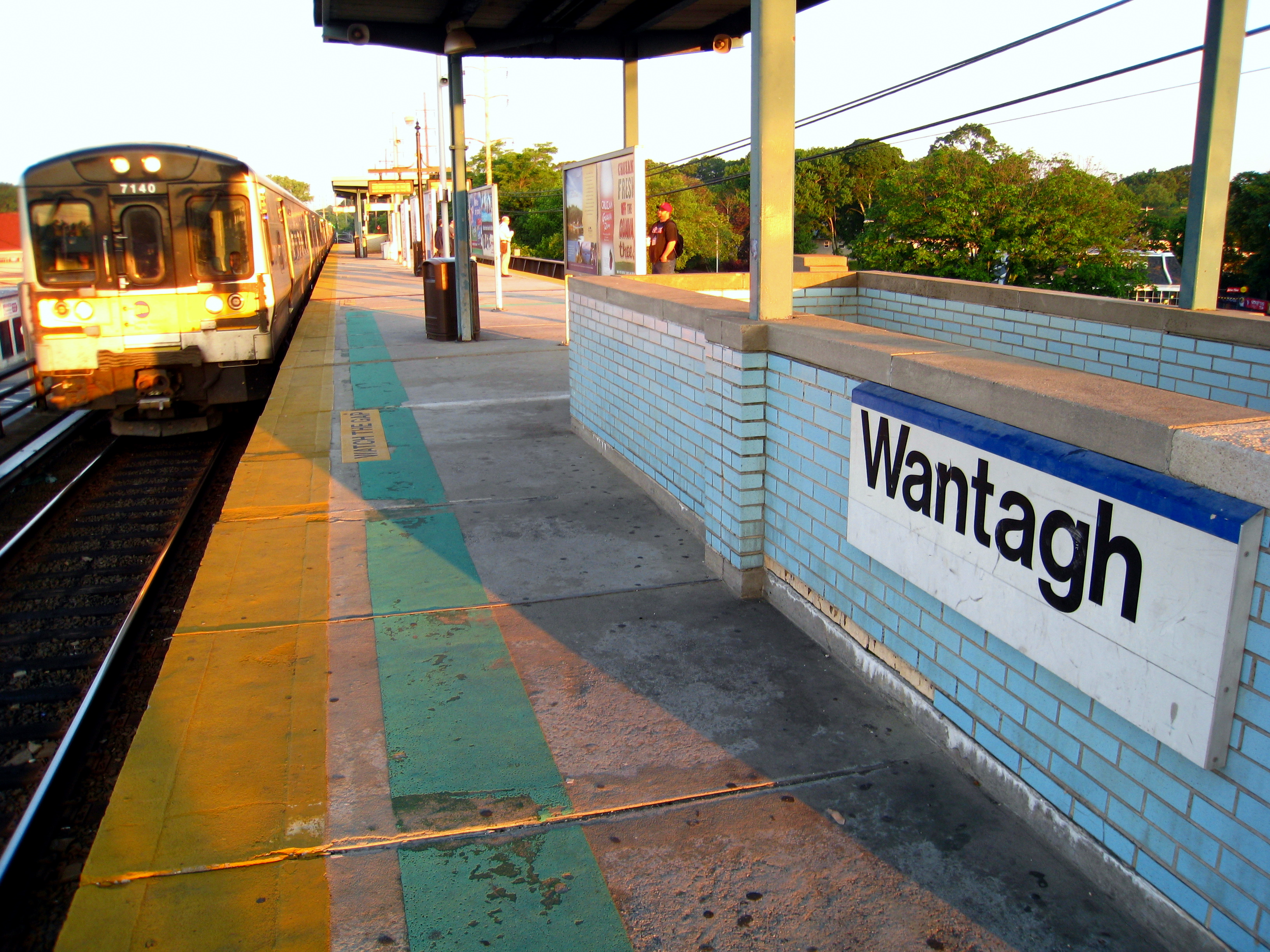
- South track at Wantagh station as an eastbound M7 train arrives

General information
- Location: Wantagh & Railroad Avenues; Wantagh, New York
- Coordinates: 40.672937°N 73.509098°W
- Owner: Long Island Rail Road
- Line: Montauk Branch
- Distance: 25.9 mi (41.7 km) from Long Island City
- Platforms: 1 island platform
- Tracks: 2
- Connections: Nassau Inter-County Express: n19 (at Merrick Road)

Construction
- Parking: Yes
- Cycle facilities: Yes
- Accessible: Yes

Other information
- Station code: WGH
- Fare zone: 7

History
- Opened: 1867; 159 years ago (SSRRLI)
- Rebuilt: 1885, 1966–1967, 2016-2018
- Electrified: May 20, 1925; 750 V (DC) third rail
- Former names: Ridgewood (1867–1891)

Passengers
- 2012–2014: 4,376 per weekday
- Rank: 20 of 125

Services
Preceding station	Long Island Rail Road	Following station
Bellmore toward Penn Station, Grand Central or Atlantic Terminal	Babylon Branch	Seaford toward Babylon
Montauk Branch does not stop here
Former services
Preceding station	Long Island Rail Road	Following station
Bellmore toward Long Island City	Montauk Division	Seaford toward Montauk
Location

Wantagh is a station on the Babylon Branch of the Long Island Rail Road. It is located on Wantagh Avenue and Railroad Avenue near NY 27 (Sunrise Highway) in Wantagh, New York. It is used as a terminal and origin for some Babylon branch trains during the rush hours.

== History ==
Wantagh was originally named Ridgewood and was built as a South Side Railroad of Long Island depot between 1867 and 1875. The station was replaced in 1885 and renamed "Wantagh" in 1891. Like so many stations along the Babylon-Montauk Branch, the original grade-level station was decommissioned when the current elevated stationed opened on October 22, 1968, after construction from 1966 to 1968. The elevated station opened the same day as Seaford and were identical in design. The former station was restored as part of the Wantagh Museum in 1969 and added to the National Register of Historic Places in 1983. It was one of many that were elevated throughout Nassau and Western Suffolk counties from the 1950s continuing through the 1970s.

Following the completion of Massapequa's renovation, Wantagh is set to receive a full renovation very similar to what was done at Seaford in 2009. Plans include demolishing and rebuilding the platform, replacing escalators, staircases, lighting, canopies, and waiting areas in addition to adding an elevator, making that station wheelchair accessible. The platform replaced was the original 1968 platform that was constructed when Wantagh was grade separated. The official project of renovating the station started in late June 2016 and was completed in October 2018.

On February 26, 2018 the first phase of the project was completed with the Eastern half rehabilitated. This included the elevator in service, a heated waiting room, a heating system underneath the platform to melt snow, and the two Eastern staircases back in service. It was completed nine months behind schedule, and complaints from commuters poured in. During the winter time when they were putting in the ASIM (Automated Snow and Ice Melt) system, the temperatures were in the teens for a few weeks causing the pipes to burst from being frozen. The condition of the new platform was described as haphazardly and shoddy with noticeable concrete patches near the platform edge, and the elevator breaking down three times. Phase II or Western half of the platform started a week later and was completed in early-October 2018, completing the stations rehabilitation project, including further rehabilitation to the station's Eastern half to correct the repairs and seal both halves together. The results of the project include a new elevator, making it the first time in the station's history that it is ADA accessible, a new escalator, heated waiting room, new staircases, lighting, benches, WiFi interconnectivity, USB charging stations, information stations, and a new platform heating system that dries the platform in the winter known as ASIMS.

== Station layout ==
This station has one twelve-car-long high-level island platform between the two tracks, serving trains in both directions.
