= Wantagh, New York =

- Hamlet and census-designated place
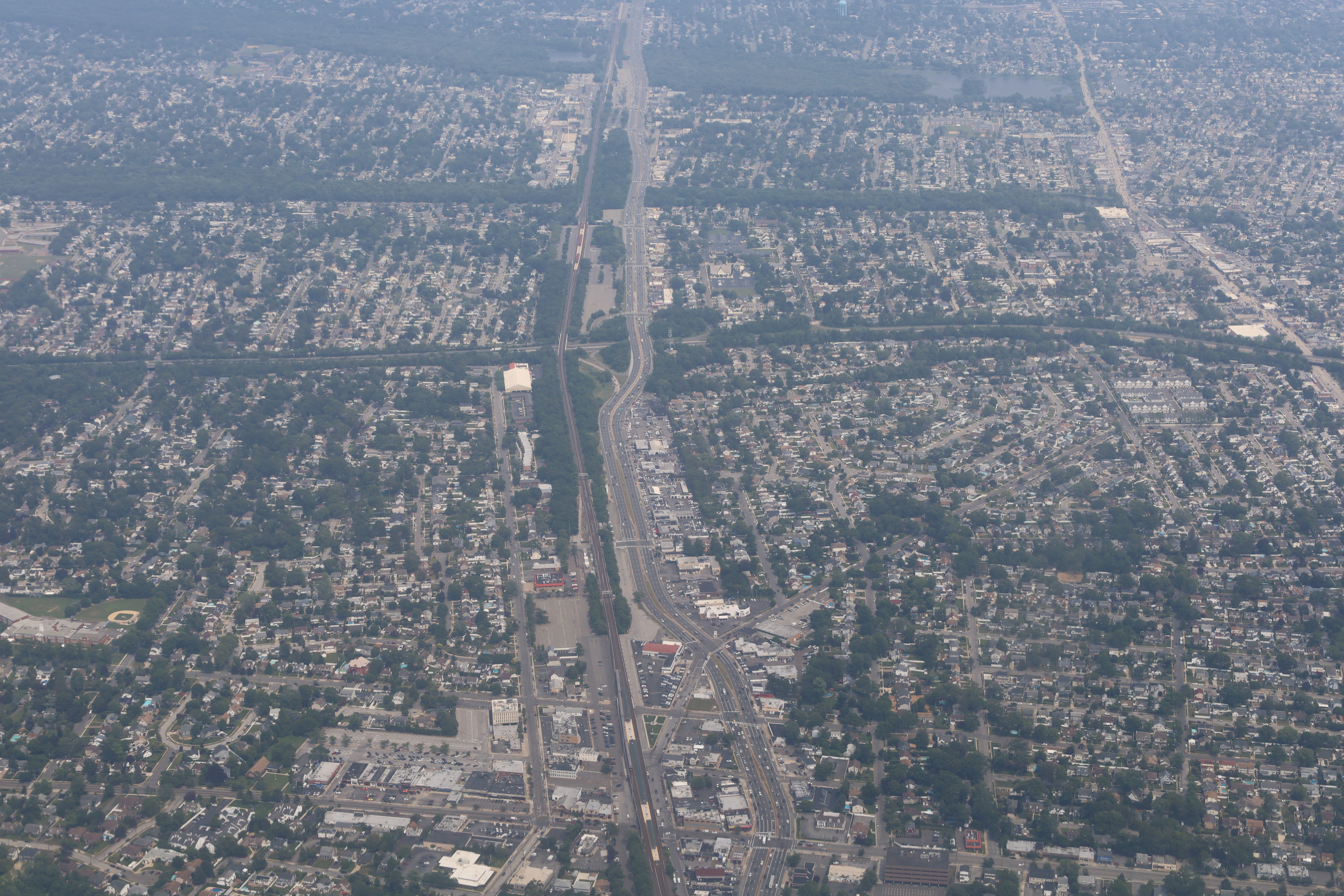
- An aerial view of Wantagh in 2021.
- Motto: "The Gateway to Jones Beach"
- Location in Nassau County and the state of New York.

- Location on Long Island Location within the state of New York
- Coordinates: 40°40′29″N 73°30′38″W
- Country: United States
- State: New York
- County: Nassau
- Town: Hempstead

Area
  - Total: 4.13 sq mi (10.69 km^{2})
  - Land: 3.83 sq mi (9.92 km^{2})
  - Water: 0.30 sq mi (0.77 km^{2})
- Elevation: 23 ft (7 m)

Population (2020)
  - Total: 18,613
  - Density: 4,860.1/sq mi (1,876.49/km^{2})
- Demonym: Wantonian
- Time zone: UTC-5 (Eastern (EST))
  - Summer (DST): UTC-4 (EDT)
- ZIP Codes: 11793 (Wantagh); 11710 (Bellmore)
- Area codes: 516, 363
- FIPS code: 36-78146
- GNIS feature ID: 0968763
- Website: www.wantagh.li

Wantagh (/ˈwɒntɔː/ won-TAW) is a hamlet and census-designated place (CDP) in the Town of Hempstead in Nassau County, on Long Island, New York, United States. The population was 18,613 at the time of the 2020 census.

Wantagh is known as "The Gateway to Jones Beach".

== History ==
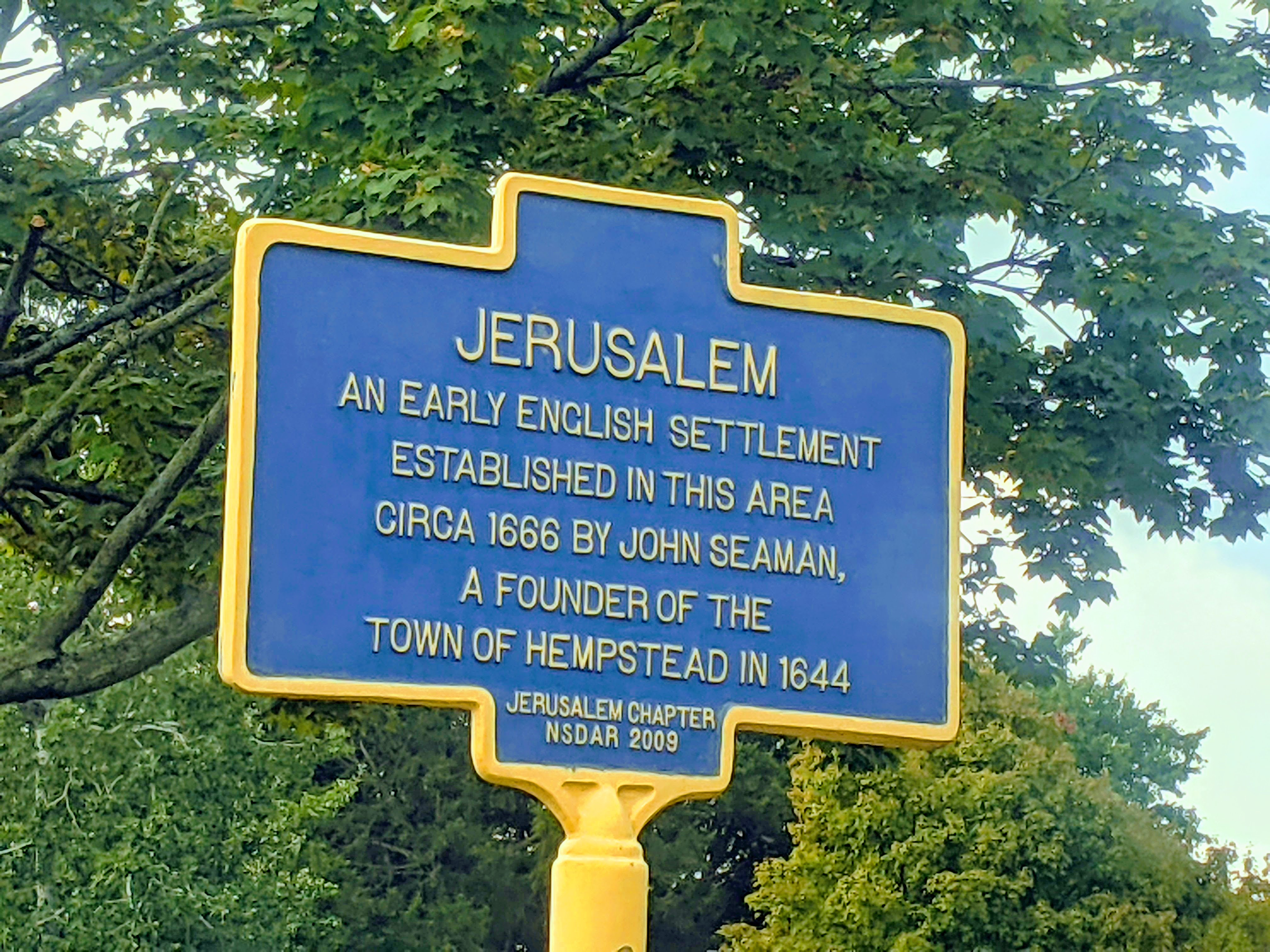
Jerusalem historic marker in Wantagh

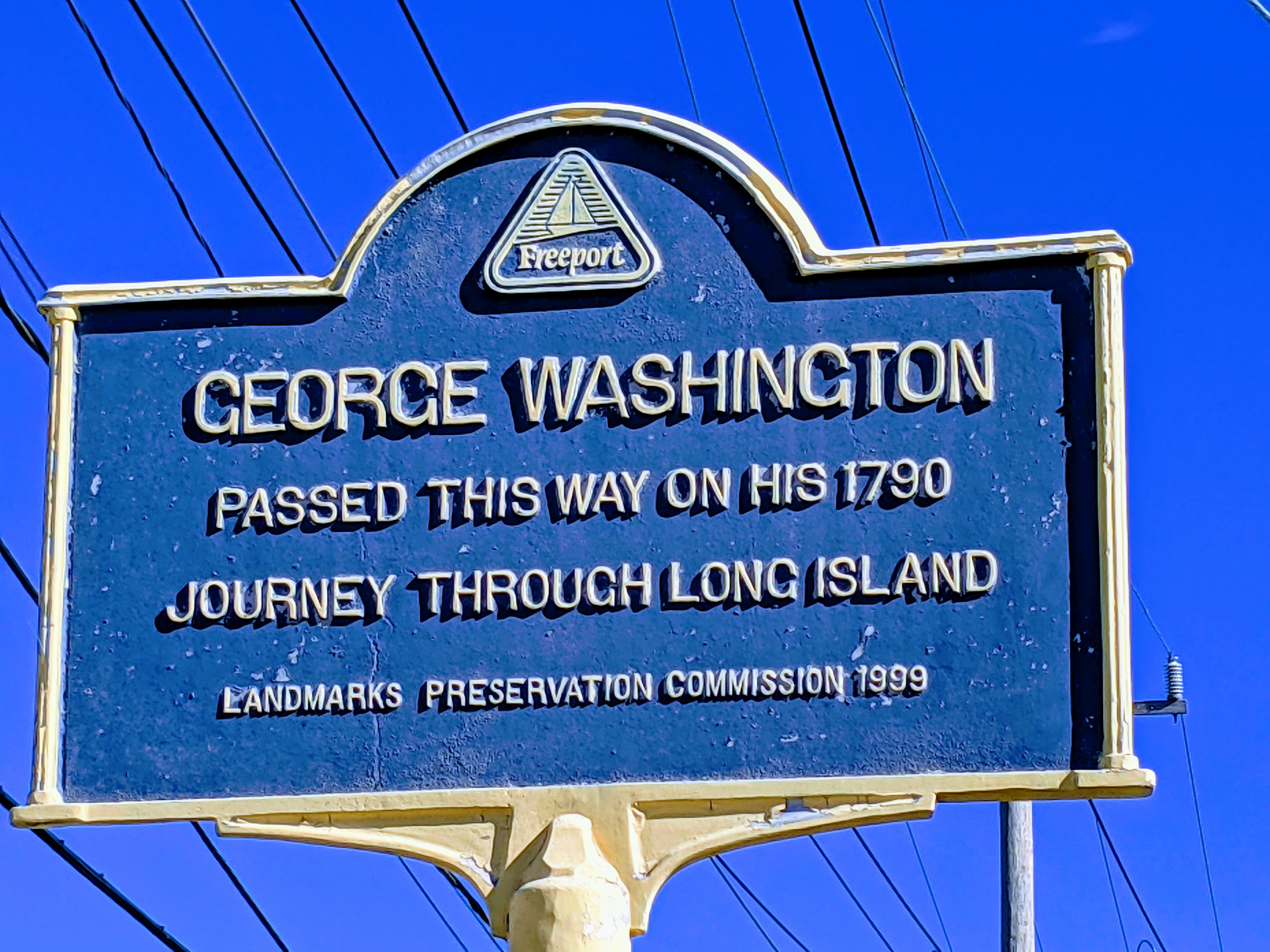
A historic marker noting President George Washington's 1790 journey on Babylon Turnpike

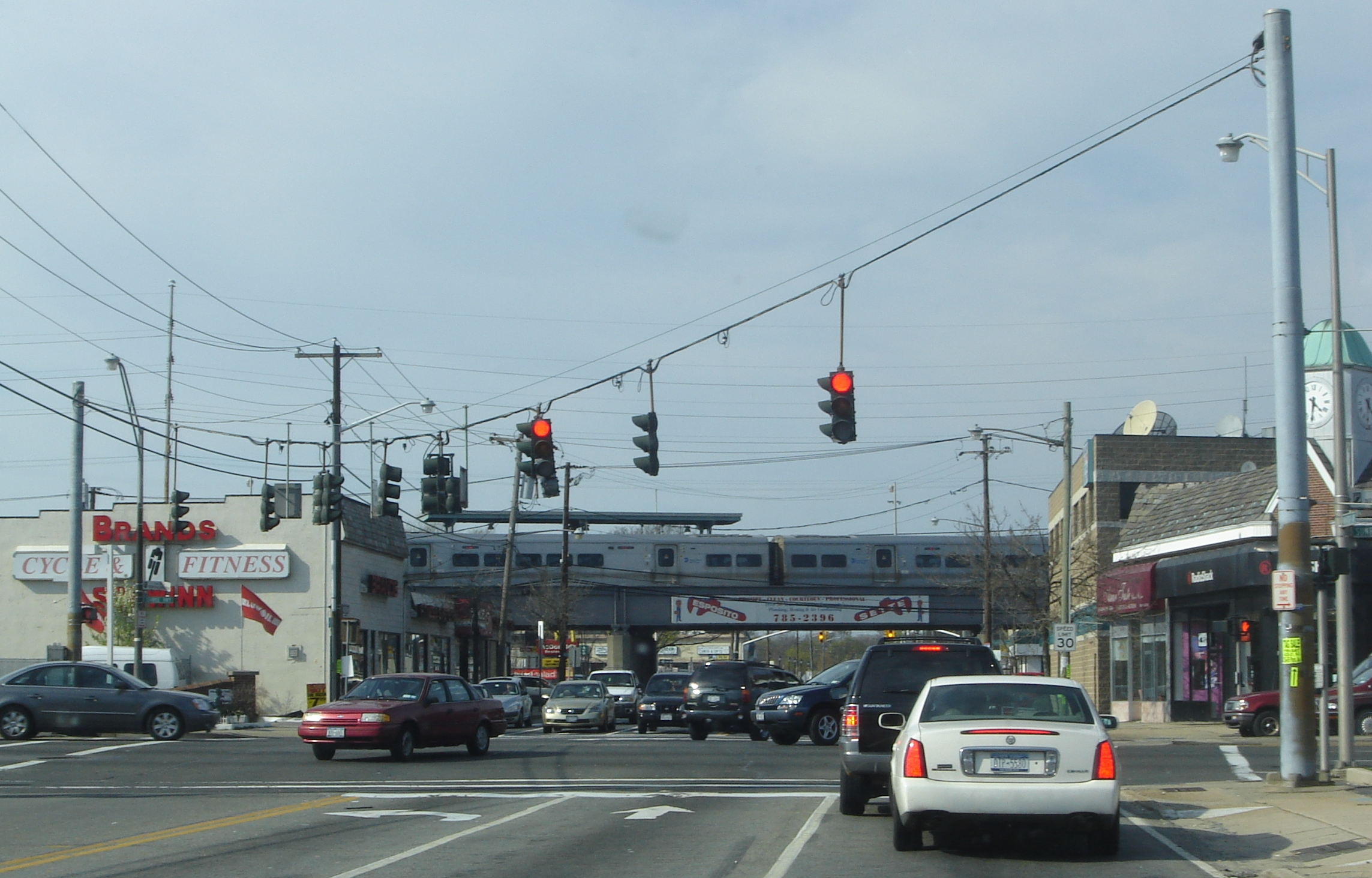
Intersection of Wantagh Avenue and Sunrise Highway

=== 17th century ===
The Wantagh area was inhabited by the Indigenous Merokee (or Merikoke) tribe prior to the first wave of European settlement in the mid-17th century. The Merokee were part of the greater Montauk tribe that loosely ruled Long Island's Native Americans. Wantagh was the sachem (chief) of the Merokee tribe in 1647, and was later the grand sachem of the Montauk tribe from 1651 to 1658. The Dutch settlers came east from their New Amsterdam colony, and English settlers came south from Connecticut and Massachusetts settlements. When the English and Dutch settled their competing claims to Long Island in the 1650 treaty conducted in Hartford, the Dutch partition included all lands west of Oyster Bay and thus the Wantagh area. Long Island then was ceded to the Duke of York in 1663–64, but then fell back into Dutch hands after the Dutch regained New York in 1673. The Treaty of Westminster in 1674 settled the land claims once and for all, incorporating Long Island into the now-British colony of New York.

=== 18th century ===
Early settler accounts refer to Wantagh as "Jerusalem". The creek running north–south through Wantagh, and which has been covered up in many places but is still visible between the Wantagh Parkway and the housing developments west of Wantagh Avenue, was originally the Jerusalem River. The original post office was built in 1837, for Jerusalem, but mail service from Brooklyn began around 1780. The town's first school was established in 1790. At some time around the 1880s, Jerusalem was renamed Ridgewood, and the town's original LIRR station was named "Ridgewood Station". Later, Ridgewood was renamed Wantagh to avoid confusion with another town in New York State with the same name.

George Washington rode through Jerusalem on April 21, 1790, as part of his 5-day tour of Long Island. The Daughters of the American Revolution have placed a plaque on Hempstead Turnpike to commemorate Washington's travels, which took him from Hempstead on Jerusalem Road (now North Jerusalem Road) to Jerusalem, on to Merrick Road. He then went on to head east, then circle back west on the north shore. During the Revolutionary War, British ships traveled up Jones inlet and came ashore to raid Jerusalem farms.

The oldest original settlers of the Wantagh/Jerusalem area were the Jackson and Seaman families, and their marks are still visible. The Cherrywood shopping center (at the corner of Jerusalem and Wantagh avenues) was the site of prominent settler Capt. John Seaman's estate, which was named Cherrywood. Wantagh is home to a number of New York State Historical Markers (9 of Nassau County's 25), including:

- Cherrywood, Capt. John Seaman's 300-acre (1.2 km^{2}) estate and home, from 1644, on the corner of Wantagh and Jerusalem avenues
- 1666 Jackson House, the home of Col. John Jackson, Brig. Gen. Jacob Shearman Jackson, and Samuel Jackson Jones (in 1923), on Merrick Road east of Riverside Drive
- The Grist Mill Site, granted to Col. John Jackson on the Jerusalem River in 1704, on Merrick Road east of Riverside Drive
- The Cornbury Patent, given by Queen Anne conferring the present-day site of Jones Beach to Major Thomas Jones, whose family would later provide the land that would become Jones Beach State Park in 1929
- The 1644 home of Robert Jackson, Jerusalem's pioneer settler, on Wantagh Avenue south of Hempstead Avenue
- North Jerusalem Road, originally constructed in 1644 between Hempstead and Jerusalem
- The 1777 home of Richard Jackson, Captain in the Queens County Militia in the Revolutionary War, and where his daughter, Jane, lived with her husband, ex-Hessian soldier Lt. John Althause, on Wantagh Avenue and Island Road

The Samuel and Elbert Jackson House was listed on the National Register of Historic Places in 2006.

The oldest cemetery in Wantagh is the Jackson Cemetery, located just north of the St. Frances de Chantal Roman Catholic Church on Wantagh Avenue. There are 63 confirmed graves that include descendants from the Seaman and Jackson families, with the most notable including Thomas Jackson, who served in the Revolutionary War in the Second New York Regiment and participated in the Battle of Long Island and the storming of Fort St. George under Major Talmadge in 1780, and who was the original landowner of the site of land around the Wantagh Public Library; and General Jacob Seaman Jackson, a brigadier general in the War of 1812 and senior warden of Long Island's first chartered Masonic lodge in 1797.

The Rierson burial plot was located in what has been redeveloped into Bunker Avenue. This cemetery includes members of the Rierson family who were Loyalists during the American Revolutionary War.

The Jerusalem Society of Friends Cemetery is located behind (east of) the current Christian Tabernacle Church. The Society of Friends were Quakers who maintained meeting houses in Jericho, Bethpage, and Hempstead, and met in then-Jerusalem as early as 1697. Capt. John Seaman allowed the Society to conduct meetings on his land in 1699, but the congregation later traveled to Bethpage to worship.

=== 19th century ===
The Jerusalem Society of Friends purchased land from another Seaman, Arden Seaman, and then constructed their own meeting house on the site of the current Christian Tabernacle Church in 1827, and added the cemetery in 1861. By the 1940s, the congregation had dwindled significantly, and the property was sold in 1952 to the newly formed Wantagh Baptist Church and then recently sold to the newly formed Christian Tabernacle Church in 2007. The cemetery contains the graves of three Civil War veterans: Lt. H.R. Jackson, Gilbert Seaman, of the 139th Regiment of NY Volunteers, and Charles Wilson, of the 119th Regiment of NY Volunteers and who was wounded in Gettysburg.

The St. John of Jerusalem Cemetery served the German Methodists, who moved to Jerusalem from New York City around 1850 to farm. The cemetery can be found west of Wantagh Avenue a few hundred yards north of North Jerusalem Road (now North Wantagh). The congregation began to meet in 1854 and held services entirely in German. The cemetery was constructed in 1862 and was intended only for use by congregation members and their families.

=== 20th century ===
Later generations of congregants grew weary of the services in German, and numbers dwindled until the last German service was held in 1911. From 1912 to 1926, the church remained unused. The church has since been used by a local Lutheran congregation from 1926 to 1940, and a United Christian congregation from 1949 to 1969. Since then, however, the church has remained unused, although the cemetery has been fenced in and maintained by a board of trustees. The cemetery contains graves of veterans from the Civil War, Spanish–American War, World War I, World War II, and Vietnam.

The area that became today's Wantagh continued primarily as a farming area until the construction of Sunrise Highway and Jones Beach in the early 20th century, when tourism and fishing took hold, centering on Jones Beach. The Long Island Rail Road has served the town since 1885 and possibly as early as 1867, but the town did not take on a suburban character until the housing development between the 1950s and 1970s. The LIRR tracks were completely elevated in 1968, along with neighboring Seaford station. The Wantagh Railroad Complex was added to the National Register of Historic Places in 1983.

Former U.S. President Richard Nixon's dog, Checkers, is buried at Wantagh's Bide-a-Wee Pet Cemetery on Beltagh Avenue.

== Geography ==
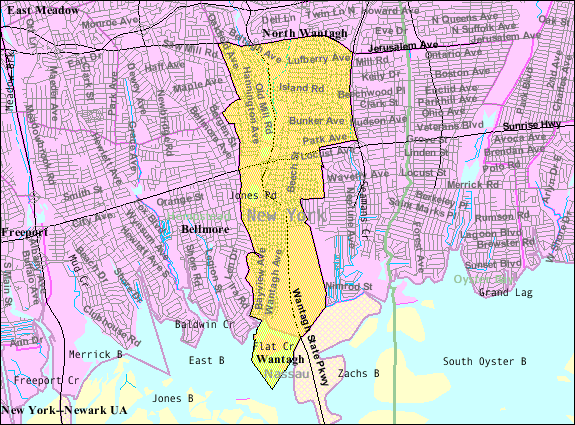
U.S. Census map of Wantagh

According to the U.S. Census Bureau, Wantagh has a total area of 4.1 square miles (11 km^{2}), 3.8 square miles (9.8 km^{2}) of which is land and 0.3 square miles (0.78 km^{2}), or 7.25%, of which is water.

=== Climate ===
Wantagh has a warm temperate climate (type Cfa) with cool winters, hot summers, and mild springs and falls. Precipitation is spread uniformly throughout the year, but peaks slightly in early winter and early spring. It is located in hardiness zone 8a due to its south shore location; most of Long Island is situated in zone 7b.

Climate data for Wantagh, NY, 1991-2020 normals
Month	Jan	Feb	Mar	Apr	May	Jun	Jul	Aug	Sep	Oct	Nov	Dec	Year
Mean daily maximum °F (°C)	41.8 (5.4)	43.6 (6.4)	49.9 (9.9)	59.6 (15.3)	69.6 (20.9)	79.4 (26.3)	85.1 (29.5)	83.6 (28.7)	77.6 (25.3)	66.8 (19.3)	55.7 (13.2)	46.9 (8.3)	63.3 (17.4)
Daily mean °F (°C)	34.7 (1.5)	36.2 (2.3)	42.3 (5.7)	51.3 (10.7)	61.2 (16.2)	71.0 (21.7)	76.9 (24.9)	75.6 (24.2)	69.1 (20.6)	58.3 (14.6)	47.8 (8.8)	39.9 (4.4)	55.4 (13.0)
Mean daily minimum °F (°C)	27.5 (−2.5)	28.8 (−1.8)	34.7 (1.5)	43.0 (6.1)	52.9 (11.6)	62.6 (17.0)	68.7 (20.4)	67.7 (19.8)	60.7 (15.9)	49.8 (9.9)	39.9 (4.4)	32.9 (0.5)	47.4 (8.6)
Average precipitation inches (mm)	3.33 (85)	2.81 (71)	4.06 (103)	3.81 (97)	3.34 (85)	3.77 (96)	3.24 (82)	3.72 (94)	3.64 (92)	3.66 (93)	3.07 (78)	4.35 (110)	42.80 (1,087)
Average precipitation days (≥ 0.01 in)	10.3	9.1	10.6	11.4	10.6	9.5	8.4	8.4	7.9	8.3	8.5	10.7	113.7
Source: NOAA

== Demographics ==
Historical population
Census	Pop.	Note	%±
2000	18,971		—
2010	18,871		−0.5%
2020	18,613		−1.4%
U.S. Decennial Census

=== Racial and ethnic composition ===
Wantaugh CDP, New York – Racial and ethnic composition Note: the US Census treats Hispanic/Latino as an ethnic category. This table excludes Latinos from the racial categories and assigns them to a separate category. Hispanics/Latinos may be of any race.
Race / Ethnicity (NH = Non-Hispanic)	Pop 2000	Pop 2010	Pop 2020	% 2000	% 2010	% 2020
White alone (NH)	17,829	17,380	16,211	93.98%	92.10%	87.10%
Black or African American alone (NH)	35	51	59	0.18%	0.27%	0.32%
Native American or Alaska Native alone (NH)	4	7	7	0.02%	0.04%	0.04%
Asian alone (NH)	357	372	495	1.88%	1.97%	2.66%
Native Hawaiian or Pacific Islander alone (NH)	0	1	0	0.00%	0.01%	0.00%
Other race alone (NH)	21	28	64	0.11%	0.15%	0.34%
Mixed race or Multiracial (NH)	106	143	378	0.56%	0.76%	2.03%
Hispanic or Latino (any race)	619	889	1,399	3.26%	4.71%	7.52%
Total	18,971	18,871	18,613	100.00%	100.00%	100.00%

=== 2020 census ===
As of the 2020 census, Wantagh had a population of 18,613. The median age was 42.4 years. 22.4% of residents were under the age of 18 and 16.8% of residents were 65 years of age or older. For every 100 females there were 95.1 males, and for every 100 females age 18 and over there were 92.8 males age 18 and over.

100.0% of residents lived in urban areas, while 0.0% lived in rural areas.

There were 6,062 households in Wantagh, of which 36.8% had children under the age of 18 living in them. Of all households, 70.1% were married-couple households, 9.1% were households with a male householder and no spouse or partner present, and 17.7% were households with a female householder and no spouse or partner present. About 13.4% of all households were made up of individuals and 8.2% had someone living alone who was 65 years of age or older.

There were 6,228 housing units, of which 2.7% were vacant. The homeowner vacancy rate was 0.6% and the rental vacancy rate was 2.7%.

Racial composition as of the 2020 census
Race	Number	Percent
White	16,595	89.2%
Black or African American	64	0.3%
American Indian and Alaska Native	13	0.1%
Asian	499	2.7%
Native Hawaiian and Other Pacific Islander	0	0.0%
Some other race	294	1.6%
Two or more races	1,148	6.2%
Hispanic or Latino (of any race)	1,399	7.5%

=== 2000 census ===
As of the census of 2000, there were 18,971 people, 6,179 households, and 5,215 families residing in the CDP. The population density was 4,936.3 inhabitants per square mile (1,905.9/km^{2}). There were 6,250 housing units at an average density of 1,626.3 per square mile (627.9/km^{2}). The racial makeup of the CDP was 96.75% white, 0.20% black or African American, 0.04% Native American, 1.89% Asian, 0.34% from other races, and 0.79% from two or more races. Hispanic or Latino of any race were 3.26% of the population.

There were 6,179 households, out of which 41.2% had children under the age of 18 living with them, 73.8% were married couples living together, 7.9% had a female householder with no husband present, and 15.6% were non-families. 13.2% of all households were made up of individuals, and 7.4% had someone living alone who was 65 years of age or older. The average household size was 3.06 and the average family size was 3.37.

== Parks and recreation ==
Parks located within the hamlet include:

- Jones Beach State Park
- Mill Pond
- Twin Lakes Preserve
- Wantagh Park

== Education ==
=== Public high schools ===
- MacArthur High School
- Wantagh Senior High School

=== Middle schools ===
- Wantagh Middle School

=== Elementary schools ===
- Forest Lake Elementary School
- Mandalay Elementary School
- Wantagh Elementary School

Wantagh is primarily located in the Wantagh Union Free School District. However, small areas towards the eastern edges of the hamlet are served by the Seaford Union Free School District. And students living in portions of Wantagh north of Jerusalem Avenue are served by the Levittown Union Free School District. Students who reside in Wantagh attend public schools in one of these districts depending on the hamlet in which they reside.

=== Libraries ===
Wantagh is served by the Wantagh Library District and the Seaford Library District. The boundaries of these districts within the hamlet roughly correspond with those of the school districts.

== Transportation ==
=== Rail ===
Commuter rail service in Wantagh is provided by the Long Island Rail Road, specifically at the Wantagh station on the Long Island Rail Road's Babylon Branch. Most parking at the station is limited to Town of Hempstead residents and requires a permit. Express trains to Penn Station average roughly a 45-minute one-way trip.

=== Bus ===
Bus service in Wantagh is provided by the n19 (Freeport LIRR–Sunrise Mall), as well as the n54 and n55 (Hempstead Transit Center–Sunrise Mall); these lines are operated by Nassau Inter-County Express (NICE).

=== Road ===
Merrick Road, the Seaford–Oyster Bay Expressway, Sunrise Highway, Wantagh Avenue, and the Wantagh State Parkway all traverse and have major intersections or exits/entrances within Wantagh.

== Notable people ==
- Craig D. Button, U.S. Air Force pilot noted for his mysterious flight and crash
- Rob Cesternino, third-place finisher, Survivor: The Amazon; Survivor: All-Stars participant; host of Rob Has a Podcast; author of The Tribe and I Have Spoken: The Definitive (Unofficial) Lore and Legacy from the Game's Smartest Surviving Loser (Simon & Schuster, 2026)
- Keaton Nigel Cooke, actor and singer
- Ed Emshwiller, filmmaker, science fiction illustrator, and video artist
- Amy Fisher (born 1974), known as the "Long Island Lolita"; shot and seriously wounded Mary Jo Buttafuoco in 1992 in a case that became a national media sensation; pleaded guilty to first-degree reckless assault and served nearly seven years in prison; her story was the subject of three television movies aired simultaneously in 1993
- Todd Hodne, former Penn State football player and convicted murderer
- Al Iaquinta, mixed martial artist
- Tom Junod, journalist
- Trent Kowalik, Tony Award-winning actor, Billy Elliot the Musical
- James Preller, author, Jigsaw Jones series
- Jason Reich, Emmy Award-winning television writer, The Daily Show
- Lonny Ross, actor and comedian, 30 Rock
- Gary J. Shapiro, author and president and CEO, Consumer Technology Association
- John Silver, professional wrestler
- Frances Townsend, U.S. Homeland Security Adviser under President George W. Bush
- Allen Weisselberg (born 1947), businessman; former Chief Financial Officer of the Trump Organization; longtime resident of Wantagh; pleaded guilty to tax fraud in 2022 and to perjury in 2024 in connection with his role at the Trump Organization
- Alan Zweibel, author and comedy writer
