= Babylon Branch =

Long Island Rail Road branch

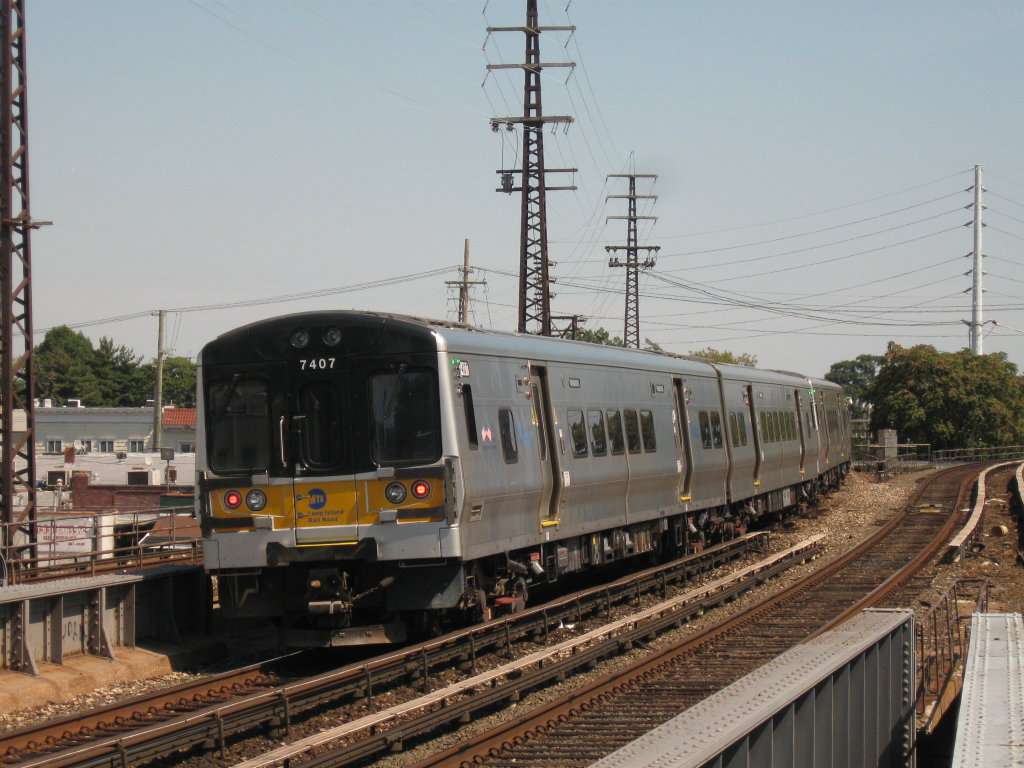
- Eastbound Babylon Branch train departing the Lynbrook station

Overview
- Status: Operational
- Owner: Long Island Rail Road
- Locale: Nassau and Suffolk County, New York, USA
- Termini: Valley Interlocking; Babylon
- Stations: 14

Service
- Type: Commuter rail
- System: Long Island Rail Road
- Services: Babylon Branch Montauk Branch West Hempstead Branch
- Operator: Metropolitan Transportation Authority
- Ridership: 13,456,039 (annual ridership, 2025)

History
- Opened: 1867 (as part of the Southern Railroad of Long Island)

Technical
- Track gauge: 4 ft 8 1/2 in (1,435 mm) standard gauge
- Electrification: Third rail, 750 V DC
Route map
- Distances shown from Long Island City via the Lower Montauk Branch

The Babylon Branch is a rail service operated by the Long Island Rail Road in the U.S. state of New York. The term refers to the trains serving Montauk Branch stations from Valley Stream east to Babylon; in other words, the Babylon Branch is a rail service running on elevated tracks like a subway would, rather than on actual track. The electrification of the Montauk Branch ends east of the Babylon station, so the Babylon Branch is mostly served by electric trains.

The west end of the "Babylon Branch" is the junction between the West Hempstead Branch and Montauk Branch (Valley Interlocking); St. Albans, the only stop on the Montauk Branch west of Valley Stream, is serviced only by West Hempstead Branch trains. Some Montauk Branch trains operate nonstop through Babylon Branch stations until reaching Babylon, though others use the Central Branch between Belmont Junction west of Babylon station and a junction at Beth Interlocking on the Main Line southeast of Bethpage Station, running to New York City via the Main Line. Babylon Branch trains typically stop at Forest Hills and Kew Gardens during off-peak hours and on weekends, and some trains originate or terminate at Wantagh, Seaford, or Massapequa.

The Babylon Branch portion of the Montauk Branch is completely grade separated with bridges over all intersecting roadways. New York State Route 231 and the Meadowbrook Parkway are the two exceptions to this; the tracks pass under these roadways.

== History ==
=== Early history ===
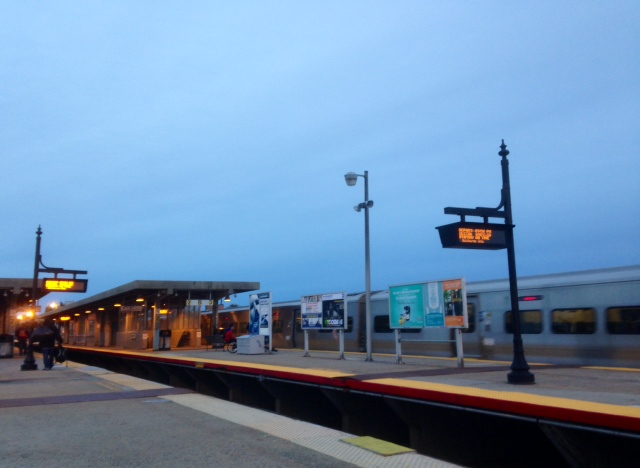
Babylon station

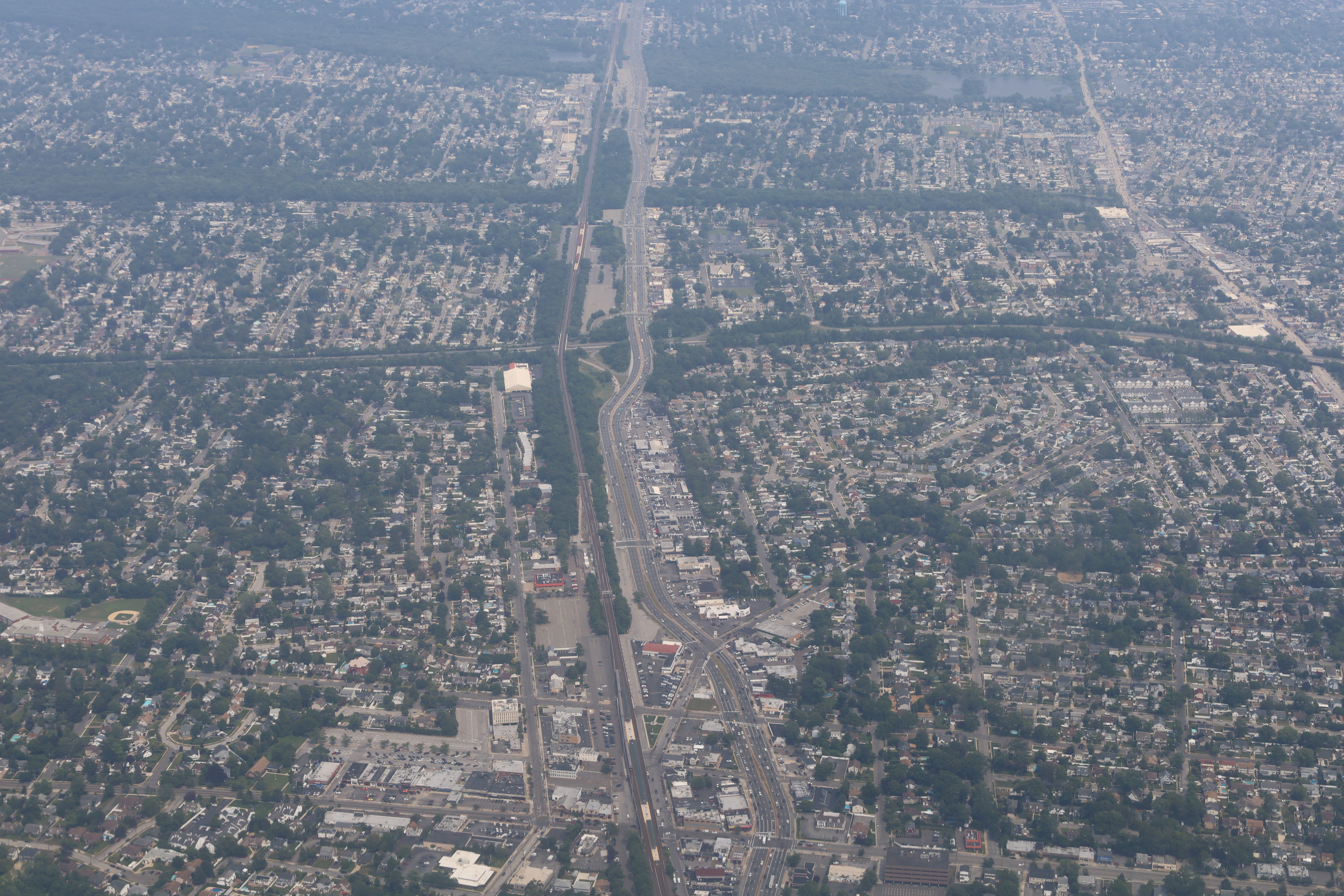
Aerial view of (from bottom) the Wantagh, Seaford, and Massapequa stations along the Babylon Branch

The South Side Railroad of Long Island in the 1860s built what was to become the Montauk Branch of the Long Island Rail Road. The Babylon Branch as a separate operational entity began as the electrification of the Montauk Branch between Valley Stream and Babylon on May 20, 1925. Eventually, this would also include the former "Springfield Branch" which the Montauk Branch was relocated to northeast of Springfield Junction.

=== Grade-separation project ===
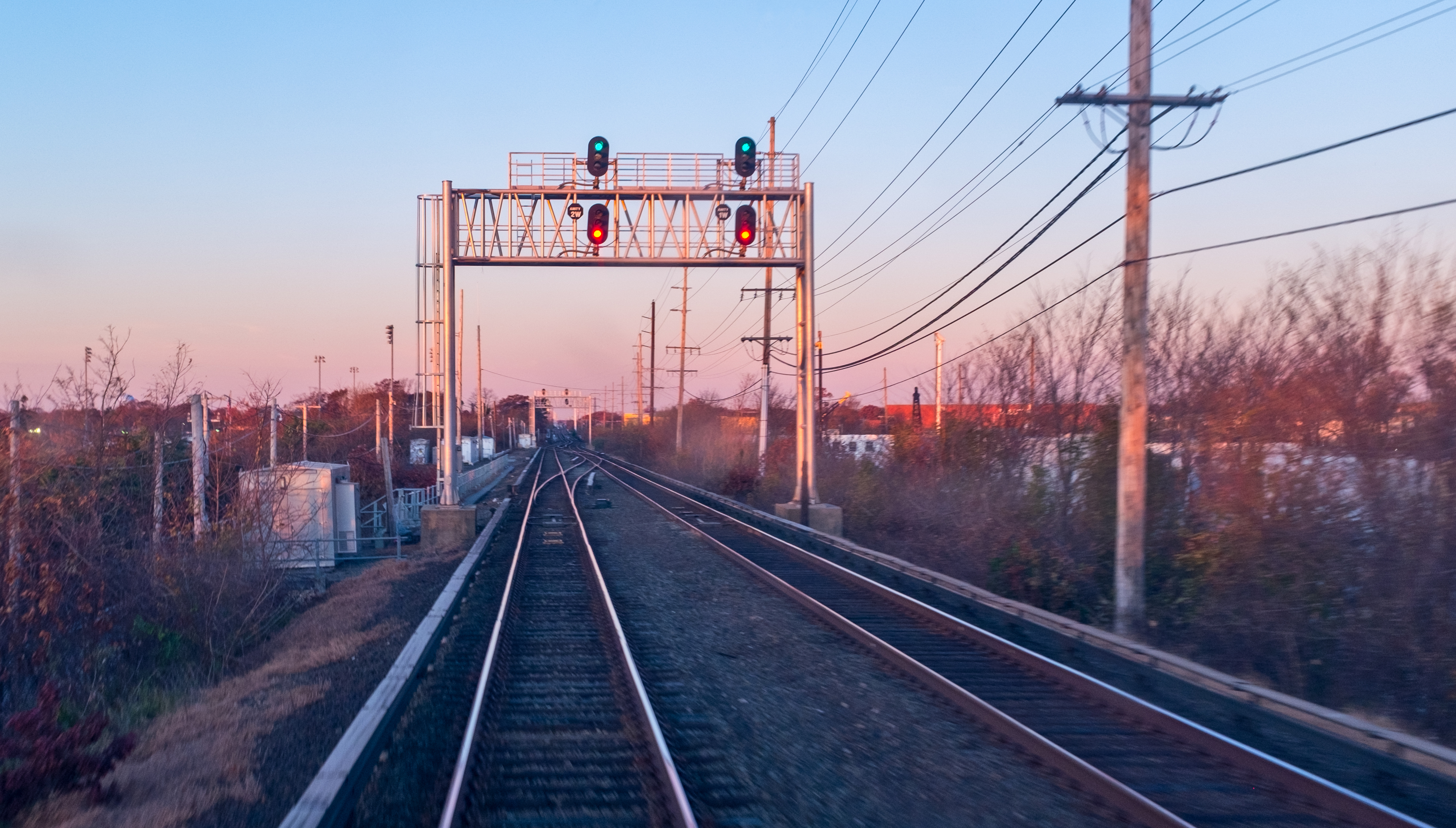
Color light signals at the Amityville crossovers

The tracks were elevated from ground level between 1950 and 1980. Elevation of the line sparked grass-roots efforts to preserve the previous versions of Wantagh and Lindenhurst Stations, the former of which resulted in the creation of the Wantagh Railroad Museum. The last station to be elevated on the branch was Massapequa Park on December 13, 1980.

On December 30, 1968, the first revenue train of M1 cars departed Babylon for Penn Station. In anticipation, all stations that were still at grade level had their platforms converted from low-level to high-level (an increase of 4 feet) from late-1967 to late-1968 in time for when the fleet went into service. Stations that were still at-grade at the time were Lindenhurst, Copiague, Amityville, Massapequa Park, Bellmore, and Merrick. The former three's grade separation projects had just gotten underway a few months prior, while Massapequa Park was still at-grade and the latter two were being prepared for their projects. All stations that had been elevated were equipped with single high-level island platforms, except for Babylon, which had two platforms. The call for high-level platforms was due to the M1 lacking steps that the fleet they were replacing had, and to make travel times quicker by several minutes.

Work on grade separation began in 1970. The stretch of track between Amityville and Lindenhurst was grade-separated, with new high-level platforms on elevated viaducts, on August 7, 1973. At the same time, the stretch of track through Bellmore and Merrick was grade-separated, which was completed on June 28, 1975.

In 1977, work began on the $29.5 million project to elevate the line through Massapequa Park to eliminate the three remaining grade crossings. As part of the project, the platform at Massapequa was lengthened to accommodate twelve-car trains, meaning all stations on the branch could accommodate at least ten cars. The platform extension was completed in January 1980. This grade-separation project was completed on December 13, 1980.

In October 1986, work began to extend the platform at Baldwin from being ten cars long to being twelve-cars long. As part of the project, a temporary wooden platform at the station's eastern end would be demolished and replaced by a 300 foot (91 m)-long concrete slab. Work was expected to be completed in three months. Platform extensions had already been completed at Rockville Centre, Freeport, Merrick, and Wantagh.

=== Station renovations ===
Since the 1990s, many station houses along the branch have been rebuilt, including the entire platforms at Seaford from July 2008 to July 2009, Massapequa from late 2013 to mid-2015, and Wantagh from late 2016 to late 2018. Additionally, from July 2007 to April 10, 2011, the signals, switches, and gantries were replaced between Wantagh and Amityville, with color light signals replacing the old position-light signals installed during the elevation of that section in 1973.

A pocket track was built east of the Massapequa station between the two tracks. This was to be completed by Spring 2016, but was pushed back to April 2019.

Plans for the future include the modernization of Babylon Interlocking, viaduct track replacement at certain stations, replacement of platforms, escalators, and elevators at Babylon. In November 2022, the MTA announced that intends to install elevators at Massapequa Park, Amityville, Copiague, and Lindenhurst stations and thus make them ADA accessible; this project was completed by the end of 2024.

Babylon's rehabilitation project was completed and opened in June 2026.

== Stations ==
West of Lynbrook, most trips go on to terminate at Grand Central or Penn Station, with some trips ending at Jamaica or Hunterspoint Avenue.

Zone	Location	Station	Miles (km) from Long Island City	Date opened	Date closed	Connections / notes
3	St. Albans, Queens	St. Albans (limited service)	11.8 (19.0)	1898		New York City Bus: Q3, Q4, Q51, QM64
4	Lynbrook	Lynbrook (limited service)	17.7 (28.5)	1867		Long Island Rail Road: ■ Long Beach Branch; Nassau Inter-County Express: n4, n25/58, n31, n31x, n32 Originally named Pearsall's Corners, then Pearsall's
7	Rockville Centre	Rockville Centre	19.3 (31.1)	1867		Nassau Inter-County Express: n15, n16, n16C, n31x, Mercy Medical Shuttle
7	Baldwin	Baldwin	21.3 (34.3)	1867		Nassau Inter-County Express: n35 Originally named Baldwinsville, then Baldwins
7	Freeport	Freeport	22.6 (36.4)	1867		Nassau Inter-County Express: n4, n19, n19x, n40, n40x, n41, n43, n88x
7	Merrick	Merrick	24.3 (39.1)	1867		
7	Bellmore	Bellmore	25.4 (40.9)	1869		
7	Wantagh	Wantagh	26.5 (42.6)	1867		Originally named Ridgewood
7	Seaford	Seaford	27.7 (44.6)	1899		Nassau Inter-County Express: n54
7	Massapequa	Massapequa	28.6 (46.0)	1867		Nassau Inter-County Express: n54, n55, n80 Originally named South Oyster Bay
7	Massapequa Park	Massapequa Park	29.4 (47.3)	1933		Nassau Inter-County Express: n54, n55, n80
7	East Massapequa	Unqua		1880	1881	
9	Amityville	Amityville	31.3 (50.4)	1868		Nassau Inter-County Express: n54, n55, n71 Suffolk County Transit: 1, 2, 4, 10
9	Copiague	Copiague	32.4 (52.1)	1902		
9	Copiague	Belmont Junction		1875	1876	
9	Lindenhurst	Lindenhurst	33.7 (54.2)	1867		Suffolk County Transit: 10; Originally named Wellwood, then Breslau
9	Babylon	Babylon	36.6 (58.9)	1867		Long Island Rail Road: ■ Montauk Branch; Suffolk County Transit: 2, 3, 5, 10, 15; Originally named Seaside
