= Wantagh Railroad Complex =

Former train station in New York, US

- U.S. National Register of Historic Places
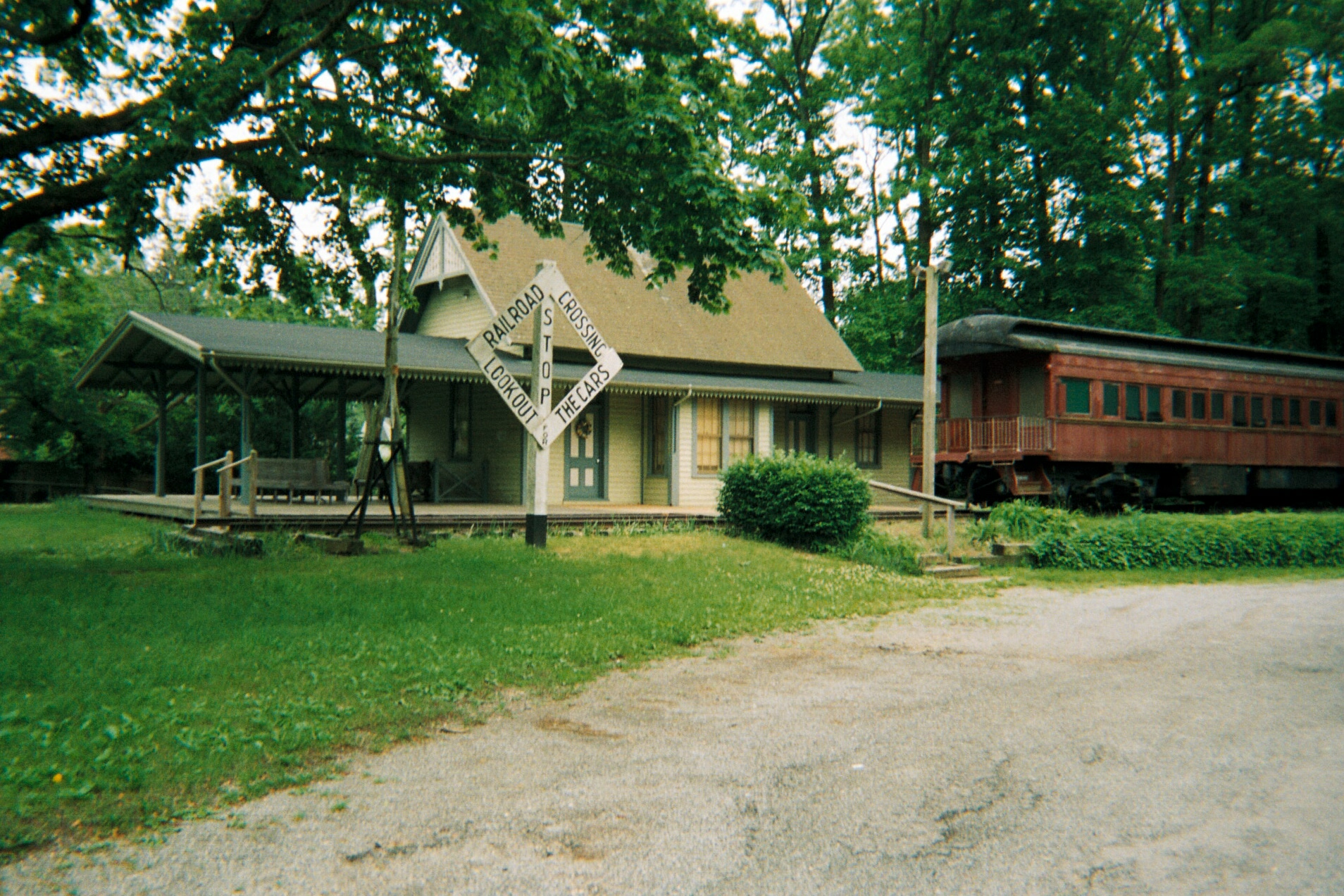
- The old Wantagh Station, with an old Railroad Crossing sign, and LIRR Parlor Car.

- Location within New York Location within the United States
- Location: 1700 Wantagh Avenue, Wantagh, New York
- Coordinates: 40°40′49″N 73°30′38″W
- Area: 1.5 acres (0.61 ha)
- Built: 1885
- NRHP reference No.: 83001716
- Added to NRHP: June 30, 1983

Wantagh Railroad Complex (also known as the Wantagh Museum), is a collection of old buildings in Wantagh, New York. It consists of the 1885-built Wantagh Railroad Station before it was moved from its original location in 1966, when the Babylon Branch was being elevated throughout the mid-20th century. The station itself was a replacement for original South Side Railroad of Long Island station built in 1867. It also includes a diamond-shaped pre-crossbuck railroad crossing sign, and an old grade crossing gate.

== History ==
Throughout the mid-20th century, the Long Island Rail Road was reconstructing the Atlantic and Babylon Branches in Queens, Nassau, and Western Suffolk Counties, which required elevating the lines and rebuilding new stations. In addition, since the mid-1950s Victorian-era stations throughout the system were being torn down and replaced either with modern ones, such as Douglaston station, or sheltered shacks like the controversial Amagansett station. Fearing that Wantagh Station would face the same fate, the Wantagh Preservation Society was established in 1965 for the purpose of maintaining the station in its existing condition and location. Though they failed to keep it along the tracks, the station was still preserved. It was moved a few blocks north to the site of an old neighborhood amusement park in 1966 and restored through 1969. In 1972, the LIRR donated the 1912-built parlor car called "The Jamaica" to the museum, which contained a solarium, cooking facilities and an ice-cooled air conditioning system. Across from the station is a 1907-built post office shack that served as Wantagh's official post office until the mid-1920s. In 1982, the station was opened to the public as a museum, and was added to the National Register of Historic Places on June 30, 1983.

== Gallery ==
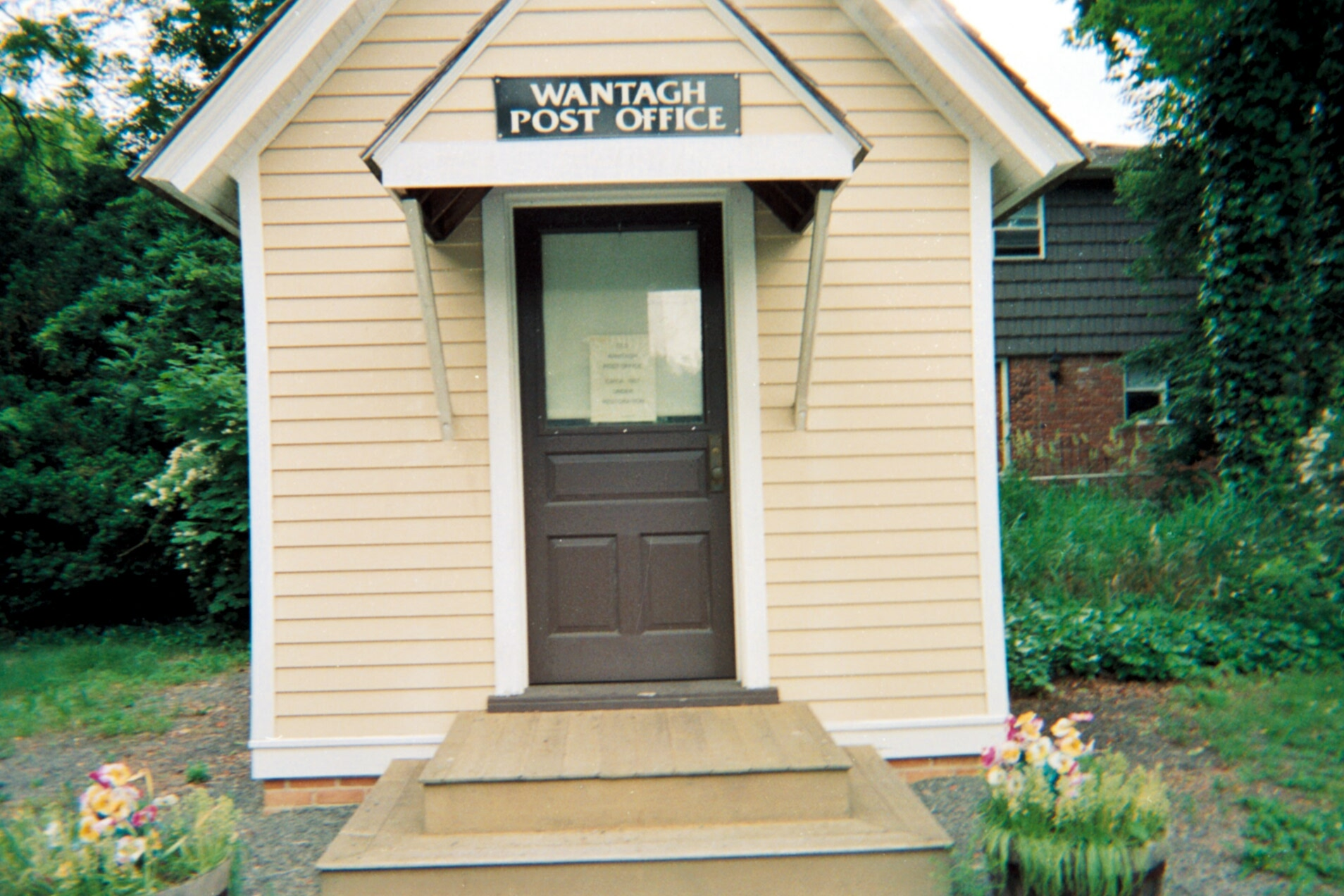
The former 1907-built Wantagh Post Office (although some claim the shack was built in 1905.)

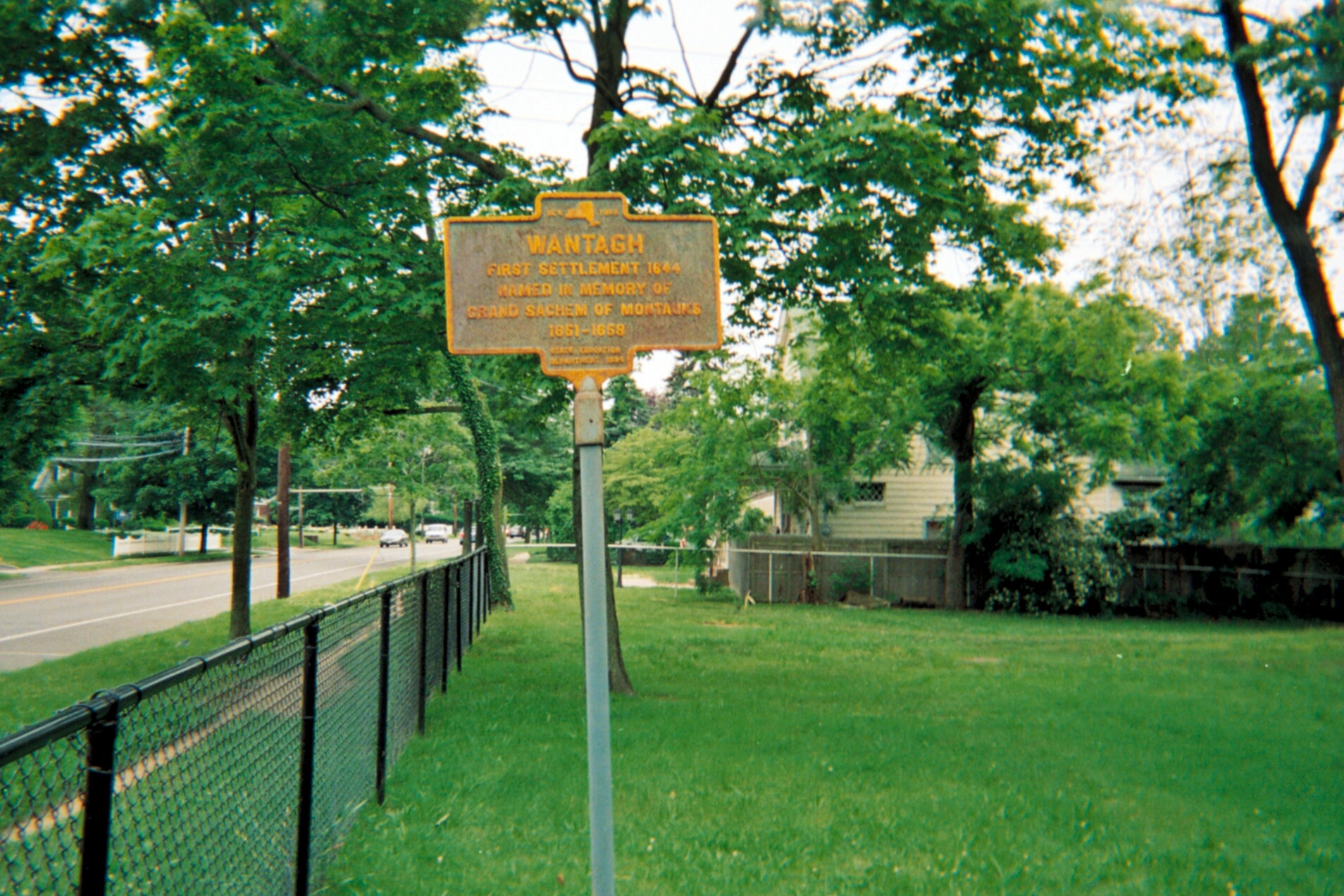
Rusty historic plaque on Wantagh Avenue.

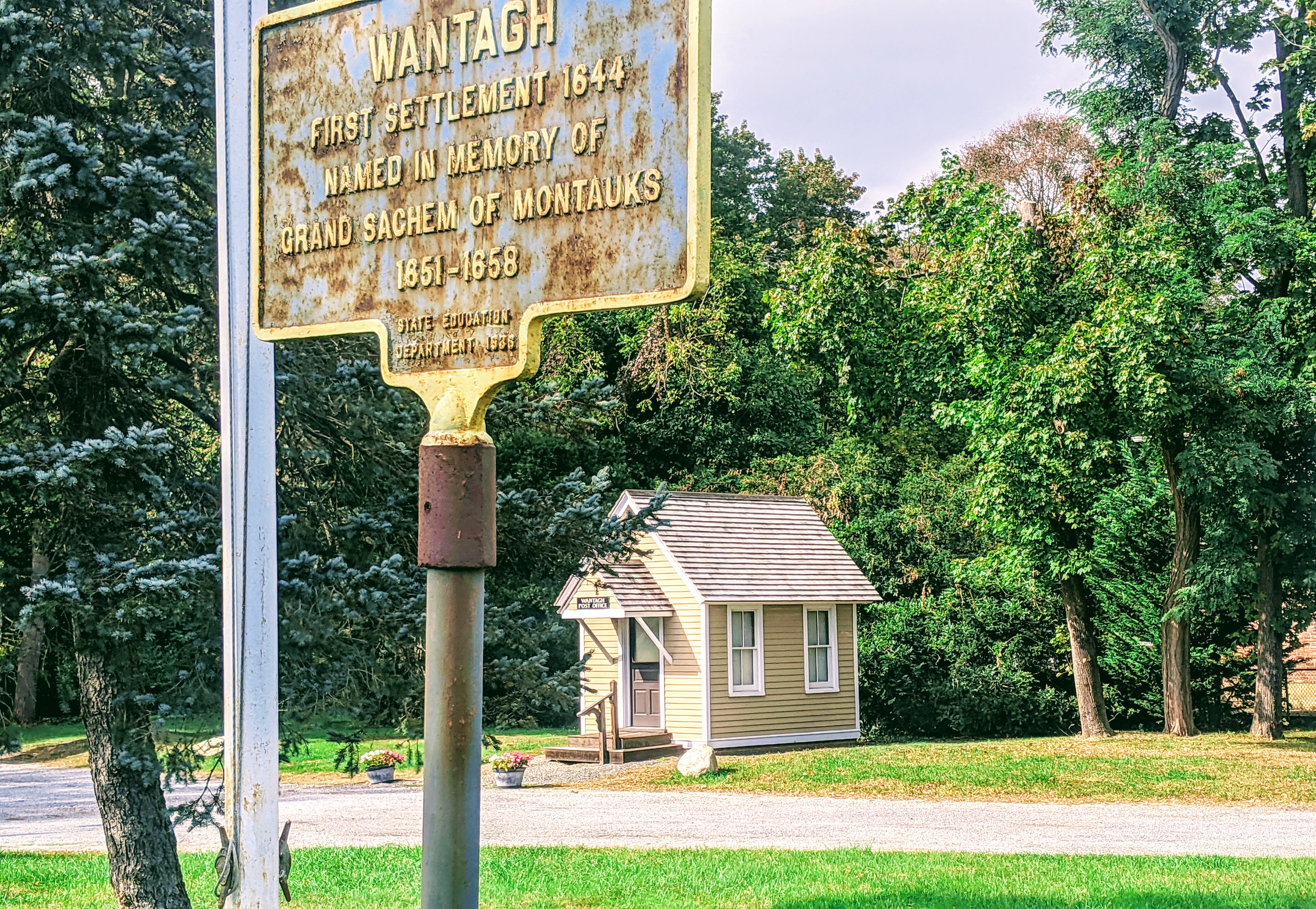
Original Post office and historical marker

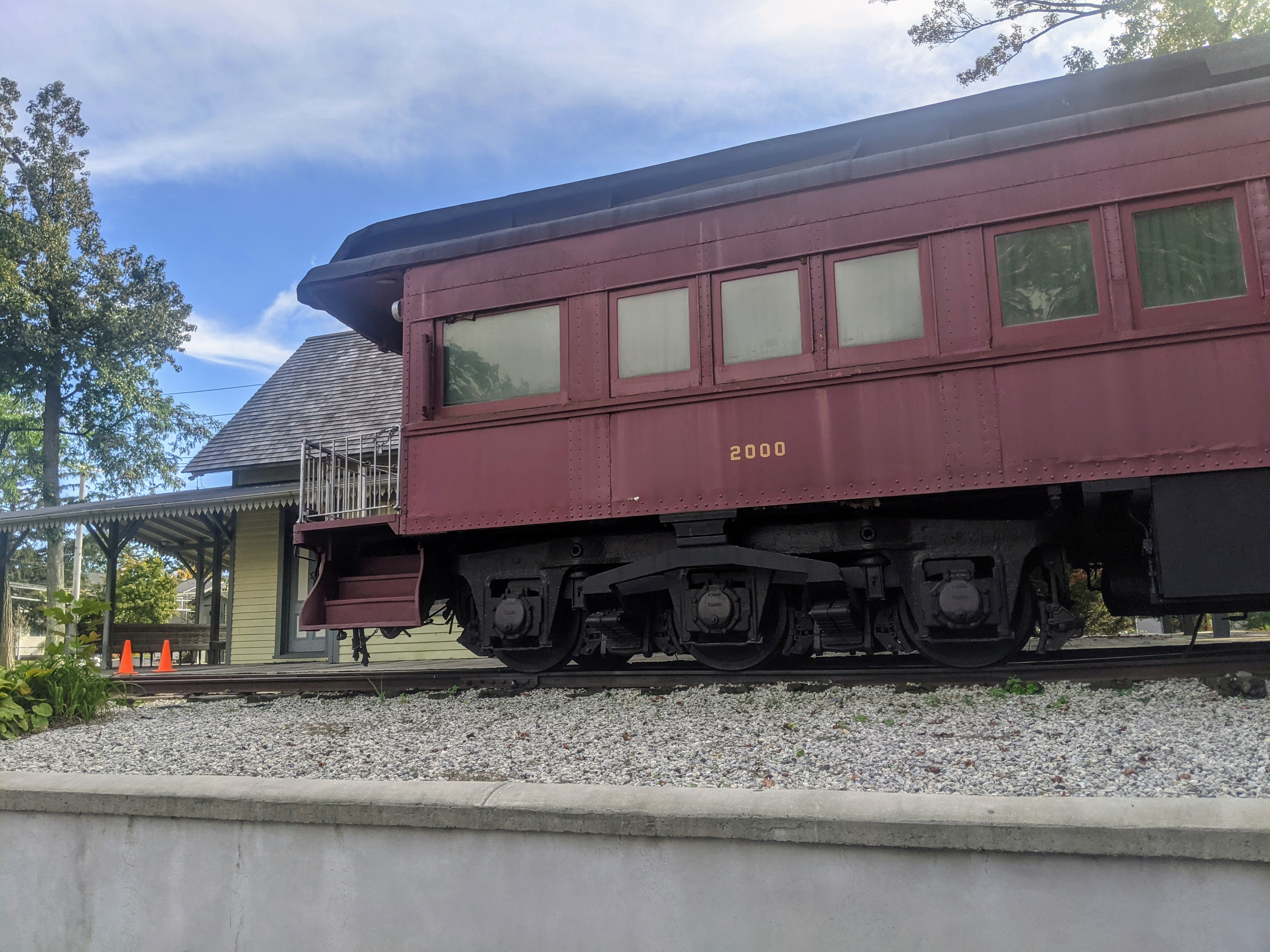
Parlor car #2000 - 'The Jamaica'

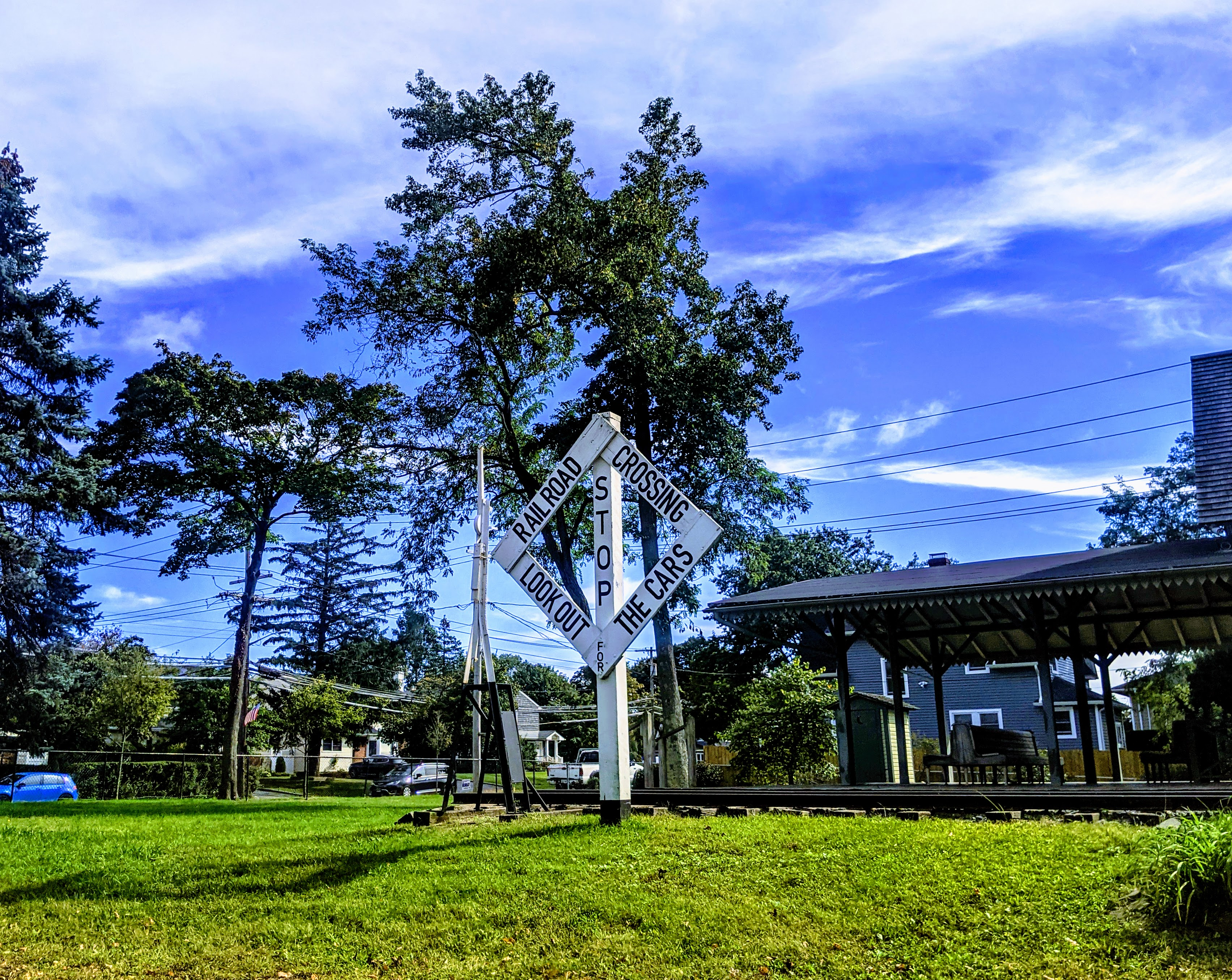
Pre-crossbuck Diamond railroad crossing sign

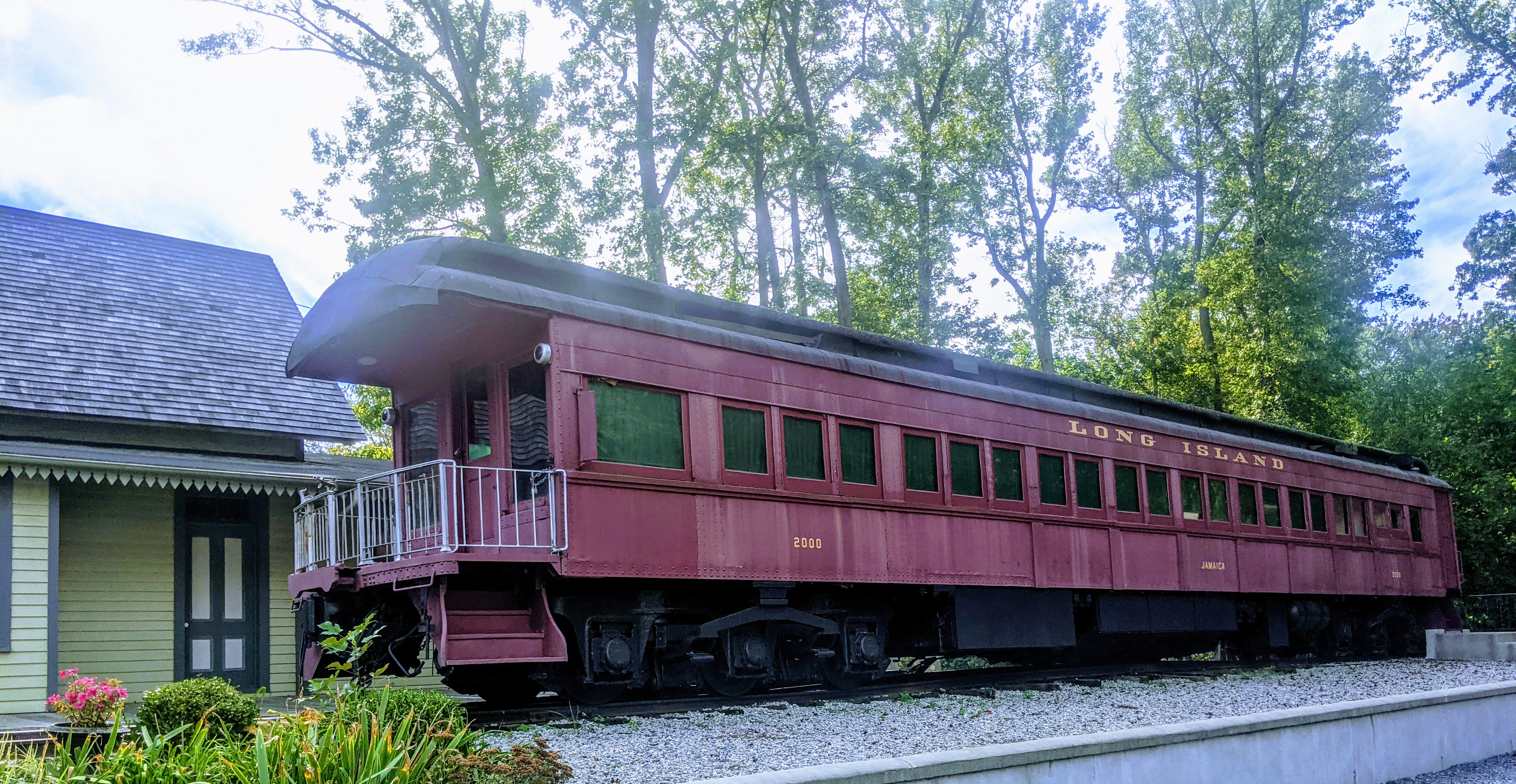
1912 Parlor Car

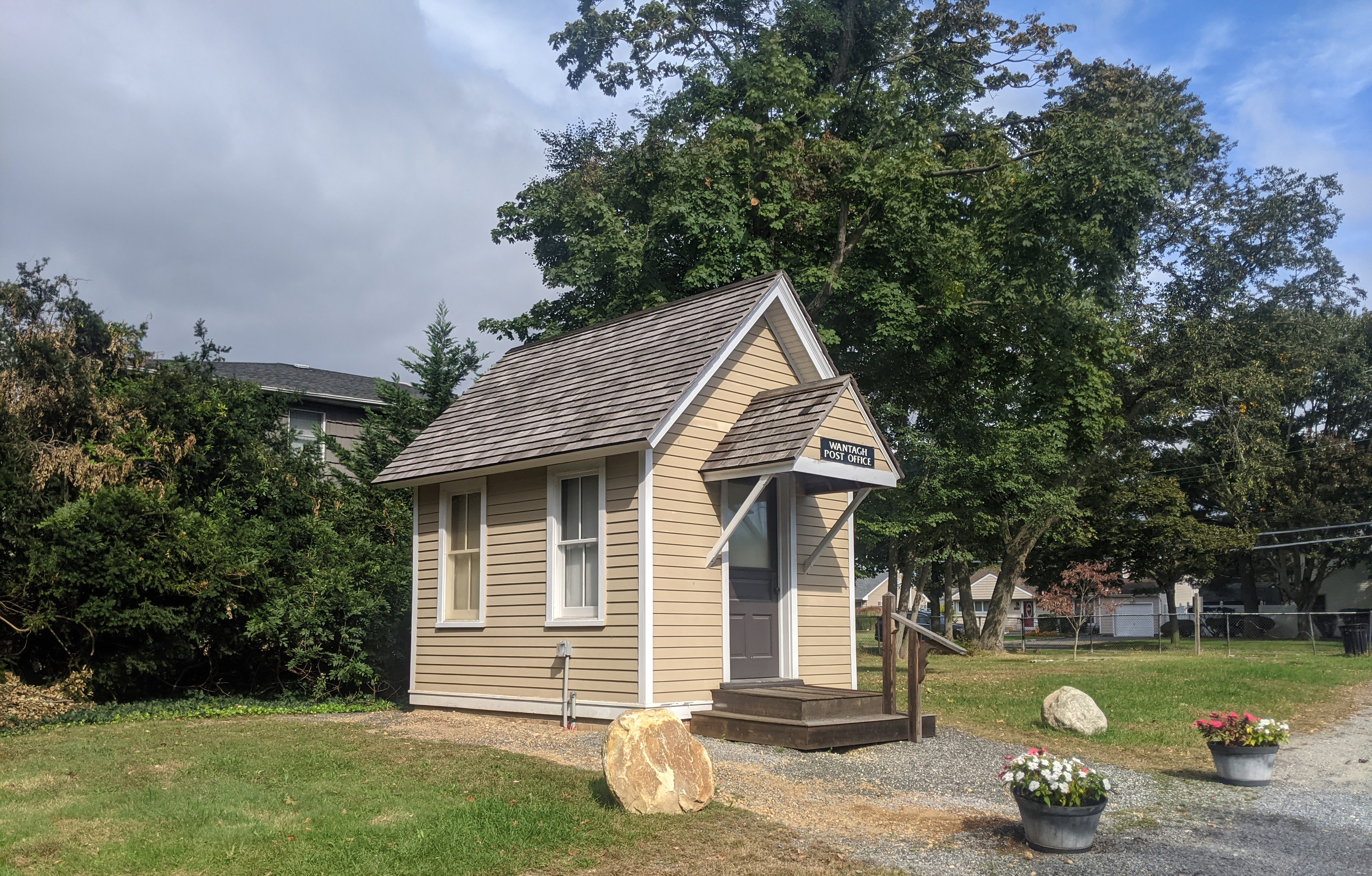
Original P.O.
