= Copiague station =

Long Island Rail Road station in Suffolk County, New York

Copiague
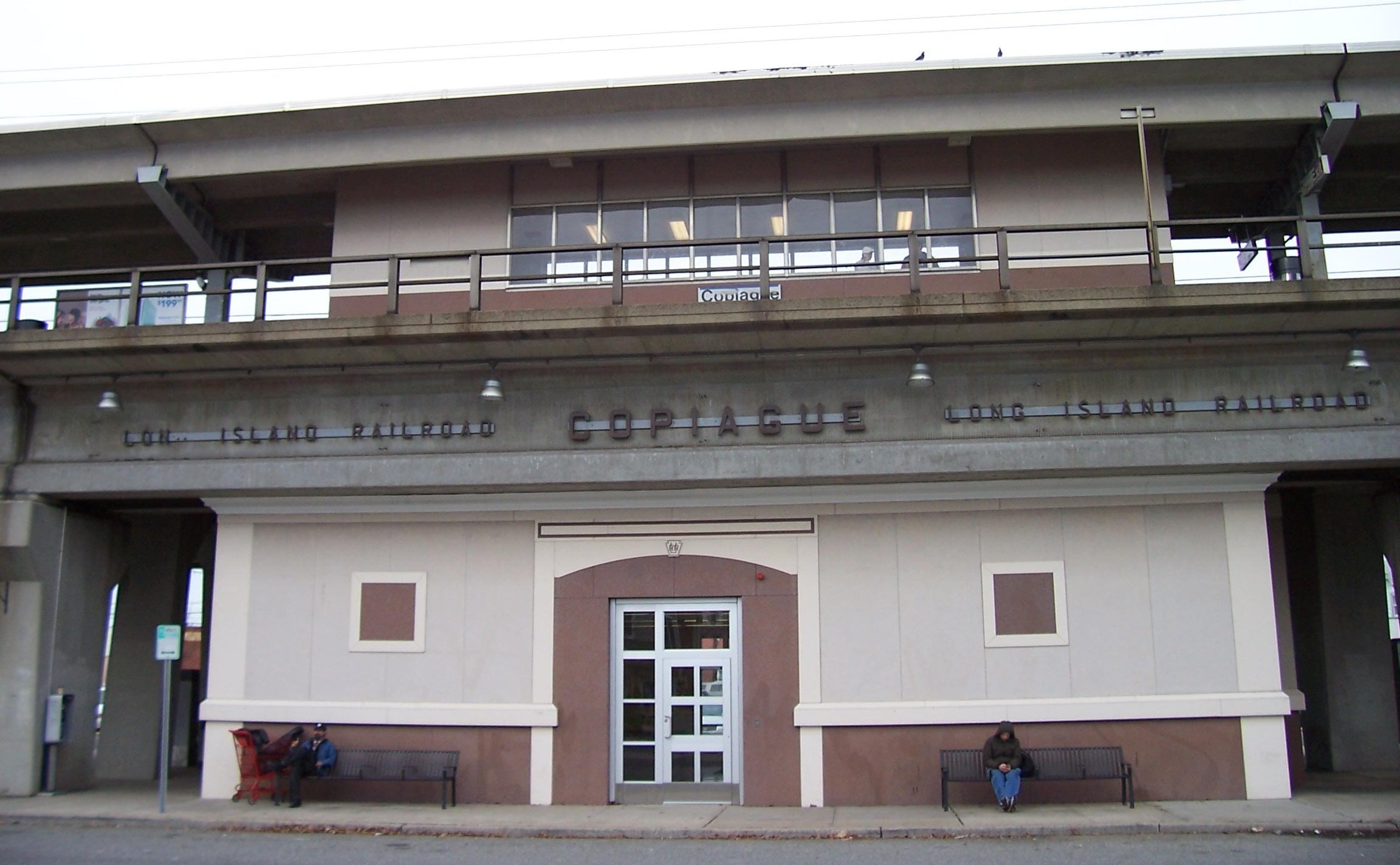
- The entrance to the Copiague station.

General information
- Location: Marconi Boulevard & Great Neck Road (CR 47); Copiague, New York
- Coordinates: 40.681°N 73.399°W
- Owner: Long Island Rail Road
- Line: Montauk Branch
- Platforms: 1 island platform
- Tracks: 2

Construction
- Parking: 747 spaces
- Cycle facilities: Yes
- Accessible: Yes

Other information
- Station code: CPG
- Fare zone: 9

History
- Opened: 1902
- Rebuilt: 1967–1973
- Electrified: May 20, 1925; 750 V (DC) third rail

Passengers
- 2012—2014: 2,629
- Rank: 41 of 125

Services
Preceding station	Long Island Rail Road	Following station
Amityville toward Penn Station, Grand Central or Atlantic Terminal	Babylon Branch	Lindenhurst toward Babylon
Montauk Branch does not stop here
Former services
Preceding station	Long Island Rail Road	Following station
Amityville toward Long Island City	Montauk Division	Lindenhurst toward Montauk
Location

Copiague is a station on the Babylon Branch of the Long Island Rail Road, located in Copiague, New York. The station is located on Marconi Boulevard and Great Neck Road (CR 47), one block north of Oak Street (CR 12).

== History ==
=== Original station ===
The South Side Railroad of Long Island and Central Railroad of Long Island once had another station in Copiague to the east called Belmont Junction, which was in service between 1873 and 1885. It is not known if the Long Island Rail Road built Copiague Station as a replacement for Belmont Junction, but it had served as one.

=== Current station ===
Copiague Station was originally built in 1902 and was rebuilt with temporary high-level platforms for the M1s on October 25, 1968. The original station was replaced with the current elevated station which opened on August 7, 1973. It is one of the few railroad stations along the Babylon Branch west of Patchogue that was not originally built by the South Side Railroad of Long Island.

In 2023, the MTA agreed to make the Amityville, Copiague, and Lindenhurst stations wheelchair-accessible to settle a lawsuit. An elevator at the Copiague station opened on May 16, 2024. This project brought the station into compliance with the Americans with Disabilities Act.

== Station layout ==
The station has one 10-car-long high-level island platform between the two tracks.
