= Unqua station =

Train station in New York, US (1880–82)

Unqua
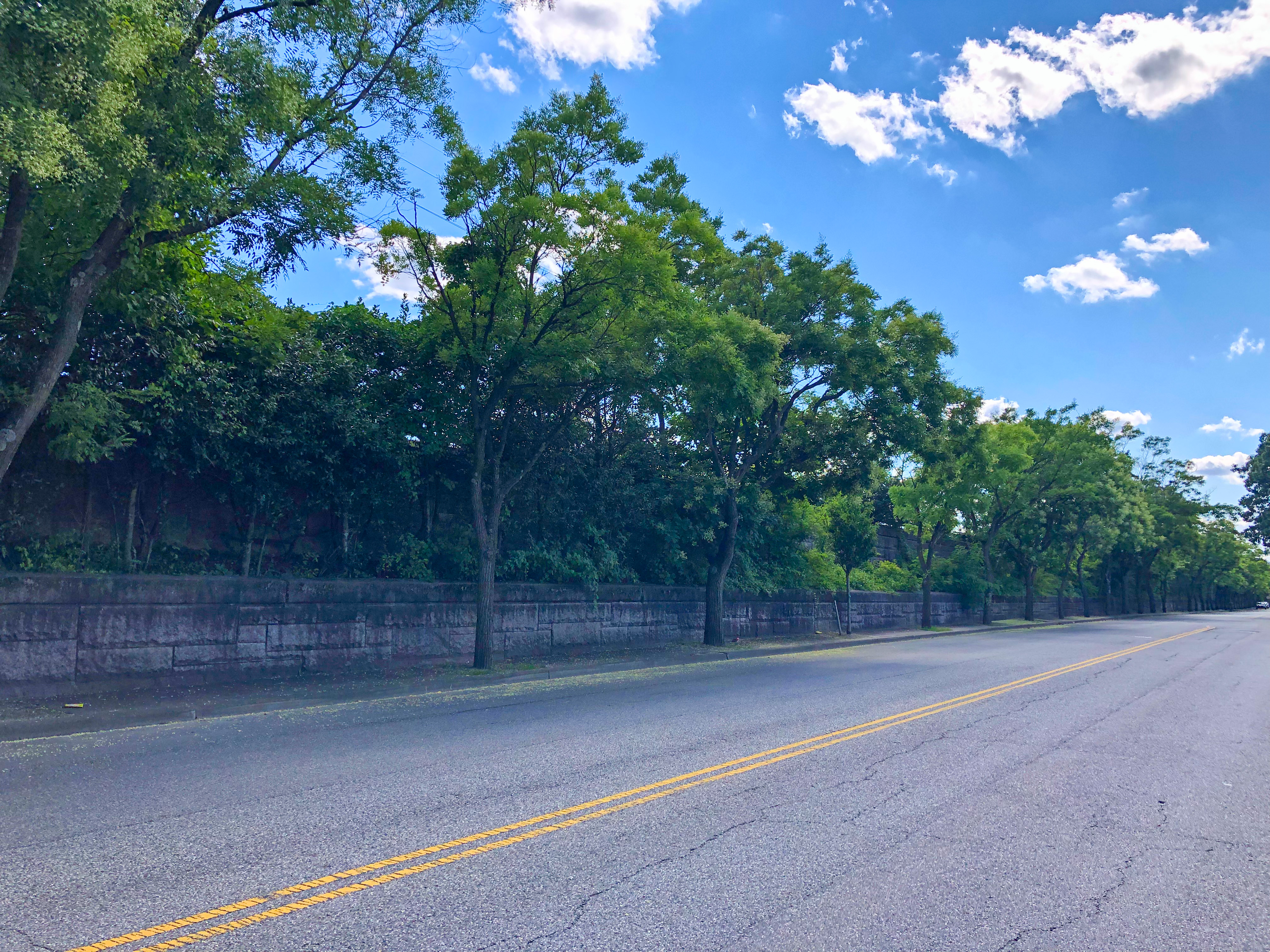
- Approximate location of Unqua Station

General information
- Location: Massapequa, New York
- Coordinates: 40.678°N 73.439°W
- Owner: Long Island Rail Road
- Line: Montauk Branch
- Platforms: 1 island platform
- Tracks: 2

History
- Opened: 1880
- Closed: c.1881–1882
- Rebuilt: No; Station abandoned
Location

Unqua was a Long Island Rail Road station located along the Montauk Branch in East Massapequa, New York and first appeared on employee timetables around 1880 and listed as a flag stop station after. It was located between the Massapequa and Amityville stations just east of Unqua Creek, and served a Brooklyn Water Supply pumping station. It seemed to disappear from issued timetables around 1881 or 1882. Freight service at the station however, appears to have existed as late as 1893.
