= Massapequa Park station =

Long Island Rail Road station in Nassau County, New York

Massapequa Park
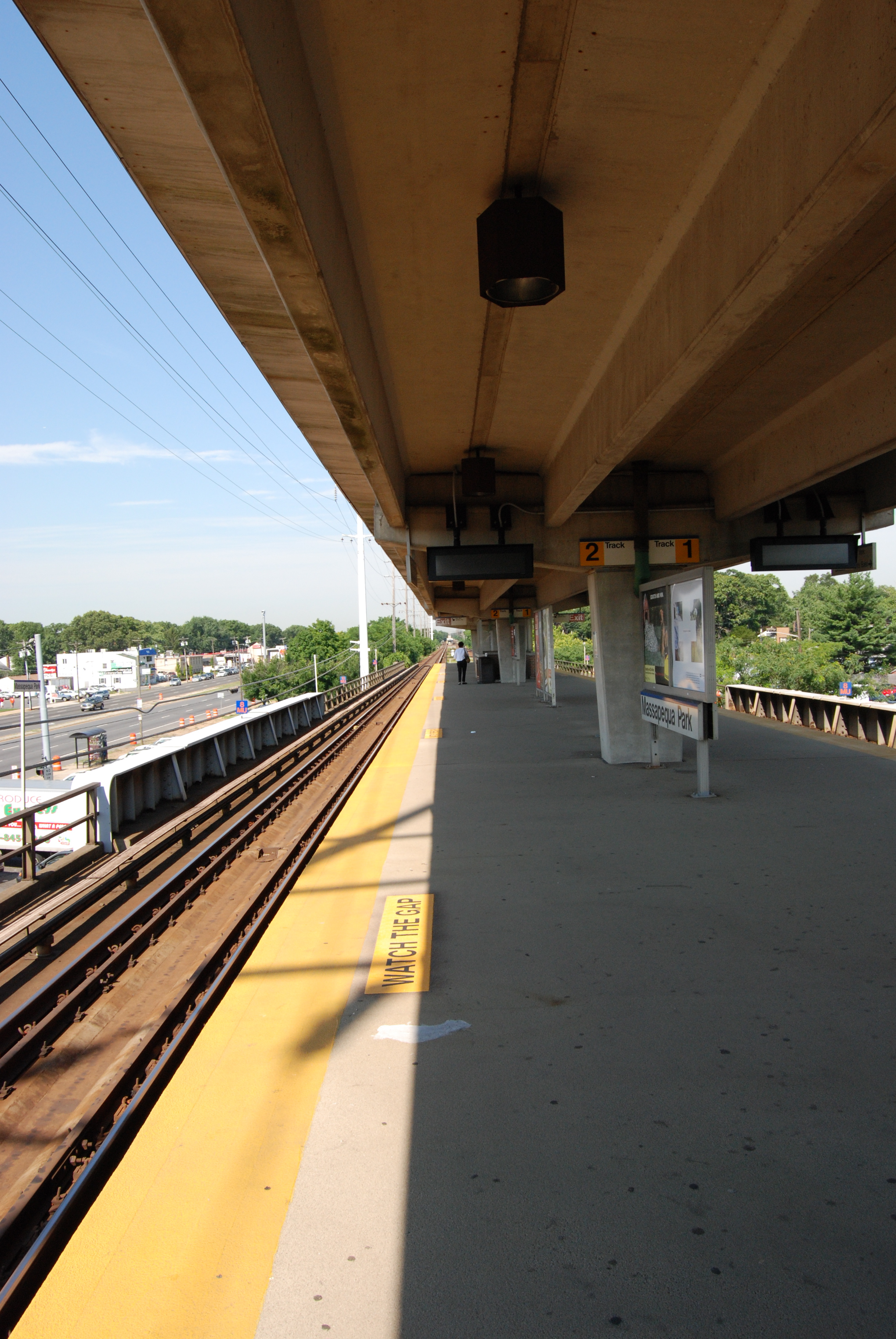
- The southern side of the station platform, looking west.

General information
- Location: Sunrise Highway & Park Boulevard; Massapequa Park, New York
- Coordinates: 40.677851°N 73.45474°W
- Owner: Long Island Rail Road
- Line: Montauk Branch
- Distance: 29.5 mi (47.5 km) from Long Island City
- Platforms: 1 island platform
- Tracks: 2
- Connections: Nassau Inter-County Express: n54, n55, n80

Construction
- Parking: Yes; with local permits
- Cycle facilities: Yes; Bike racks
- Accessible: Yes

Other information
- Station code: MPK
- Fare zone: 7

History
- Opened: December 2, 1933
- Rebuilt: 1966–1968 and 1977–1980
- Electrified: 750 V (DC) third rail

Passengers
- 2012—2014: 3,827
- Rank: 30 of 125

Services
Preceding station	Long Island Rail Road	Following station
Massapequa toward Penn Station, Grand Central or Atlantic Terminal	Babylon Branch	Amityville toward Babylon
Montauk Branch does not stop here
Former services
Preceding station	Long Island Rail Road	Following station
Massapequa toward Long Island City	Montauk Division	Amityville toward Montauk
Location

The Massapequa Park station is a station on the Babylon Branch of the Long Island Rail Road. It is officially located on New York State Route 27 and Park Boulevard in Massapequa Park, New York, although there are parking lots along Front Street and north of the station. All parking lots require Village of Massapequa Park residential permits.

== History ==
The station is typical of the elevated Babylon Branch stations that were rebuilt during the mid-to-late 20th century. The station originally opened as a platformed shelter on December 2, 1933, east of Massapequa station where Robert Moses wanted to extend the Bethpage State Parkway. It was replaced in 1966 by a temporary station, then in 1968 it received high platforms for the M1. A new temporary station was built to the south of the old one in December 1977 for the grade crossing elimination project. The current elevated station opened on December 13, 1980, making it the last station to be elevated along the Babylon Branch.

In January 2022, the MTA announced that it would add a project to make Massapequa Park station ADA-accessible in the 2020–2024 Capital Program. On October 18th, 2024, the elevator in Massapequa Park was installed, making it ADA compliant.

== Station layout ==
The station has one 12-car-long high-level island platform between the two tracks.
