= Merrick station =

Long Island Rail Road station in Nassau County, New York

Merrick
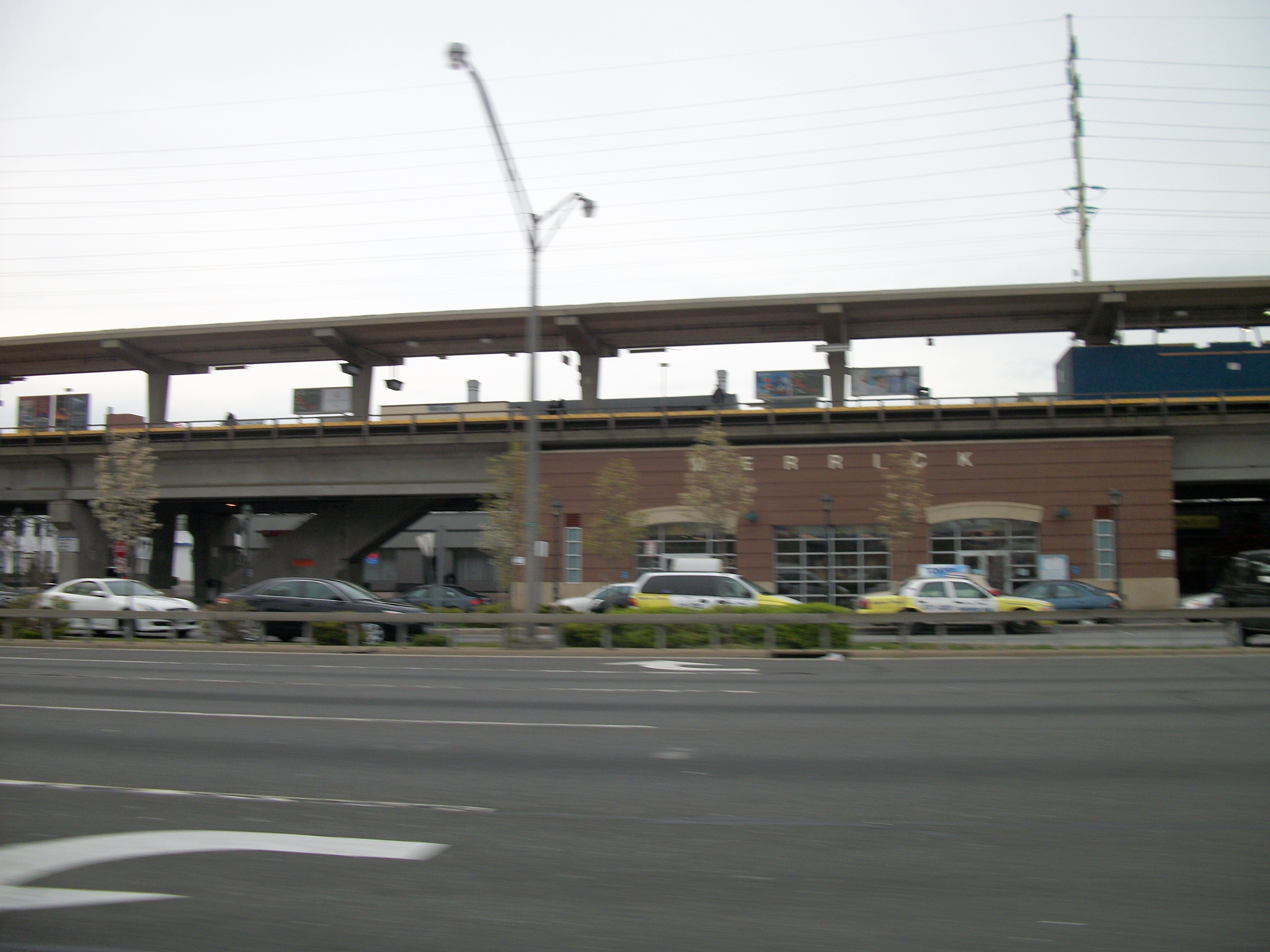
- Merrick station as seen from Sunrise Highway.

General information
- Location: Sunrise Highway between Hewlett & Merrick Avenues; Merrick, New York
- Coordinates: 40.663769°N 73.550709°W
- Owner: Long Island Rail Road
- Line: Montauk Branch
- Distance: 24.1 mi (38.8 km) from Long Island City
- Platforms: 1 island platform
- Tracks: 2
- Connections: Nassau Inter-County Express: n19X

Construction
- Parking: Yes
- Cycle facilities: Yes
- Accessible: Yes

Other information
- Station code: MRK
- Fare zone: 7

History
- Opened: 1867; 159 years ago (SSRRLI)
- Rebuilt: 1885, 1902, 1969–1975
- Electrified: May 20, 1925; 750 V (DC) third rail

Passengers
- 2012—2014: 7,235 per weekday
- Rank: 14 of 125

Services
Preceding station	Long Island Rail Road	Following station
Freeport toward Penn Station, Grand Central or Atlantic Terminal	Babylon Branch	Bellmore toward Babylon
Montauk Branch does not stop here
Former services
Preceding station	Long Island Rail Road	Following station
Freeport toward Long Island City	Montauk Division	Bellmore toward Montauk
Location

Merrick is a station on the Babylon Branch of the Long Island Rail Road. It is officially located on Sunrise Highway, between Hewlett Avenue and Merrick Avenue, in Merrick, New York. However, the parking areas for the station expand well beyond the given location.

== History ==
Merrick station is typical of the elevated Babylon Branch stations that were rebuilt during the mid-to-late 20th century. The station was originally built on October 28, 1867, by the South Side Railroad of Long Island, but in 1869, it was expanded into a hotel built by SSRRLI President Charles Fox. This hotel was burned to the ground in 1908. A second depot was built in 1885, and a third in 1902. The station was razed in June 1969 as part of the grade-crossing elimination project. A temporary station was installed on December 4, 1970, but the elevated fourth station was not opened until June 28, 1975.

== Station layout ==
This station has one 12-car-long high-level island platform serving trains in both directions. A 10-car-long awning exists, with the easternmost part of the platform uncovered. The rail line has two tracks at this location. Each Fall, this railroad station along with Bellmore station plays host to a Street Festival/Fair courtesy of the Merrick Chamber of Commerce.

Merrick station is home to a memorial to Roxey (d. 1914), a dog who frequented the LIRR in the early 20th century and became a mascot for the commuters and staff. The small gravestone is located on the south side of the station, along the guardrail separating the parking lot from the Sunrise Highway, in a patch of lawn about 20 feet east of Merrick Avenue.
