= Amityville station =

Long Island Rail Road station in Suffolk County, New York

Amityville
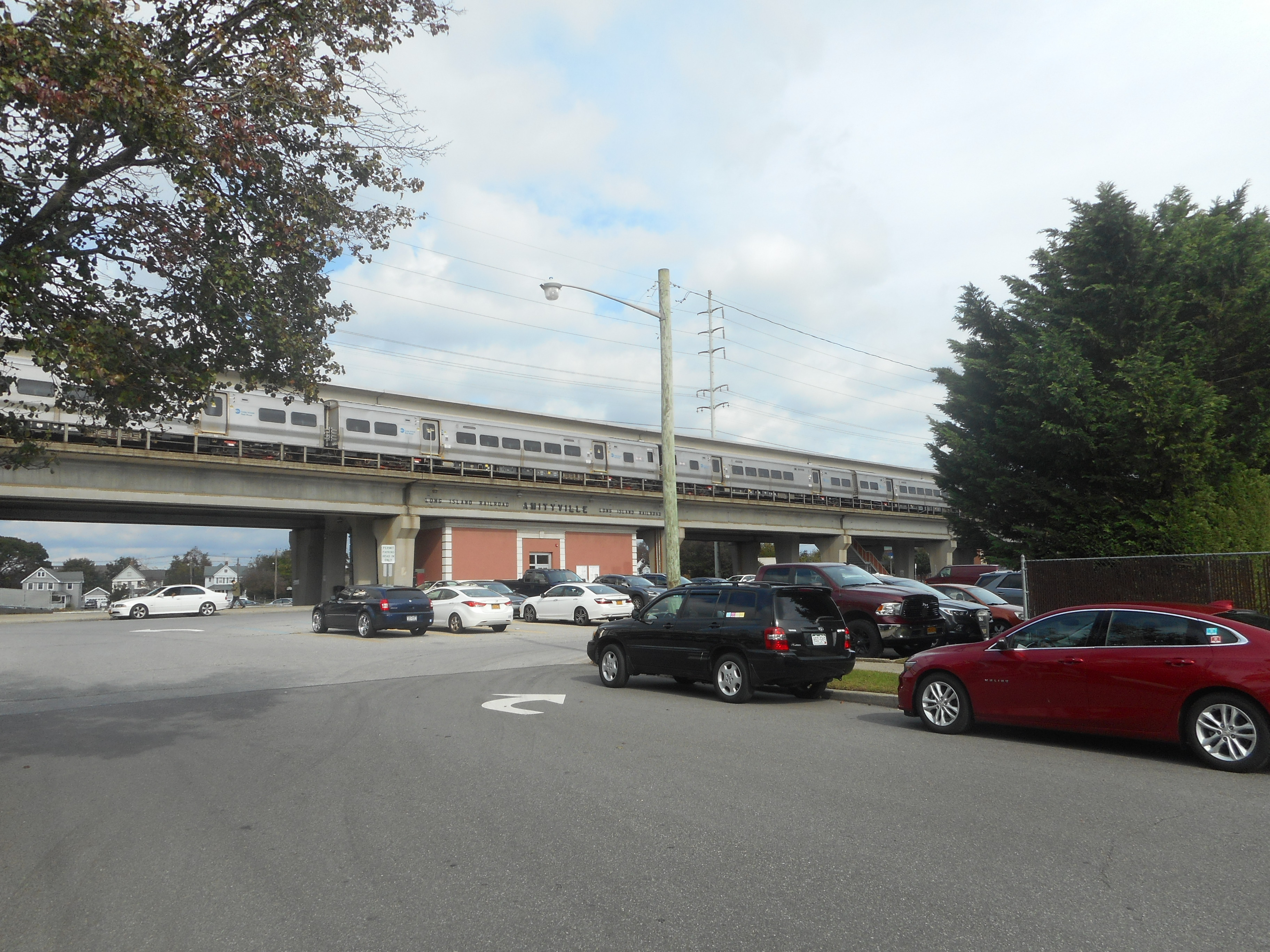
- The Amityville station in 2018, prior to ADA accessibility upgrades

General information
- Location: John Street between Sterling Place & Oak Street; Amityville, New York
- Coordinates: 40.680263°N 73.420472°W
- Owner: Long Island Rail Road
- Line: Montauk Branch
- Platforms: 1 island platform
- Tracks: 2
- Connections: Suffolk County Transit: 1, 2, 4, 10 Nassau Inter-County Express: n54, n55, n71

Construction
- Parking: Yes
- Cycle facilities: Yes
- Accessible: Yes

Other information
- Station code: AVL
- Fare zone: 9

History
- Opened: 1868 (SSRRLI)
- Rebuilt: 1889, 1964, 1968–1973
- Electrified: May 20, 1925; 750 V (DC) third rail

Passengers
- 2012—2014: 2,607
- Rank: 42 of 125

Services
| Preceding station | Long Island Rail Road | Following station |
|---|---|---|
| Massapequa Park toward Penn Station, Grand Central or Atlantic Terminal | Babylon Branch | Copiague toward Babylon |
Montauk Branch does not stop here
Former services
| Preceding station | Long Island Rail Road | Following station |
|---|---|---|
| Massapequa Park toward Long Island City | Montauk Division | Copiague toward Montauk |
Location

Amityville is a station on the Babylon Branch of the Long Island Rail Road within the Incorporated Village of Amityville in Suffolk County, New York, United States. It is located on John Street between Sunrise Highway (NY 27) and NY 27A, west of NY 110 – and is the westernmost station on the Babylon Branch within Suffolk County.

== History ==
Amityville station is typical of the elevated Babylon Branch stations that were rebuilt during the mid-to-late 20th century. It was originally built in 1868 by the South Side Railroad of Long Island, then replaced by a brick station in 1889. From 1890 to 1919, it was a stop for the Huntington Railroad cross-island trolley line, which included a bridge over the tracks on the west side of the station. It was also the terminus of the Amityville Line for of the Babylon Railroad trolley line from 1910 to 1920. When the trolleys were abandoned the cross-island trolley bridge over the tracks became a pedestrian crossover. The station building was completely demolished in 1964 and on October 25, 1968, a temporary station building was opened with high-level side platforms to accommodate the new M1 cars and facilitate the construction of the new grade separated Babylon Branch. The new elevated structure was opened on August 7, 1973. The 1868 station remains standing as a private residence. Amityville is also the site of the first interlocking after the Central Branch splits from the Babylon Branch.

In 2023, the MTA agreed to make the Amityville, Copiague and Lindenhurst stations wheelchair-accessible to settle a lawsuit. The elevator at Amityville was completed and opened on June 28th, 2024.

== Station layout ==
The station has one 10-car-long high-level island platform between the two tracks. Twelve-car trains do not open the doors of the last two cars westbound or first two cars eastbound.
