= Bellmore station =

Long Island Rail Road station in Nassau County, New York

Bellmore
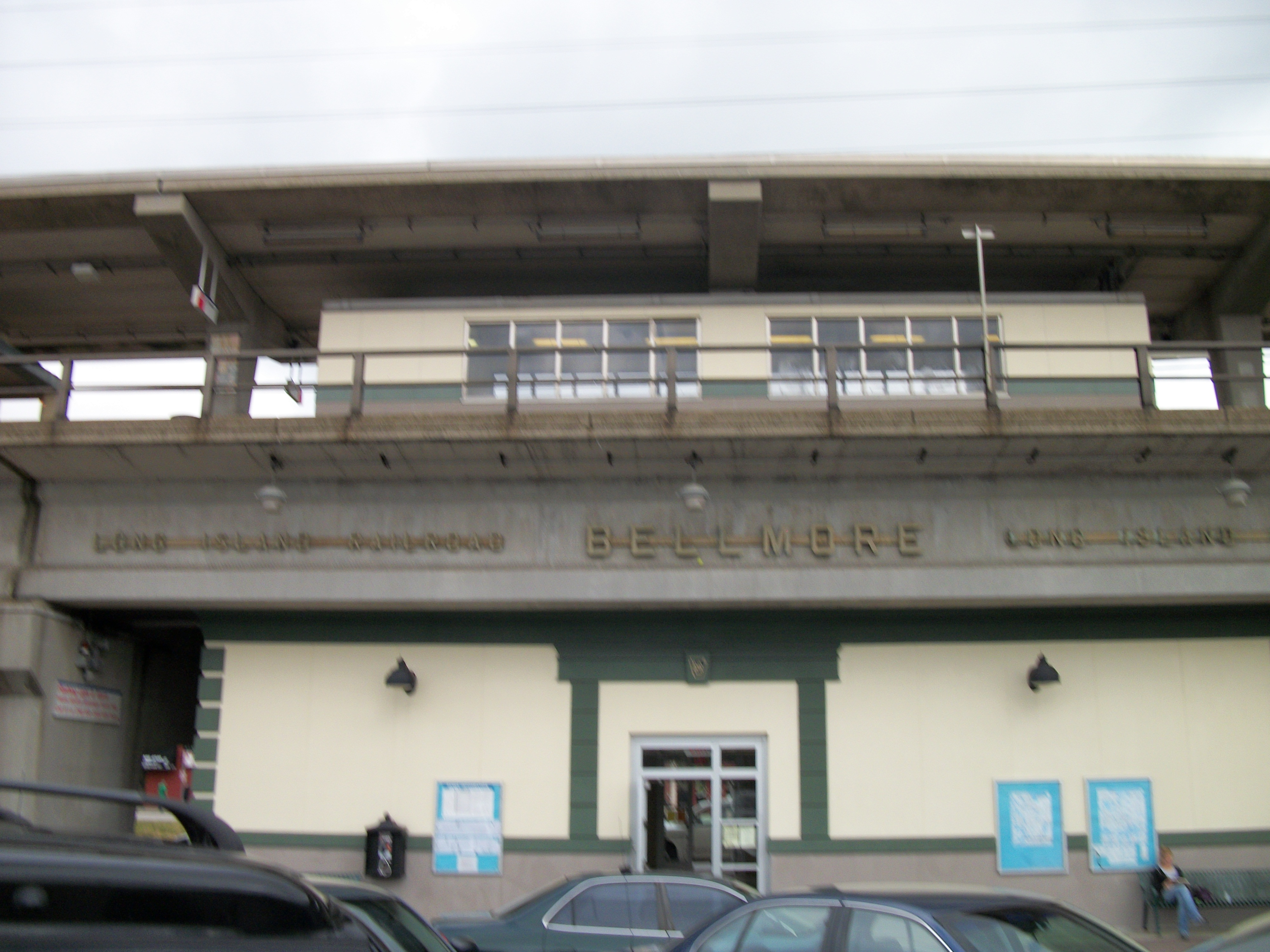
- The south side of Bellmore station from the parking lot

General information
- Location: Sunrise Highway between Bedford & Center Avenues; Bellmore, New York
- Coordinates: 40.668766°N 73.528833°W
- Owner: Long Island Rail Road
- Line: Montauk Branch
- Distance: 25.6 mi (41.2 km) from Long Island City
- Platforms: 1 island platform
- Tracks: 2
- Connections: Nassau Inter-County Express: n19X

Construction
- Parking: Yes
- Cycle facilities: Yes
- Accessible: Yes

Other information
- Station code: BMR
- Fare zone: 7

History
- Opened: October 1869; 157 years ago (SSRRLI)
- Rebuilt: 1968–1975
- Electrified: May 20, 1925; 750 V (DC) third rail

Passengers
- 2012—2014: 6,964
- Rank: 16 of 125

Services
Preceding station	Long Island Rail Road	Following station
Merrick toward Penn Station, Grand Central or Atlantic Terminal	Babylon Branch	Wantagh toward Babylon
Montauk Branch does not stop here
Former services
Preceding station	Long Island Rail Road	Following station
Merrick toward Long Island City	Montauk Division	Wantagh toward Montauk
Location

Bellmore is a station on the Babylon Branch of the Long Island Rail Road. It is located on the north side of Sunrise Highway between Bedford and Centre Avenues in Bellmore, New York, however the actual land area occupied by the station's several parking lots begins west of Centre Avenue and continues east of Bellmore Avenue.

== History ==
Bellmore station was established by the South Side Railroad of Long Island in October 1869, and the original structure was replaced sometime in the early-20th century. As with many other ground-level stations along the Babylon Branch in Nassau and Western Suffolk counties which had been elevated during the 1950s and 1960s, preliminary work began on February 18, 1968, to raise the tracks in Bellmore. Like Merrick station, temporary facilities containing a ticket window and a waiting room opened on December 4, 1970, but the elevated station wasn't completed until June 28, 1975.

The small structure occupying the grassy island on the north side of the station's waiting room began as an open shelter for LIRR customers waiting for eastbound trains. Constructed at the same time as the early-1900s station, it had been located on the south side of the grade-level tracks, just west of Bedford Avenue. At one point, it was partially enclosed, and became the dispatch office for Bellmore Taxi. When the tracks were elevated, the cab company moved its facilities to a storefront on Pettit Avenue, and the shelter was relocated to preserve it from the destruction which saw the demise of the old station itself. After many years of neglect, it was renovated and further enclosed to its present condition. The Bellmore Historical Society has occupied the small building for the past several years, making its treasury of antique photographs and historical artifacts available to school groups as well as to visitors to the annual Bellmore Family Street Festival hosted each fall by the Bellmore Chamber of Commerce.

== Station layout ==
The station has one 14-car-long high-level island platform between the two tracks.
