= Seaford station (LIRR) =

Long Island Rail Road station in Nassau County, New York

Seaford
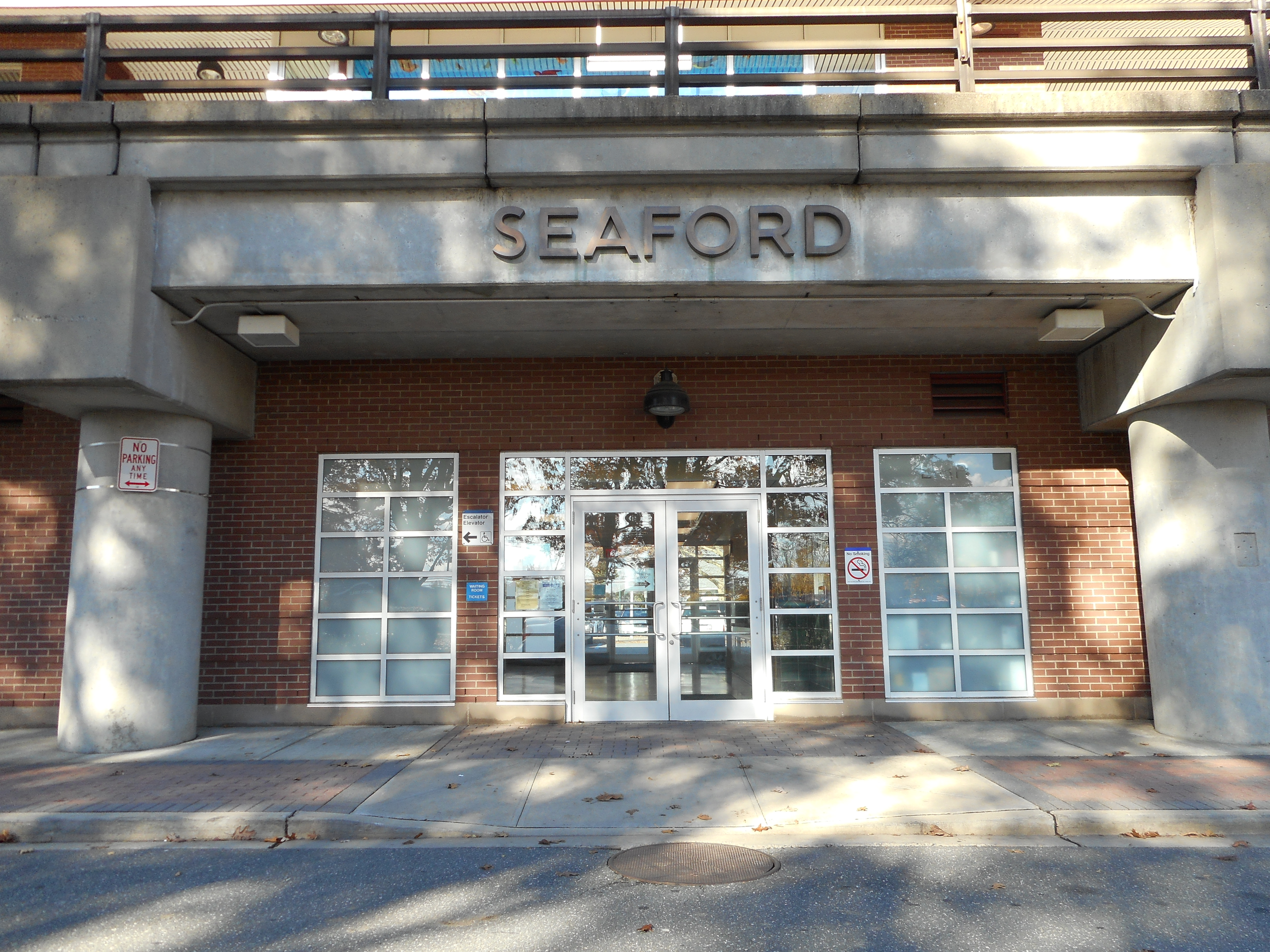
- Entrance to the Seaford station's station house, at ground level, beneath the tracks and platform

General information
- Location: Sunrise Highway & Jackson Avenue; Seaford, New York
- Coordinates: 40.67573°N 73.486454°W
- Owner: Long Island Rail Road
- Line: Montauk Branch
- Distance: 27.7 mi (44.6 km) from Long Island City
- Platforms: 1 island platform
- Tracks: 2
- Connections: Nassau Inter-County Express: n54

Construction
- Parking: Yes
- Cycle facilities: Yes
- Accessible: Yes

Other information
- Station code: SFD
- Fare zone: 7

History
- Opened: May 26, 1899; 127 years ago
- Rebuilt: 1966–1967, 2007–2009
- Electrified: May 20, 1925; 750 V (DC) third rail

Passengers
- 2012–2014: 3,796 per weekday
- Rank: 32 of 125

Services
Preceding station	Long Island Rail Road	Following station
Wantagh toward Penn Station, Grand Central or Atlantic Terminal	Babylon Branch	Massapequa toward Babylon
Montauk Branch does not stop here
Former services
Preceding station	Long Island Rail Road	Following station
Wantagh toward Long Island City	Montauk Division	Massapequa toward Montauk
Location

Seaford is a station on the Babylon Branch of the Long Island Rail Road. It is located at the intersection of Sunrise Highway (NY 27) and Jackson Avenue in Seaford, New York – although parking areas stretch beyond Washington Avenue east of this corner, and west towards the interchange with the Seaford–Oyster Bay Expressway (NY 135).

Westbound trains serving the Seaford station typically terminate at Penn Station or Grand Central, and eastbound trains terminate at Massapequa or Babylon.

== History ==
Seaford station was opened as a ground-level station on May 26, 1899. It was raised on April 15, 1966 as part of a major grade crossing elimination project along the Babylon Branch, which was constructed and completed in 1966–67.

The station is typical of the elevated Babylon Branch stations that were rebuilt during the mid-to-late 20th century, as part of the grade crossing elimination project. What makes it atypical, however, is its close proximity to the Seaford–Oyster Bay Expressway (NY 135) interchange. The station was opened as a ground-level station on May 26, 1899. It was raised on April 15, 1966 as part of the grade elimination project, which was constructed and completed in 1966–67.

Beginning in 2008 the station underwent another renovation, with complete rebuilding of the station's platforms and shelters, plus the installation of an elevator to make the station compliant with the Americans with Disabilities Act of 1990. Artwork would also be installed, as part of the MTA's Arts for Transit program. Though the reconstruction was scheduled to be completed on January 1, 2010, it was finished by July 31, 2009, several months ahead of schedule.

== Station layout ==
The station has one 12-car-long high-level island platform between the two tracks.
