= Massapequa station =

Long Island Rail Road station in Nassau County, New York

Massapequa
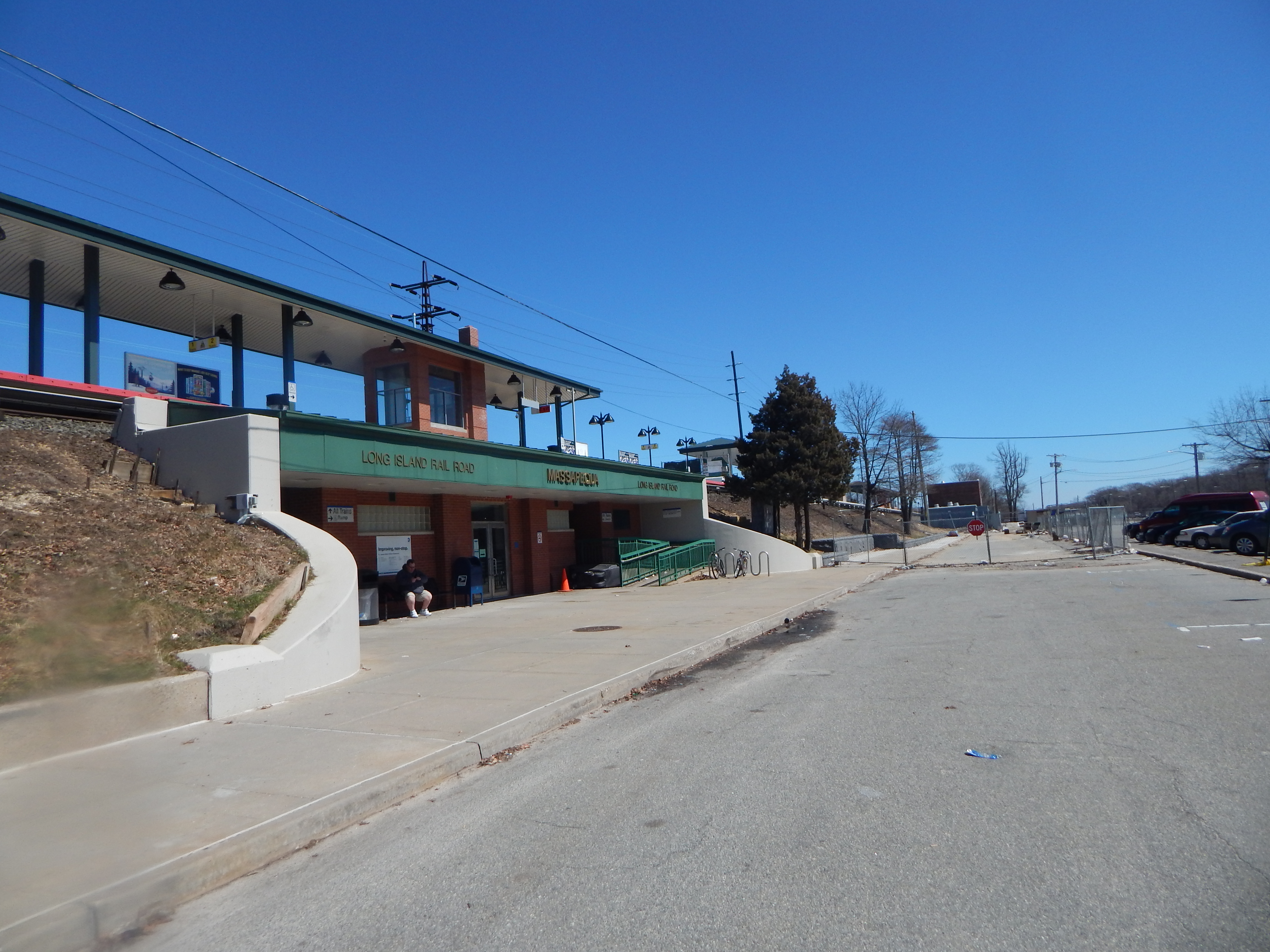
- Massapequa station entrance from the parking lot, alongside NY 27 in March 2015.

General information
- Location: Sunrise Highway & Broadway; Massapequa, New York
- Coordinates: 40.676901°N 73.469052°W
- Owner: Long Island Rail Road
- Line: Montauk Branch
- Distance: 28.7 mi (46.2 km) from Long Island City
- Platforms: 1 island platform
- Tracks: 2
- Connections: Nassau Inter-County Express: n54, n55, n80

Construction
- Parking: Yes
- Cycle facilities: Yes; Bike rack and locker
- Accessible: yes

Other information
- Station code: MQA
- Fare zone: 7

History
- Opened: October 26, 1867 (SSRRLI)
- Rebuilt: 1891, 1953, 2013-2015, 2021
- Electrified: May 20, 1925; 750 V (DC) third rail
- Former names: South Oyster Bay (1867–1889)

Passengers
- 2012—2014: 4,768 per weekday
- Rank: 24 of 125

Services
Preceding station	Long Island Rail Road	Following station
Seaford toward Penn Station, Grand Central or Atlantic Terminal	Babylon Branch	Massapequa Park toward Babylon
Montauk Branch does not stop here
Former services
Preceding station	Long Island Rail Road	Following station
Seaford toward Long Island City	Montauk Division	Massapequa Park toward Montauk
Location

Massapequa is a station along the Long Island Rail Road's Montauk Branch in Massapequa, New York, serving Babylon Branch trains. It is located on Sunrise Highway east of Broadway and NY 107 and parking lots are located far beyond its given location. Some off-peak and weekend Babylon Branch trains begin or end their runs at this station.

== History ==
=== Early history ===
Massapequa station is typical of the elevated Babylon Branch stations that were rebuilt during the mid-to-late 20th century. It was originally built by the South Side Railroad of Long Island on October 28, 1867 as South Oyster Bay station, until May 1889. The second relocated depot was built May–June 1891, and razed in January 1953 as part of the grade elimination project of the post-war era. A temporary station was relocated west of the former location on January 12, 1953, and the current elevated structure entered service between December 14–18, 1953.

=== Recent improvements ===
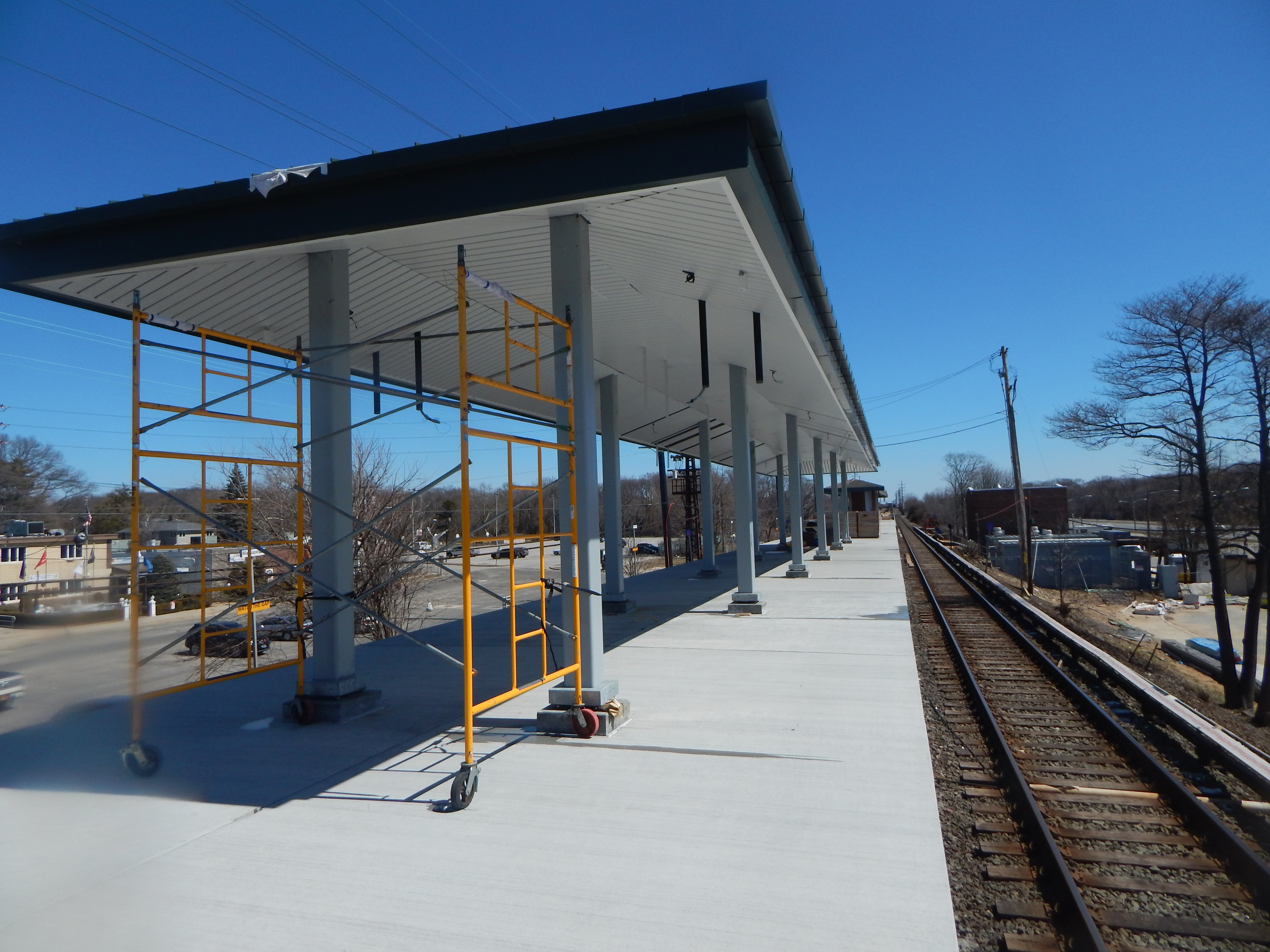
The Massapequa station eastern half under construction in March 2015

==== Platform rehabilitation project ====
In Spring 2013 the LIRR began work on the Massapequa Station Platform Rehabilitation Project, to replace the station's aging platform structure, platform canopy, elevator, escalator, platform waiting room, and the pedestrian bridge over Broadway. The project was estimated to cost the MTA $20 million, and was completed in the Summer of 2015.

==== Pocket track ====
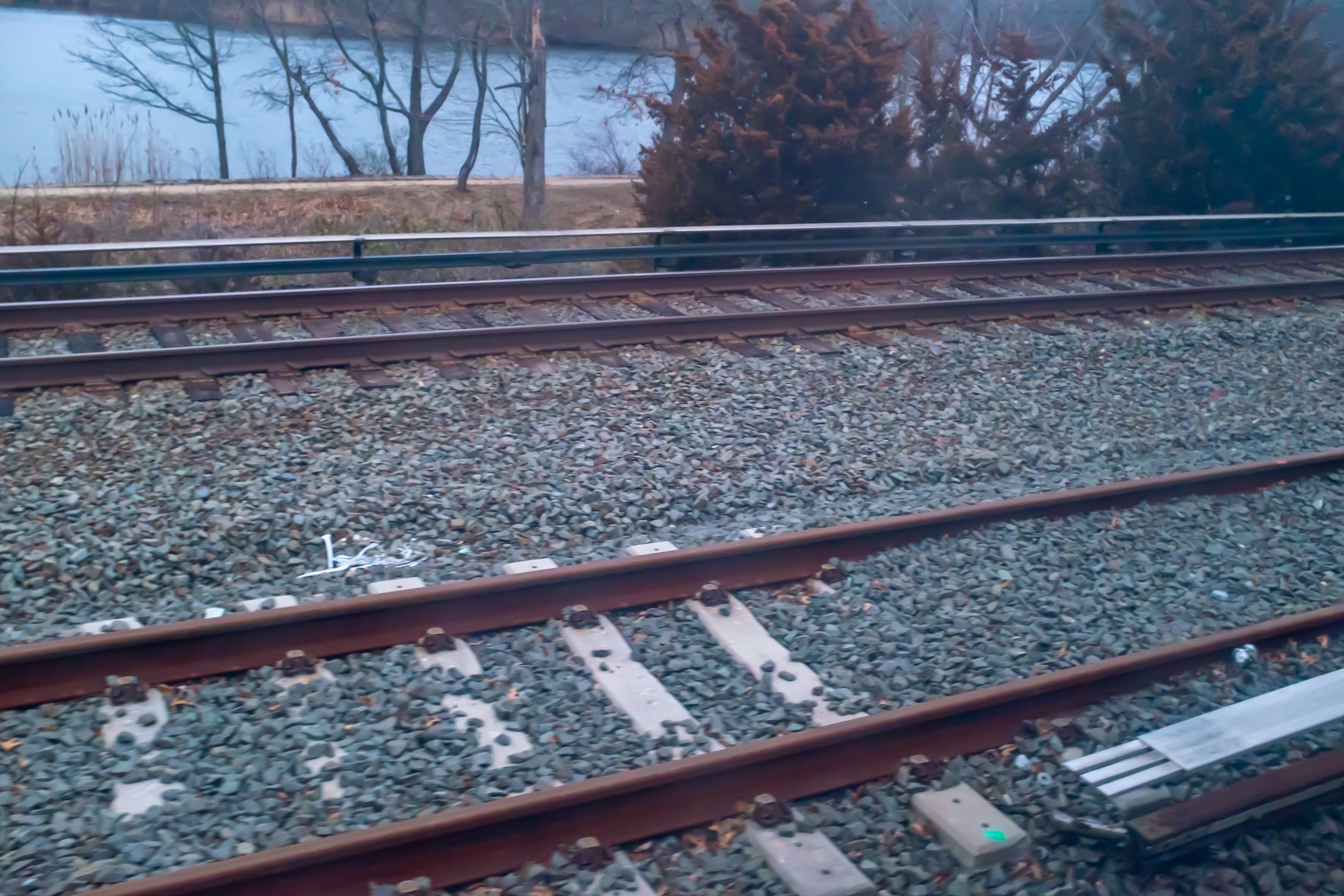
Massapequa Pocket Track (foreground), seen from eastbound train. Note incomplete installation of the third rail.

The LIRR installed a pocket track east of the Massapequa station. The pocket track, which is used for turning trains that begin or end their trips at Massapequa Station, was installed east of the station, in the middle of the two Babylon Branch tracks that are platform-width apart at this point.

The pocket track is 1,700 feet (520 m) long, enough to fit a full 12-car train. The project cost $19.6 million. Construction of the pocket track began in 2014. The project was originally projected to be completed by November 2015, though was delayed until April 2019; it was eventually completed in 2021.

== Station layout ==
The station has one 12-car-long high-level island platform between the two tracks. It is the only Babylon Branch station that does not sit atop a concrete viaduct; instead it sits on top of a grassy embankment similar to Westbury.
