= List of Long Island Rail Road stations =

Schematic diagram of Long Island Rail Road services and stations

The Long Island Rail Road (LIRR) is a commuter railway system serving all four counties of Long Island, with two stations in the Manhattan borough of New York City in the U.S. state of New York. Its operator is the Metropolitan Transportation Authority of New York. Serving 301,763 passengers per day as of 2007 and 88.5 million riders for the year of 2008, it is the busiest commuter railroad in the United States. With 324 passenger route-miles, it spans Long Island from Atlantic Terminal in Brooklyn to Montauk station at the tip of the southern fork. Pennsylvania Station in Manhattan is the actual westernmost station of the Long Island Rail Road and its busiest station.

The system currently has 126 stations on eleven rail lines called "branches". (Not included in this count are two additional stations that serve employees of the LIRR: Hillside Facility and Boland's Landing). Several stations see part-time service: Belmont Park, open on event days such as Belmont Stakes; Pinelawn, which exclusively serves cemeteries in its area and is served only during off-peak daytime hours; and Hunterspoint Avenue and Long Island City, which serve as terminals for several diesel trains during rush hours. The six stations on the Main Line east of Ronkonkoma also see very limited week-round trains, and are often used for recreation rather than commuting. Jamaica is a major transfer station between branches, as it provides the interchange from the eastern Long Island stations to the western New York terminals and vice versa. Other inter-branch transfer stations include Woodside, Mineola, Hicksville, Valley Stream, Lynbrook and Babylon. The Huntington, Ronkonkoma and Babylon stations provide transfers between electric train service and diesel train service within their respective branches, the Port Jefferson, Ronkonkoma/Greenport and Babylon/Montauk branches.

== Lines ==
This list shows the western and eastern terminals of each LIRR service. There are 10 total services, plus one additional seasonal service (the Belmont Park Branch). Jamaica and the two employees-only stations are not included in the station counts below.

Line	Stations	Western terminal	Eastern terminal
Babylon Branch	13	Rockville Centre	Babylon
Belmont Park Branch	1	Belmont Park (seasonal service only)	
City Terminal Zone	12	Penn Station; Long Island City; Atlantic Terminal; Grand Central Madison	Jamaica
Far Rockaway Branch	11	Locust Manor	Far Rockaway
Hempstead Branch	9	Hollis	Hempstead
Long Beach Branch	6	Lynbrook	Long Beach
Montauk Branch	16	Babylon (Note: The Montauk Branch line is distinct from the Montauk Branch service. Babylon Branch trains run via the Montauk Branch east of Jamaica, but Montauk Branch service on the line begins at Babylon.)	Patchogue / Montauk
Oyster Bay Branch	10	East Williston	Oyster Bay
Port Jefferson Branch	16	New Hyde Park	Huntington (electric) / Port Jefferson (diesel)
Port Washington Branch	13	Woodside	Port Washington
Ronkonkoma Branch	14	Bethpage	Ronkonkoma (electric) / Greenport (diesel)
West Hempstead Branch	6	St. Albans	West Hempstead

=== Trunk lines ===
The LIRR has three trunk lines; each branch begins eastbound trips out of New York City via one of these lines.

Trunk line	Stations	Western terminal	Eastern terminal	Branches
Atlantic Branch	8	Atlantic Terminal	Valley Stream	City Terminal Zone; Far Rockaway Branch; Long Beach Branch
Main Line	29	Penn Station or Grand Central Madison	Greenport	City Terminal Zone; Belmont Park Branch; Hempstead Branch; Oyster Bay Branch; Port Jefferson Branch; Port Washington Branch; Ronkonkoma Branch
Montauk Branch	33	Long Island City	Montauk	West Hempstead Branch; Babylon Branch; Montauk Branch

== Station types and designs ==
The Long Island Rail Road has four types of station designs:

- Ground level (most common, platforms accessible via ramps and/or staircases)
- Elevated (all Babylon Branch stations and select others)
- Open-cut (select Port Washington Branch stations)
- Underground (only Penn Station, Atlantic Terminal, and Grand Central terminal)
The Various Station Types Across the LIRR Network:

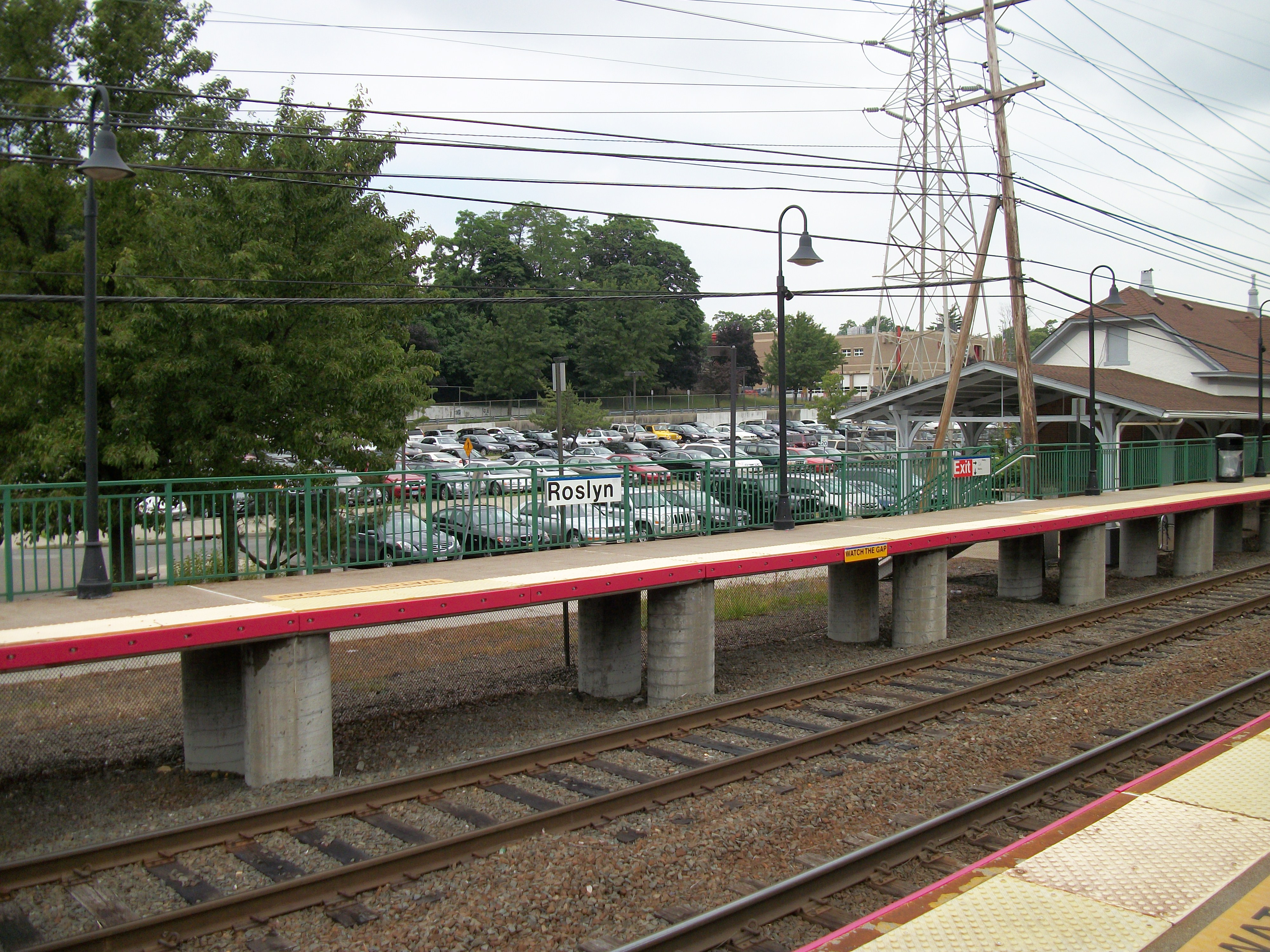
Roslyn is an example of a ground level LIRR station.

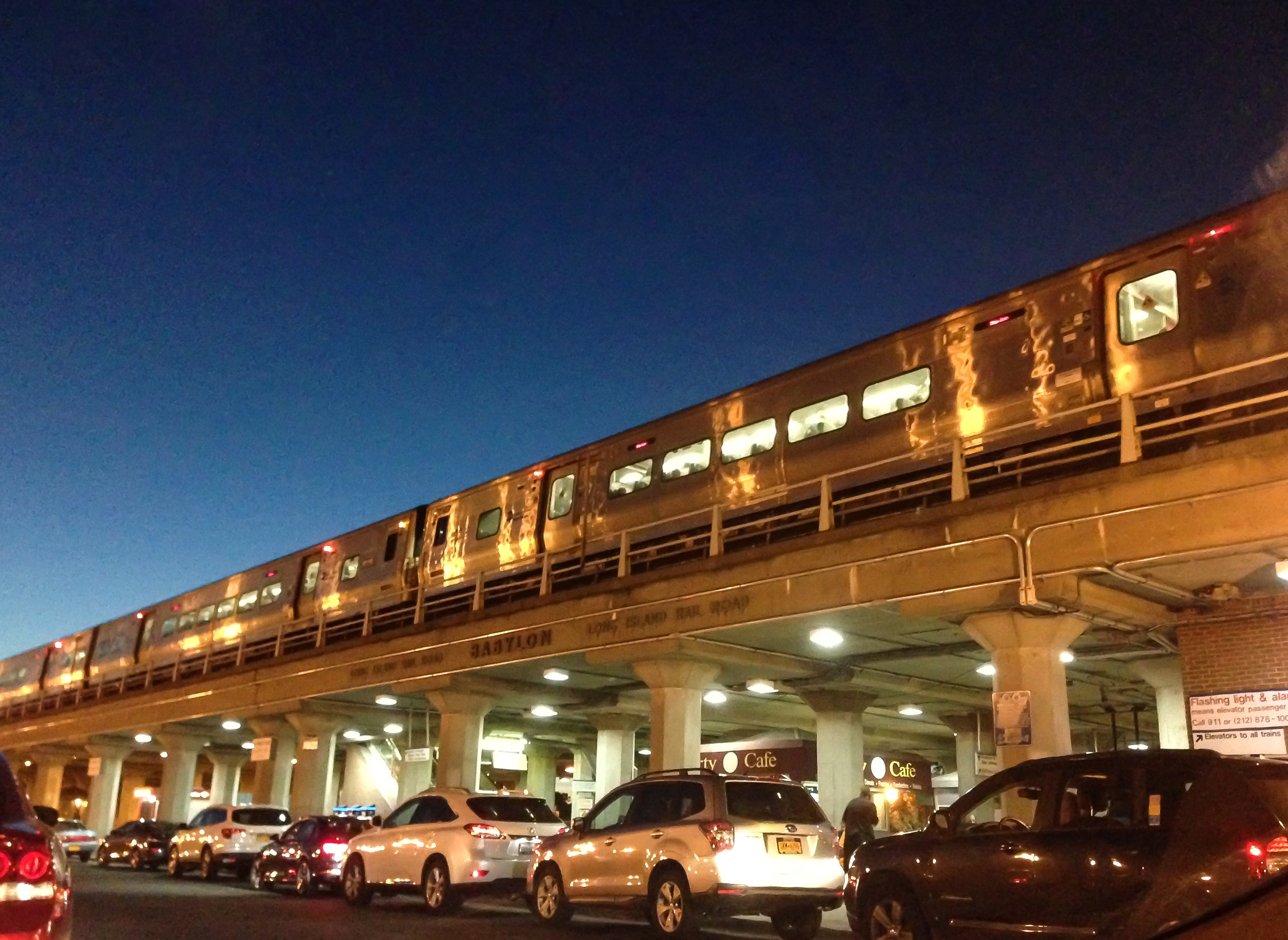
Babylon is an example of an elevated LIRR station.

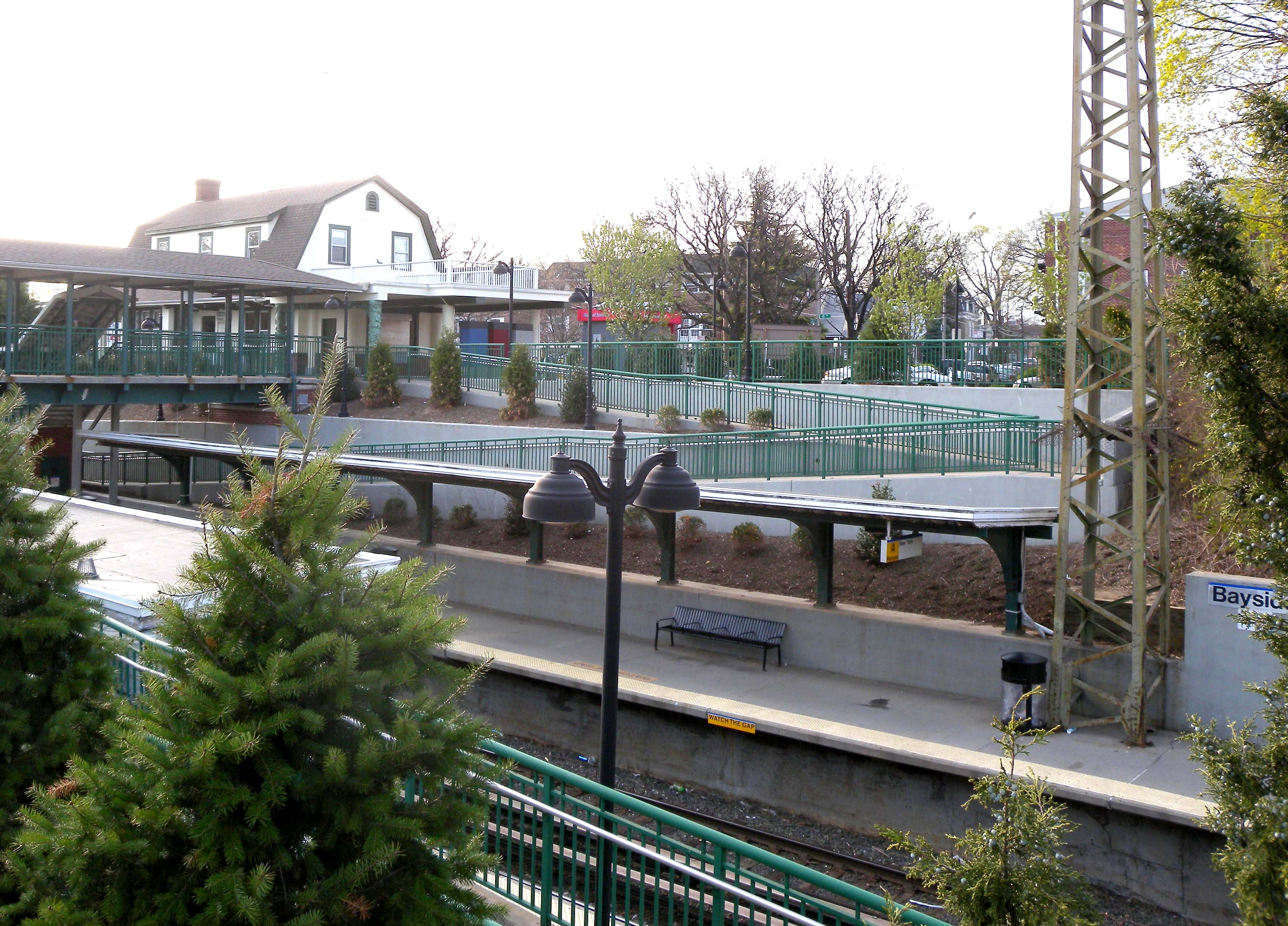
Bayside is an example of an open-cut LIRR station.

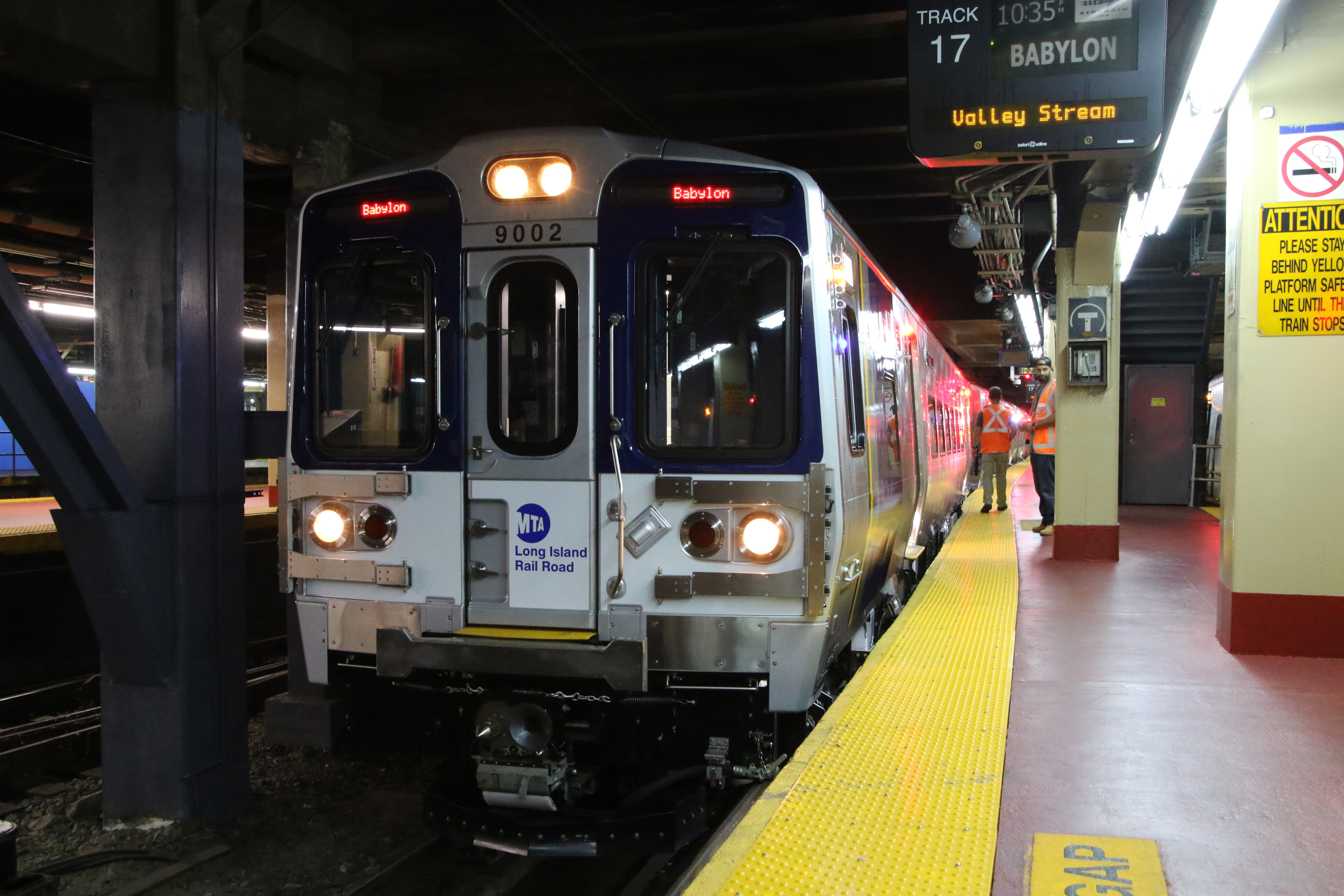
Penn Station is an example of an underground LIRR station.

Additionally, some stations have station houses ("staffed", if open), whereas others do not ("unstaffed", if there is none or if the office is closed). Some stations with station houses have ticketing offices open either part-time or full-time, whereas others do not have open ones. Additionally, some stations that lack station houses used to have them; these station houses were razed.

=== Station house designs ===
The LIRR has an amalgam of different station house designs across its system. Many station houses built during the same time period (e.g., Mineola and Manhasset; 1920s), or as part of the same project (e.g., Central Islip and Deer Park; 1987 Hicksville–Ronkonkoma electrification project), share similar or identical designs.

LIRR station houses of similar designs

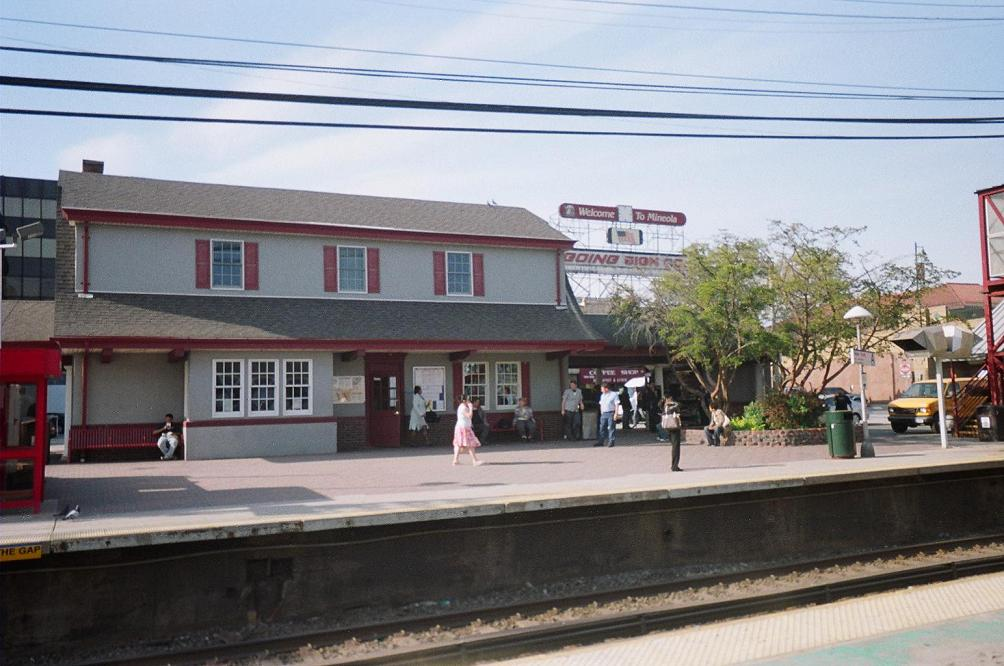
Mineola's station house

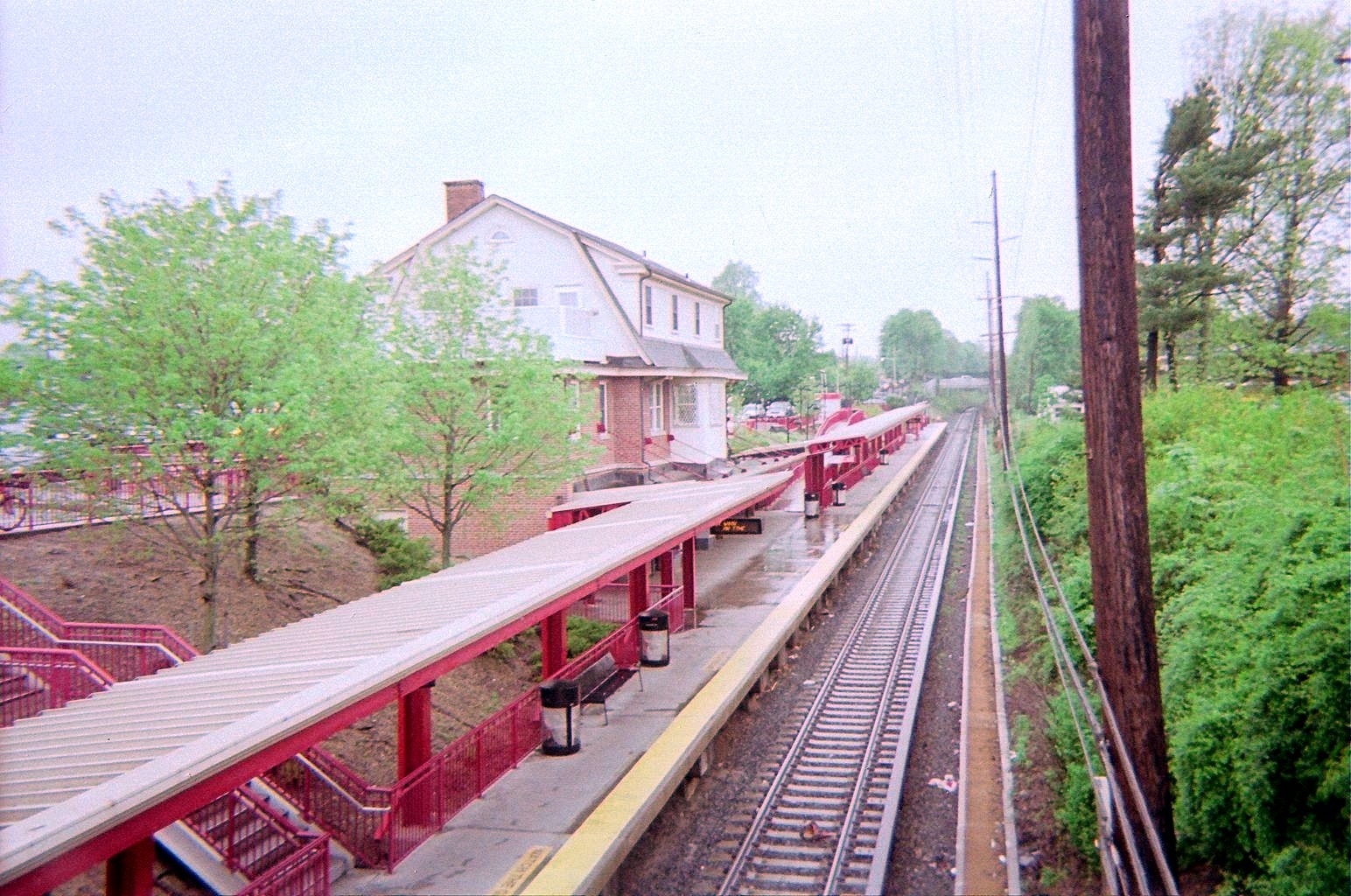
Manhasset's station house.

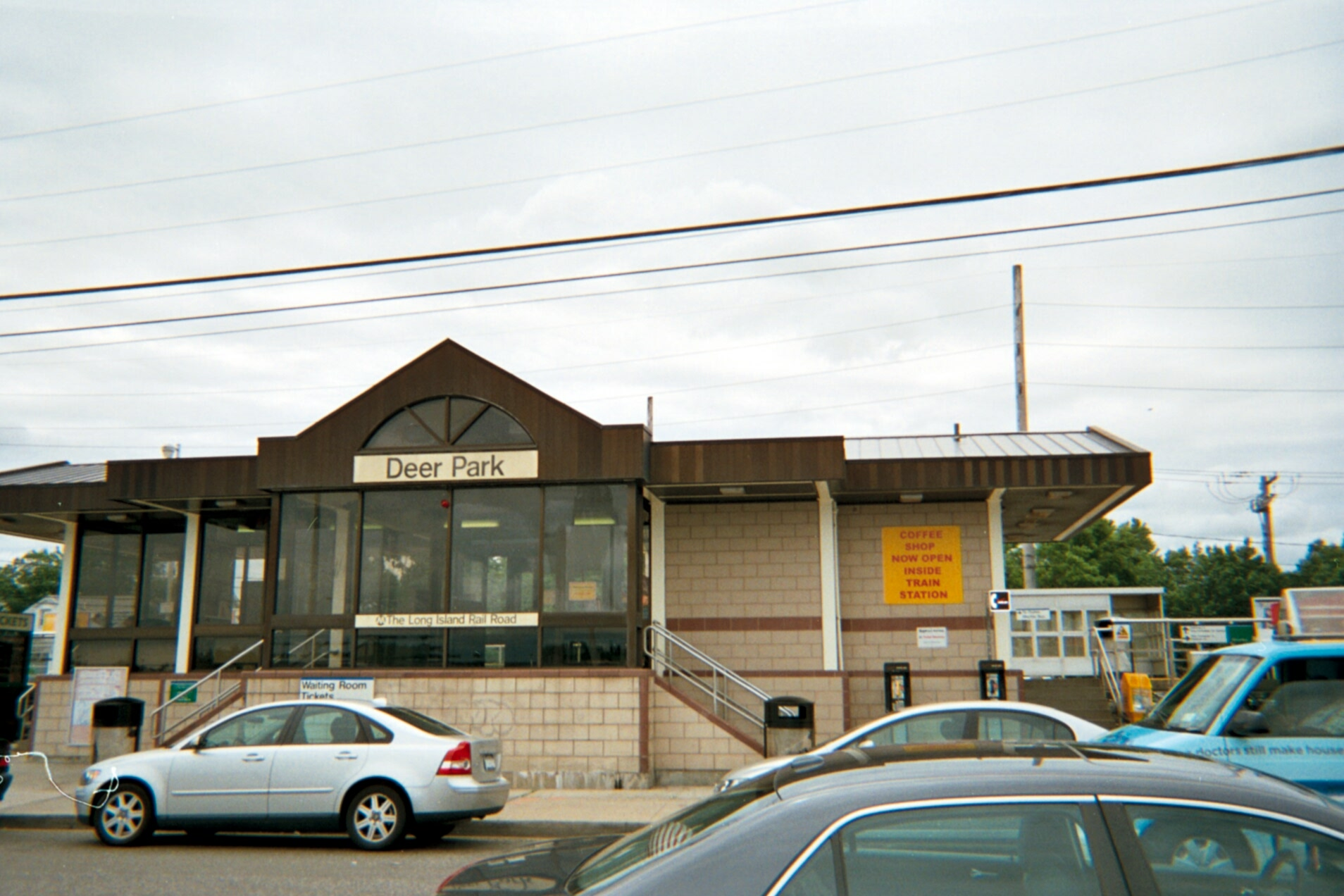
Deer Park's station house, as seen prior to its 2010s modernization

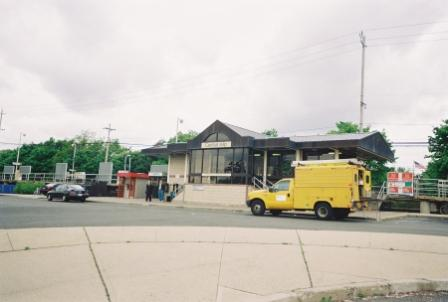
Central Islip's station house.

=== Platform lengths ===
Platform lengths across the system vary from anywhere between 1 1/2 train cars (only found at a handful of stations in diesel territory) to 14 cars; most stations in the system feature platforms long enough for 10-12 railcars (C3, M3, M7, or M9), each of which are about 85 feet (26 m) long.

Below are a sample of various stations with different platform lengths throughout the system:

- Glen Street, located on the Oyster Bay Branch, has two side platforms, each 1 1/2-cars-long.
- Pinelawn, located on the Ronkonkoma Branch, has two side platforms, each 2-cars-long.
- Westwood, located on the West Hempstead Branch, has one side platform, which is 4-cars-long.
- Hampton Bays, located on the Montauk Branch, has one side platform, which is 6-cars-long.
- Hempstead, the terminus of the Hempstead Branch, has two sets of island platforms, each 8-cars-long.
- Woodmere, located on the Far Rockaway Branch, has two side platforms, each 10-cars-long.
- Northport, located on the Port Jefferson Branch, has one side platform, which is 12-cars-long.
- Bellmore, located on the Babylon Branch, has one island platform, which is 14-cars-long.

== Historical preservation of stations ==
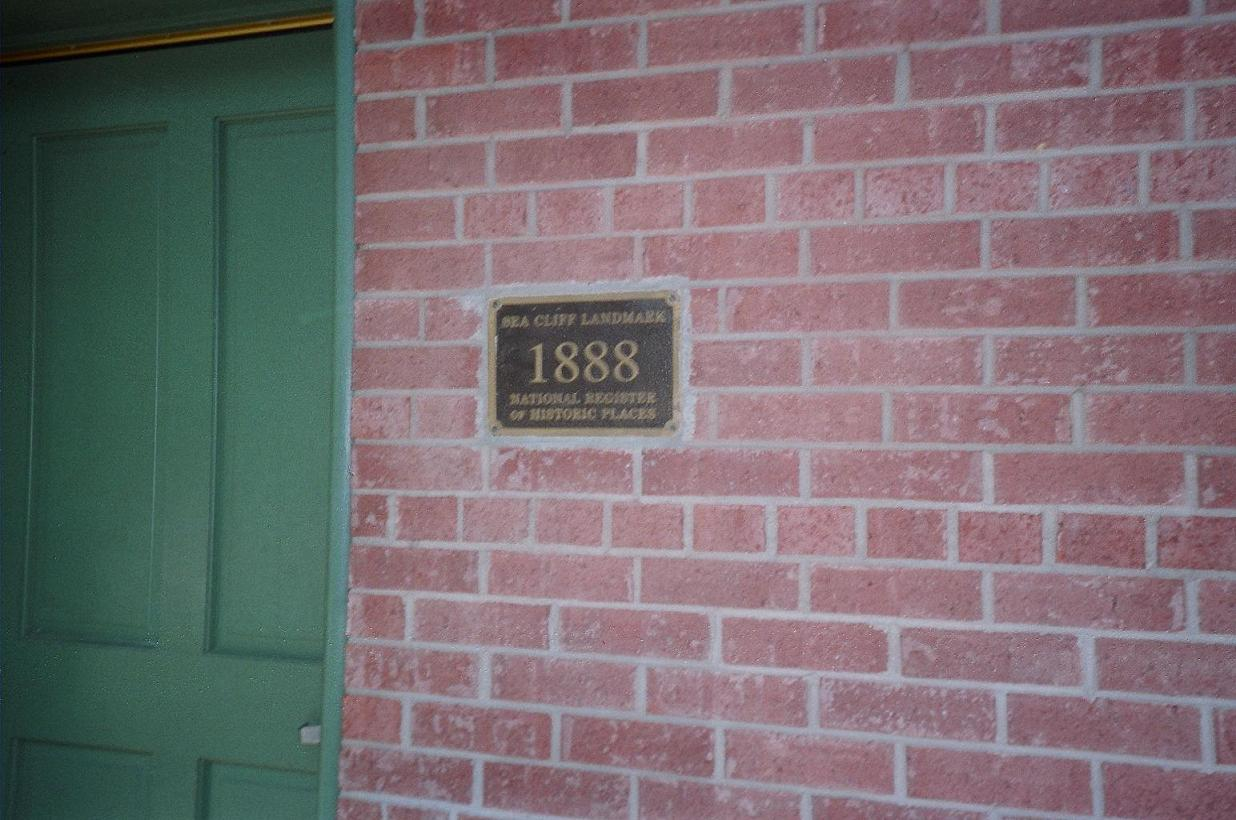
The NRHP plaque for the Sea Cliff station house.

Five LIRR stations are listed on the National Register of Historic Places: Sea Cliff, Oyster Bay, Farmingdale, Greenport and East Hampton. The St. James and Southampton stations are contributing properties to NRHP districts. Other stations that are not on the list are often cherished by local communities and treated as landmarks, such as Islip, Northport, Glen Street, and Great Neck. Roslyn, Glen Cove, and Locust Valley are other stations on the Oyster Bay Branch that are historic. Efforts to save the original East Williston station house in 2004 were unsuccessful when the structure was found to be too unstable, while the demolition of Amagansett's in 1965 brought public outcry throughout the Hamptons as well as among local railfans that has lasted for decades.

The St. James station house, built in 1873, is the oldest such building constructed by the LIRR that remains standing. Hewlett's station house is older, but it was originally built by the South Side Railroad of Long Island in 1870. On the West Hempstead Branch, Malverne's station house is the only one originally built during the first two decades of the 20th century, although it is not recognized as a historic landmark. The elaborate Forest Hills station house was one of the few to avoid modernization during the mid-to-late 20th century and has retained the original grand decorative construction. When the Babylon Branch was elevated in the post-WWII era, former station houses in Wantagh and Lindenhurst were moved away from the tracks. The former Wantagh station was transformed into a museum, and also listed on the NRHP.

== List of stations ==
This list contains all stations currently open on the Long Island Rail Road, including seasonal-use stations. Lines with colored boxes indicate branches which serve the station, while lines in parentheses indicate the physical line the station is located on, if applicable. For example, Amityville is physically located on the Montauk Branch but is served by Babylon Branch trains and only appears in the latter timetable.

Disabled access	Station is accessible by wheelchair
‡	Station meets all ADA accessibility requirements
	Station does not meet ADA accessibility requirements

Name	Line	County	Opened	Disabled access	Fare Zone	Former/other names
Albertson	Oyster Bay Branch	Nassau	1875	Disabled access	7	
Amagansett	Montauk Branch	Suffolk	1895	Disabled access	14	
Amityville	Babylon Branch (Montauk Branch)	Suffolk	1867	‡	9	
Atlantic Terminal	City Terminal Zone (Atlantic Branch)	Brooklyn	1877	‡	1	Brooklyn; Flatbush Avenue (former name)
Auburndale	Port Washington Branch	Queens	1901	Disabled access	3	
Babylon	Babylon Branch (Montauk Branch)	Suffolk	1867	‡	9	Seaside (July 1868 – 1869)
Baldwin	Babylon Branch (Montauk Branch)	Nassau	1867	Disabled access	7	Baldwinsville; Baldwins
Bay Shore	Montauk Branch	Suffolk	1868	Disabled access	10	Pentaquit (1868); Bayshore (1868-????)
Bayside	Port Washington Branch	Queens	1866	Disabled access	3	Bay Side
Bellerose	Hempstead Branch	Nassau	1898		4	
Bellmore	Babylon Branch (Montauk Branch)	Nassau	1870	Disabled access	7	
Bellport	Montauk Branch	Suffolk	1882	Disabled access	12	
Belmont Park	Belmont Park Branch	Queens	1905	Disabled access	4	
Bethpage	Ronkonkoma Branch (Main Line)	Nassau	1854	Disabled access	7	Jerusalem Station (1854–1936); Central Park (1867–1936)
Boland's Landing	City Terminal Zone (Atlantic Branch)	Queens	1886		N/A	
Brentwood	Ronkonkoma Branch (Main Line)	Suffolk	1870	Disabled access	10	
Bridgehampton	Montauk Branch	Suffolk	1870	Disabled access	14	
Broadway	Port Washington Branch	Queens	1866	Disabled access	3	
Carle Place	Port Jefferson Branch (Main Line)	Nassau	1842	‡	7	Carll Place
Cedarhurst	Far Rockaway Branch	Nassau	1869	Disabled access	4	
Central Islip	Ronkonkoma Branch (Main Line)	Suffolk	1873	Disabled access	10	
Centre Avenue	Long Beach Branch	Nassau	1898	Disabled access	7	
Cold Spring Harbor	Port Jefferson Branch	Suffolk	1875	Disabled access	9	
Copiague	Babylon Branch (Montauk Branch)	Suffolk	1902	‡	9	
Country Life Press	Hempstead Branch	Nassau	1911	Disabled access	4	
Deer Park	Ronkonkoma Branch (Main Line)	Suffolk	1842	Disabled access	9	
Douglaston	Port Washington Branch	Queens	1866	Disabled access	3	Little Neck (1866–1870)
East Hampton	Montauk Branch	Suffolk	1895	Disabled access	14	
East New York	City Terminal Zone (Atlantic Branch)	Brooklyn	1878		1	
East Rockaway	Long Beach Branch	Nassau	1880	Disabled access	7	
East Williston	Oyster Bay Branch	Nassau	1880	Disabled access	4	
Elmont–UBS Arena	Hempstead Branch (Main Line)	Nassau	2021	‡	4	
Far Rockaway	Far Rockaway Branch	Queens	1869	Disabled access	4	
Farmingdale	Ronkonkoma Branch (Main Line)	Nassau	1841	Disabled access	7	
Floral Park	Hempstead Branch (Main Line)	Nassau	1878	Disabled access	4	Stewart Junction (1878–1879); Hinsdale (1879–1887); East Hinsdale (1887–1890)
Flushing–Main Street	Port Washington Branch	Queens	1854	‡	3	
Forest Hills	City Terminal Zone (Main Line)	Queens	1906	Disabled access	1	
Freeport	Babylon Branch (Montauk Branch)	Nassau	1867	Disabled access	7	
Garden City	Hempstead Branch	Nassau	1873	Disabled access	4	
Gibson	Far Rockaway Branch	Nassau	1928	Disabled access	4	
Glen Cove	Oyster Bay Branch	Nassau	1895	Disabled access	7	
Glen Head	Oyster Bay Branch	Nassau	1865	Disabled access	7	
Glen Street	Oyster Bay Branch	Nassau	1867	Disabled access	7	
Grand Central	City Terminal Zone	Manhattan	2023	‡	1	East Side Access (1963–2022)
Great Neck	Port Washington Branch	Nassau	1866	‡	4	Brookdale (1869–1872)
Great River	Montauk Branch	Suffolk	1897	Disabled access	10	
Greenlawn	Port Jefferson Branch	Suffolk	1870	Disabled access	9	
Greenport	Ronkonkoma Branch (Main Line)	Suffolk	1844	Disabled access	14	
Greenvale	Oyster Bay Branch	Nassau	1866	Disabled access	7	Week's Station
Hampton Bays	Montauk Branch	Suffolk	1871	Disabled access	14	Good Ground (1869–1922)
Hempstead	Hempstead Branch	Nassau	1873	‡	4	
Hempstead Gardens	West Hempstead Branch	Nassau	1893	Disabled access	4	
Hewlett	Far Rockaway Branch	Nassau	1869	Disabled access	4	Cedar Grove (July–October 1869); Hewletts (1869-?)
Hicksville	Port Jefferson Branch (Main Line)	Nassau	1837	‡	7	
Hillside Facility	City Terminal Zone (Main Line)	Queens	1991		N/A	
Hollis	Hempstead Branch (Main Line)	Queens	1885		3	
Hunterspoint Avenue	City Terminal Zone (Main Line)	Queens	1860		1	
Huntington	Port Jefferson Branch	Suffolk	1867	‡	9	
Inwood	Far Rockaway Branch	Nassau	1911	Disabled access	4	
Island Park	Long Beach Branch	Nassau	1898	Disabled access	7	The Dykes
Islip	Montauk Branch	Suffolk	1868	Disabled access	10	
Jamaica	City Terminal Zone (Main Line, Atlantic Branch, Montauk Branch)	Queens	1836	‡	3	
Kew Gardens	City Terminal Zone (Main Line)	Queens	1910	Disabled access	1	Kew (1910–1912)
Kings Park	Port Jefferson Branch	Suffolk	1872	Disabled access	10	St. Johnsland (1872–1891)
Lakeview	West Hempstead Branch	Nassau	1924	Disabled access	4	
Laurelton	Far Rockaway Branch (Atlantic Branch)	Queens	1907	Disabled access	3	
Lawrence	Far Rockaway Branch	Nassau	1869	Disabled access	4	
Lindenhurst	Babylon Branch (Montauk Branch)	Suffolk	1868	‡	9	Wellwood (1867–1870); Breslau (1870–1891)
Little Neck	Port Washington Branch	Queens	1870	Disabled access	3	
Locust Manor	Far Rockaway Branch (Atlantic Branch)	Queens	1869	Disabled access	3	Locust Avenue (1869–1929); Racetrack (1906–1929); Jamaica Racetrack (1929–1959)
Locust Valley	Oyster Bay Branch	Nassau	1869	Disabled access	7	
Long Beach	Long Beach Branch	Nassau	1880	‡	7	
Long Island City	City Terminal Zone (Main Line, Montauk Branch)	Queens	1854	Disabled access	1	
Lynbrook	Long Beach Branch (Montauk Branch)	Nassau	1867	‡	4	
Malverne	West Hempstead Branch	Nassau	1913	Disabled access	4	
Manhasset	Port Washington Branch	Nassau	1899	Disabled access	4	
Massapequa	Babylon Branch (Montauk Branch)	Nassau	1867	Disabled access	7	
Massapequa Park	Babylon Branch (Montauk Branch)	Nassau	1933	Disabled access	7	
Mastic–Shirley	Montauk Branch	Suffolk	1960	Disabled access	12	
Mattituck	Ronkonkoma Branch (Main Line)	Suffolk	1844	Disabled access	14	
Medford	Ronkonkoma Branch (Main Line)	Suffolk	1844	Disabled access	10	
Merillon Avenue	Port Jefferson Branch (Main Line)	Nassau	1912	‡	4	Clowesville (1837–1874); Garden City (1874–1876)
Merrick	Babylon Branch (Montauk Branch)	Nassau	1867	Disabled access	7	
Mets–Willets Point	Port Washington Branch	Queens	1939		1	World's Fair (1939–1940; 1961–1966) United Nations (1946–1952) Shea Stadium (1966–2009)
Mineola	Port Jefferson Branch (Main Line)	Nassau	1837	‡	4	Branch (1837-?); Hempstead Branch
Montauk	Montauk Branch	Suffolk	1907	Disabled access	14	
Murray Hill	Port Washington Branch	Queens	1889	‡	3	
Nassau Boulevard	Hempstead Branch	Nassau	1907	Disabled access	4	
New Hyde Park	Port Jefferson Branch (Main Line)	Nassau	1870	‡	4	Hyde Park
Northport	Port Jefferson Branch	Suffolk	1873	‡	9	
Nostrand Avenue	City Terminal Zone (Atlantic Branch)	Brooklyn	1877	‡	1	
Oakdale	Montauk Branch	Suffolk	1868	Disabled access	10	
Oceanside	Long Beach Branch	Nassau	1897	Disabled access	7	
Oyster Bay	Oyster Bay Branch	Nassau	1889	Disabled access	7	
Patchogue	Montauk Branch	Suffolk	1869	‡	10	
Penn Station	City Terminal Zone (Northeast Corridor)	Manhattan	1910	‡	1	
Pinelawn	Ronkonkoma Branch (Main Line)	Suffolk	1895	‡	9	Melville (1895–1897); Pinelawn (Melville) (1897–1899); Pinelawn Cemetery (1904-?)
Plandome	Port Washington Branch	Nassau	1909	Disabled access	4	
Port Jefferson	Port Jefferson Branch	Suffolk	1873	‡	10	
Port Washington	Port Washington Branch	Nassau	1898	‡	4	
Queens Village	Hempstead Branch (Main Line)	Queens	1871	Disabled access	3	Inglewood (1871–1879); Queens (1879–1924)
Riverhead	Ronkonkoma Branch (Main Line)	Suffolk	1870	Disabled access	14	
Rockville Centre	Babylon Branch (Montauk Branch)	Nassau	1867	‡	7	
Ronkonkoma	Ronkonkoma Branch (Main Line)	Suffolk	1883	‡	10	Lake Ronkonkoma
Rosedale	Far Rockaway Branch (Atlantic Branch)	Queens	1870	Disabled access	3	Foster's Meadow (1870–1892)
Roslyn	Oyster Bay Branch	Nassau	1865	Disabled access	7	
St. Albans	West Hempstead Branch (Montauk Branch)	Queens	1898	Disabled access	3	Locust Avenue
St. James	Port Jefferson Branch	Suffolk	1873	Disabled access	10	
Sayville	Montauk Branch	Suffolk	1868	Disabled access	10	
Sea Cliff	Oyster Bay Branch	Nassau	1867	Disabled access	7	
Seaford	Babylon Branch (Montauk Branch)	Nassau	1899	Disabled access	7	
Smithtown	Port Jefferson Branch	Suffolk	1872	Disabled access	10	
Southampton	Montauk Branch	Suffolk	1871	Disabled access	14	
Southold	Ronkonkoma Branch (Main Line)	Suffolk	1844	Disabled access	14	
Speonk	Montauk Branch	Suffolk	1870	Disabled access	12	Remsenberg
Stewart Manor	Hempstead Branch	Nassau	1873	Disabled access	4	Hyde Park (1873–1876); Hyde Park Central (1878–1879)
Stony Brook	Port Jefferson Branch	Suffolk	1873	Disabled access	10	
Syosset	Port Jefferson Branch	Nassau	1854	Disabled access	7	
Valley Stream	Far Rockaway Branch (Atlantic Branch)	Nassau	1869	Disabled access	4	
Wantagh	Babylon Branch (Montauk Branch)	Nassau	1867	Disabled access	7	Ridgewood (1867–1891)
Westbury	Port Jefferson Branch (Main Line)	Nassau	1837	‡	7	
Westhampton	Montauk Branch	Suffolk	1870	Disabled access	14	
West Hempstead	West Hempstead Branch	Nassau	1928	Disabled access	4	
Westwood	West Hempstead Branch	Nassau	1929	Disabled access	4	
Woodmere	Far Rockaway Branch	Nassau	1869	Disabled access	4	Wood's; Woodsburgh
Woodside	City Terminal Zone (Main Line); Port Washington Branch	Queens	1869	‡	1	
Wyandanch	Ronkonkoma Branch (Main Line)	Suffolk	1875	‡	9	
Yaphank–BNL	Ronkonkoma Branch (Main Line)	Suffolk	2026	‡	12	

== Disused and former stations ==
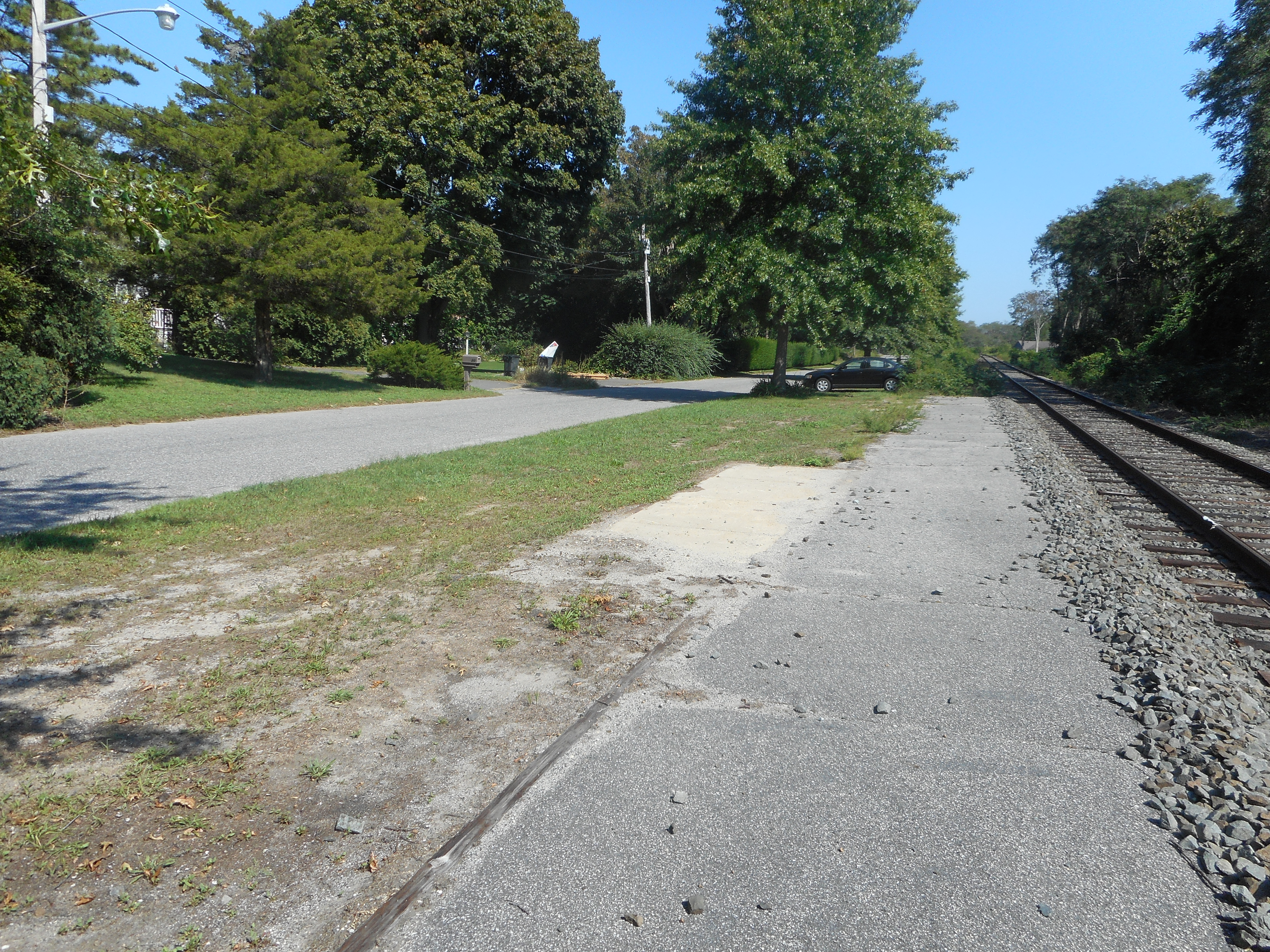
The site of the former Jamesport station.

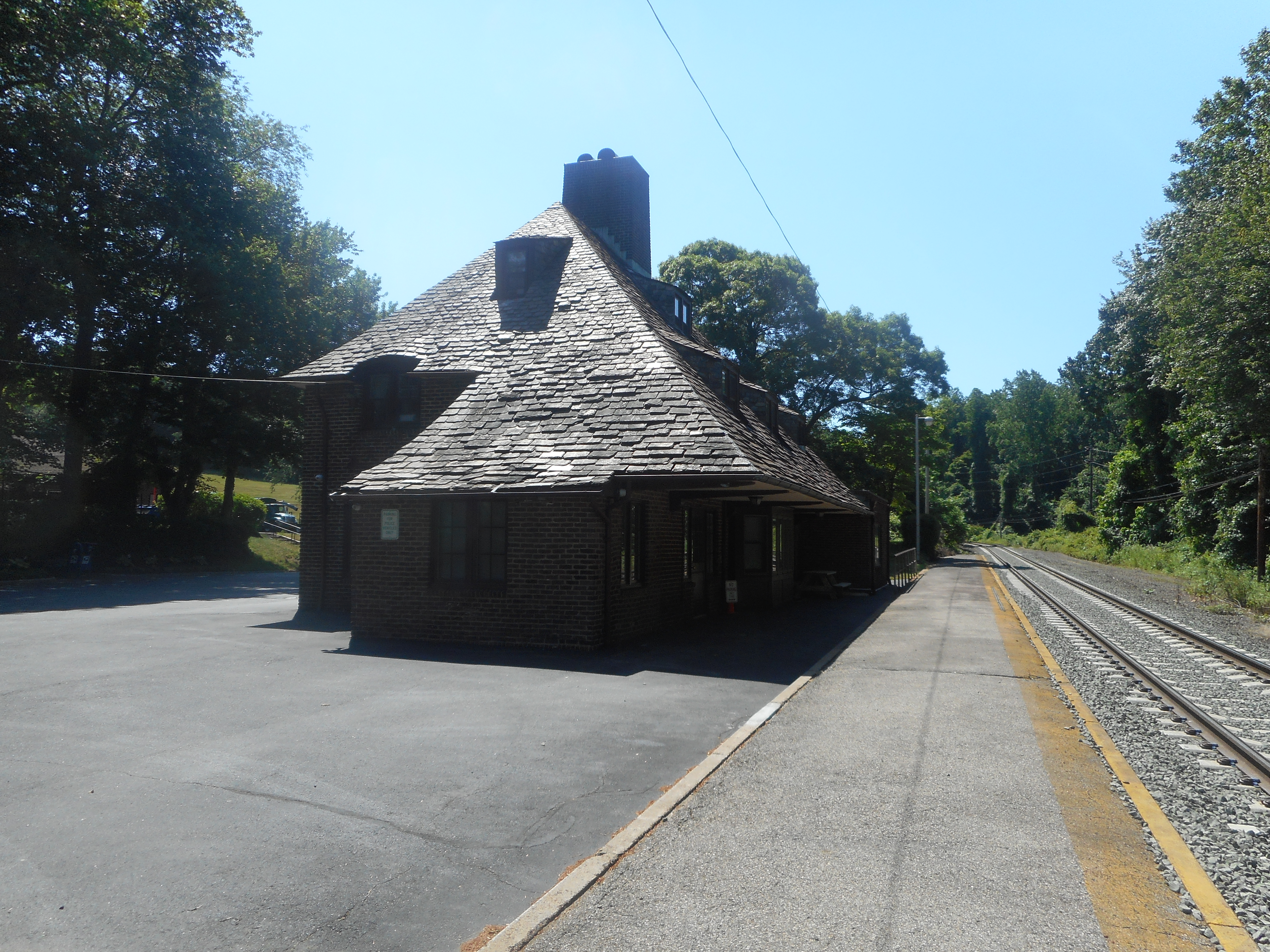
The former Mill Neck station is now used as the village's post office.

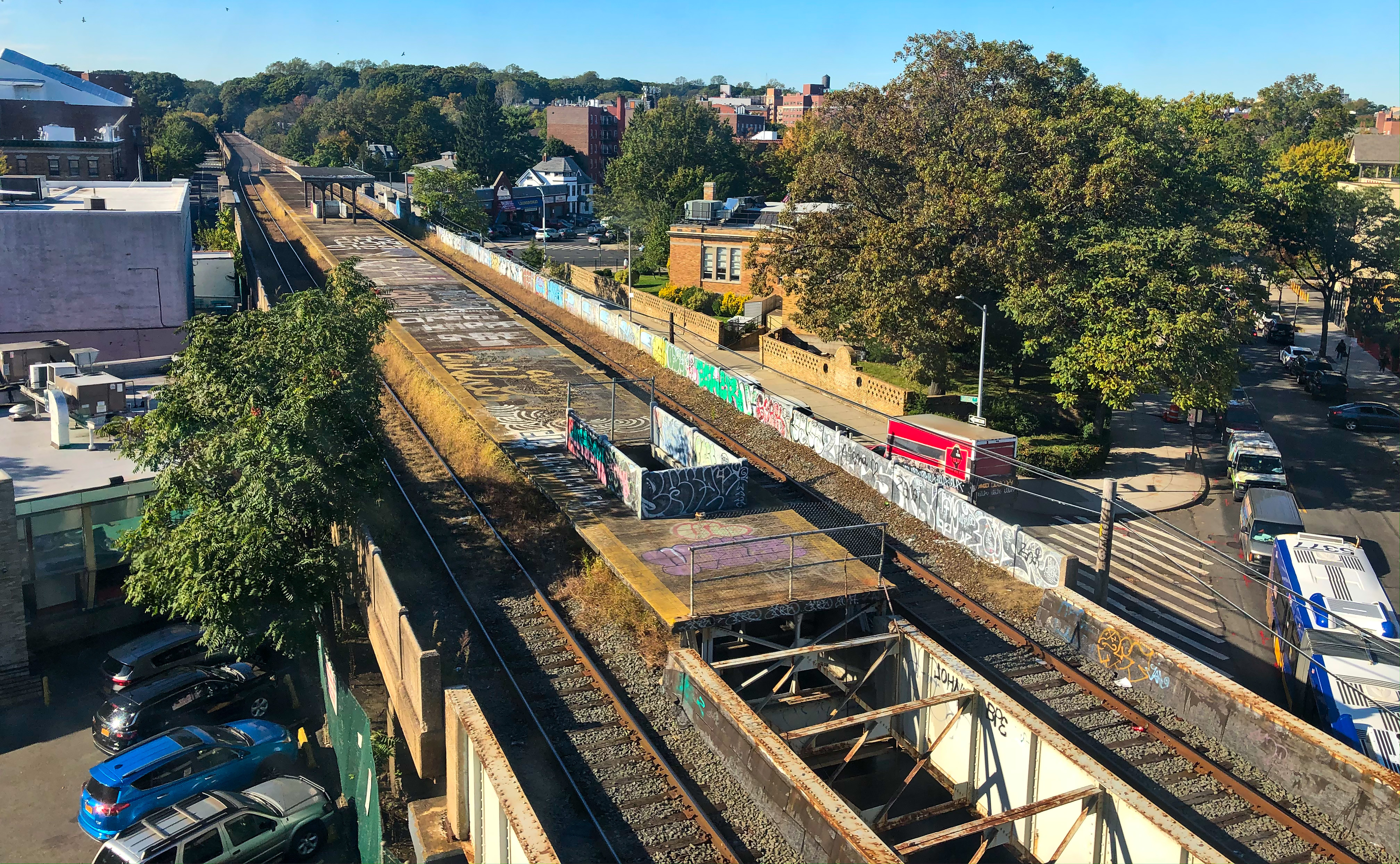
The former Richmond Hill station, which closed in 1998, along with the rest of the Lower Montauk Branch stations, due to low ridership.

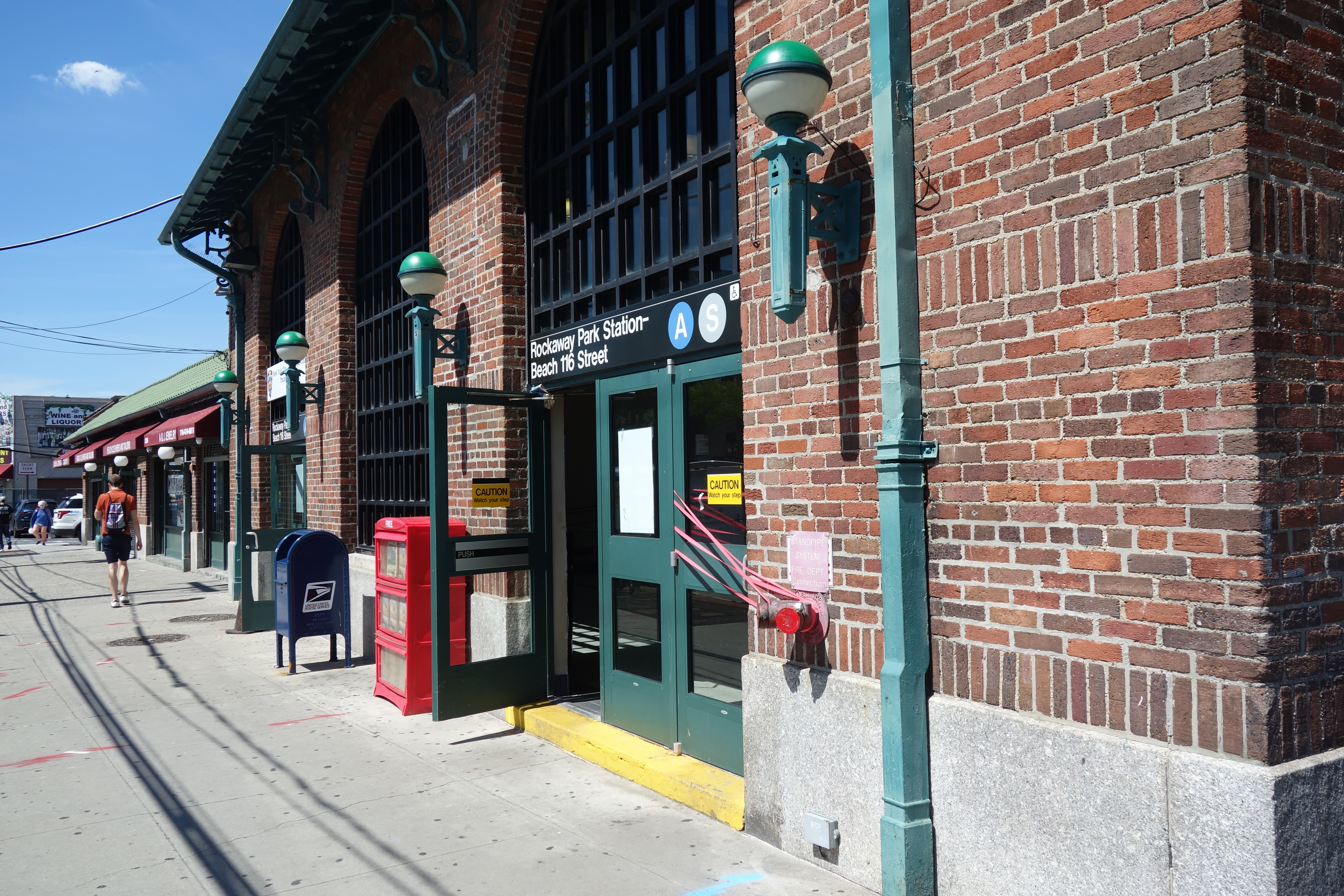
The former LIRR Rockaway Park LIRR station was made part of the NYC Subway in 1956, and is now the terminus of the A Train and the Rockaway Shuttle.

These stations are either demolished or existing but not currently in use by the Long Island Rail Road. Several stations of the Rockaway Beach Branch and Far Rockaway Branch were taken over by the New York City Subway as the IND Rockaway Line in 1956.

Name	Line	Opened	Closed
A&P Bronze, earlier A&P	Central Extension	1928	1953
Adamsville	Atlantic Branch	1872	1876
Albany Avenue	Atlantic Branch	1877?	1951
Aquebogue	Main Line	1892	1967
Aqueduct, earlier South Woodhaven	Rockaway Beach Branch	1883	1955
Arverne	Far Rockaway Branch	1888	1955
Atlantic Avenue, merged with East Rockaway	Long Beach Branch	1898	1951
Atlantic Park	Far Rockaway Branch	1875	1887?
Atlanticville	Montauk Branch	see East Quogue	
Autumn Avenue	Atlantic Branch	1905	1939
Aviation Field Number 2	Central Extension	see Mitchel Field	
Babylon	Central Extension	1873	1874
Baiting Hollow	Main Line	see Calverton	
Bartlett	Montauk Branch	1924	1928
Bartlett's, earlier Bellport	Main Line	1844	1880
Bayport	Montauk Branch	1868	1980
Bay Ridge	Bay Ridge Branch	1870s	1904
Bayville	Oyster Bay Branch	1889	1892
Beach Channel	Far Rockaway Branch	1888	1905
Beach House, earlier Beach	Far Rockaway Branch	see South Side Pavilion	
Beaver Street, merged with Jamaica	Atlantic Branch	1867	1913
Bedford	Atlantic Branch	1878	1905
Bellaire	Main Line	1900	1972
Belmont Junction	Central Extension and Montauk Branch	1875?	1876?
Berlin Switch, earlier Berlin	Atlantic Branch	1869; 1877	1876
Bethpage	Bethpage Branch	1874	1942
Bethpage Junction	Central Extension	1873	1877
Bluepoint, earlier Blue Point	Montauk Branch	1870; 1900	1882; 1980
Breslau	Central Extension	1873	1875
Bridgeport	Southern Hempstead Branch	1870	1879
Bridge Street	Whitestone Branch	1869	1932
Broad Channel	Rockaway Beach Branch	1880	1950
Brookhaven	Montauk Branch	1884; 1944	1932; 1958
Brooklyn Hills	Rockaway Beach Branch	1882	1911
Brooklyn Manor	Rockaway Beach Branch	1911	1962
Brushville	Main Line	1837	1871
Bushwick	Bushwick Branch	1868?	1924
Bushwick Junction	Montauk Branch	see Fresh Pond	
Calvary Cemetery	Montauk Branch	1863	????
Calverton	Main Line	1852 1880	1858 1958
Camp Black	Central Extension	see Mitchel Field	
Camp Upton	Main Line	1917; 1942	1922; 1946
Canal Street	Main Line	1890	1899
Canoe Place	Montauk Branch	1939	1953
Carman's River	Main Line	1844	1845
Cedar Manor, earlier Power Place	Atlantic Branch	1906	1959
Center Moriches, earlier Moriches	Montauk Branch	1881	1998
Central Islip State Hospital	Main Line	1911?	1980
Central Junction	Creedmoor Branch	1873	1879
Central Park	Central Extension	1873	1876
Clarenceville	Atlantic Branch	1874; 1905	1939
Clarenceville	Montauk Branch	see Richmond Hill	
Clear Stream	Montauk Branch	1906	1910
Clinton Road	Central Extension	1915	1953
Club House	Montauk Branch	1870	1897
Club House	Long Beach Branch	1898	1909
College Point	Whitestone Branch	1869	1932
Cooper Avenue	Evergreen Branch and Bay Ridge Branch	1883	1894
Corona	Port Washington Branch	1854	1964
Corona Park	White Line	1873	1876
Creedmoor	Creedmoor Branch	1873	1879
Cutchogue	Main Line	1844	1962
Cypress Avenue, earlier Ridgewood	Bay Ridge Branch	1883	1924
DeKalb Avenue	Evergreen Branch	1878	1894
Dunton	Atlantic Branch	1868	1939
East Moriches	Montauk Branch	1897	1958
East Patchogue	Montauk Branch	1890	1928
East Quogue	Montauk Branch	1871	c. 1883
Eastport	Montauk Branch and Manorville Branch	1881	1958
Edgemere	Far Rockaway Branch	1895	1955
Edgewood	Main Line	1892	1914
Eldert's Grove	Far Rockaway Branch	1872	1887?
Elmhurst	Port Washington Branch	1855	1985
Fanny Bartlett	Montauk Branch	see Bartlett	
Farmingdale	Central Extension	see South Farmingdale	
Far Rockaway – Lockwood's Grove	Cedarhurst Cut-off	1872	1877
Fashion Race Course	Port Washington Branch	see Corona	
Fifth Street	Evergreen Branch	1878	1879
Fire Place	Main Line	1844	1845
Flowerfield	Wading River Branch	1910	1958
Flushing Bridge Street	Whitestone Branch	see Bridge Street	
Ford's Corners	Bay Ridge Branch	see Rugby	
Forge	Montauk Branch	see Mastic	
Frank Avenue	Far Rockaway Branch	1922	1955
Frankiston	Creedmoor Branch	1873	1879
Franklin Avenue	Atlantic Branch	see Bedford	
Fresh Pond	Montauk Branch	1869	1998
Fulton Street	Bay Ridge Branch	1914	1924
Gaston Avenue	Far Rockaway Branch	see Arverne	
General Bronze	Central Extension	see A&P Bronze	
Glendale	Montauk Branch	1869	1998
Golf Grounds	Montauk Branch	1907	1939
Goose Creek	Rockaway Beach Branch	1888	1935
Grand Street	Main Line	1913	1925
Grand Street	Evergreen Branch	1878	1885
Greenpoint	Evergreen Branch	1878	1885
Grinnell	Woodside Branch	1874	1877
Grumman	Main Line	1942	1985
Haberman	Montauk Branch	1910	1998
Hagerman	Montauk Branch	1890	1928
Hamilton Beach	Rockaway Beach Branch	1919	1955
Hammels, earlier Hammel	Rockaway Beach Branch	1880	1941
Hebbard's	Bushwick Branch	1870	1870
Hempstead	old Hempstead Branch		
Hempstead	Southern Hempstead Branch	1870	1879
Hermanville	Main Line	1850	
Hermitage	Main Line	see Peconic	
Higbie Avenue, earlier Springfield	Atlantic Branch	1908	1960
Hillside	Main Line	c. 1909, May 15, 1911	Early 1911, 1966
Hillside	Creedmoor Branch	1874	1879
Hinsdale	Creedmoor Branch	1873	1879
Holbrook	Main Line	1907	1962
Holland, earlier Hollands	Rockaway Beach Branch	1880	1955
Holland's	Far Rockaway Branch	1872	1887?
Holtsville	Main Line	1843	1998
Hopedale	Main Line	1875	1884
Howard Beach	Rockaway Beach Branch	????	1955
Howard House	Atlantic Branch	1843	1905
Howard's Landing, also called Howard	Rockaway Beach Branch	1898	1907
Hulse Turnout	Main Line	See Calverton	
Humboldt Street	Evergreen Branch	1878	1885
Hunter's Point	Port Washington Branch	1854; 1869; 1878	1862; 1878
Inglewood	Main Line	1871	1879
Interstate Park	Main Line	see Bellaire	
Island Trees	Central Extension	1873	1876
Islip Centre	Montauk Branch		May 1870
Jamaica Racetrack	Atlantic Branch	see Locust Manor	
Jamesport	Main Line	1845	1985
Jekyl Island, earlier Barnum Island	Long Beach Branch	1901	1922
Kings Highway	Manhattan Beach Branch	1883	1924
Kings Park State Hospital	Port Jefferson Branch	1911?	1970
Kissena Park, earlier Kissena	Creedmoor Branch	1873; 1877	1876; 1879
Kouwenhoven	Bay Ridge Branch	1877	1924
Lakeland, earlier Lake Road	Main Line	1843	1883
Landia	Port Jefferson Branch	1952	1972
Lamb's Corner	Sag Harbor Branch	see Noyack Road	
Laurel	Main Line	1901	1967
Laurel Hill	Montauk Branch	1890	1900
Lefferts Avenue	Atlantic Branch		
Linwood Street	Atlantic Branch		
Locust Avenue	Cedarhurst Cut-Off	see St. Albans	
Long Island Rail Road Crossing	Central Extension	1875	1875
Malba	Whitestone Branch	1908	1932
Manhattan Beach	Manhattan Beach Branch	1909	1924
Manhattan Crossing	Atlantic Branch		
Manorville, earlier Manor	Main Line and Manorville Branch	1845; 1871; 1941	1869; 1941; 1968
Maple Grove	Main Line	1879; 1883	1882; 1909
Maspeth	Montauk Branch	1895	1924
Maspeth	Flushing and North Shore Railroad	1855	ca. 1858
Mastic	Montauk Branch	1882	1960
Matawok	Rockaway Beach Branch	1910	1913
Matawok	Main Line	1922	1925
Meadowbrook	Central Extension	1873	1876
Metropolitan Avenue	Bushwick Branch		1924
Miller's Place, earlier Miller Place	Wading River Branch	1898	1938
Mill Neck	Oyster Bay Branch	1892; 1912; 1919	1911; 1918; 1998
Mitchell Field, earlier Mitchel Field	Central Extension	1896	1953
Moriches	Sag Harbor Branch	see Eastport	
Morris Park, earlier Morris Grove	Atlantic Branch	1868; 1886	1886; 1939
Myrtle Avenue	Bay Ridge Branch	1893	1924
Myrtle Avenue	Evergreen Branch	1878	1882
Napeague Beach	Montauk Branch	1895	1927
National Rifle Range	Creedmoor Branch	see Creedmoor	
Neck Road	Manhattan Beach Branch	1893	1924
Neptune House	Far Rockaway Branch	1875	1887?
New Bridge Road	Central Extension	1874	1876
New Brooklyn	Atlantic Branch		
New Cassel	Main Line	1875	1876
Newsday	Central Extension	1949	1953
Newtown	Port Washington Branch	see Elmhurst	
Newtown	White Line	1873	1876
New York Avenue	Main Line	1890	1905
Nichols Road	Main Line		
Northport Village	Northport Branch	1868	1899
North Roslyn	Oyster Bay Branch	1898	1924
Norwood	Southern Hempstead Branch	1870	1879
Norwood	West Hempstead Branch	See Malverne	
Norwood Avenue	Atlantic Branch		
Noyack Road	Sag Harbor Branch	1906	1939
Ocean Avenue	Bay Ridge Branch		
Ocean Point	Far Rockaway Branch	see Cedarhurst	
Old Northport	Northport Branch	see Northport Village	
Ozone Park	Rockaway Beach Branch	1884	1962
Parkside	Rockaway Beach Branch	1927	1962
Parkville	Manhattan Beach Branch	July 1877	Summer 1897
Pearsall's, earlier Pearsall's Corners	Montauk Branch	see Lynbrook	
Peconic	Main Line	1844 or 1848	c. 1970
Penataquit	Montauk Branch	see Bay Shore	
Penny Bridge	Montauk Branch	1854; 1902	1869; 1998
Pilgrim State Hospital	Main Line	1929?	1978
Pineaire, merged with Deer Park	Main Line	1915	1986
Playland	Rockaway Beach Branch	1903	1955
Promised Land	Montauk Branch	1924	1938
Queenswater, earlier Inner Beach	Long Beach Branch	1898	1936
Quogue	Montauk Branch	1875	1998
Railroad Avenue	Atlantic Branch	see Autumn Avenue	
Ralph Avenue	Atlantic Branch		
Ramblersville	Rockaway Beach Branch	see Howard Beach	
The Raunt	Rockaway Beach Branch	1888	1950
Rego Park	Main Line	1928	1962
Republic	Main Line	1940	1987
Richmond Hill	Montauk Branch	1868	1998
Ridgewood	Montauk Branch	1883	1924
Ridgewood	Montauk Branch	see Wantagh	
Ridgewood	Evergreen Branch	see DeKalb Avenue	
Rochester Avenue	Atlantic Branch		
Rockaway Avenue	Atlantic Branch		
Rockaway Junction	Main Line and Montauk Branch (West Hempstead Branch)	See Woodhull Park	
Rockaway Park, earlier Rockaway Beach	Rockaway Beach Branch	1882	1955
Rocky Point	Wading River Branch	1895	1938
Roosevelt Raceway	Central Extension	1939	1961
Rugby	Bay Ridge Branch	1888	1924
Sag Harbor	Sag Harbor Branch	1871	1939
Saint George's Manor	Main Line	see Manorville	
Salisbury Plains	Central Extension		
Schenectady Avenue	Atlantic Branch		
Sea Side House	Far Rockaway Branch	1872	1887?
Seaside	Montauk Branch	see Babylon	
Seaside	Rockaway Beach Branch	1880	1955
Setauket	Port Jefferson Branch	1877 or 1883	1980
Shea Stadium	Port Washington Branch	see Mets – Willets Point	
Sheepshead Bay	Manhattan Beach Branch	1877	1924
Shinnecock Hills	Montauk Branch	1887	1932
Shops	Montauk Branch		
Shoreham	Wading River Branch	1895	1938
Southampton College, earlier Southampton Campus	Montauk Branch	1976	1998
South Eighth Street	Bushwick Branch	1868	1876
South Farmingdale, earlier Farmingdale	Central Branch	1873; 1936	1898; 1972
South Greenfield	Manhattan Beach Branch	1877	1924
South Lynbrook	Long Beach Branch	see Centre Avenue	
South Oyster Bay	Montauk Branch	see Massapequa	
South Side Pavilion	Far Rockaway Branch	1870	1876?
South Side Railroad Crossing	Bushwick Branch and Evergreen Branch	1878	1890
South Side Railroad Crossing	Atlantic Branch	see Berlin Switch	
South Street	Atlantic Branch	1917	1922
Springfield	Atlantic Branch	1867	1876; 1906
Springfield Gardens, earlier Springfield	Montauk Branch	1873	1979
Steeplechase	Rockaway Beach Branch	see Playland	
Stewart Avenue	West Hempstead Branch	1923	1926
Stewart Junction	Main Line	see Floral Park	
Straiton Avenue a.k.a.; Arverne-Straiton Avenue	Far Rockaway Branch	1892	1955
Suffolk	Main Line	1842	1873
Suffolk Downs	Montauk Branch	1907	1927
Sunnyside	White Line		
Thompson's	Main Line	1842	1869
Troy Avenue	Atlantic Branch		
Union Course	Atlantic Branch	1905	1939
Union Hall Street	Main Line	1913	1976
United Nations	Port Washington Branch	see Mets – Willets Point	
Unqua	Montauk Branch	1880	1893
Upton Road	Main Line	1918	1922
Utica Avenue	Atlantic Branch		
Vanderbilt Avenue	Atlantic Branch		
Vanderveer Park	Bay Ridge Branch	1878	1924
Van Wicklens	Atlantic Branch	see Linwood Street	
Van Wyck Avenue	Atlantic Branch	see Berlin Switch	
Wading River	Wading River Branch	1895	1938
Wainscott	Montauk Branch	1897	1938
Wampmissick	Main Line	1847–1848	Unknown
Wardenclyffe	Wading River Branch	see Shoreham	
Warwick Street	Atlantic Branch	1905	1939
Washington Avenue	Atlantic Branch	1878	????
Washington Street	Central Extension		
Watermill	Montauk Branch	1875	1968
Wavecrest	Far Rockaway Branch	1928	1955
Waverly	Main Line	see Holtsville	
Wellwood	Montauk Branch	see Lindenhurst	
Westbridge, earlier High Bridge	Main Line	1916	1939
West Deer Park	Main Line	see Wyandanch	
West Flushing	Port Washington Branch	1854	
West Flushing	Port Washington Branch	see Corona	
Wheatley Hills	Oyster Bay Branch	see North Roslyn	
Whitestone	Whitestone Branch	1869	1932
Whitestone Landing, also called Beechhurst Yacht Club	Whitestone Branch	1886	1932
Willow Tree	Main Line	March 1, 1837	c. 1872
Winfield Junction	Port Washington Branch	1854	1929
Woodbury	Port Jefferson Branch	see Cold Spring Harbor	
Woodfield	Southern Hempstead Branch	1870	1879
Woodhaven, earlier Woodville	Atlantic Branch	1848	1939
Woodhaven Junction	Atlantic Branch and Rockaway Beach Branch	1886	1977
Woodhull Park	Main Line	1890	1906
World's Fair	Port Washington Branch	see Mets – Willets Point	
Wreck Lead	Long Beach Branch	1888	1927
Yaphank	Greenport Branch	1844	2026
Youngsport	Montauk Branch	see Great River	

== See also ==
- History of the Long Island Rail Road
- Long Island Rail Road Rolling Stock
