= Ridgewood Station =

Ridgewood Station may refer to:

== Railway stations ==
- Ridgewood station, a major New Jersey Transit rail station hub in Ridgewood, New Jersey
- Ridgewood station (Delaware, Lackawanna and Western Railroad), a platform on the Newark and Bloomfield Railroad in modern-era Glen Ridge, New Jersey
- Ridgewood station (LIRR Babylon Branch), renamed Wantagh, a station on the Long Island Rail Road
- Ridgewood station (LIRR Evergreen Branch), a station on the Long Island Rail Road
- Ridgewood station (LIRR Lower Montauk), a station on the Long Island Rail Road
