= Grand Street station (LIRR Evergreen Branch) =

Train station in New York City (1878–85)

Grand Street

General information
- Location: Metropolitan Avenue and Grand Street; East Williamsburg, Brooklyn, New York
- Coordinates: 40.714212°N 73.932040°W
- Line: Evergreen Branch
- Platforms: 2 island platforms
- Tracks: 2

History
- Opened: May 15, 1878
- Closed: September 28, 1885

Former services
Preceding station	Long Island Rail Road	Following station
Humboldt Street toward Greenpoint	Evergreen Branch	South Side Railroad Crossing toward Cooper Avenue
Location

Grand Street was a train station along the Evergreen Branch of the Long Island Rail Road. The station was built on May 15, 1878 by the South Side Railroad of Long Island between Metropolitan Avenue and Grand Street (Brooklyn) at the East River Ferry. From the Greenpoint Terminal it took 10 minutes to get here. Grand Street was closed on September 28, 1885.
