= Glen Cove station =

Long Island Rail Road station in Nassau County, New York

Glen Cove
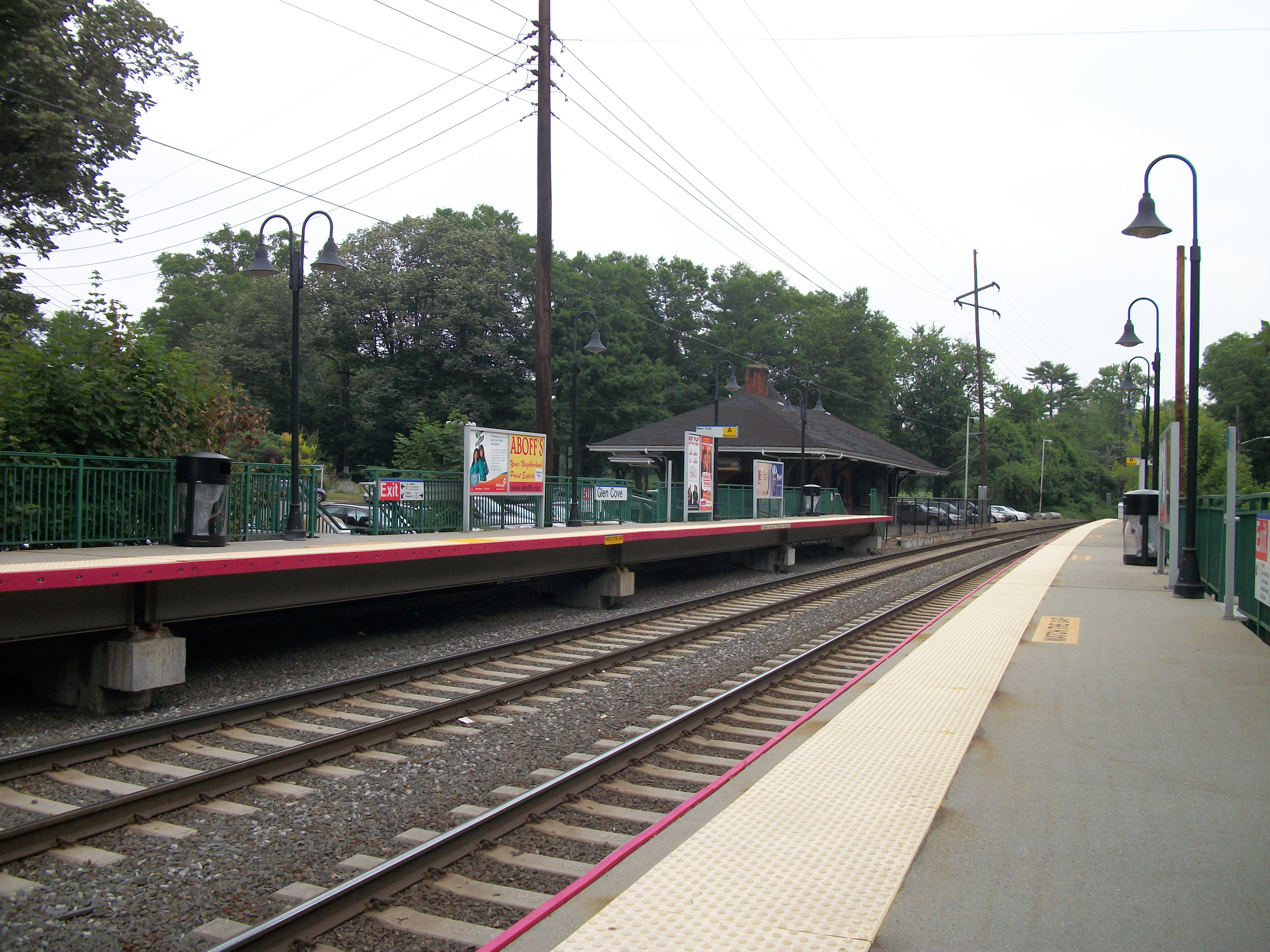
- Glen Cove station as seen on June 10, 2010

General information
- Location: Duck Pond Road & Pearsall Avenue; Glen Cove, NY
- Coordinates: 40.865189°N 73.616976°W
- Owner: Long Island Rail Road
- Line: Oyster Bay Branch
- Distance: 27.9 mi (44.9 km) from Long Island City
- Platforms: 2 side platforms
- Tracks: 2
- Connections: Mid Island Taxi

Construction
- Parking: Yes
- Cycle facilities: Yes
- Accessible: yes

Other information
- Station code: GCV
- Fare zone: 7

History
- Opened: 1895
- Former names: Nassau (1895–June 28, 1911)

Passengers
- 2012—2014: 435 per weekday

Services
Preceding station	Long Island Rail Road	Following station
Glen Street toward Penn Station, Jamaica or Long Island City	Oyster Bay Branch	Locust Valley toward Oyster Bay
Location

Glen Cove is a station along the Oyster Bay Branch of the Long Island Rail Road. It is located between Pearsall Avenue and Norfolk Lane north of Duck Pond Road, in Glen Cove, Nassau County, New York.

No bus services are available at this station (unlike at the nearby Glen Street station). However, local taxicabs do stop here.

== History ==
The Glen Cove station opened in 1895 as Nassau station, at the behest of the "Gold Coast" millionaires. These wealthy locals, such as the Charles Pratt and J.P. Morgan, who were looking for a more dignified station to disembark at than the existing station on Glen Street. The picturesque station has been featured in several movies, including Sabrina, Hello Again, and several commercials.

== Station layout ==
This station has two high-level side platforms, each four cars long.

== See also ==
- Long Island Rail Road stations
- Glen Street station
- Sea Cliff station
