= Sea Cliff station =

Long Island Rail Road station in Nassau County, New York

Sea Cliff
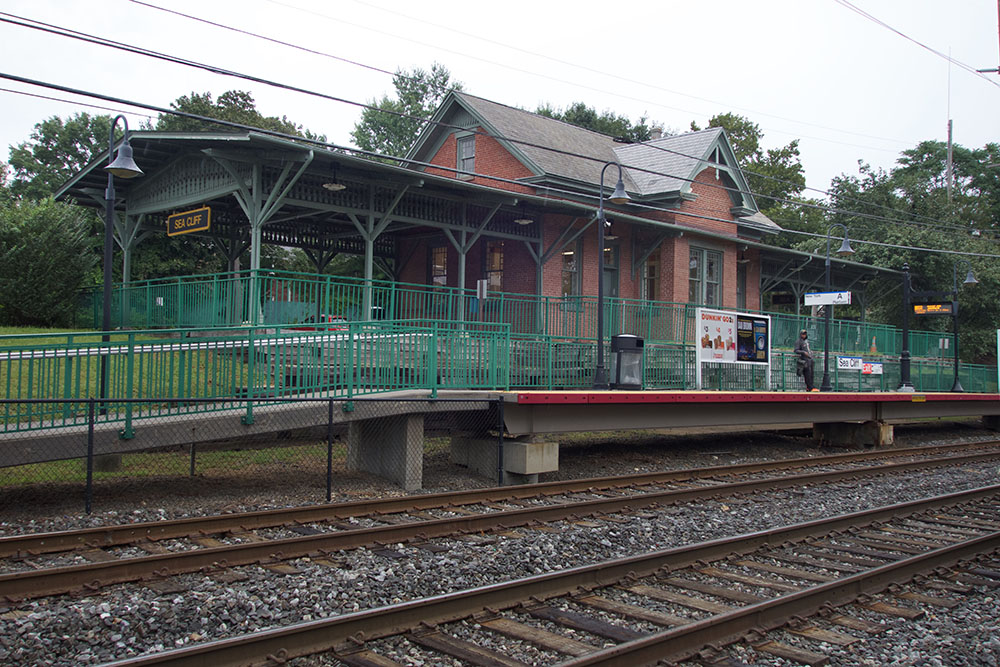
- The station in 2018

General information
- Location: Sea Cliff Avenue & Glen Keith Road; Glen Cove, NY
- Owner: Long Island Rail Road
- Line: Oyster Bay Branch
- Distance: 26.7 mi (43.0 km) from Long Island City
- Platforms: 2 side platforms
- Tracks: 3
- Connections: Nassau Inter-County Express: n27 Glen Cove Bus: Glen Cove Commuter Bus

Construction
- Parking: Yes
- Cycle facilities: Yes; bike rack
- Accessible: Yes

Other information
- Station code: SCF
- Fare zone: 7

History
- Opened: 1867
- Rebuilt: 1888, 1997

Passengers
- 2012–2014: 519 per weekday

Services
Preceding station	Long Island Rail Road	Following station
Glen Head toward Penn Station, Jamaica or Long Island City	Oyster Bay Branch	Glen Street toward Oyster Bay
- Sea Cliff Railroad Station
- U.S. National Register of Historic Places
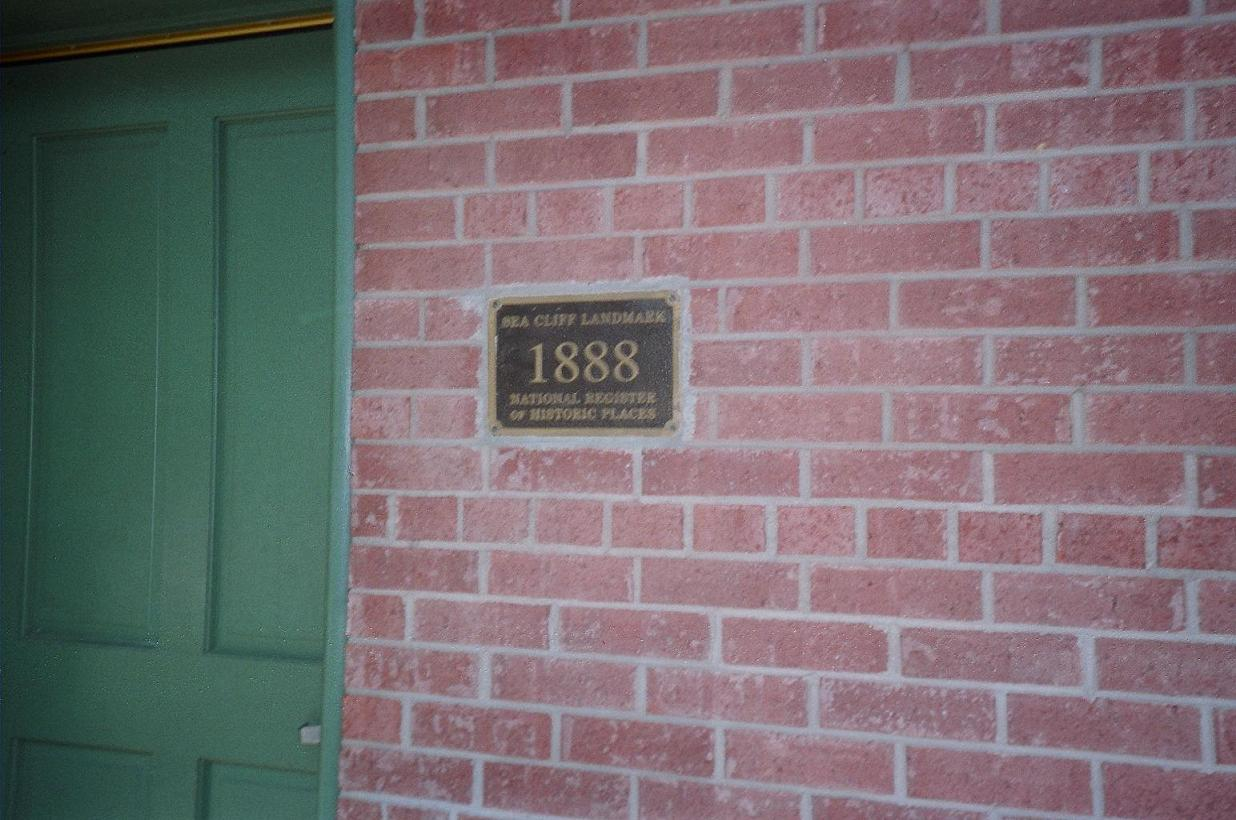
- NRHP landmark, rebuilt in 1888.
- Location: Sea Cliff, New York, USA
- Nearest city: Glen Cove, New York
- Coordinates: 40°51′9.23″N 73°37′31.47″W
- Built: 1888
- Architectural style: Late-Victorian
- NRHP reference No.: 88000021
- Added to NRHP: February 18, 1988
Location

Sea Cliff is a station on the Oyster Bay Branch of the Long Island Rail Road. It is located on Sea Cliff Avenue and Glen Keith Road, between Glen Cove Avenue and Cedar Swamp Road, in the City of Glen Cove, in Nassau County, New York, United States.

== History ==
The Sea Cliff station was built in 1867 by the Glen Cove Branch Rail Road, and was reconstructed in May 1888 at the cost of $4,000 (1888 USD). The station is typical of many LIRR stations of the late-Victorian era. It contains a two-story red brick structure with a gabled-roof that extended into canopies on the sides, which contains elaborate gingerbread woodwork along the canopies.

From July 2, 1902 to December 31, 1924, the Sea Cliff station had connections to two trolley lines. One was the Sea Cliff Village Trolley, owned by the Nassau County Railway and the other was the Glen Cove Railroad (not to be confused with the old LIRR subsidiary) which ran along the Oyster Bay Branch right-of-way into Downtown Glen Cove in 1905. From 1909 to 1956, it also contained a wooden pedestrian bridge.

On February 18, 1988, roughly a century after the second station was erected, the station house at the Sea Cliff station was listed on the National Register of Historic Places, thus making it a designated landmark.

The Sea Cliff station underwent a major renovation in 1997, during which time the station's current high-level platforms were added and station was made compliant with the Americans with Disabilities Act of 1990. The new platforms additionally made the station compatible with the railroad's new C3 bilevel railcars.

== Station layout ==
This station has two high-level side platforms, each four cars long. There is a spur east of the station for track maintenance equipment, but was used as a freight siding until the 1970s. The siding at one point crossed Sea Cliff Avenue to service Sea Cliff Coal and Lumber, whose covered coal dump still stands.

== See also ==
- List of Long Island Rail Road stations
- Glen Cove station
- Glen Street station
