= Myrtle Avenue station (LIRR Evergreen Branch) =

Train station in New York City (1878–82)

Myrtle Avenue

General information
- Location: Myrtle Avenue and Gates Avenue; Bushwick, Brooklyn, New York
- Coordinates: 40.699412°N 73.912185°W
- Line: Evergreen Branch
- Platforms: 2 island platforms
- Tracks: 2

History
- Opened: May 16, 1878
- Closed: May 1882

Former services
Preceding station	Long Island Rail Road	Following station
Ridgewood toward Greenpoint	Evergreen Branch	Base Ball Grounds toward Cooper Avenue
Location

Myrtle Avenue was a train station along the Evergreen Branch of the Long Island Rail Road. The station opened on May 16, 1878, at Myrtle Avenue and Gates Avenue. From the Greenpoint Terminal it took 18 minutes to get here and Myrtle Avenue was 3.26 miles away from Greenpoint Terminal. The station was located under the present-day Myrtle Avenue El. The station closed with the end of passenger service in May 1882.
