= Mastic station =

Former train station in New York, US

Mastic
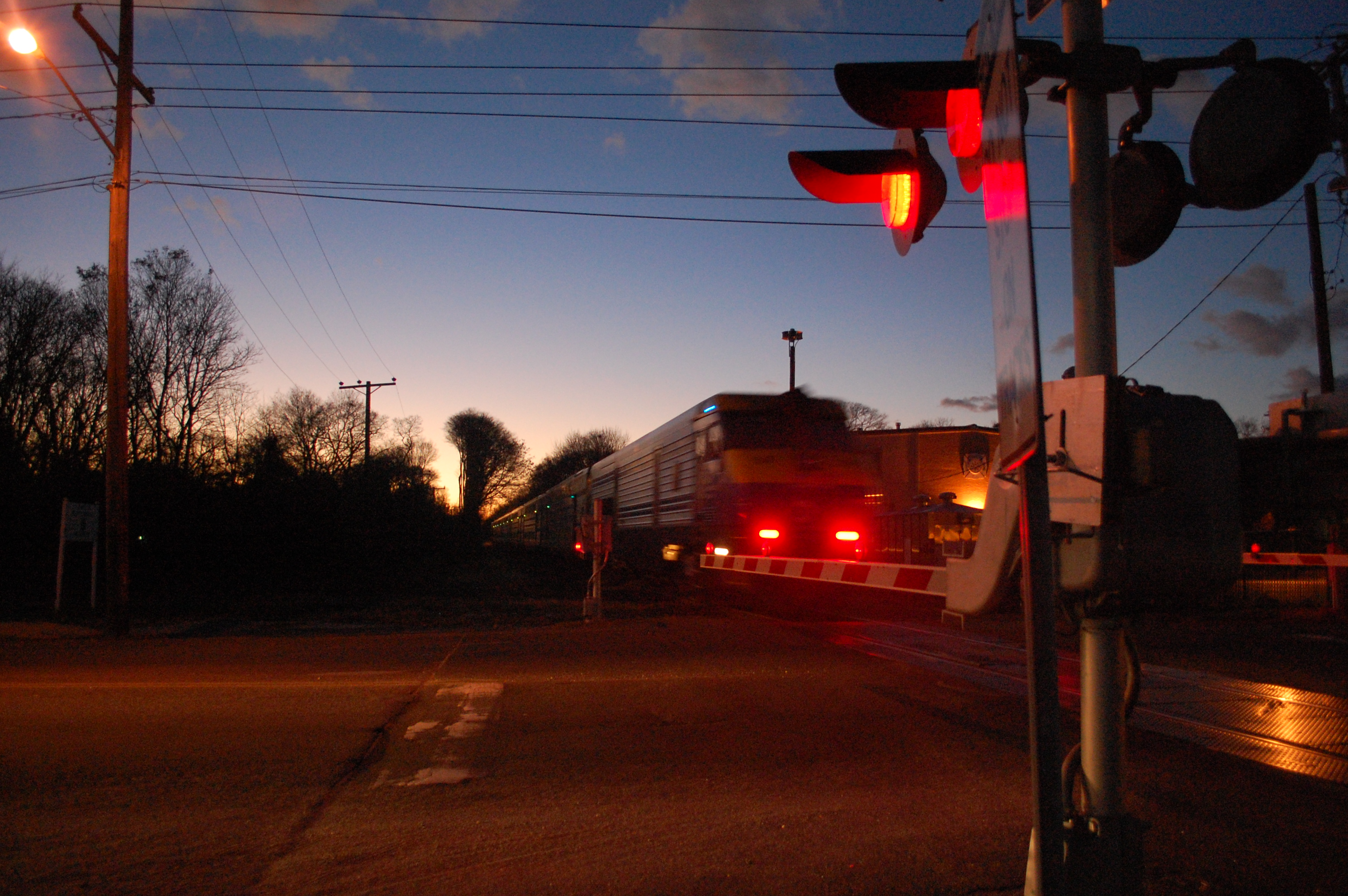
- LIRR diesel train at the site of the former Mastic station

General information
- Location: Mastic Road and Mastic Boulevard; Mastic, New York
- Coordinates: 40.8018951°N 72.8396715°W
- Owner: Long Island Rail Road

History
- Opened: 1882
- Closed: July 7, 1960
- Former names: Forge (1882–1893)

Former services
Preceding station	Long Island Rail Road	Following station
Brookhaven toward Long Island City	Montauk Division	Center Moriches toward Montauk
Location

Mastic was a station stop along the Montauk Branch of the Long Island Rail Road in Mastic, New York, located on the northeast corner of the Mastic Road grade crossing.

== History ==
Mastic station was originally built by the Brooklyn and Montauk Railroad as Forge Station around 1882, and renamed Mastic around 1893 following the renaming of the hamlet of Forge. It contained both a passenger and freight/express depot. When Brookhaven station was eliminated by the Long Island Rail Road on October 6, 1958, Mastic station was one of two stations recommended for use as a substitute by the patrons of the now-closed station. The other was Bellport station. However, this substitute was short-lived because Mastic station finally closed on July 7, 1960, as the new Mastic-Shirley station opened 7,010 feet west at the William Floyd Parkway grade crossing on the same date. The depot was razed in August 1960, despite efforts by local residents of Mastic, Mastic Acres, Mastic Beach and Mastic Park to keep it intact.
