= Humboldt Street station =

Train station in New York City (1878–85)

Humboldt Street

General information
- Location: Meeker Avenue between Humboldt Street and Graham Street; Williamsburg, Brooklyn, New York
- Coordinates: 40.718869°N 73.944444°W
- Line: Evergreen Branch
- Platforms: 2 island platforms
- Tracks: 2

History
- Opened: May 15, 1878
- Closed: September 28, 1885

Former services
Preceding station	Long Island Rail Road	Following station
Fifth Street toward Greenpoint	Evergreen Branch	Grand Street toward Cooper Avenue
Location

Humboldt Street was a train station along the Evergreen Branch of the Long Island Rail Road. The station was originally built on May 15, 1878. The platform area extended between Humboldt Street and Graham Street.

== History ==
Humboldt Street was .99 miles from the terminal at Greenpoint and the fare was 5 cents. From the Greenpoint Terminal it took 6 minutes to get here. A Mr. Sherman was the ticket agent and his office, café, and summer garden were at Graham Avenue and Skillman Street. Many of the trains on the Evergreen Branch that ran on weekends were express trains making limited stops between Greenpoint and Bay Ridge. This was a source of annoyance for people at the stations that were skipped. The railroad tried to fix this problem by making the local stops flag stops. This didn't always solve the problem as there is one account of a large crowd waiting for a beach train at Humboldt St that almost rioted on August 11, 1878. This was because several express trains had passed, but no local stops were made. The people on the platforms waiting for the train were angry and threatened to tear down the waiting rooms, and in response an agent was sent to the station house for assistance. Several policemen were sent to the station to calm the crowd until the train came.

On July 4, 1883, a Greenpoint train struck a Calvary Cemetery open horse car #42 at the nearby Humboldt Street crossing. Cars were smashed and there was one fatality. Humboldt Street was closed on September 28, 1885, and in later years it became a carpenters shop.
