= Glen Street station =

Long Island Rail Road station in Nassau County, New York

Glen Street
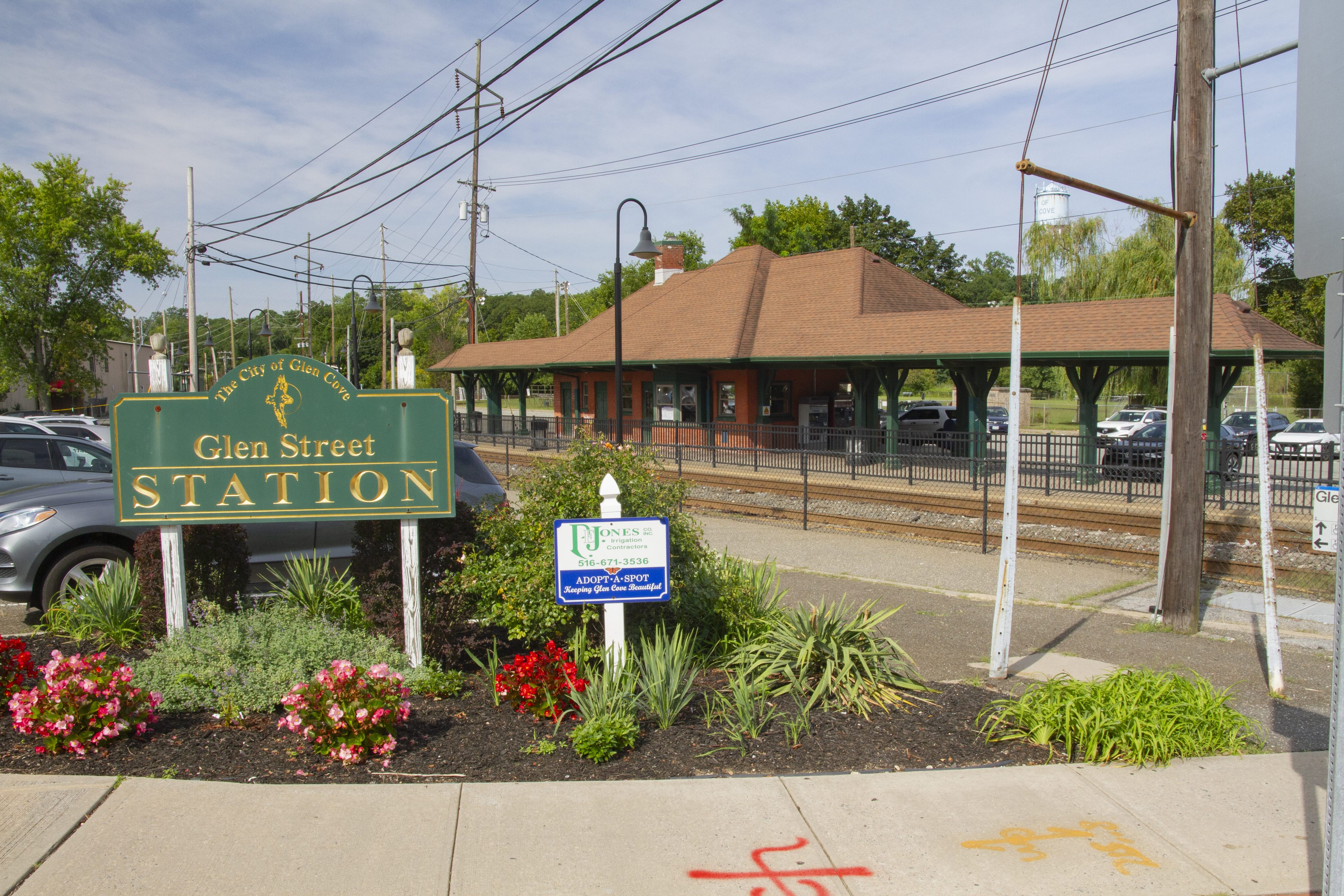
- The Glen Street station in 2023

General information
- Location: Glen Street; Glen Cove, New York
- Coordinates: 40.857862°N 73.621461°W
- Owner: Long Island Rail Road
- Line: Oyster Bay Branch
- Distance: 27.3 mi (43.9 km) from Long Island City
- Platforms: 2 side platforms
- Tracks: 2
- Connections: Nassau Inter-County Express: n21, n27

Construction
- Parking: Yes
- Cycle facilities: Yes
- Accessible: Yes

Other information
- Station code: GST
- Fare zone: 7

History
- Opened: May 16, 1867
- Rebuilt: 1888
- Former names: Glen Cove (1867–June 28, 1911)

Passengers
- 2012—2014: 476 per weekday

Services
Preceding station	Long Island Rail Road	Following station
Sea Cliff toward Penn Station, Jamaica or Long Island City	Oyster Bay Branch	Glen Cove toward Oyster Bay
Location

Glen Street (formerly Glen Cove) is a station on the Oyster Bay Branch of the Long Island Rail Road. It is located on Glen Street (the former alignment of New York State Route 107), near Elm Avenue, in the City of Glen Cove, in Nassau County, New York, United States.

== History ==
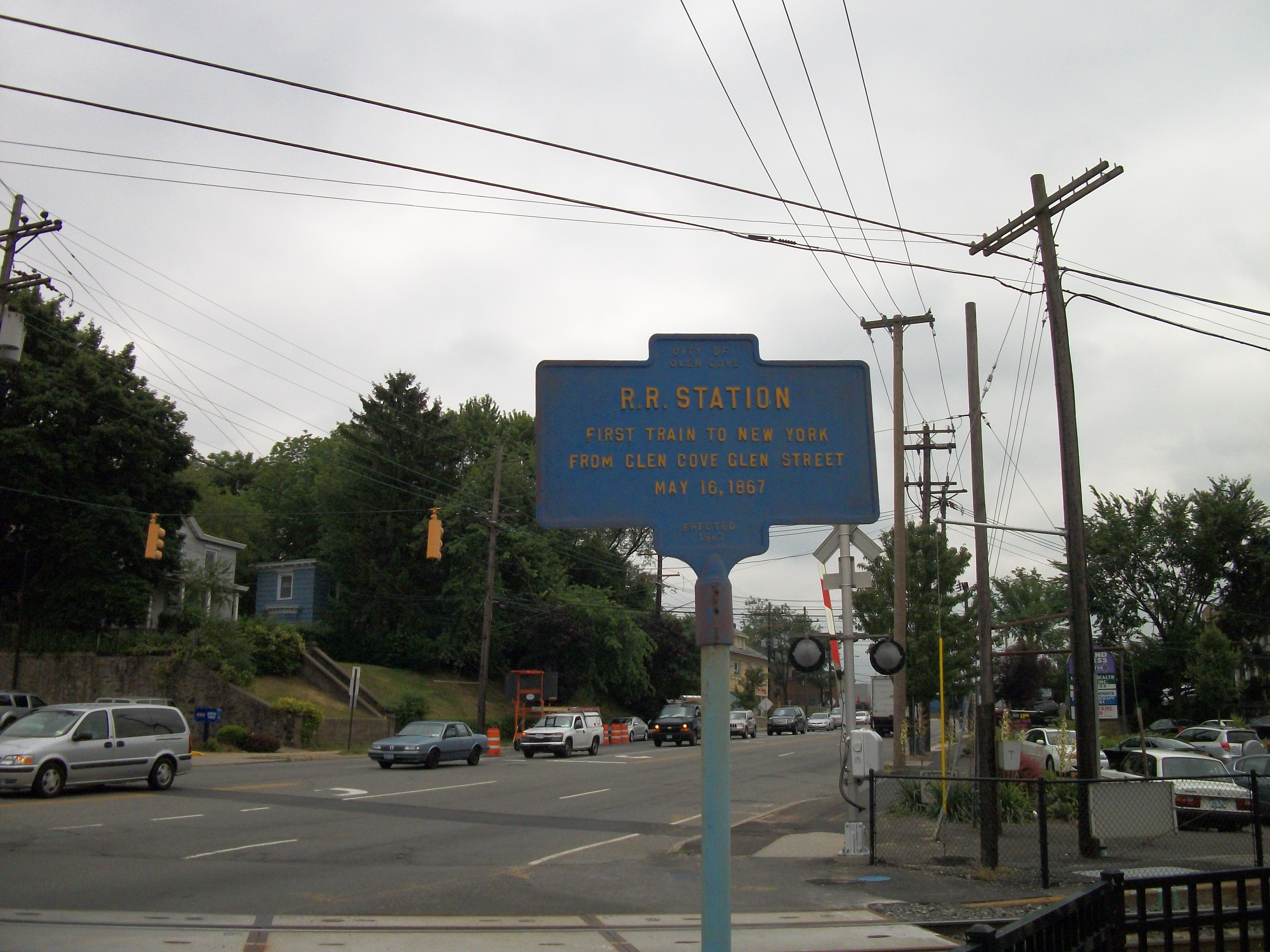
The Glen Street station's historic marker.

Glen Street station was built by the Glen Cove Branch Rail Road (an LIRR subsidiary) and opened on May 16, 1867, as the original Glen Cove Station, having finally reached the intended destination of the railroad's namesake. It was the terminus of the branch until the line was extended to Locust Valley in 1869. The first incarnation of this station was located to the northwest of the current station on the land now occupied by a Burger King. It was replaced by the current station in 1888.

In 1895, the current Glen Cove station was constructed further north, at the behest of the "Gold Coast" millionaires (such as the Pratts and J.P. Morgan), who felt that the Glen Street station was not dignified enough for them to utilize. Following that station's opening, this station was renamed as Glen Street.

While the Glen Street station's station house is not listed on the National Register of Historic Places like nearby Sea Cliff LIRR station, it has been listed & designated as a New York State Historic Site since 1967.

== Station layout ==
This station has two high-level side platforms, each long enough for one and a half cars to receive and discharge passengers. A small freight yard existed south of the station, which is now occupied by a commercial gym.

== See also ==
- Long Island Rail Road stations
- Glen Cove station
- Sea Cliff station
