= Ridgewood station (LIRR Evergreen Branch) =

Train station in New York City (1878–94)

Ridgewood
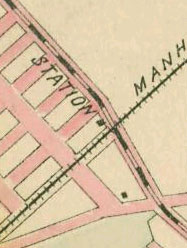
- 1891 Map of the station

General information
- Location: DeKalb Avenue between Irving Avenue and Wyckoff Avenue; Bushwick, Brooklyn, New York
- Coordinates: 40.703678°N 73.919847°W
- Line: Evergreen Branch
- Platforms: 2 island platforms
- Tracks: 2

History
- Opened: July 14, 1878
- Closed: 1894
- Former names: DeKalb Avenue

Former services
Preceding station	Long Island Rail Road	Following station
South Side Railroad Crossing toward Greenpoint	Evergreen Branch	Myrtle Avenue toward Cooper Avenue
Location

Ridgewood (formerly known as DeKalb Avenue) was a train station in New York along the Evergreen Branch of the Long Island Rail Road. The station opened on July 14, 1878. DeKalb Avenue was renamed Ridgewood in June 1882. From the Greenpoint Terminal it took 15 minutes to get here. The station closed with the end of passenger service in 1894.
