= Evergreen Branch =

Former Long Island Rail Road branch

- Maximum extent of the Evergreen Branch (1878-1883)

Overview
- Status: Abandoned
- Owner: Long Island Rail Road
- Locale: Brooklyn, New York, USA
- Termini: Greenpoint; Cooper Avenue
- Stations: 8

Service
- System: Long Island Rail Road
- Operator: Long Island Rail Road

History
- Opened: 1874
- Closed: 1984

Technical
- Number of tracks: 2
- Track gauge: 4 ft 8 1/2 in (1,435 mm)

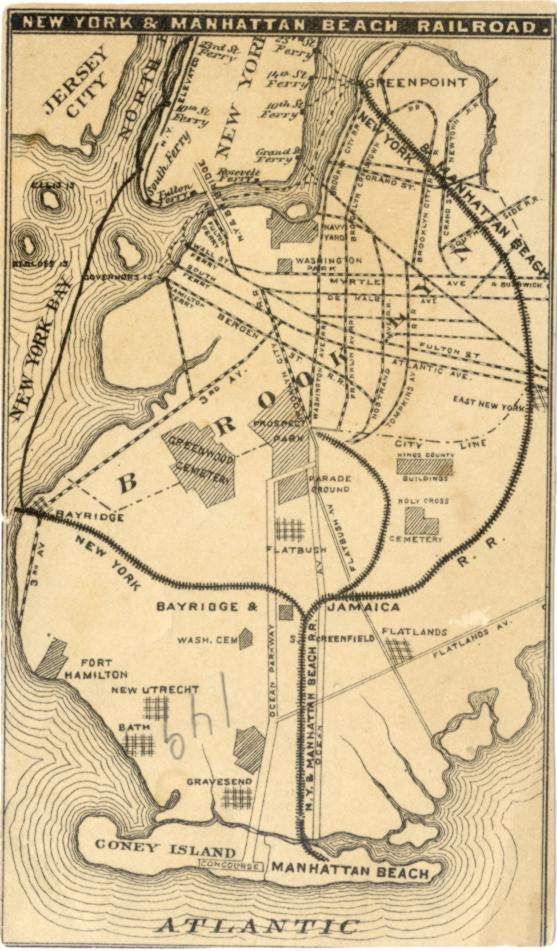
This map from 1878 shows the Evergreen Branch when it was used for service to Manhattan Beach. The branch is located on the northeast portion of the map.

The Evergreen Branch was a branch of the Long Island Rail Road (LIRR) that ran in Brooklyn and part of Queens in New York City. The line, at its fullest extent, ran between Greenpoint, Brooklyn and Ridgewood, Queens. The line consisted of two leased portions. The first portion, between Greenpoint and Jefferson Street, was leased from the Glendale and East River Railroad. The second portion, from Jefferson Street to Ridgewood, was leased from the Brooklyn and Rockaway Beach Railroad Company, and was known as the Evergreen Branch, a name later extended to the rest of the line.

The Glendale and East River Railroad was incorporated in 1874 to give the South Side Railroad an additional waterfront terminal, but was instead used to connect Austin Corbin's New York and Manhattan Beach Railroad to New York City via ferry service from Greenpoint. The Evergreen Branch opened in 1878, with service only running during the summer season from May to September. In 1876, it was consolidated into the LIRR, and service to Greenpoint was replaced with service to Long Island City instead, with a shuttle allowing passengers from Greenpoint to get to Manhattan Beach. The line was converted to standard gauge to allow for the transferring of freight along the line. Passenger service ended in May 1886, and freight service ended four years later. The right-of-way between Greenpoint and South Side Crossing was abandoned in 1896 and 1897, with few traces of that branch left.

With passenger service over, the remainder of the line between South Side Crossing and Cooper Avenue became exclusively used for freight. In 1939, the section of the line between Himrod Street and Starr Street was removed. While the LIRR was sold in 1966 to New York State, the branch was kept as part of the Pennsylvania Railroad, and through corporate changes became part of Conrail. In 1984, Conrail was granted permission to abandon the branch. While parts of the branch's right-of-way have been built upon in recent years, parking lots, newer buildings, and old rails, show where the line formerly went.

== Etymology ==
The Evergreen Branch is named after the surrounding area known as Evergreen. The area was settled in 1853 and was originally known as South Williamsburgh. South Williamsburgh and other surrounding areas gradually came to be known as Ridgewood. In order to distinguish itself, sometime around 1890, the local community renamed itself Evergreen after the nearby Cemetery of the Evergreens. In 1910, the surrounding area was officially named Ridgewood.

== Route description ==
The Evergreen Branch's original northern terminal was at Quay Street in Greenpoint along the East River, where passengers transferred to and from ferries to Manhattan. The line then ran southwest along North 15th Street to Richardson Street, and east along Richardson Street to Vandervoort Avenue where it turned southeast. From there, it crossed Metropolitan Avenue, Grand Street, and a portion of the Newtown Creek with a small bridge. After that, the line crossed over the South Side Railroad's Bushwick Branch and Varick Avenue, before continuing across Johnson Avenue. For a majority of the rest of the line, it ran east between Wyckoff Avenue and Irving Avenue. Up to Himrod Street, diamond railroad crossing signs indicated the line's presence. The line's grade crossings between Himrod Street and Palmetto Avenue had an unusual arrangement: instead of having crossing gates being across the streets to protect the tracks, the gates were across the tracks, protecting the streets. The tracks dipped slightly southward at Cornelia Street before going back to the regular alignment. From there, the line proceeded southeast and connected with the Bay Ridge Branch at Cooper Avenue Junction near the Cemetery of the Evergreens.

== History ==
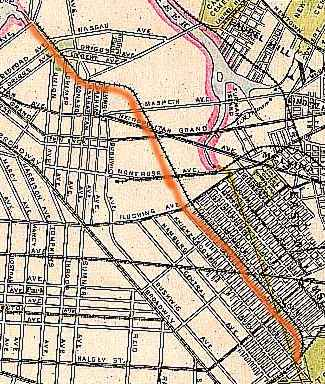
A map from Beers Atlas, from the 1870s, showing the line's route.

The origin of the Evergreen Branch traces back to the Glendale and East River Railroad (G&ER), which was incorporated on March 26, 1874, to build a railroad from Quay Street in Greenpoint, Brooklyn to Huntington on Long Island, running through Glendale, Queens. It was incorporated to give an additional terminal on the East River to the South Side Railroad. The line was no longer needed once the South Side was bought by Conrad Poppenhusen. The idea for a line to Greenpoint reemerged when Austin Corbin proposed the New York & Manhattan Beach Railway Company (NY&MB) to connect his resorts in Manhattan Beach with New York City via ferry service in Greenpoint. On April 3, 1878, he leased the G&ER to serve as the northern portion of his line, and to bridge the gap between that line and his line in East New York, the G&ER's southern terminus was extended from Jefferson Street to East New York. The charter of the Brooklyn and Rockaway Beach Railroad (part of the present-day BMT Canarsie Line), which gave its right to construct an extension to Hunter's Point to the NY&MB, allowed for the extension to be completed. The route for the extension, which came to be known as the Evergreen Branch, was approved on February 20, 1877. The line was graded in 1877 and the tracks were mostly laid in early 1878. The line from East New York to Greenpoint opened at the beginning of the season on May 16, 1878. On this date, stations were also opened at Humboldt Street, Grand Street, and South Side Railroad Crossing, which was eliminated from timetables effective May 25, 1881. In spring 1879 the line was double tracked, and it was completed for the opening of the summer season on May 24.

After Corbin purchased the Long Island Rail Road (LIRR) in December 1880, the line was consolidated within the LIRR. Corbin, after the line's acquisition, was one of the tax directors of the G&ER. On May 1, 1882, the NY&MB was acquired by the New York, Brooklyn and Manhattan Beach Railroad (NYB&MB), transferring the lease of the G&ER's property. On that date, the NYB&MB leased its property and subleased the G&ER to the LIRR for 99 years. In February 1883, the Long Island City & Manhattan Beach Railroad Company was organized to build a standard-gauge line to connect the Brooklyn & Montauk Railroad with the Manhattan Beach Branch. The new line ran between from Cooper Avenue Junction to the Montauk Division at Fresh Pond, opening on June 2, 1883. Starting with the 1883 season, direct service to Manhattan Beach from Greenpoint was ended in favor of direct service from Long Island City as service to Greenpoint was still narrow-gauge. In order to maintain service to Greenpoint, a shuttle was operated to connect with the Manhattan Beach trains at Cooper Avenue Junction in Bushwick. Since it was no longer the main line, the line to Greenpoint became known as the Greenpoint Division. During the 1883 season, Long Island City and Greenpoint each received 25 trains on weekdays. Even with the high level of service to Greenpoint, the expensive ferry service was abandoned, requiring passengers to walk five blocks for the East 10th Street and East 23rd Street Ferries. In 1884, the LIRR contracted out work to rebuild the line as a standard-gauge line, requiring the complete rebuilding of the roadbed between Greenpoint and Cooper Avenue. The line was completely rebuilt the following year between Greenpoint to Cooper Avenue to allow standard gauge trains to use the line. This allowed for freight to serve the line, beginning its transition from a passenger line to a freight line.

In April 1886, service to Greenpoint was abandoned due to the expiration of the eight-year lease for the Quay Street station and facilities. The LIRR, with its new terminals at Flatbush Avenue and Long Island City available, did not see any reason to pay $6000 a year in rent for an unneeded facility. As a result, service on 2.33 miles (3.75 km) of the line, from Greenpoint to South Side Crossing ended on September 28, 1885, with the end of the 1885 season. In 1886, a Bushwick shuttle was instituted–running through the 1894 season. In 1891 and 1892 the Humboldt Street and Grand Street depots were sold, as well as some of the old rails. Between 1896 and 1897 the right of way between Greenpoint and South Side Crossing was abandoned and sold, leaving the portion between Jefferson Street and South Side Crossing as the only remaining portion of the G&ER. This portion of the G&ER was later considered as part of the Evergreen Branch.

While it was thought that there was no trace of the Greenpoint service to the west of South Side Crossing, an odd triangular lot exists at Leonard Street between Bayard Street and Richardson Street that was once part of the right-of-way. The two buildings adjacent to the lot are angled against where the tracks would have run, and tax map records show that this is lot is separated from nearby lots, and has never been developed upon–there only is a tree located at this location.

=== Decline ===
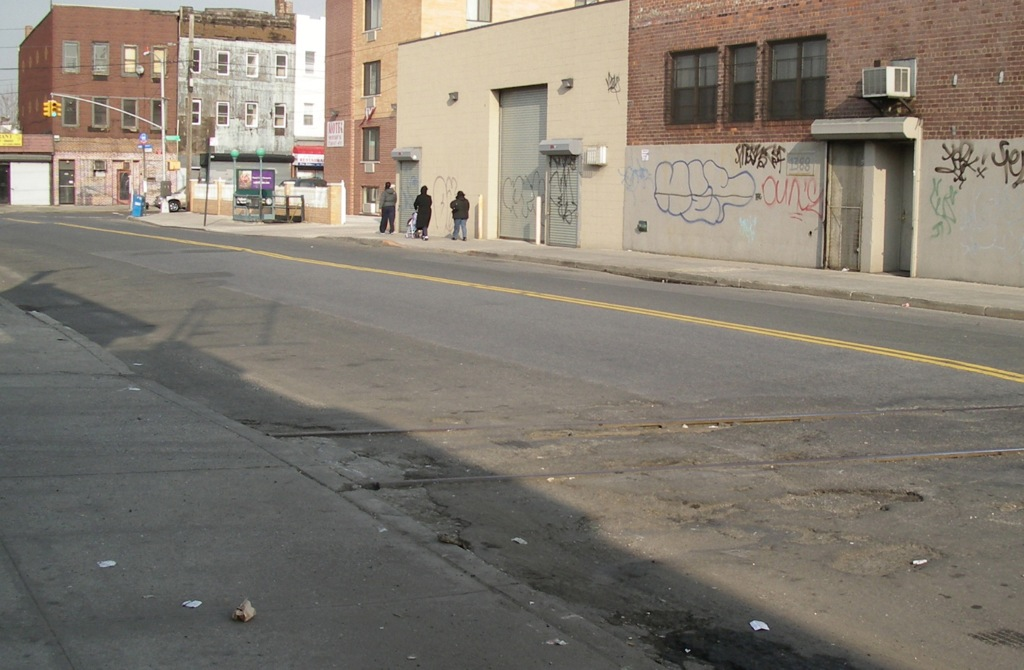
The remnants of the Evergreen Branch crossing Halsey Street in Bushwick.

In the early 1920s, the Brooklyn–Manhattan Transit Corporation (BMT) planned to construct a new transit line through northern Brooklyn: the 14th Street–Eastern Line. The line was to be constructed as a subway line to White Street, and then as an elevated line to East New York to connect with the Canarsie Line, using the Evergreen Branch's right-of-way. Since the right-of-way would have been used for subway service, freight service on the branch would have had to be discontinued. In 1924, due to community opposition, the BMT ultimately agreed to build the 14th Street–Eastern Line as a subway line under Wyckoff Avenue; this idea had been considered as far back as 1913.

Upon the dissolution of the Manhattan Beach Branch in 1924, the line became a freight spur between the Bushwick and Bay Ridge Branches in Brooklyn. Freight traffic started to significantly decline in 1938, and on February 9, 1939, eight blocks of track, totaling 1,834 feet (559 m), were removed between Starr and Himrod Streets. Further dismantling took place between 1957 and 1962 and throughout much of the late 20th century. On January 20, 1966, when the New York state government purchased the Long Island Rail Road, the Bay Ridge Branch and the Evergreen Branch (excluding the G&ER portion) remained part of the Pennsylvania Railroad. Subsequently, they became part of Penn Central and Conrail. The Evergreen Branch still served a few customers until the 1970s. Some of this property, such as a triangular lot at Flushing Avenue and Stewart Avenue, are still owned by the MTA. By 1972, the line was cut back to Grove Street.

By the late 1970s, the Cooper Junction end of the line only had one remaining customer: Tulnoy Lumber, located at Putnam Avenue. After this location was closed, Conrail filed to abandon the line on September 15, 1983. However, the Interstate Commerce Commission (ICC) postponed authorization for abandonment to review offers from the Long Island Rail Road and the New York State Department of Transportation (NYSDOT). Conrail filed to abandon the line as it was "earning insufficient revenues over the tracks." NYSDOT offered $2 million for the line, while the LIRR offered $3 million for the line. However, Conrail valued the line at $5,259,988. In 1984, the ICC approved Conrail's application for abandonment after the NYSDOT and the LIRR dropped out of the bidding. Soon after, it quickly sold every lot from Cooper Avenue to Putnam Avenue. While the Bay Ridge Branch was sold to the LIRR in 1984, the Evergreen Branch was not part of the transaction. The property that was owned by Tulnoy Lumber was sold to be used as the parking lot for Food Bazaar. Portions of the Evergreen Branch near the former location of the Cooper Avenue Junction are still owned by the Long Island Rail Road.

The line was out of service in January 1985. Since the line was abandoned, additional plots of land along the right-of-way have been built upon or used as parking lots. The remainder of the lots are vacant. A private development company bought several parcels of land along the line from Conrail in 1986. Some stretches of abandoned track persisted for several years: in 2000, the website Forgotten NY documented several instances of trackage that remained both on streets and in lots along the right-of-way. On Hancock Street southwest of Wyckoff Avenue, a railroad crossing sign remained through the early 2000s, despite there being no visible trackage on the street.

== Station list ==
| Miles | Name | Opened | Closed | Notes |
|---|---|---|---|---|
| 0 | Greenpoint | May 16, 1878 | September 28, 1885 | |
| 0.56 | Fifth Street | 1878 | 1879 | |
| 0.99 | Humboldt Street | May 16, 1878 | September 28, 1885 | |
| 1.75 | Grand Street | May 16, 1878 | September 28, 1885 | |
| 2.33 | South Side Railroad Crossing | May 16, 1878 June 1886 | May 25, 1881 1890 | Crossing with Bushwick Branch near Varick Avenue |
| | Ridgewood earlier DeKalb Avenue | July 14, 1878 | 1894 | Renamed Ridgewood in June 1882. |
| 3.26 | Myrtle Avenue | May 16, 1878 | May 1882 | |
| | Base Ball Grounds | 1885 | 1886 | Between Halsey and Schaeffer Streets (Wallace's Grounds/Ridgewood Base Ball Park) |
| 3.95 | Cooper Avenue | June 2, 1883 | 1894 | Opened as a transfer station to allow passengers from Greenpoint to get to Manhattan Beach. Located at the crossing with the Bay Ridge Branch; Also called Cooper Avenue Junction. |

== See also ==
- Bushwick Branch
- Manhattan Beach Branch
- Rail freight transportation in New York City and Long Island
