= Bellport station =

Long Island Rail Road station in Suffolk County, New York

Bellport
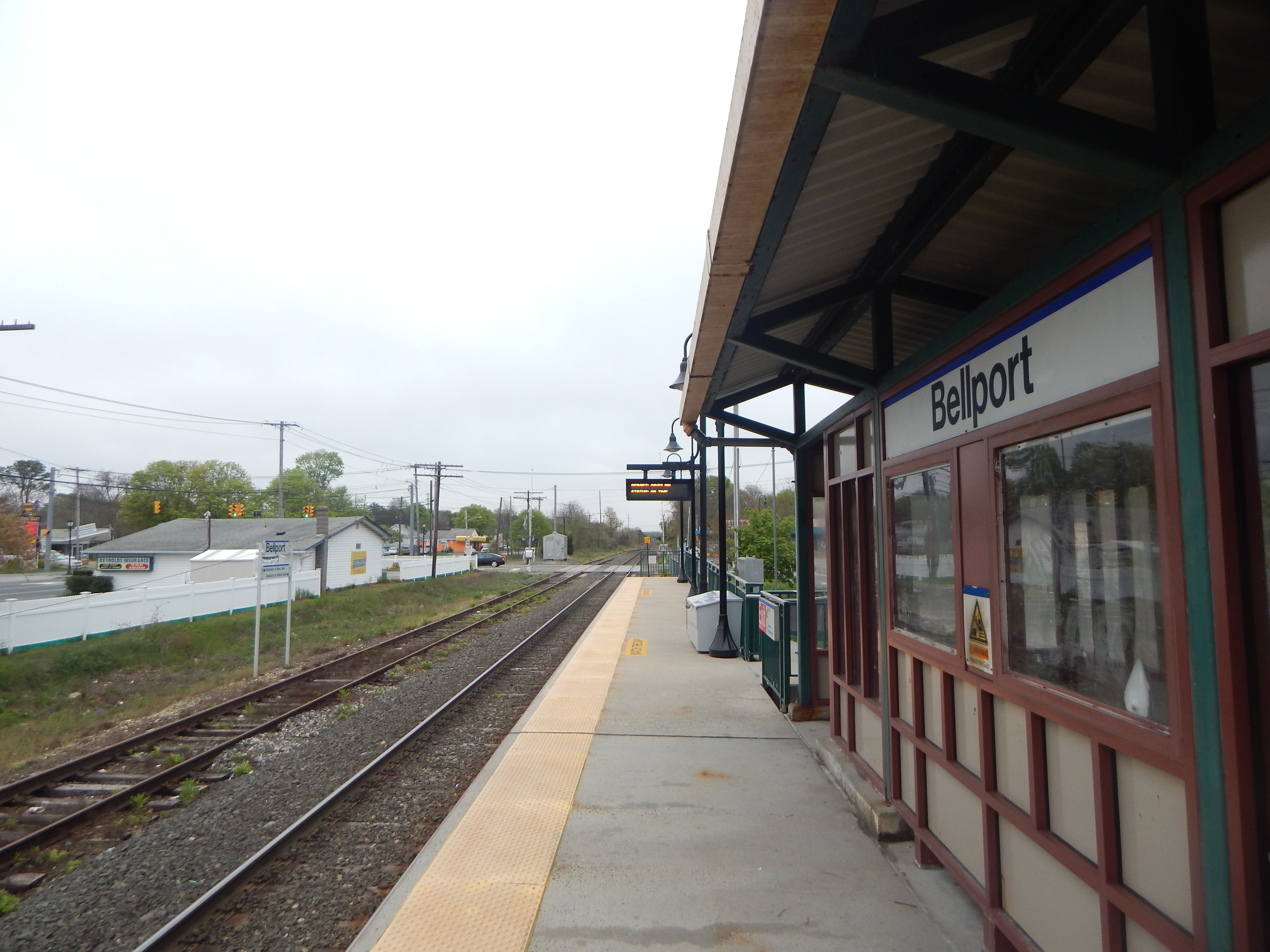
- The platform at the Bellport station in 2015

General information
- Location: Station Road & Montauk Highway; Bellport, New York
- Coordinates: 40.773717°N 72.943769°W
- Owner: Long Island Rail Road
- Platforms: 1 side platform
- Tracks: 2
- Connections: Suffolk County Transit: 66, South Country On Demand

Construction
- Parking: Yes
- Accessible: Yes

Other information
- Station code: BPT
- Fare zone: 12

History
- Opened: 1882
- Rebuilt: 1964, 1998

Passengers
- 2012—2014: 78
- Rank: 111 of 125

Services
Preceding station	Long Island Rail Road	Following station
Patchogue toward Penn Station or Long Island City	Montauk Branch limited service	Mastic–Shirley toward Montauk
Former services
Preceding station	Long Island Rail Road	Following station
Hagerman toward Long Island City	Montauk Division	Brookhaven toward Montauk
Location

Bellport is a station along the Montauk Branch of the Long Island Rail Road, located at Bellport Station Road and Montauk Highway in North Bellport, Suffolk County, New York.

== History ==
The Bellport station was originally built in the summer of 1882 by the Brooklyn and Montauk Railroad, an LIRR subsidiary designed to expand the former South Side Railroad of Long Island toward the east end. When Hagerman station was closed by the LIRR in 1929, the railroad advised travelers to use this station as a substitute. Twenty-nine years later, on October 6, 1958 the Brookhaven station was closed, sending commuters of that station here as well. Bellport's station house was closed in January 1959 and razed in May 1964, replaced with a shelter-shed.

The LIRR was planning to close this station on March 16, 1998 along with ten other stations due to low ridership, but decided to keep it open due to community opposition. A shelter with a high-level platform was built between 1998 and 1999, as many stations on the LIRR were getting at the time.

== Station layout ==
The station has one high-level platform on the south side of the two tracks, long enough for one and a half cars to receive and discharge passengers. The north track, not next to the platform, is a siding. Unlike other stations, this station has neither a ticket vending machine nor a ticket office.
