= Brookhaven station (LIRR) =

Former train station in New York, US

Brookhaven
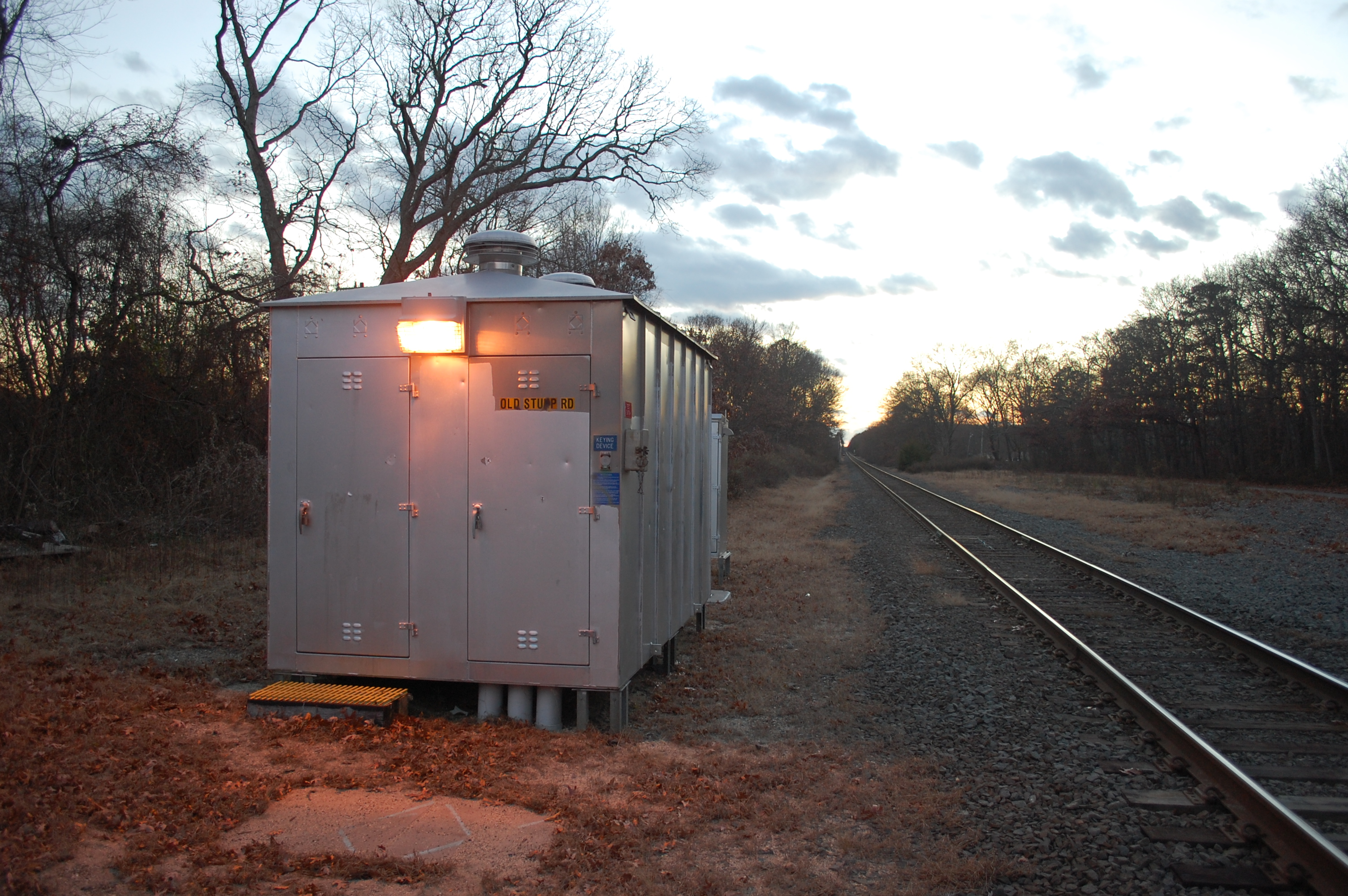
- Old Stump Road grade crossing is the site of the former LIRR Brookhaven station

General information
- Location: Railroad Avenue (now Old Stump Road) and Bridge Place; Brookhaven, New York
- Coordinates: 40.7854°N 72.9121°W
- Owner: Long Island Rail Road
- Platforms: 1 side platform
- Tracks: 1

Other information
- Station code: None
- Fare zone: 12

History
- Opened: 1884
- Closed: 1958

Former services
Preceding station	Long Island Rail Road	Following station
Bellport toward Long Island City	Montauk Division	Mastic toward Montauk
Location

Brookhaven was a station stop along the Montauk Branch of the Long Island Rail Road located at Bridge Street and Old Stump Road (former Suffolk County Route 21).

== History ==
It first opened around 1884 by the Brooklyn and Montauk Railroad. In May 1958, the Long Island Rail Road (LIRR) applied to the New York State Public Service Commission for permission to close Brookhaven, East Moriches, and Eastport. The LIRR sought to close the three stations due to very low ridership. A ridership survey conducted in September 1957 found no passengers at Brookhaven. The station closed on October 6, 1958. The former freight house has been moved to various private locations since 1958, and modified by each owner.
