= Fifth Street station (LIRR) =

Train station in New York City (1878–79)

Fifth Street

General information
- Location: Driggs Avenue between Lorimer Street and Union Avenue; Williamsburg, Brooklyn, New York
- Coordinates: 40.721599°N 73.950972°W
- Line: Evergreen Branch
- Platforms: 2 island platforms
- Tracks: 2

History
- Opened: 1878
- Closed: 1879

Former services
| Preceding station | Long Island Rail Road | Following station |
|---|---|---|
| Greenpoint Terminus | Evergreen Branch | Humboldt Street toward Cooper Avenue |
Location

Fifth Street was a train station along the Evergreen Branch of the Long Island Rail Road that opened in 1878 at Fifth Street, which later became Driggs Street and later Driggs Avenue. Fifth Street was three minutes away from Greenpoint Terminal. The station closed in 1879. This is evident as Fifth Street is not mentioned on the 1880 season timetable.
