= Greenpoint station =

Train station in New York City (1879–85)

Greenpoint

General information
- Location: Quay Street and Franklin Street; Greenpoint, Brooklyn, New York
- Coordinates: 40.725721°N 73.958704°W
- Line: Evergreen Branch
- Platforms: 1 island platforms
- Tracks: 2

History
- Opened: May 15, 1878
- Closed: September 28, 1885

Services
Preceding station	Long Island Rail Road	Following station
Terminus	Evergreen Branch	Fifth Street toward Cooper Avenue
Location

Greenpoint was the terminal train station for the Evergreen Branch of the Long Island Rail Road. Greenpoint station opened on May 15, 1879 and was located at the intersection of Quay Street and Franklin Street at Greenpoint. A ferry connected with trains at the station operating across the East River to 23rd Street in Manhattan. Greenpoint had one island platform. The station closed on September 28, 1885.
