= East Wind (train) =

Former passenger train in the United States

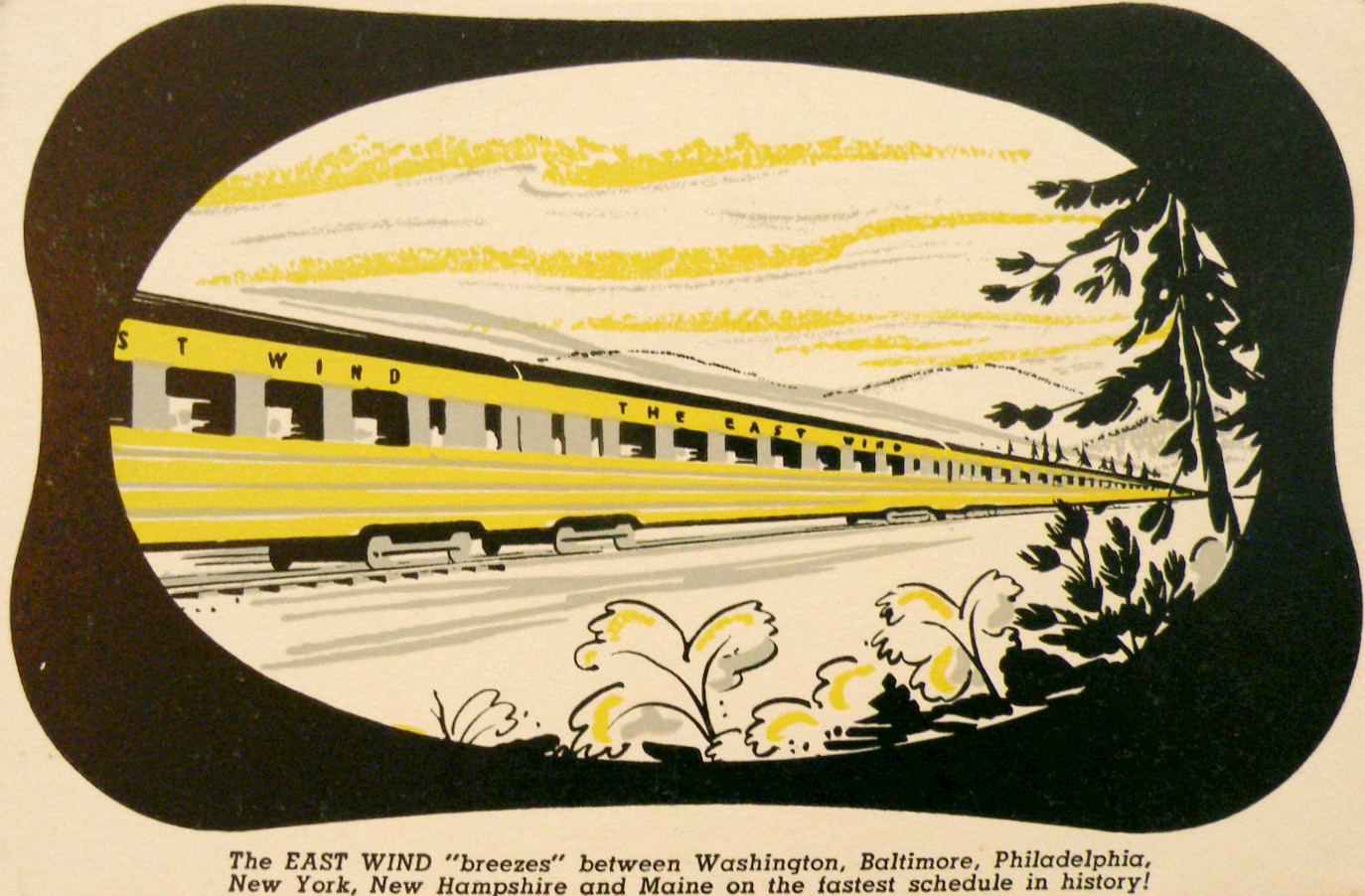
- Promotional postcard for the train

Overview
- Service type: Inter-city rail
- Status: Discontinued
- First service: 1940
- Last service: 1955
- Former operators: Pennsylvania Railroad; New Haven Railroad; Boston and Maine Railroad

Route
- Termini: Washington, D.C. Portland, Maine
- Distance travelled: 700 miles (1,100 km)
- Average journey time: 11.5 hours
- Service frequency: Daily summer only
- Train numbers: 120 (northbound), 121 (southbound)

On-board services
- Seating arrangements: air conditioned coaches
- Catering facilities: Dining car and parlor car

The East Wind was a summer passenger train between Washington, D.C., and resorts along the southern Maine coast. Travel time was about 11.5 hours over the 700-mile (1,100 km) route to Portland, Maine in 1941. Travel time was later reduced to 8 hours by 1955 although it terminated in New York City. The route was over the Pennsylvania Railroad from Washington through Philadelphia to New York City, then the New Haven Railroad to Groton, Connecticut, where it left the Northeast Corridor to reach the Boston and Maine Railroad at Worcester, Massachusetts, whereby it continued northeastward, bypassing Boston. The train continued over the Boston & Maine to Portland, where a coach and diner continued to Bangor, Maine, on the connecting Pine Tree Limited. In contrast to the other Mid-Atlantic to Maine trains, it was the only day and evening train.

== History ==
Service started in June 1940 with two sets of pooled passenger cars painted yellow with a silver window band and pinstripes. Each train had an arch-roof baggage car, a dining car, and as many as eight lightweight coaches. The New Haven and Boston & Maine provided American Flyer coaches built in the 1930s by the Pullman Company's former Osgood Bradley Car Company plant in Worcester. The New Haven provided a similar grill car, while the Pennsylvania Railroad provided P-70 coaches and a lounge car. The train did not run during the summers of 1943, 1944 and 1945.

Service resumed in the summer of 1946 without the distinctive paint scheme of the earlier years. Instead of turning north at Groton on the Norwich Branch, the train now passed through Providence, Rhode Island, and used the Providence and Worcester Railroad to reach Worcester. From 1953 to 1955, the train ran via Hartford, Willimantic, and Putnam. Dining cars were sometimes leased from the Atlantic Coast Line Railroad, or Boston and Maine or New Haven heavyweight diners were used. The New Haven diners were sometimes painted silver. The train ran for the last time in the summer of 1955, ending earlier than planned after Hurricane Diane caused significant flooding throughout New England on August 18.

Guilford Rail System used the name East Wind in 1995 for a through piggyback service of semi-trailers on flatcars between Springfield, Massachusetts, and Bangor, Maine.
