= Alstom PL42AC =

Model of diesel-electric locomotives built by Alstom

PL42AC
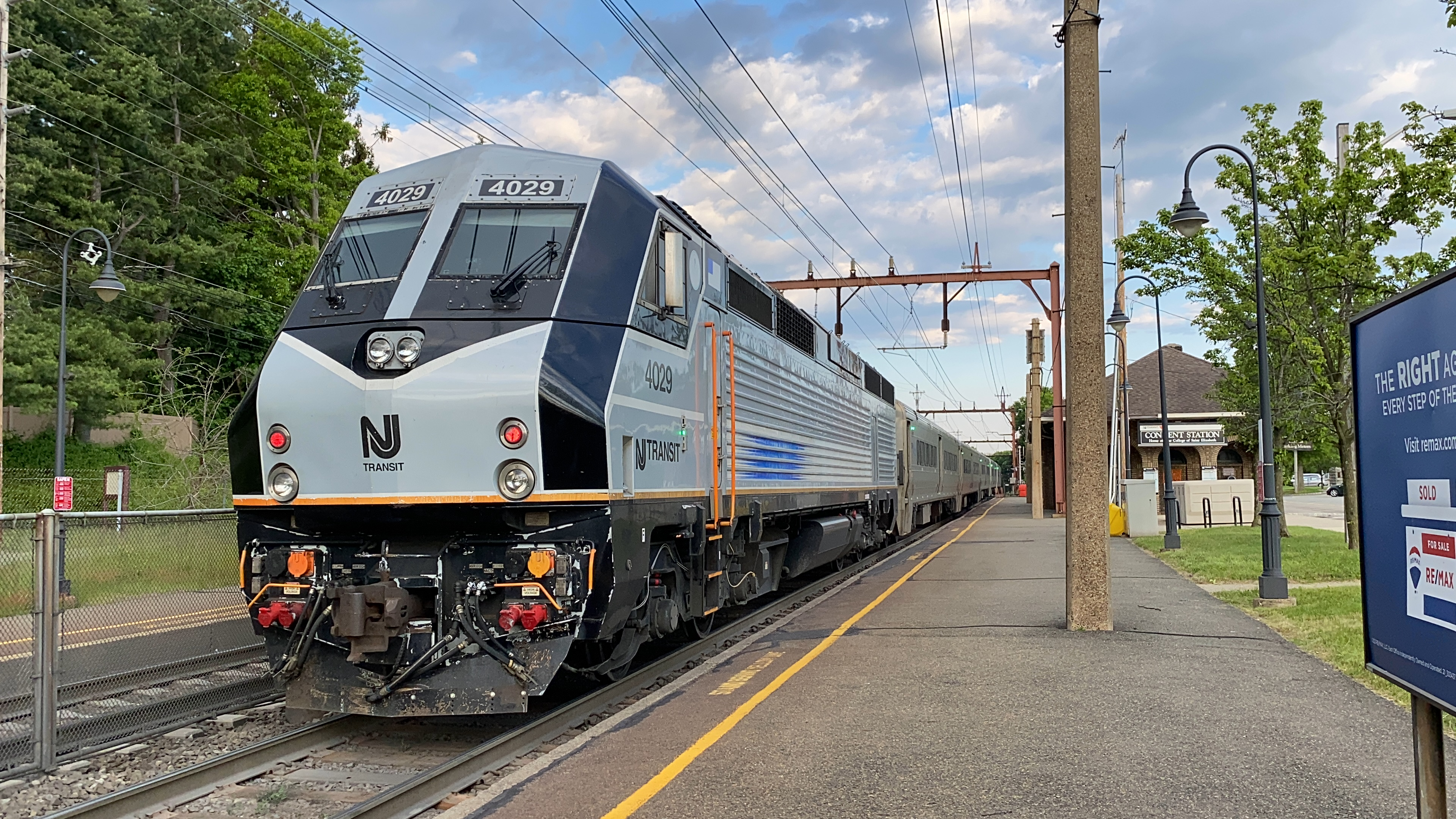
- New Jersey Transit PL42AC #4029 at Convent Station
Type and origin
- Power type: Diesel-electric
- Builder: Alstom, EMD
- Model: PL42AC
- Build date: 2003–2006
- Total produced: 33
Specifications
- Configuration
  - AAR: B-B
  - UIC: Bo′Bo′
- Gauge: 4 ft 8 1/2 in (1,435 mm) standard gauge
- Wheel diameter: 42 in (1,067 mm)
- Length: 69 ft 10 in (21.29 m)
- Width: 10 ft 8 in (3.25 m)
- Height: 15 ft 5 in (4.70 m)
- Loco weight: 287,000 lb (130,000 kg)
- Fuel capacity: 2,250 US gal (1,870 imp gal; 8,500 L)
- Prime mover: EMD 16-710G3B-T1
- Engine type: V16, two-stroke diesel
- Alternator: TA-17
- Head end power: 800 kW (1,100 hp)
- Cylinders: 16
Performance figures
- Maximum speed: 100 mph (160 km/h)
- Power output: At alternator: 4,200 hp (3.1 MW); At rail: 3,620 hp (2.70 MW) MAX with HEP on
- Tractive effort: starting: 69,975 lbf (311.26 kN) continuous: 27,000 lbf (120 kN)
Career
- Operators: NJ Transit
- Numbers: 4000–4032
- Sources: except where noted

The Alstom PL42AC is a class of four axle B-B diesel-electric locomotive designed by Alstom in association with GM-EMD. 33 were built between 2003 and 2006 for NJ Transit Rail Operations.

== Description ==
The PL42AC is a diesel-electric 4-axle locomotive built by Alstom with the 16-710G3B prime mover for New Jersey Transit. The first two locomotives were manufactured at the Meinfesa plant in Valencia, Spain in 2003. The 31 following units were assembled at the Alstom Transport plant in Hornell, New York in 2004, and were produced through early 2006. The power rating of the PL42AC locomotives is 4,200 hp (3.1 MW) total for tractive effort and head-end power. The locomotive has a design similar to the GE Genesis, mainly because both PL42AC and Genesis series locomotives were designed by industrial designer Cesar Vergara.

== Future ==
In July 2020, NJ Transit announced that older locomotives in the PL42AC fleet will be replaced by additional ALP-45A dual mode locomotives, due to the PL42AC's unreliability and inability to be upgraded to meet new Environmental Protection Agency standards. Of the 33 units, 23 are slated for replacement, while the remaining 10 will receive a light overhaul for continued service.
