= MPI HSP46 =

Model of American diesel-electric locomotive

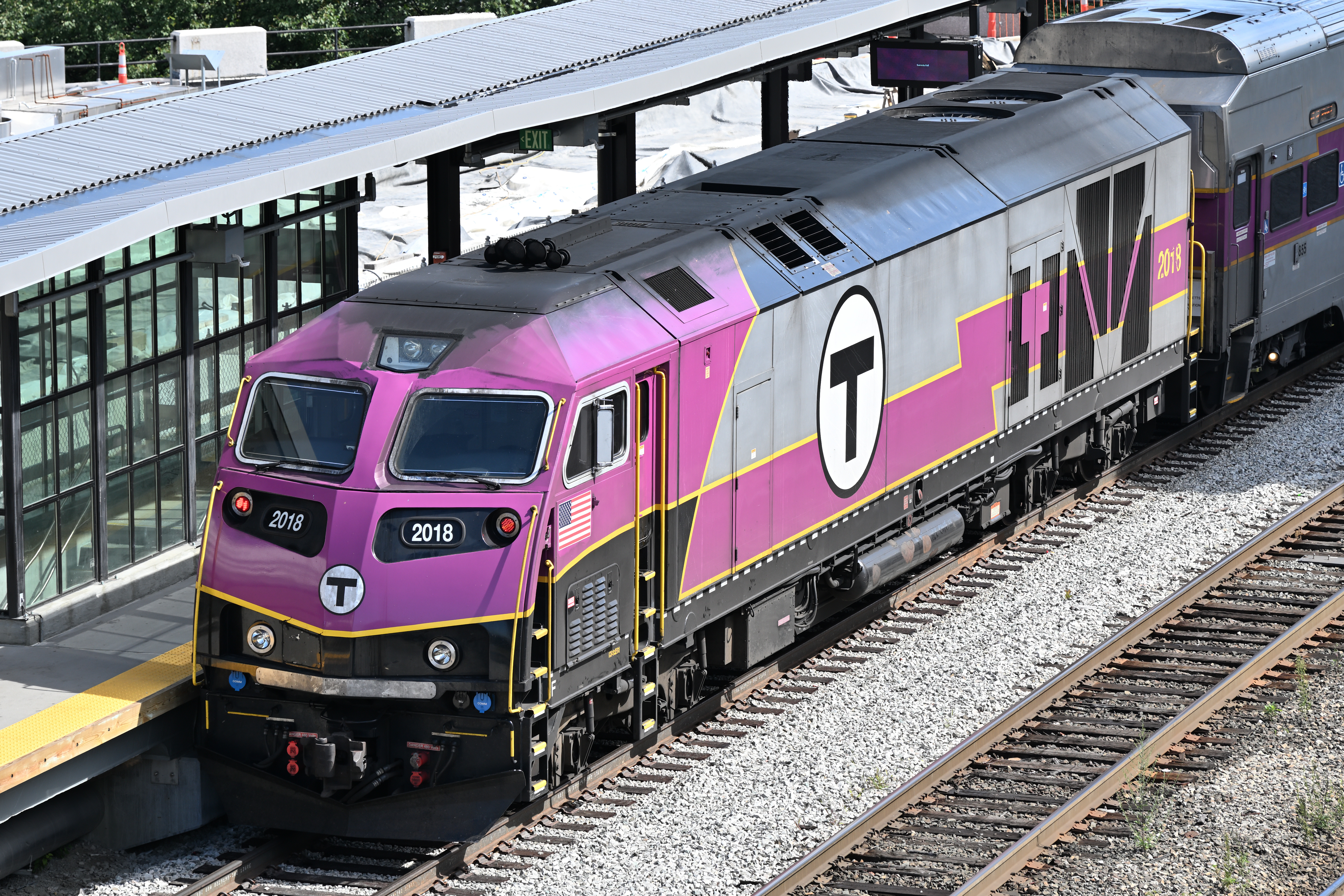
- MBTA locomotive No. 2018 at Worcester
Type and origin
- Power type: Diesel-electric
- Builder: MotivePower
- Model: HSP46
- Build date: 2013–2014
- Total produced: 40
Specifications
- Configuration
  - AAR: B-B
  - UIC: Bo′Bo′
- Gauge: 4 ft 8 1/2 in (1,435 mm)
- Trucks: MPI MP1114, 4-wheel, cast frame w/ traction pivot
- Wheel diameter: 40 in
- Minimum curve: 20 degrees (288 ft 0 in (87.78 m)
- Wheelbase: 45 ft 0 in (13.72 m) (between truck centers)
- Length: 71 ft 0 in (21.64 m)
- Width: 10 ft 0 in (3.05 m)
- Height: 15 ft 4.5 in (4.686 m)
- Axle load: 72,500 lb (32,885 kg) Max
- Adhesive weight: 100%
- Loco weight: 287,500 lb (130,408 kilograms)
- Fuel type: Diesel
- Fuel capacity: 2,000 US gal (7,600 L; 1,700 imp gal)
- Coolant cap.: 360 US gal (1,400 L; 300 imp gal)
- Prime mover: GE GEVO-12
- RPM range: 440–1050 (600–1050 while supplying HEP)
- Engine type: 45° V12, four stroke cycle diesel engine
- Aspiration: Turbocharged
- Displacement: 188.5 L (49.8 US gal; 41.5 imp gal)
- Alternator: GE 5GMG211 Traction Alternator with Integral HEP winding, Single bearing
- Traction motors: 4 GE GEB-15 AC Traction Motors
- Cylinders: 12
- Cylinder size: 15.7083 liters (958.58 cu in)
- Transmission: AC–DC–AC
- MU working: Yes
- Train heating: Locomotive-supplied head-end power; Inverter HEP; IGBT based w/ capacitor/inductor filtration 804 hp (600 kW), 3 phase ,480 VAC
- Loco brake: Electropneumatic w/ blended dynamic braking
- Train brakes: Electropneumatic
- Safety systems: ATC / ACSES / PTC
Performance figures
- Maximum speed: 110 mph (177 km/h) (design); 80 mph (129 km/h) (service)
- Power output: At alternator: 4,650 hp (3,470 kW); At wheel (HEP dependent): ~4,300 hp (3,200 kW) to ~3,500 hp (2,600 kW)
- Tractive effort: 289.14 kN (65,000 lb_{f}) starting
- Factor of adh.: 4.423
Career
- Operators: Massachusetts Bay Transportation Authority
- Numbers: 2000–2039
- Locale: Boston
- Delivered: October 24, 2013
- First run: April 16, 2014

The MPI HSP46 is a four-axle AC-traction diesel-electric locomotive for commuter trains, designed and assembled by MotivePower. It meets EPA Tier 3 emissions standards. The launch customer is the Massachusetts Bay Transportation Authority (MBTA), whose first unit entered revenue service in April 2014.

== Design ==
The locomotives are powered by GE GEVO-12 diesel engines from GE Transportation, equipped with a static inverter for head end power, and capable of meeting the stringent new Tier 3 emissions regulations. AC traction systems, prime movers, head end power equipment, and computer systems are supplied by GE, while MPI supplies the brake systems, air systems, and cooling systems.

The locomotive was styled by industrial designer Cesar Vergara, who also designed the GE Genesis.

== History ==
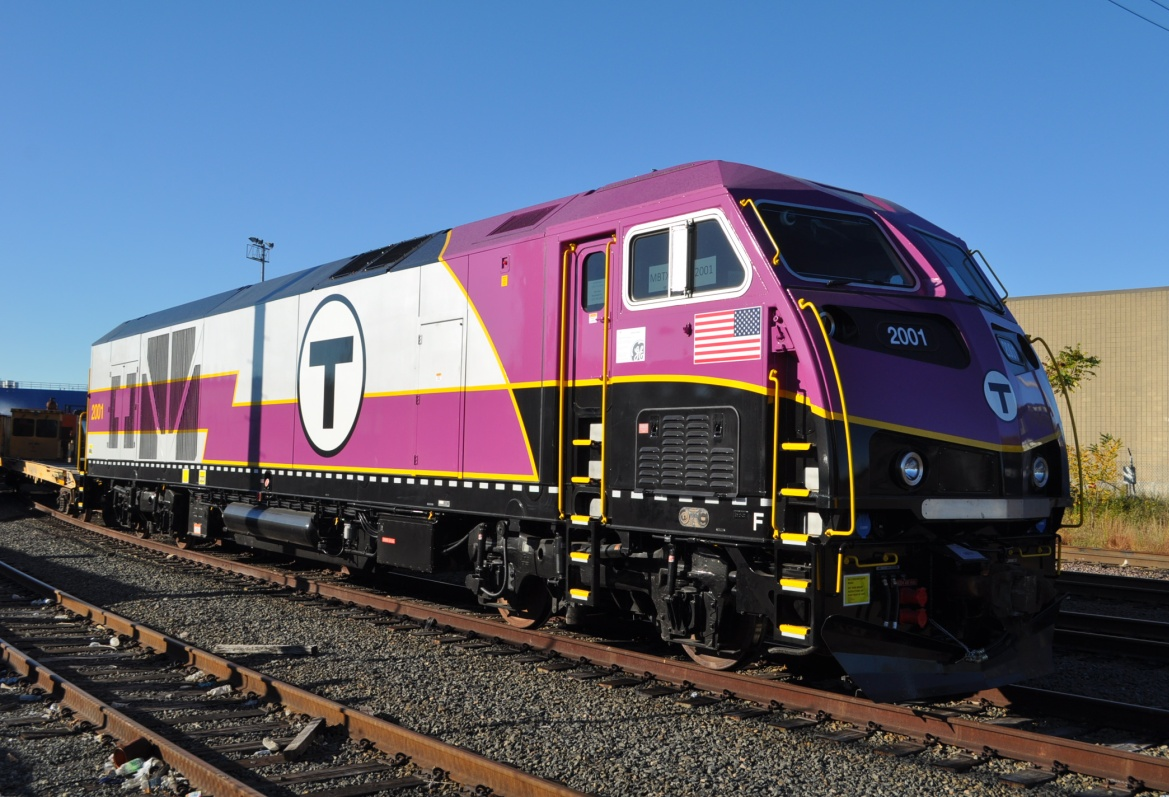
Locomotive No. 2001 at the Commuter Rail Maintenance Facility in October 2013

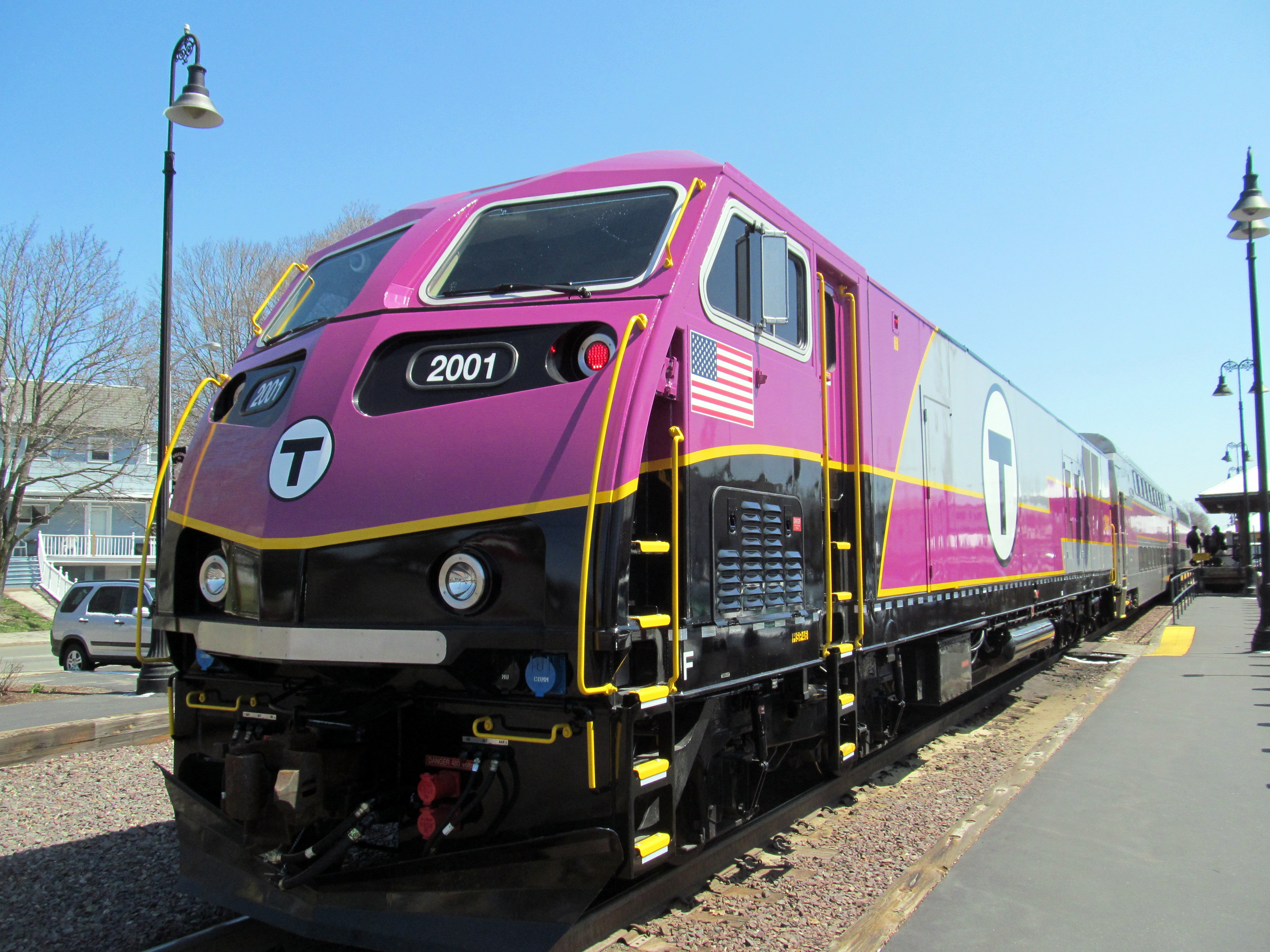
Locomotive No. 2001 on its first day of revenue service in 2014

In the mid-2000s the MBTA issued a request for proposal for new diesel locomotives to replace its aging fleet, much of which dated to the late 1970s. Two firms responded: Vossloh España and MotivePower. MBTA selected Vossloh, but the Federal Transit Administration rejected the MBTA's request for a "Buy America Act" waiver because the MBTA "has not identified a significant technological difference between locomotives produced by Vossloh and MotivePower", and that it has "not established sufficient grounds for a public interest waiver". MBTA turned to MotivePower, and ordered 20 new HSP46 locomotives on July 14, 2010, at a cost of $114.6 million.

On July 27, 2011, the MBTA released images of a new paint scheme for the authority's HSP46 fleet. It was chosen by the general public in an online survey.

On July 11, 2012, the MBTA Board voted to approve the first option for seven locomotives, bringing the order total to 27 units. On April 10, 2013, the Board approved the purchase of the remaining 13 option locomotives, bringing the current order total to 40 units (2000–2039), at a total cost of $240 million.

On October 24, 2013, the first pilot unit, No. 2001, was delivered to the MBTA Commuter Rail Maintenance Facility to begin testing and training. Two other pilot units were also released from MotivePower: No. 2000 to GE's Test Facility in Erie, Pennsylvania, and No. 2003 to the Transportation Technology Center test facility in Pueblo, Colorado. Only No. 2001 was given the MBTA paint scheme; the other two test units were unpainted.

On April 16, 2014, No. 2001 entered revenue service, with its first round trip taking place on the Haverhill Line. As of October 2015, 36 of the 40 locomotives are in service. En route to the MBTA, the locomotives were sent to the Providence & Worcester Railroad, which is subcontracted to MPI to prepare the units for revenue service.

In August 2014, MPI discovered that some traction motor bearings had been shipped improperly to their factory, causing early failures. Locomotives already delivered to the MBTA were repaired on-site, while half of the locomotives were redirected to Altoona Works during delivery for replacement bearings to be installed. The issues were not disclosed to the press until January 2015. While the repairs were performed under warranty at no cost to the MBTA, they constituted an additional delay that prevented some of the units from entering service before the end of 2015. The multiple delays and early mechanical issues have raised concern from industry commentators about the MBTA's procurement process and the overall quality of the locomotives.

Despite multiple repairs and modifications, the HSP46s have continued to experience mechanical problems. Turbochargers failed in several locomotives beginning in Fall 2016, and will have to be replaced fleet-wide. Fleet availability fell to 27 of 40 in early April 2017. In December 2025, the MBTA issued a $223 million contract with Wabtec to overhaul the 40 locomotives. They are expected to be completed from February 2029 to March 2032.
