= Cesar Vergara =

Mexican-American industrial designer

- Born: Cesar Vergara; Mexico
- Occupation: Industrial design
- Known for: Passenger locomotive design

Cesar Vergara is a Mexican-born American industrial designer, specializing in rail transport. He has designed a number of passenger train locomotives and cars, including the GE Genesis, the Talgo trainsets used on Amtrak Cascades, and the MTA M8 railcar, and participated in the prototype development of the French high-speed AGV. He also designed the paint scheme for the DC Circulator and the taxis in Washington, D.C. Vergara has been recognized for his designs with a number of industry awards.

== Early life ==
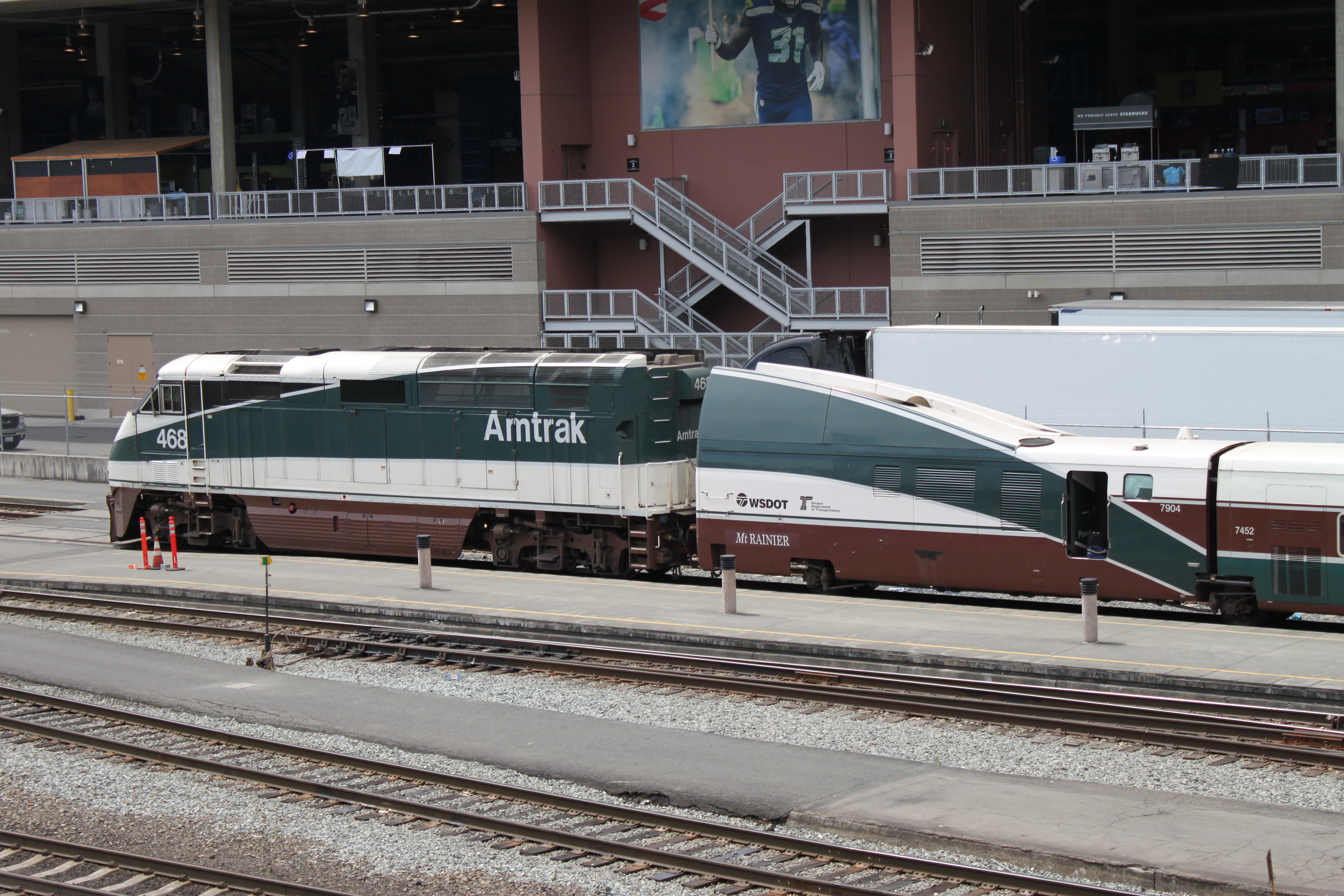
The Amtrak Cascades trainsets include design from Vergara; he added the "fins" between the locomotive and first car, and created the unique paint scheme.

Cesar Vergara was born in Mexico, to an architect father. Vergara's father was involved in designing stations for Mexico City's subway, and engaged his son in his work; Vergara's mother also supported his artistic inclinations. The Vergara family moved to Washington, D.C., and Cesar subsequently enrolled in a design school in Sweden at Konstfack - University of Arts, Crafts and Design in Stockholm. In Sweden, he developed an appreciation for the role of trains in public transit, but "also thought most were awful looking".

== Career ==
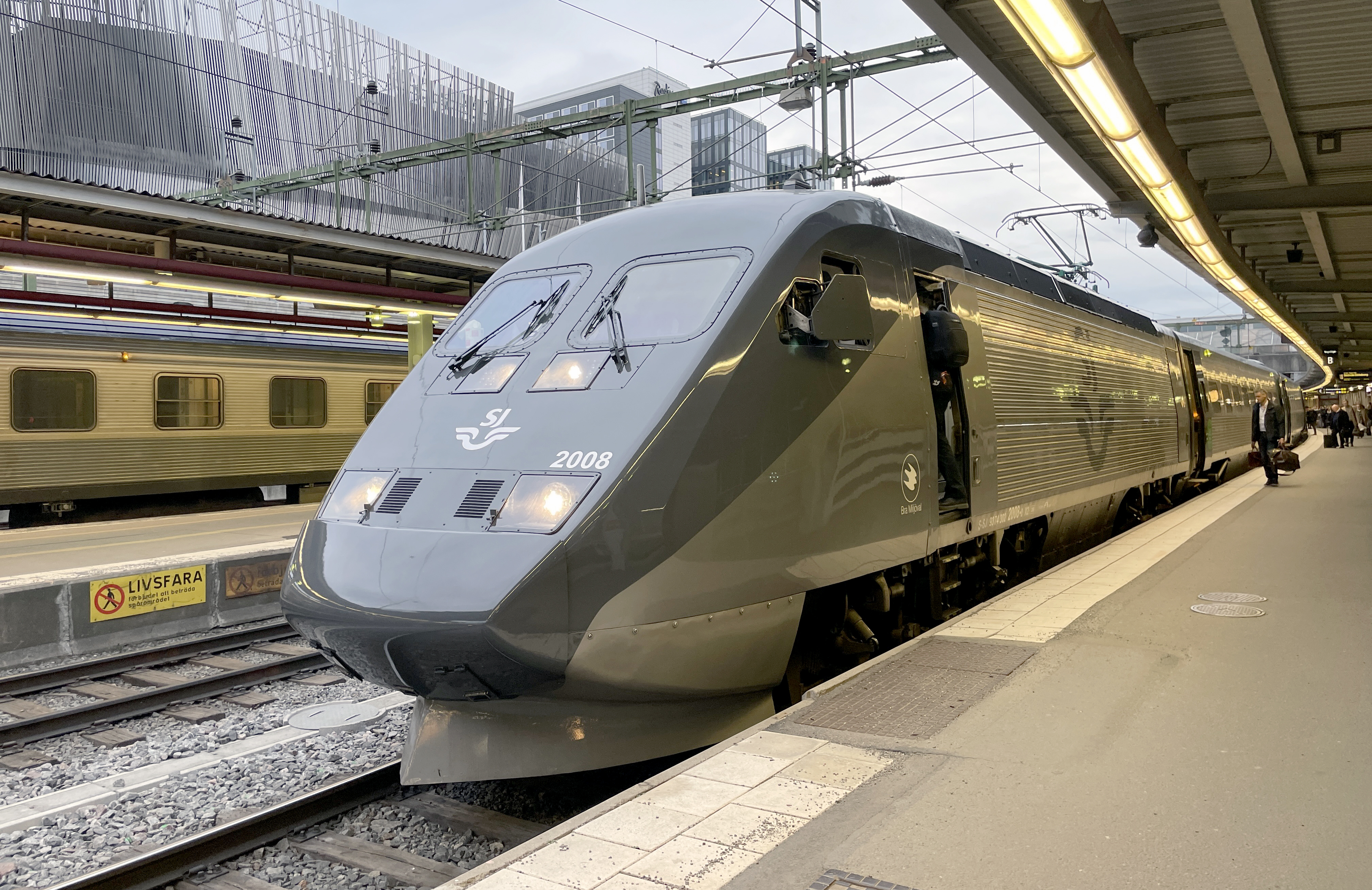
The Swedish X 2000 was the first train Vergara was involved in designing

While in Sweden, Vergara had his first opportunity to contribute to train design, as a firm he worked for was involved in designing the X 2000 high speed train.

Cesar Vergara joined Amtrak in 1990 as Director of Vehicle Design and Manager of Car Design, a position he held until 1999. Soon after his hiring, Amtrak president W. Graham Claytor Jr. asked Vergara to lead design efforts for a replacement of the company's EMD F40PH locomotives. In collaboration with GE Transportation, Vergara and the team he supervised came up with the GE Genesis. Unlike their predecessors, the Genesis locomotives incorporated a monocoque (one-piece) design conceived by Vergara, which made them lighter, more efficient, and more aerodynamic, despite being 14 inches (36 cm) shorter and producing an additional 1,200 horsepower (890 kW). His design was a nod to the EMD E-units which once pulled many passenger trains.

In 1999, Vergara left Amtrak to join Teague, a Seattle-based design consultancy. He subsequently joined NJ Transit in 2001 as the agency's first ever chief designer. NJ Transit's then executive director said of his hiring "The first time we met, I suggested Cesar join us instead of just consulting. He couldn't believe I would turn the empire over to him and I couldn't believe a world-class designer would join us". During his time with the agency, Vergara introduced a new paint scheme for rolling stock, along with redesigning stations. Past NJ Transit projects had faced opposition for being "ugly", and Vergara's new designs helped overcome objections.

Vergara returned to private industry in 2003, before forming his own company, Vergarastudio, in 2009, based in Ridgefield, Connecticut, where he lives.

Vergara has described his design philosophy as based on the belief that "we don't need any more ugly things in this world and it costs as much to build an ugly train as an attractive one".

== Gallery ==
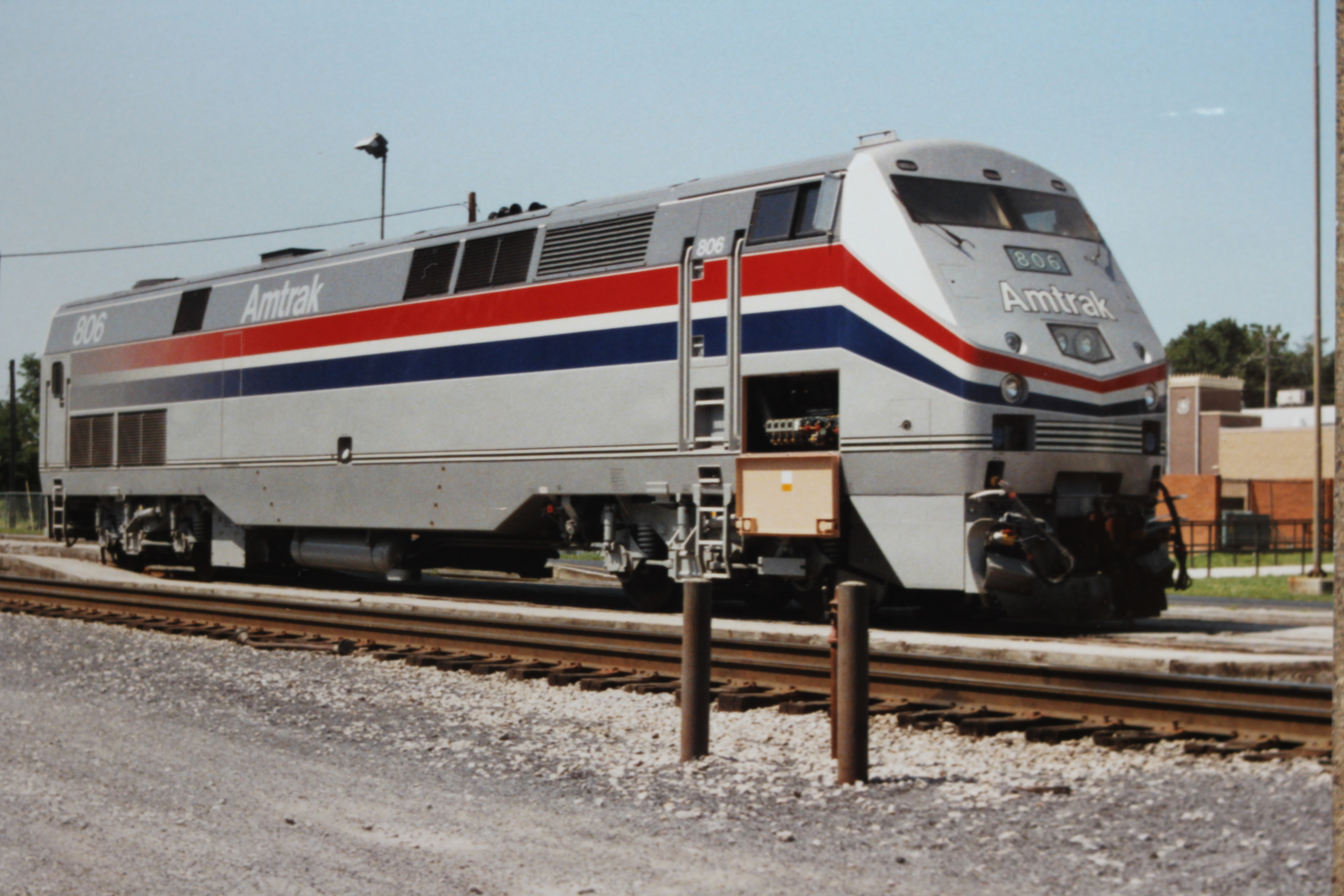
GE Genesis locomotive

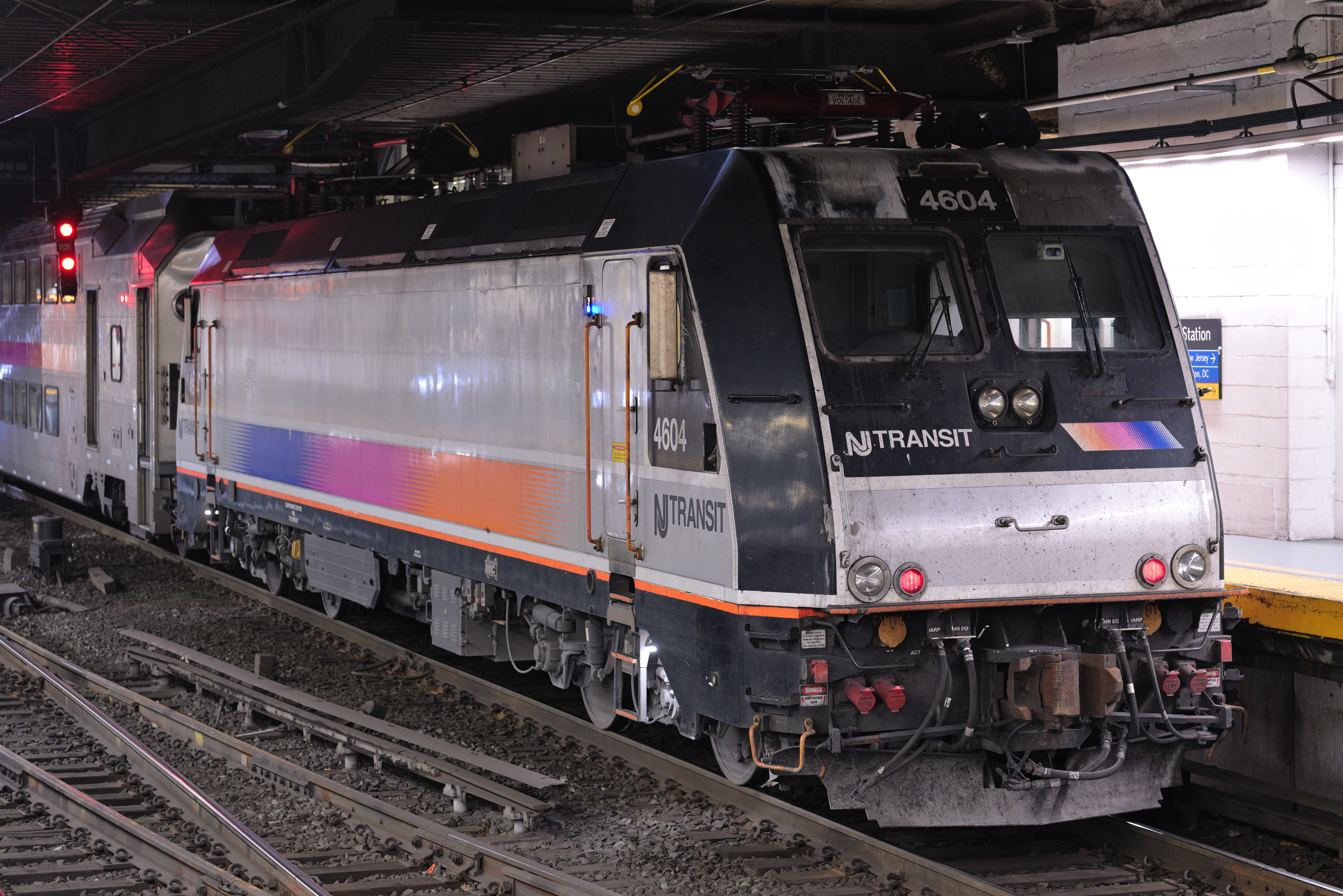
Bombardier ALP-46 locomotive

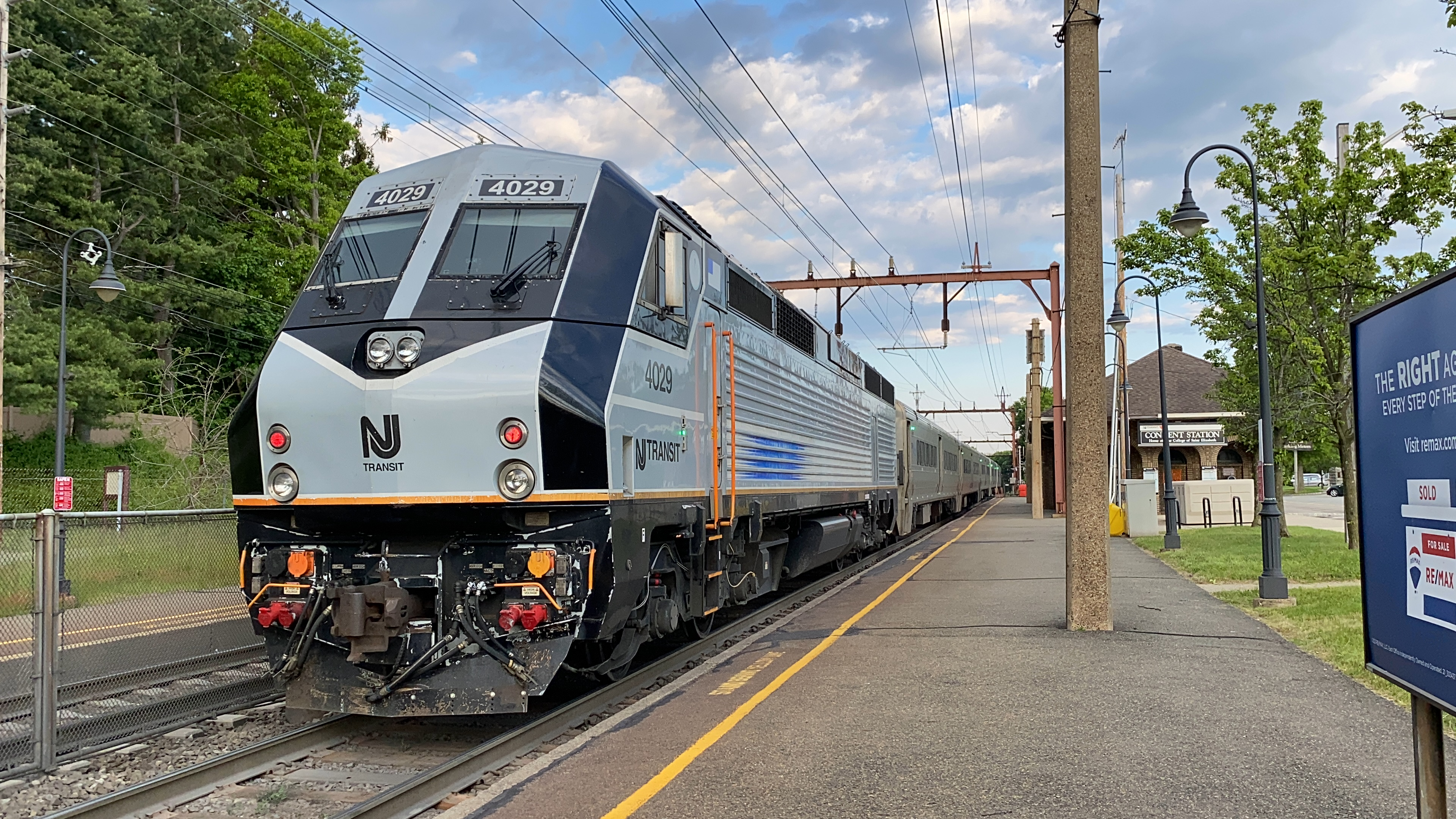
Alstom PL42AC locomotive

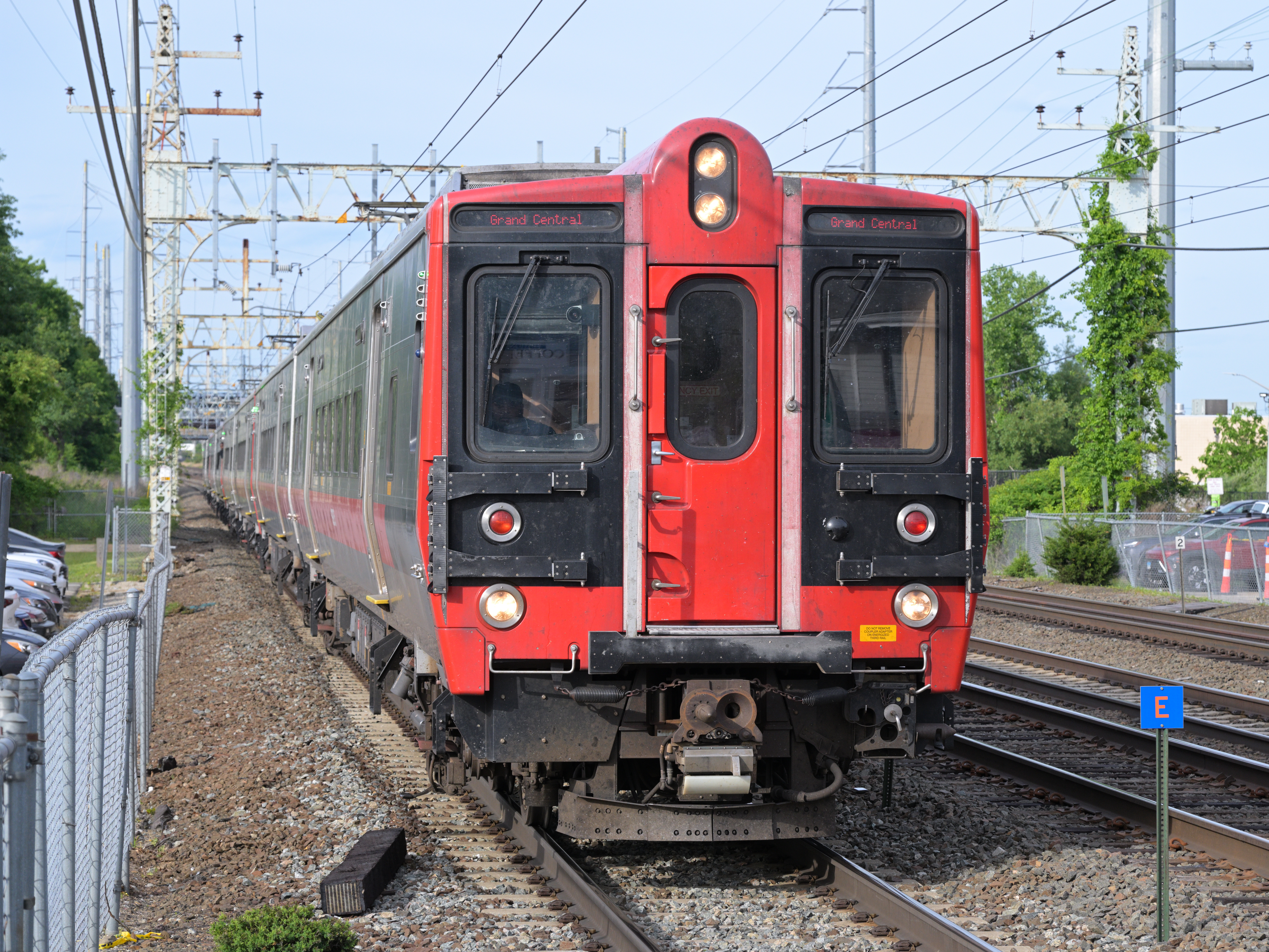
Kawasaki M8 electric multiple-unit

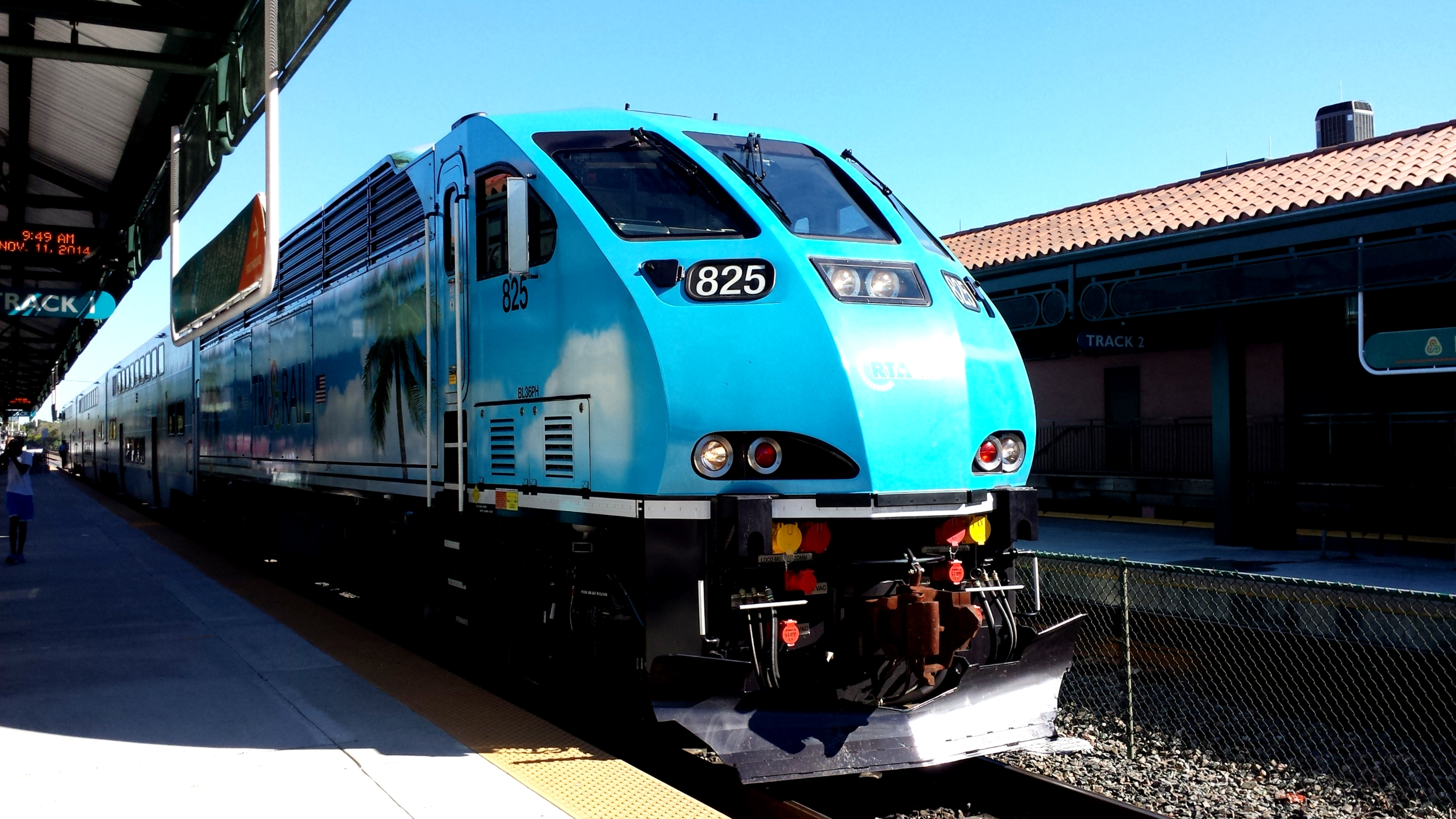
Brookville BL36PH locomotive

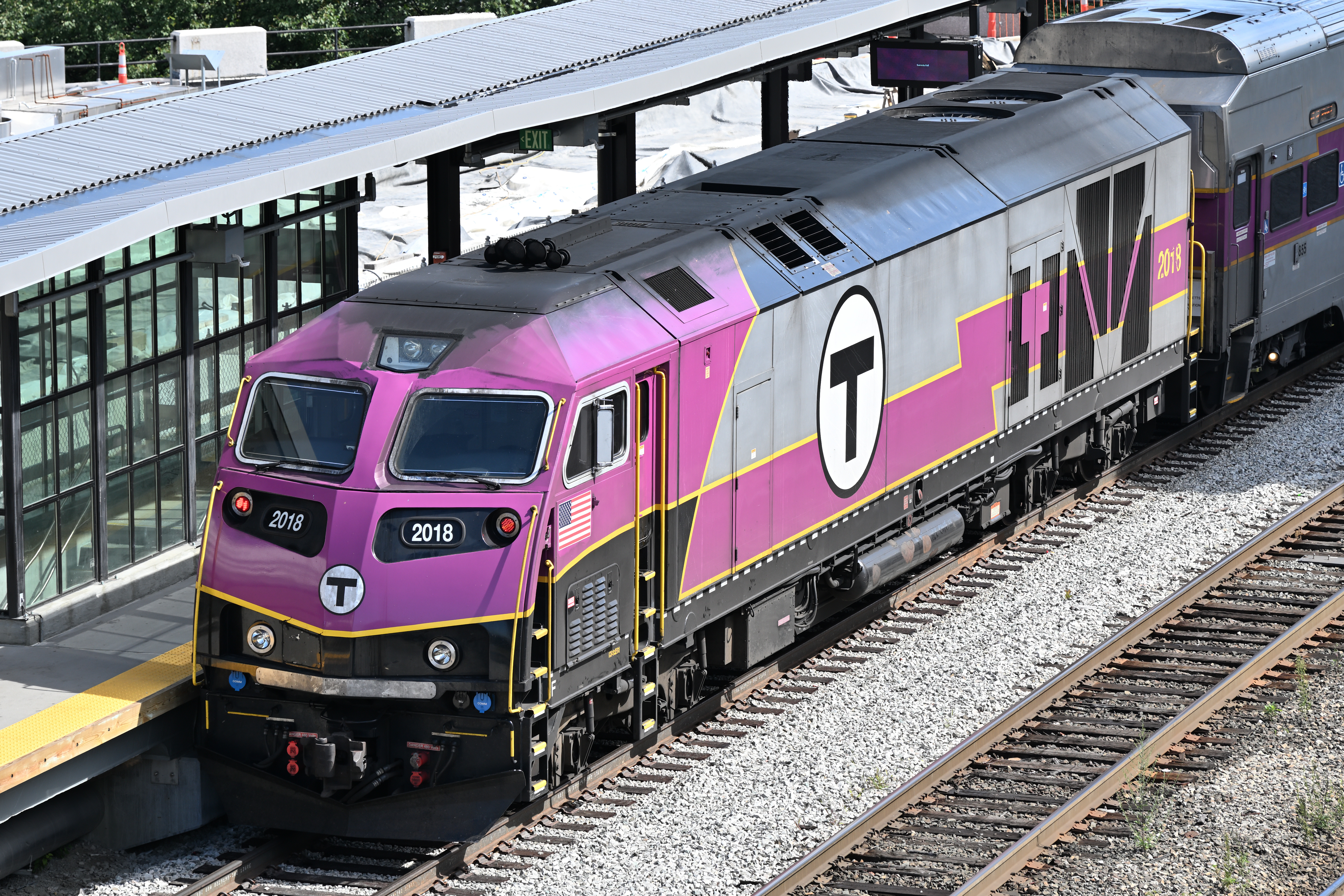
MPI HSP46 locomotive
