= Osgood Bradley Car Company =

American railway and streetcar rolling stock manufacturer

Coordinates: 42°19′18.04″N 71°47′51.47″W

- Company type: Subsidiary
- Industry: Rail transport
- Founded: 1822; 204 years ago
- Successor: Pullman Company
- Headquarters: Worcester, Massachusetts, USA.
- Area served: Worldwide
- Products: Locomotives; High-speed trains Intercity and commuter trains Trams; People movers Signalling systems

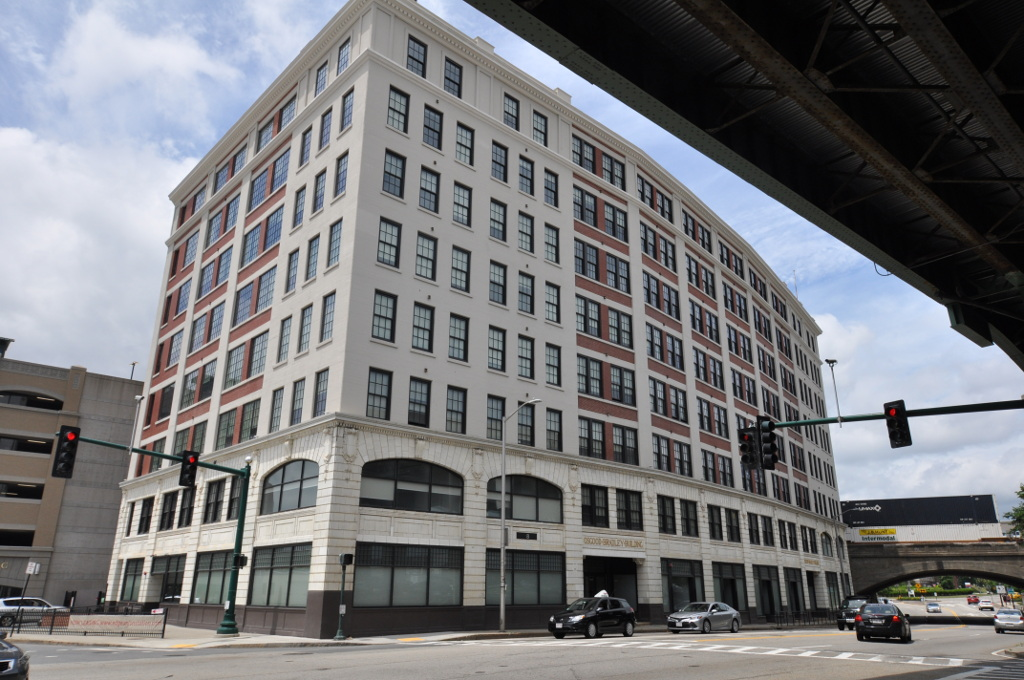
Osgood Bradley Building in Worcester, Massachusetts.

The Osgood Bradley Car Company manufactured railway passenger cars and streetcars in Worcester, Massachusetts.

== History ==
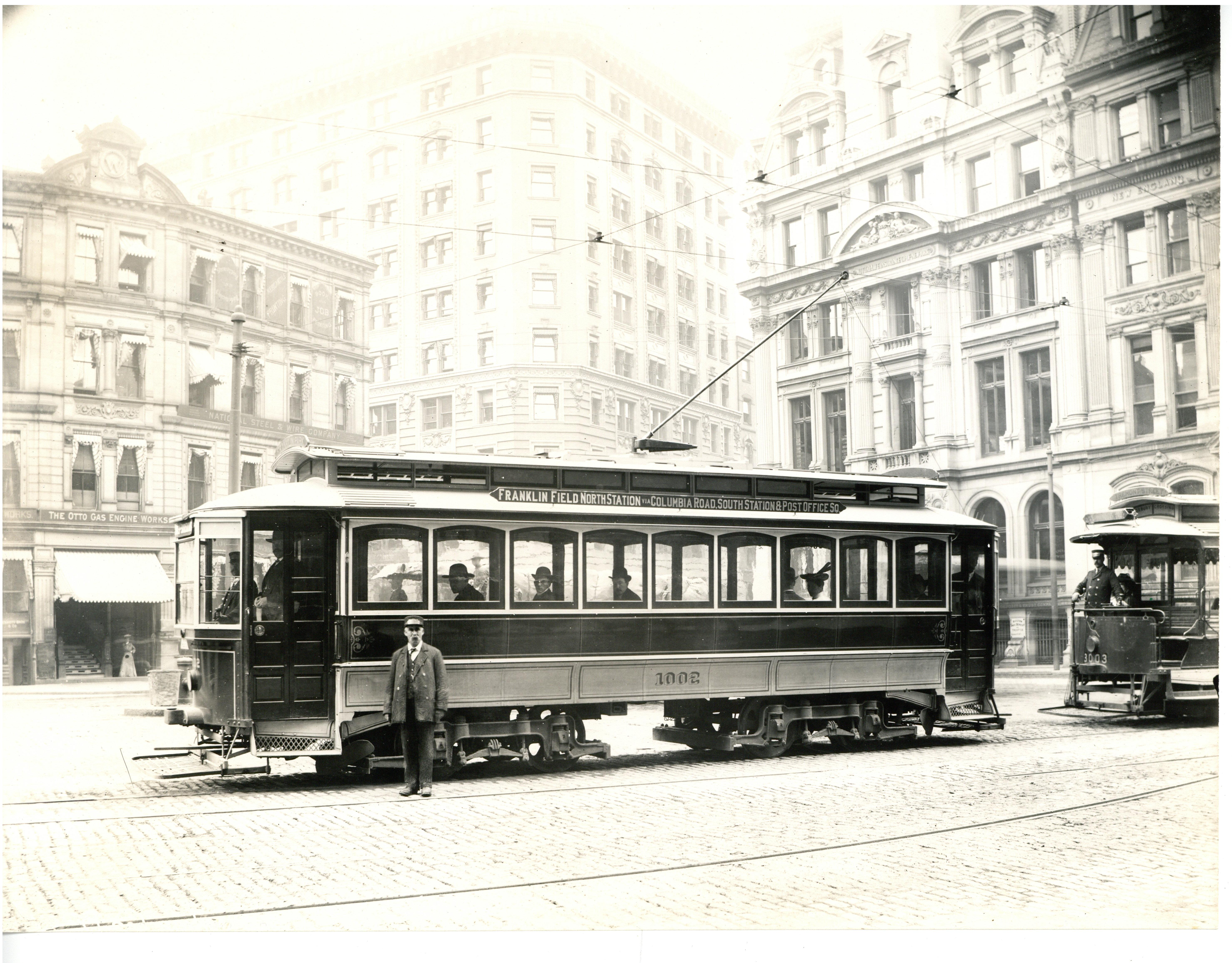
Boston streetcar built by Osgood Bradley.

The company was founded in 1822 to manufacture stagecoaches and sleighs. The company's first railway passenger cars were built for the Boston and Worcester Railroad in 1835. During the American Civil War, the company produced gun carriages for the Union Army. Osgood Bradley was purchased by the Pullman Company in 1930.

== American Flyer cars ==
The Worcester factory is popularly remembered as the manufacturer of the American Flyer streamlined passenger car during the 1930s. Walter Dorwin Teague designed a rounded aircraft-style body for railway cars manufactured of Cor-Ten steel. These cars weighed 15 tons less than conventional heavyweight steel cars. It was hoped these attractive lightweight cars might encourage public use of rail transportation while offering improved economy to the railway companies. New York, New Haven and Hartford Railroad purchased the first of these cars in 1934. Other purchasers included Boston and Maine Railroad, Bangor and Aroostook Railroad, Kansas City Southern Railway, Seaboard Air Line Railroad, St. Louis Southwestern Railway, and Lehigh Valley Railroad. A. C. Gilbert Company, with New Haven trains running past their factory, decided to produce models of this car for their American Flyer toy train sets. Thousands of these toys were produced from 1946 to 1958; and railfans used the name American Flyer to describe the streamlined cars made by Osgood Bradley.

== Archives and records ==
- Osgood Bradley Car Company records at Baker Library Special Collections, Harvard Business School.
- Osgood Bradley Car Company Drawings, Drawing Lists, Lot Lists & Photos at Pullman Library, Illinois Railway Museum
