= Osgood Bradley Building =

- U.S. National Register of Historic Places
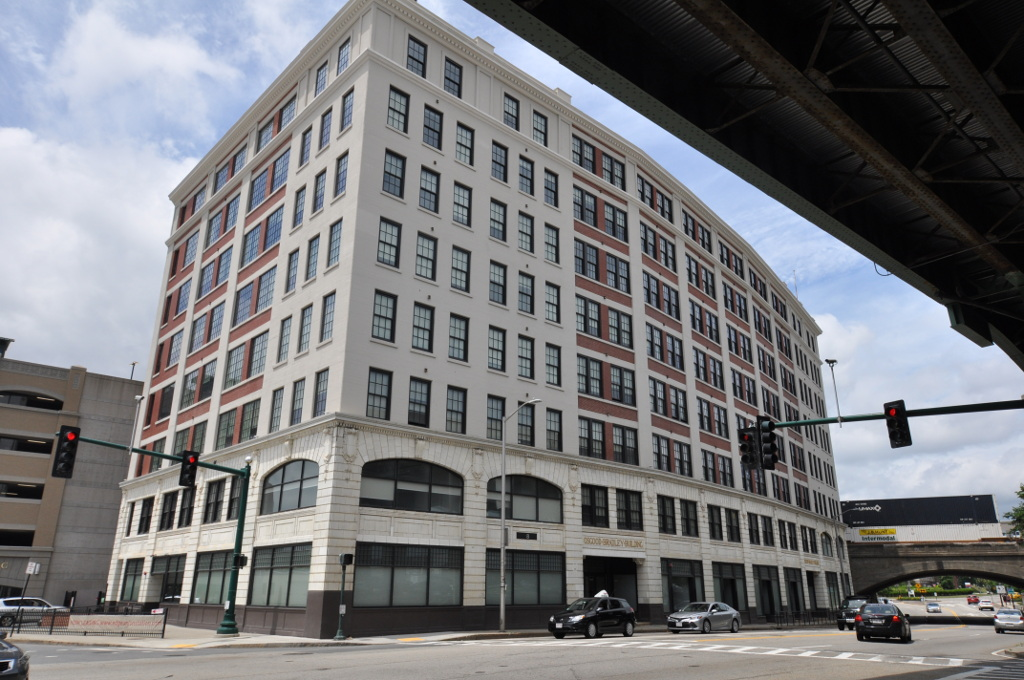

- Location within Massachusetts Location within the United States
- Location: 18 Grafton St., Worcester, Massachusetts
- Coordinates: 42°15′38″N 71°47′38″W
- Built: 1916
- Architect: William S. Timmins
- NRHP reference No.: 100002161
- Added to NRHP: March 05, 2018

The Osgood Bradley Building is an historic industrial building at 18 Grafton Street in Worcester, Massachusetts. Completed in 1916, the eight-story brick building is notable for its association with the Osgood Bradley Car Company, an early manufacturer of both railroad cars and automobiles. The building was listed on the National Register of Historic Places in 2018.

== Description and history ==
The Osgood Bradley Building is located east of downtown Worcester, set close to Interstate 290 on the west side of Grafton Street at Franklin Street. It is an eight-story masonry structure, built with a concrete frame, and an exterior finished in concrete, brick, terra cotta, and marble. The main facade is ten bays wide, with two building entrances, four retail spaces between them, and two outer bays with windows only. The lower two floors are set off from the upper floors by a dentillated cornice, with medallions at the tops of the piers between the bays. The outer two bays have segmented-arch openings on the second floor, while the inner bays have bays with two pairs of sash windows separated by piers. Central piers on the upper floors are finished in red brick, in contrast to the pale concrete and terra cotta of most of the facade.

The Osgood Bradley Company was founded in 1820, and originally manufactured stage coaches, carriages, and wagons. In the 1830s, it branched out into the manufacture of railroad cars, one of the earliest manufacturers to do so. In 1835, it developed the Grafton Street property with a factory for rail car manufacture. The facility produced them until 1909, except during the American Civil War, when production was converted to gun carriages and forges. Following the relocation of its rail car business, the company tore down the factory and built this industrial facility as a speculative venture to lease to other manufacturers. It retained William Timmis, an industrial architect from New York City to design the building. During World War II, businesses occupying the building manufactured proximity fuses for use in munitions.

The Osgood Bradley Building housed many manufactures, most notably, Worcester Gear Works, run by Ed Matusik, and New England Diamond (N-E-D), founded by Peter Wyatt. Both combined forces to buy the Osgood Bradley Building in 1974. In 2010, Peter Wyatt's son, Brad Wyatt bought out Ed Matusik's share of the building, and in 2015, sold the historic property to a developer to convert to student housing.

== See also ==
- National Register of Historic Places listings in northwestern Worcester, Massachusetts
- National Register of Historic Places listings in Worcester County, Massachusetts
