= Teague (company) =

Design consultancy company

- Type: Private
- Founded: 1926, New York, NY
- Headquarters: Seattle, Washington, United States
- Services: Mechanical; Electrical; Software Engineering; Industrial Design; Interaction Design; Prototyping
- Number of employees: 300 (2018)
- Website: teague.com

Teague is a global design consultancy headquartered in Seattle, Washington. Established in 1926 by Walter Dorwin Teague, Teague is known for its design contributions through the disciplines of product design, interaction design, environmental design, and mechanical design. The company is privately held and is particularly recognized for its work in aviation and consumer goods, done for clients such as The Boeing Company, Microsoft, Hewlett-Packard, Samsung and Panasonic.

Teague's early role in consumer culture is most popularly associated with designs such as the first Polaroid camera, the UPS truck, Texaco service stations, and the Pringles Chips canister. The Xbox and the Boeing 787 Dreamliner headline Teague's post-2000 design work.

== History ==
In the mid-1920s, Walter Dorwin Teague, an illustrator and typographer, was one of a group of individuals interested in pioneering the design of products for manufacturers as a distinct occupation. He departed from an advertising career at New York-based Calkins & Holden to establish Teague as a sole-proprietorship in 1926. Teague's value proposition was to improve the appearance, function and sales of clients' products, thereby strengthening businesses' brand image while translating the era's cultural context through tangible objects.

=== Early Expansion ===
Although product design culture was still limited to the wealthy throughout the 1930s, Teague pursued strategic relationships with businesses offering products to benefit the masses, citing a loss of concern for appearance in manufacturing when the Industrial Revolution replaced craftsmanship with machinery. In 1927, Teague was commissioned by Eastman Kodak to design cameras, and by the following year had co-located with Kodak in Upstate New York. During what would become a thirty-year relationship, Teague designed some of Kodak's products, including the Baby Brownie, Super Six-20, Kodak Medalist, and the Kodak Bantam Special, one of the most popular cameras ever produced. The Baby Brownie had outsold any other camera ever made.

Teague expanded its portfolio in the early 1930s with: the Marmon 16, the first production automobile conceived by an industrial designer; 32 design patterns for Steuben Glass, a division of Corning Glass Works; and the design of passenger cars and diners for the New York, New Haven and Hartford Railroads. By 1938, Teague's office grew to 55 employees, including architects, engineers, 3D artists and industrial designers. Teague had also signed its first highly lucrative design retainer contract with Polaroid, culminating in the later development of the Land Camera, the first camera able to develop its own prints, introduced in 1948.

=== Environmental Design and Corporate Identity ===
Teague's product designs for Kodak evolved into the design of Kodak's offices, retail stores, and exhibitions at the New York World's Fair. The concept of "corporate identity" emerged from this cross-disciplined work of commercial design and the applied arts and science of creating the human-designed environment. Initiating the first corporate identity program of its kind, Teague created a full branding image for Texaco, including the design of full station layouts for Texaco service stations, pumps, trucks, cans and signs. Considered Art Deco icons of their era, more than 20,000 of these Texaco stations had been built worldwide by 1960.

Designed for the 1939 New York World's Fair, the National Cash Register Building functioned not only as an exhibit center, but as the world's largest active cash register. The design showcases NCR's new 100 Model through the seven-story register atop the building.

=== World Fairs ===
In the 1930s and 1940s, Teague parlayed the new concept of corporate identity into designing corporate industrial exhibits for companies such as Con Edison, Du Pont, Kodak, US Steel, and the National Cash Register Company. In 1933, Teague designed numerous displays for the Ford Motor Company at the Chicago Century of Progress Exposition, and expanded its showcase of architectural savvy through the design of the Texaco exhibition hall at the 1935 Texas Centennial Exposition in Dallas, Texas, as well as the Ford pavilion for the California Pacific International Exposition in San Diego, California (now housing the San Diego Aerospace Museum). Having designed multiple exhibitions at the New York World's Fair, including the Kodak Hall of Lights and the National Cash Register Building, Walter Dorwin Teague was invited to serve on its Board of Design, as well as design the Ford Exposition Building at New York's World Fair of 1939. Teague would also later design the U.S. Science Center for the World's Fair in Seattle, as well as the "House of the Future" for the Festival of Gas at the 1964 World's Fair.

=== Structure and Scope ===
By the 1940s, product design culture had only just begun to come of age through consideration of a product's functional, technological, cultural and economic factors. In 1945, a year after establishing an engineering division, Teague's corporate structure changed from a sole proprietorship to a partnership, allowing senior staff to be partners in the company. Profit-sharing increased employee retention and pride in ownership in the company encouraged project-successes.

Diversifying the firm's portfolio, Teague's projects included packaging for Ac'cent, a product for the International Minerals and Chemical Corporation, equipment design for the Navy Bureau of Ordinance of the U.S. Navy, design of the UPS delivery truck and the visual styling of Steinway Pianos, the first of which is on display at the Smithsonian museum (as of 2012).

The 1940s also commenced Teague's collaborative relationship with The Boeing Company, which began in 1946 and continues to date, as of January 2012. (See Aviation.)

=== Post-War Decades: Product Packaging and Interior Design ===
Products of mass-consumption and the expansion of pop culture in the 1950s strengthened the influence of industrial design in both public consciousness and big business. By the late 1950s, Teague expanded its work in product packaging design, creating a new corporate identity for Schaefer Beer. This early work would later lead to projects with Ivory soap, Downy, Comet cleanser, Cheetos, Scope mouthwash, Head & Shoulders, and Chiffon margarine. With offices in New York and Seattle, and design labs in several domestic and overseas locations, Teague strengthened its application of package design through the consumer revolution of the 1960s, forming lasting relationships with both Procter & Gamble and the General Foods Corporation.

The Oil Crisis and anger toward American imperialism waned the mass-impact of industrial design for nearly two decades. During the early 1970s, the majority of Teague's work was in architectural and interior design. In addition to banks, showrooms, museums, corporate headquarters, supermarkets and government facilities, Teague's largest space of interior design was for Skidmore, Owings & Merrill's Air Force Academy in Colorado, where design work covered 3.5 million square feet of space, including dining halls, dormitory rooms, classrooms, and more than 60,000 objects. By 1977, Walter Dorwin Teague Associates was larger than any of its competitors, employing roughly 150 designers, architects and technicians.

As the Information Age and its new media culture surfaced, Teague continued its collaborative work with key clients, such as Procter & Gamble and Boeing, and established new client relationships that resulted in numerous package designs now considered classics, including the Lays Potato Chips and Frito Corn Chips bags, the Pringles Potato Chips canister, Ivory soap, and the Scope Mouthwash Bottle. Other notable post-1975 design achievements include the Kenworth Sleeper truck, the first truck designed to house a sleeper cabin, developed in 1976; and the crew quarters for the NASA space station, designed in 1987.

== Aviation ==
Teague's history in aviation began with Boeing in 1946 when Teague designed the aircraft interior for the Boeing Stratocruiser. The inverted figure-8 double deck fuselage provided 6,600 feet of interior space designed specifically for luxury air travel. The Stratocruiser's interior later inspired the interior cabins of both the Boeing 707 and 747 planes.

The 707 aircraft model marked a "new flight era" for passengers, with more windows, a passenger service unit, illuminated seat-belt signs, and 1,300 square feet of interior space. Boeing's 747, the world's first wide-body commercial jetliner, which was two and a half times the size of the 707, was used to create the Reagan-era Air Force One in 1988. The Boeing-Teague team's Air-Force One project received tremendous media attention throughout its development as the aircraft designed to transport the US President and White House staff, and included 100 telephones, two fully equipped kitchens, 16 televisions, seven bathrooms, 31 executive sleeper suites, and other extravagant amenities.

In 1997, the team unveiled the Boeing 737 interior and exterior design at the Paris Air Show. Eight years later they would also premier the 777-200LR Worldliner model there, a model that broke distance records during its "Going the Distance" world tour. In January 2012, Boeing announced that the 777 had also set a new record for orders in a single year (2011) at 200. The Boeing-Teague team also developed the Boeing Skyloft Concept in 2005, a first-of-its-kind architectural transformation to create a new level of commercial space in cabin real estate.

The result of a five-year collaboration between Boeing and Teague, the Boeing 787 Dreamliner set new world records for distance and speed during an endurance flight around the world in 2011, the year of the 787's first delivery. Dubbed "The New Plane for the New World," the 787 is considered the most successful commercial airplane launch in aviation history.

Teague's design work for jetliner interiors includes projects for global airlines, such as Singapore Airlines and Emirates. In 2008, Teague earned the international Red Dot Design award for Emirates First-Class Cabin and Entry-Way, designed in collaboration with Boeing, Emirates, and Paris-based Pierrejean Studios to create a dramatic new cabin interior for the airline's 777-models.

Leading the proliferation of in-flight entertainment and communications, Teague has developed both hardware and software for clients like Rockwell-Collins and Panasonic Avionics, with whom Teague's relationship began in the early 1990s. Weber Aircraft, Panasonic and Teague collaboratively developed the first ever fully integrated in-flight entertainment seat for commercial aircraft, the Panasonic Integrated Smart Monitor.

== New Millennium: Consumer Electronics ==
At the turn of the millennium, Teague's work shifted to focus heavily on consumer electronics.

In 2001, the Seattle-based Microsoft called on Teague to co-design its first gaming console, the Xbox. The project's success culminated in a series of additional collaborative projects between Microsoft and Teague. Expanding its client-base and award-winning portfolio in the consumer electronics market, Teague collaborated with companies such as Samsung, Panasonic, Gateway, Intel, LG, Hewlett-Packard, and T-Mobile. Some of their widely acclaimed designs include the Samsung Portable Digital Projector, the Gateway One computer, the Xbox 360 Wireless Racing Wheel, and the Microsoft Shell Laptop.

== Corporate ==
In 2004, John Barratt signed on as Teague's President and CEO. As of 2012, Teague employs approximately 300 designers and support staff within the Seattle-based Aviation Studio and Design Studio.

In 2011, Teague acquired a Munich-based design studio to expand into the European market.
