= Walter Dorwin Teague =

American pioneer industrial designer (1883–1960)

- Born: December 18, 1883; Pendleton, Indiana, US
- Died: December 5, 1960 (aged 76); Flemington, New Jersey, US
- Education: Art Students League of New York
- Occupation: Architect
- Spouse(s): Cecelia Fehon (m. 1908, d. 1937); Ruth Mills
- Children: 3
- Projects: New York World's Fair; Kodak products Steinway piano

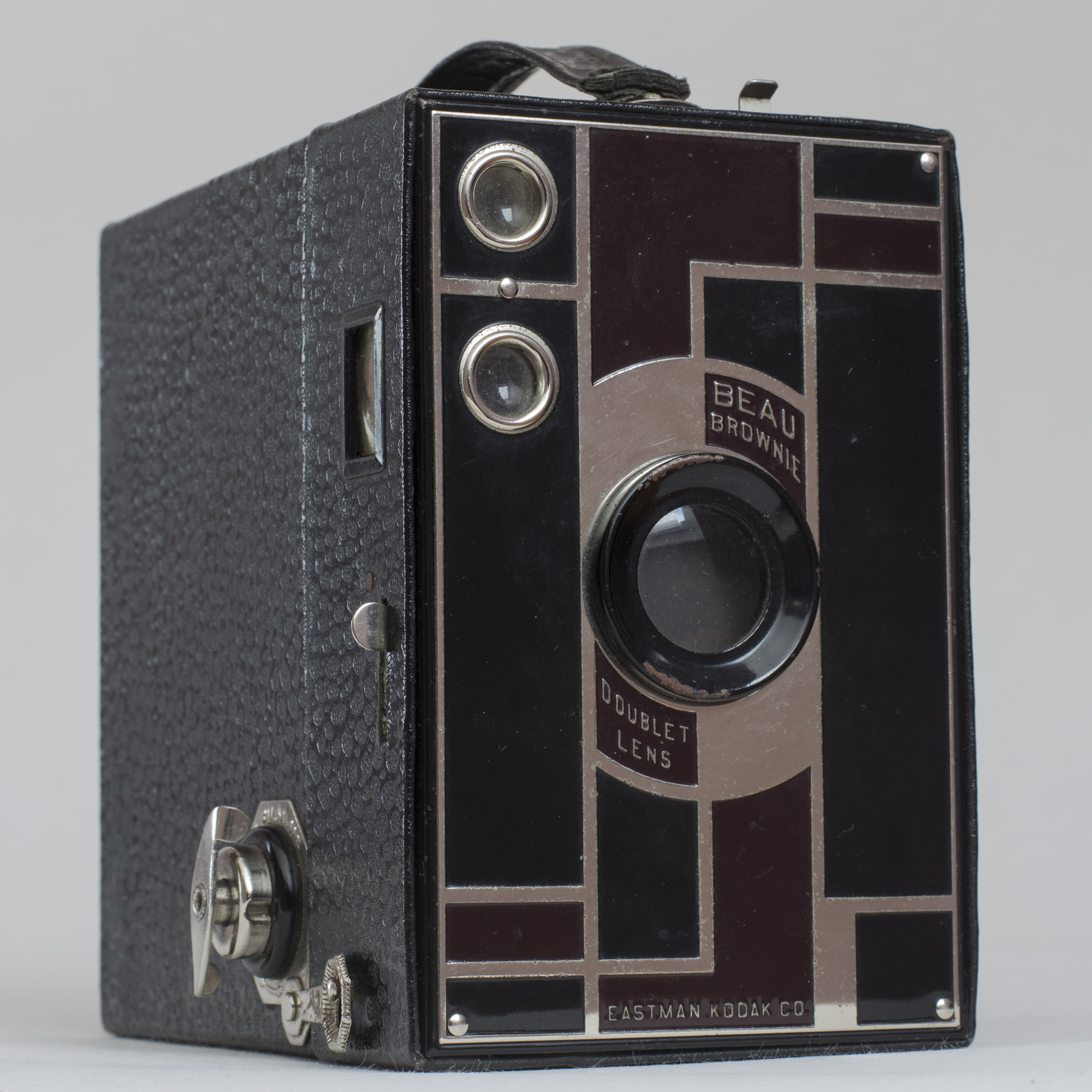
Kodak Beau Brownie by Teague (early 1930s)

Walter Dorwin Teague (December 18, 1883 – December 5, 1960) was an American industrial designer, architect, illustrator, graphic designer, writer, and entrepreneur. Often referred to as the "Dean of Industrial Design", Teague pioneered in the establishment of industrial design as a profession in the United States, along with Norman Bel Geddes, Raymond Loewy, Henry Dreyfuss and Joseph Sinel.

Regarded as a classicist and a traditionalist despite a later shift to modern tastes, Teague is recognized as a critical figure in the spread of mid-century modernism in America. He is widely known for his exhibition designs during the 1939–40 New York World's Fair, such as the Ford Building, and his iconic product and package designs, from Eastman Kodak's Bantam Special to the steel-legged Steinway piano.

A self-described late starter whose professional acclaim began as he approached age 50, Teague sought to create heirlooms out of mass-produced manufactured objects, and frequently cited beauty as "visible rightness". In 1926 Teague assembled an industrial design consultancy later known as Teague.

== Biography ==
Teague was one of six children born to an established Decatur, Indiana family. In 1840, Teague's grandfather had moved from North Carolina to Pendleton, Indiana, home to one of America's largest Quaker communities. Teague's father, of Irish forebears, became a circuit-riding Methodist minister (and later full-time tailor) who settled in Pendleton with his family. With little money, the Teague household was laden with books.

At age 16, while he was still in school in Pendleton, Teague worked as a handyman at the local paper, where he quickly became a jack-of-all-trades and eventually a reporter.

Teague married Cecelia Fehon in 1908. They had three children: Walter Dorwin Jr., Cecily Fehon and Rudolf Lewis. Teague and Fehon divorced in 1937.

His second wife was Ruth Mills with whom he co-authored the murder mystery You Can't Ignore Murder.

=== Career beginnings ===
Books on architecture in his high school library influenced Teague's desire to become an artist. At 19 years old, Teague left Indiana for New York City. He studied painting from 1903 to 1907 at the Art Students League of New York, where he met his first wife, Celia Fehon, a fellow artist. To earn money upon his arrival in New York, Teague checked hats at the Young Men's Christian Association in Manhattan, where he also began sign painting. His lettering work evolved into illustration projects for mail order catalogues, for which he drew apparel items such as neckties and shoes. Refusing involvement in the fashion industry, Teague focused his creative efforts on elaborate advertising illustrations, which caught the attention of Walter Whitehead, an advertising executive whom Teague had met at the YMCA.

Whitehead hired Teague at the Ben Hampton Advertising Agency. When Whitehead left Ben Hampton for the larger agency of Calkins & Holden in 1908, Teague went with him. During Teague's four years at Calkins & Holden, he developed a distinct artistic style recognized by Earnest Elmo Calkins as a reconciliation of past art and present day production.

By 1911, Teague was an active freelancer in decorative design and typography. He also shared offices with Bruce Rogers and Frederic Goudy, and was a co-founder of Pynson Printers. Teague became known for his distinctive frames for advertising art, which blended Baroque and Renaissance influence with a simplicity ideal for high-volume printing presses.

In 1912, Teague left Calkins & Holden to expand his freelance work from his own typographic studio. Through his graphic design contributions to magazines, Teague's signature style earned widespread recognition in his field, particularly during the early 1920s when he designed frames for the famous Arrow Collar ads. "Teague borders" became a generic term for ad frames of a certain type, even those created by others.

By the mid-1920s, as the demand for border designs weakened, Teague had become lightly involved in commercial packaging. Intrigued by the International Paris Exposition and European stylistic movements, Teague left for Europe on June 30, 1926, to investigate European design. While abroad he familiarized himself with Bauhaus work during an exhibition in Italy, and became greatly inspired by the architectural creations and writings of Le Corbusier.

=== Pioneering an occupation ===
As the Great Depression loomed in America and mass-produced, machine-made objects intensified, large companies were desperate to find measures of survival. Stirred by European modernism, America's design heritage, and a keen understanding of modern market dynamics, Teague promoted new ideas about the impact and significance of design in American culture, fueled, so, too, by the desire to transform machine-made objects into contextual heirlooms.

Shortly before Teague concluded his 18-year advertising career, he partook in several commissions in product design, for which a growing number of clients sought counseling. At age 43, Teague established a sole proprietorship devoted to product and package design. By 1927, Teague added "Industrial Design" to his letterhead upon landing his first big client, Eastman Kodak.

Richard Bach, a curator of the Metropolitan Museum of Art, had recommended Teague to Adolph Stuber, a top manager of Rochester, New York-based Eastman Kodak, when the company was considering the assistance of an artist to design cameras. With no knowledge of cameras, Teague proposed working on-site in collaboration with Kodak engineers. Designing according to engineering necessities, insisted Teague, "ultimately leads to greater beauty and heavier sales." In Teague's Forbes article, "Modern Design Needs Modern Merchandising," published February 1, 1928, he advises, "The designer who gets results for the manufacturer plans with all departments of a business before he ever lays pencil to drawing board."

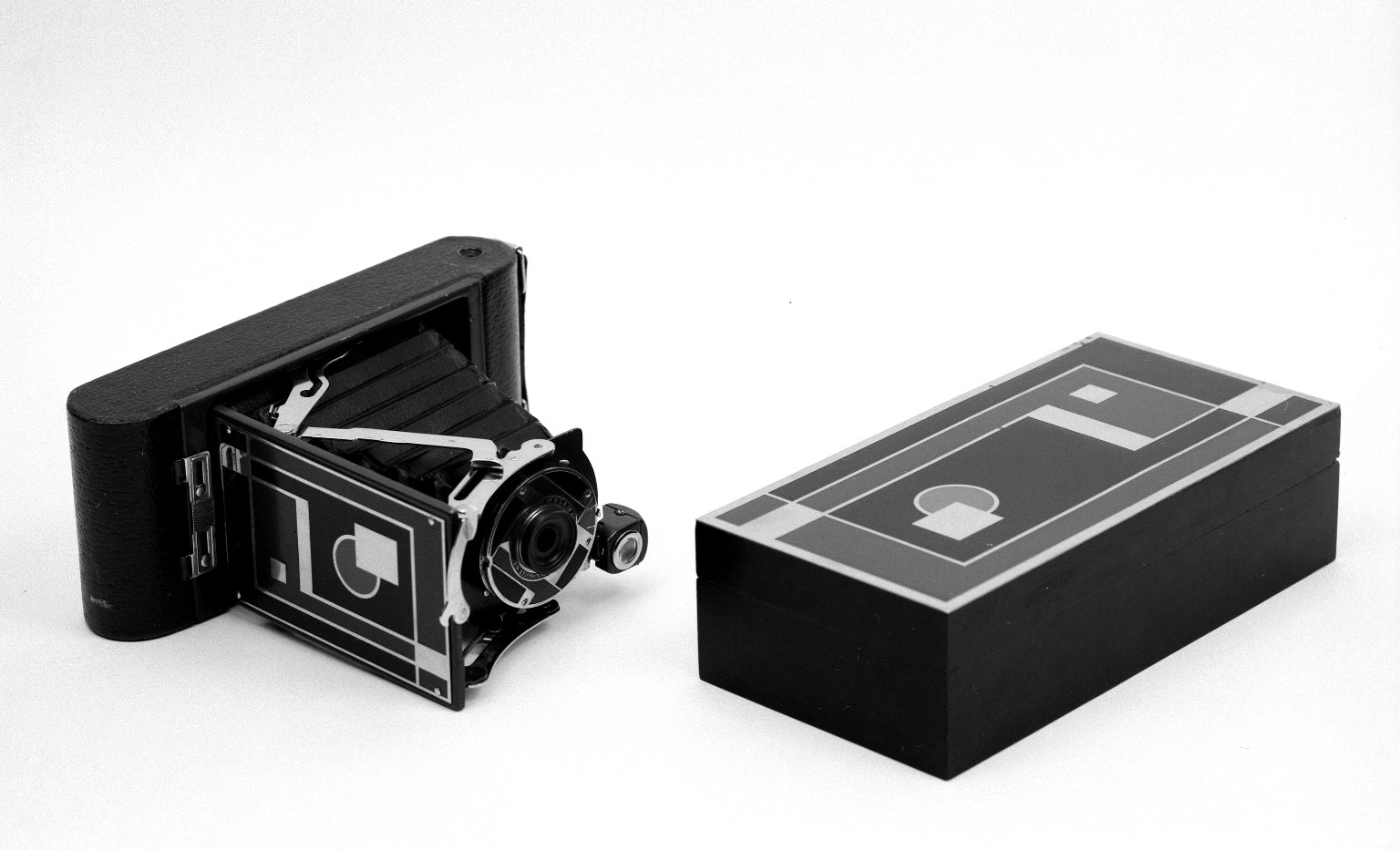
Camera, No. 1A Gift Kodak, ca.1930 Brooklyn Museum

On January 1, 1928, Teague embarked on a design endeavor that culminated in an extensive relationship with Kodak—that would last until his death. He designed a number of well-known Kodak cameras, including an Art Deco gift camera (1928), the Baby Brownie (1934), the Bantam Special (1936) (considered a masterpiece of Art Deco styling and one of the most popular cameras ever produced,) and the Brownie Hawkeye (1950). By redesigning the camera case to match the camera, the two items presented a unity difficult to break during purchase; thus, the sales of carrying cases increased four times over in 1934.

Teague's camera designs for Kodak expanded into the design of Kodak's displays, retail spaces, and exhibits. By 1934, the company created an entire styling division, to which Teague's role became advisory.

=== Design expansion & corporate identity ===
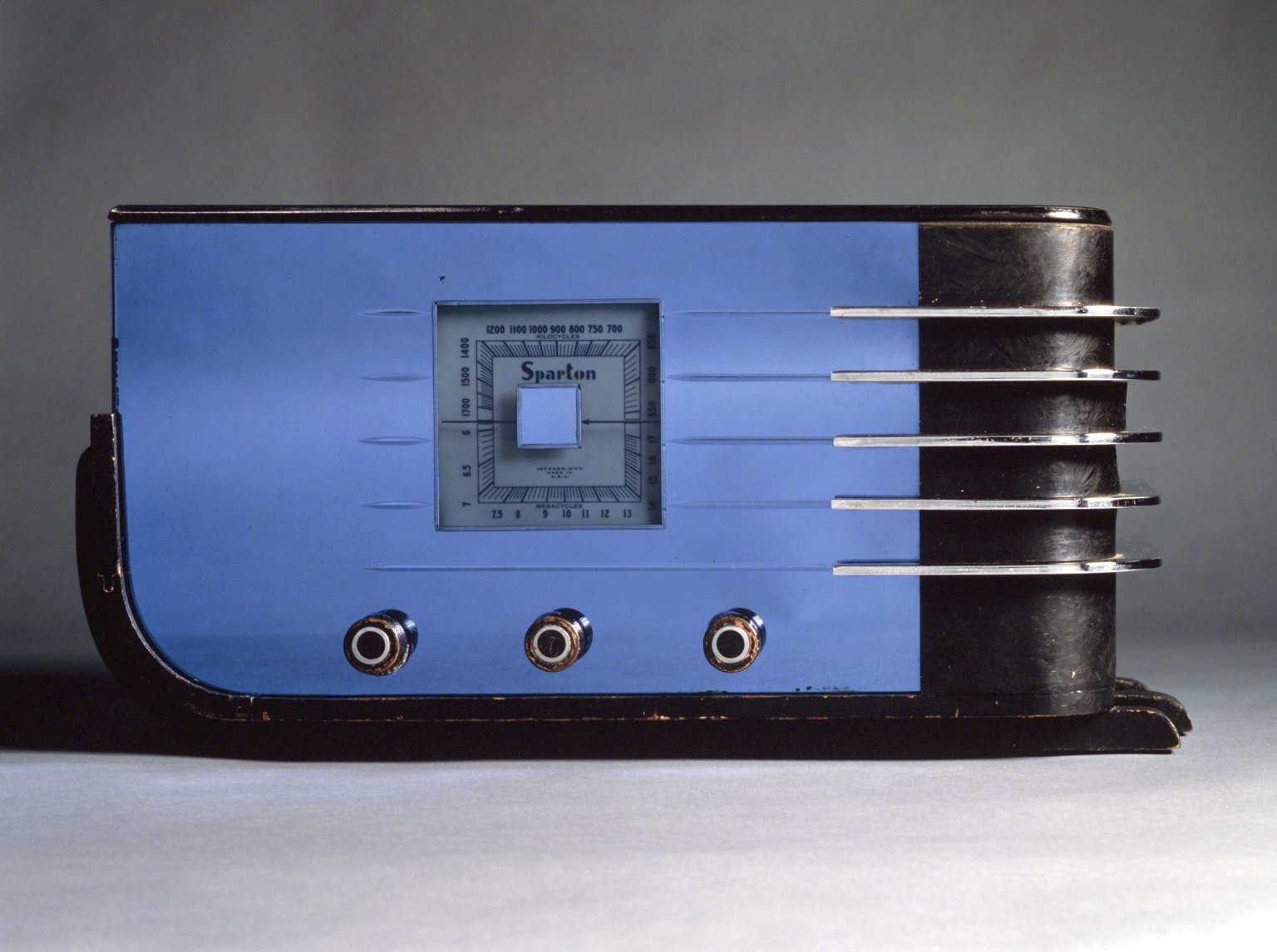
Sparton Model 557 'Sled' Table Radio, ca. 1936 Brooklyn Museum

Within two years of his first endeavor with Eastman Kodak, Teague's scope of industrial design work and number of clients multiplied. While design culture sustained a rather elitist attainability through the 1930s, Teague pursued strategic relationships with large businesses selling products to the masses. In addition to gaining widespread attention for such designs as the Marmon V-16, the first automobile to be conceived by an industrial designer, designed by Teague and his son, Walter Dorwin Teague, Jr., and the Steinway Peace Piano, Teague's work also included 32 design patterns for Steuben Glass, a division of Corning Glass Works, three radios produced by Sparton (the 'Bluebird' and 'Sled' table models and the 'Nocturne' console), and the design of passenger cars and diners for the New York, New Haven, and Hartford Railroad.

The concept of "Corporate Identity" emerged from the cross-disciplined work of commercial design and the human-designed environment, first shown through Teague's retail-space design for Eastman Kodak. Elevating this concept into a first-of-its-kind corporate identity program for Texaco Company, Teague created an expansive brand image that included the design of full station layouts for Texaco service stations, pumps, signs, cans, and trucks. More than 20,000 of these art-deco style stations had been built worldwide by 1960.

=== World's Fairs and expositions ===
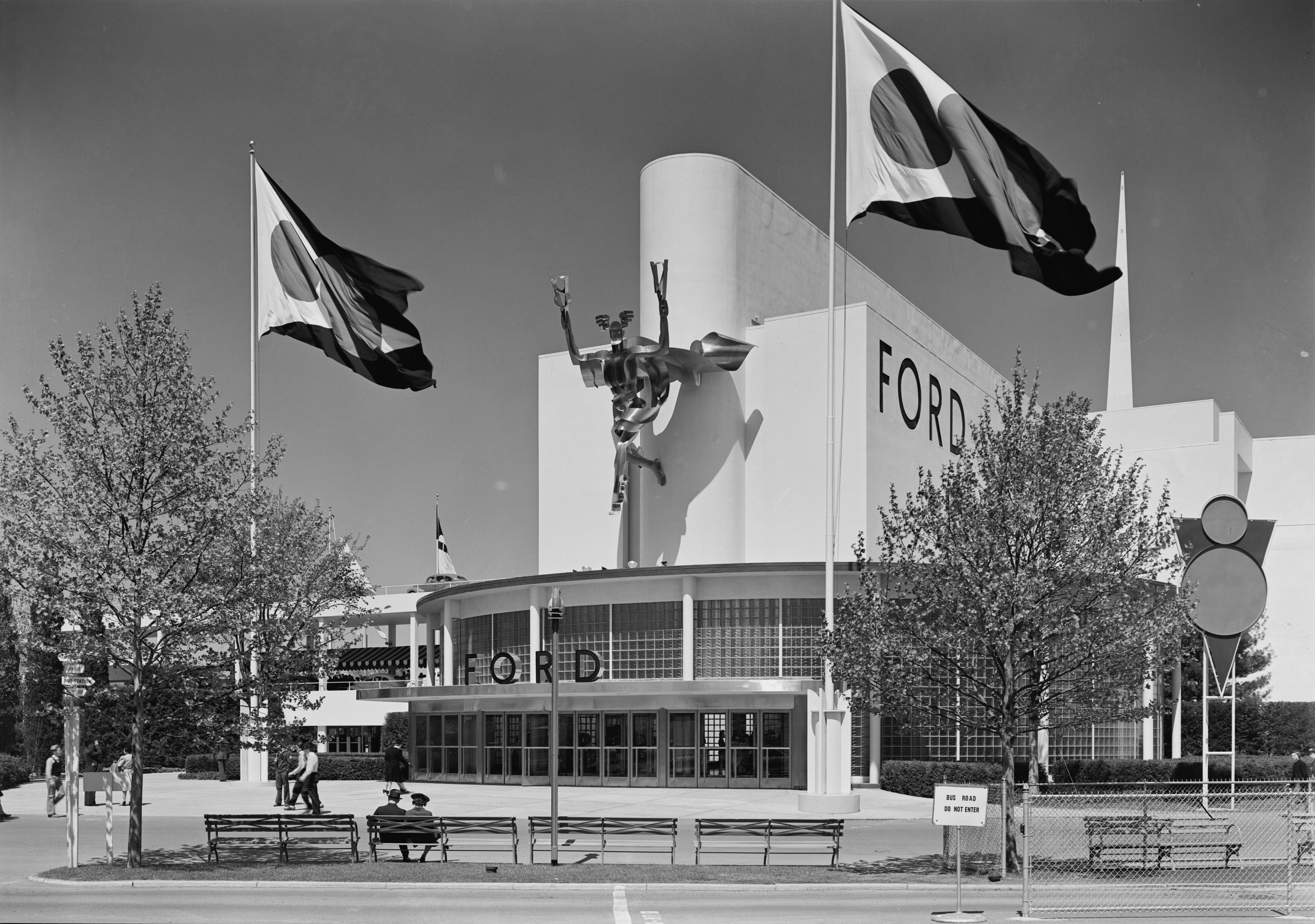
Ford pavilion at the 1939 New York World's Fair

In the 1930s and 1940s, corporate identity was prolifically popularized in America through elaborate fairs and expositions, which showcased industry sponsors' contributions to modern living. Teague—who, prior, had no formal training in architecture or engineering—succeeded in becoming licensed as an architect in New York State.

Teague commenced his deep involvement in exhibition design with his work on the Ford Building at Chicago's Century of Progress 1933-34 fair, for which he prepared for three months, commuting between Detroit and New York. His architectural contributions also included the Texaco exhibition hall at the 1935 Texas Centennial Exposition in Dallas, Texas, and the Ford pavilion for the 1935 California Pacific International Exposition in Balboa Park in San Diego.

Teague made a substantial impact on the 1939 New York World's Fair as one of seven members of the Fair's design board, and was also responsible for nine corporate displays. In addition to his design of the Ford and U.S. Steel pavilions, Teague introduced the new National Cash Register 100 Model, exemplifying "art moderne", with a seven-story high cash register placed atop the NCR exhibition, also shown at the 1939 Golden Gate International Exhibition in San Francisco.

Teague's additional exhibition work includes that for the 1957 Milan Triennial, 1961 Civil War Centennial Dome in Richmond, Virginia, the US Science Center for the 1962 Seattle World's Fair, as well as the "House of the Future" for the Festival of Gas at the 1964 New York World's Fair.

=== Post-WWII: confirming a profession ===
Teague, along with fellow industrial designer pioneers Raymond Loewy and Henry Dreyfuss, experienced monumental success following World War II. The post-war economic boom fueled the American consumer's desire for more and better products, intensifying the demand for industrial design among American businesses.

In 1944, Teague successfully defended the assertion that industrial design was a profession, citing its contributions to the public good before the appeals court in New York State, setting a national precedent.

=== Walter Dorwin Teague Associates ===
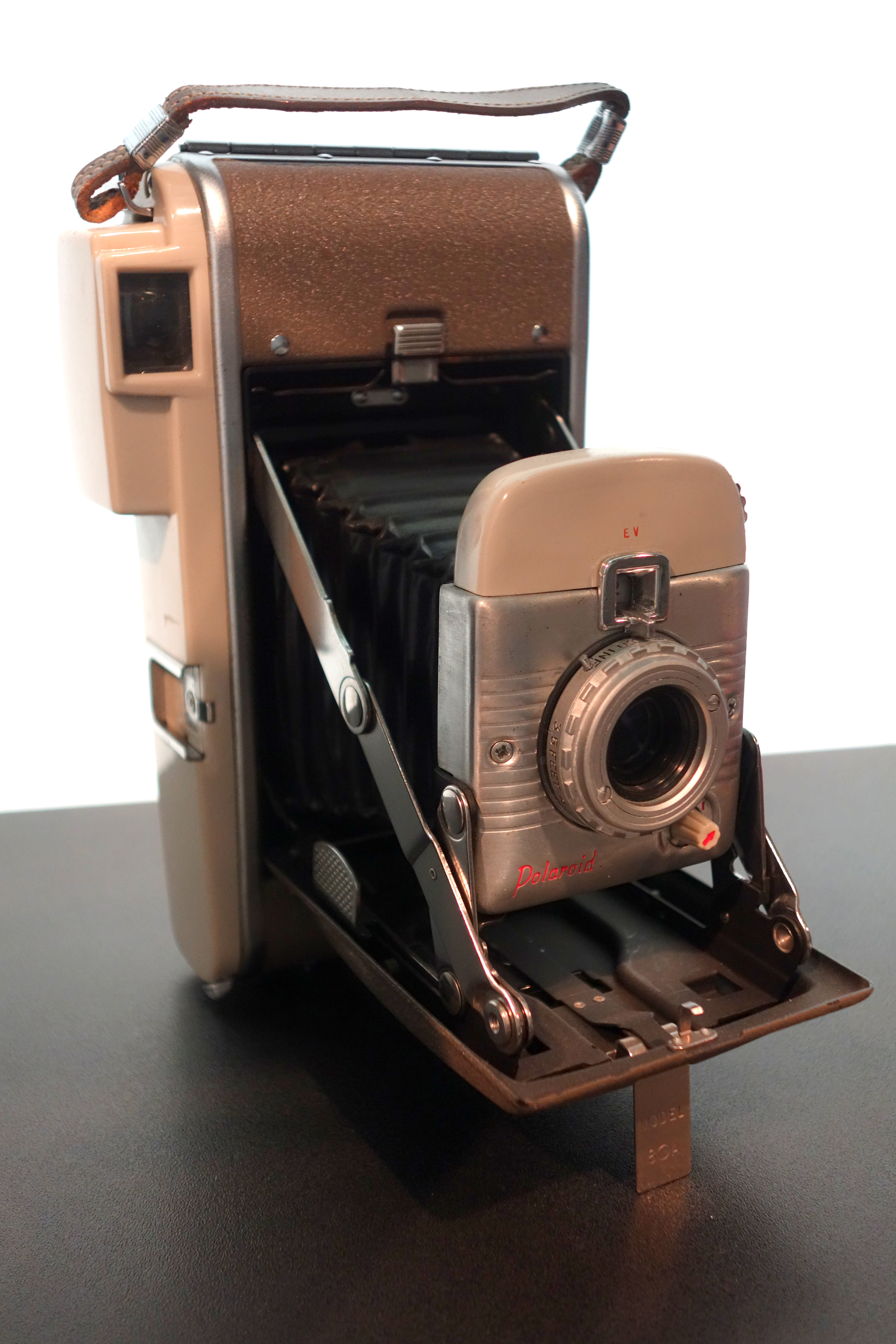
Polaroid camera, MIT Museum

As early as his first Kodak designs, Teague had accumulated a team of expert associates. By 1938, Teague's office grew to 55 employees, including architects, engineers, 3D artists and industrial designers. Teague had also signed his first design retainer contract with Polaroid, culminating in the development of the Land Camera, the first camera able to develop its own prints, introduced in 1948. In 1945, when Teague's growing studio of designers, architects and technicians was supplemented with an engineering division, Teague changed his company structure from a sole proprietorship to a partnership, allowing senior staff to be partners in Walter Dorwin Teague Associates. In 1946, Frank Del Giudice (who would later become the company's president) represented WDTA in seeking commissions from The Boeing Company, not only commencing WDTA's lasting relationship with Boeing, but the company's substantial impact in aerospace.

By 1959, WDTA's client list included Ac'cent, Polaroid, Schaefer Beer, Procter & Gamble, UPS, Steinway, General Foods Corporation, Boeing, Con Edison, Du Pont, US Steel, NASA, and the US Navy. A 1959 Fortune survey reported that WDTA was then second in gross revenue among those industrial design firms also doing architecture and interior design (Raymond Loewy Associates was first).

Accredited with iconic designs such as the UPS truck, Pringles Potato Chips canister, Scope Mouthwash bottle, Reagan-era Air Force One, Polaroid Land Camera, and more.

Walter Dorwin Teague Associates is now known as Teague. The privately held Seattle-based company is most commonly recognized today for its work in consumer electronics, aviation, digital, virtual reality, and autonomous vehicle interaction design. Its clients include Microsoft, Hewlett-Packard, Samsung, Panasonic, and Boeing, and projects such as the Xbox and the Boeing 787 Dreamliner.

=== Society of Industrial Designers (SID) ===
Teague, Loewy and Dreyfuss, as well as 15 East Coast designers, established the Society of Industrial Designers (SID) as "tangible evidence of the arriving maturity of the field," according to Teague, who also said, "Its purpose is to define and maintain standards of ethics and performance within the profession, and to guide and improve the still somewhat experimental education of future designers. For his accomplishments in establishing industrial design as a profession, Teague was named the first president of SID in February 1944.

In 1955, the SID changed its name to the American Society of Industrial Design (ASID), and by 1965 the organization had evolved into today's Industrial Designers Society of America (IDSA).

=== Death ===
Teague died in Flemington, New Jersey on December 5, 1960, less than a year after addressing the Royal Society of the Arts, and less than two weeks shy of his 77th birthday. Twice married, Teague was survived by his second wife Ruth, his two sons and his daughter (from his first marriage). His son, Walter Dorwin Teague Jr., who began working with his father in 1934, also devoted his career to industrial design until his own death in 2004.

=== Posthumous recognition ===
In 1963, the ASID honored Teague by offering the organization's first scholarship program, The Walter Dorwin Teague Scholarship, eligible to select junior students majoring in industrial design. The first scholarship of $1000 was presented in May 1964.

In 2007, Teague posthumously won the Personal Recognition Award from IDSA.

In January 2011, Teague was one of twelve honored by the United States Postal Service as "the nation's most important and influential industrial designers," with a special edition of postal stamps. The Smithsonian's Cooper-Hewitt National Design Museum was the setting for the dedication.

In August 2014, Teague was named to the Academy of Fellows by the IDSA. Such recommendations are for members in good standing who have earned the special respect and affection of the membership through distinguished service to the society and to the profession as a whole."

=== Biographical Documentary Film ===
In 2014 the feature documentary film "Teague: Design & Beauty" by independent filmmaker, Jason A. Morris, premiered in Austin, Texas. The film documented Teague's life, his rise to prominence, his turbulent relationship with a rebellious son, and the stories behind some of his greatest designs. The film was an official selection at the 2015 Newport Beach Film Festival, Trail Dance Film Festival, and San Diego Design Film Festival. It was also screened at design schools and museums across the United States.

== Publications ==
Teague's best-known book, Design This Day: The Technique of Order in the Machine Age, was first published in 1940, as the first book on the whole subject of industrial design, tracing the development of modern design and outlining necessary techniques to the solution of design problems. Described as a "milestone" in the industry, the book explores the evolution of civilization's reliance on increased industrialization and explains the designer's role. Teague (the company) reprinted the book in 2006. Teague also wrote Land of Plenty, A Summary of Possibilities (1947), and, with John Storck, Flour for Man's Bread, a History of Milling (1952).

Teague's writings were published in Forbes, Art & Industry, New Yorker, the Seventh International Management Congress, Interiors, Business Week, Art and Decoration, Museum of Modern Art and Metropolitan Museum of Art archived texts, among others.

Teague co-authored a murder mystery novel with his second wife Ruth Mills Teague. You Can't Ignore Murder was published in 1942.

== Museums ==
Teague's product designs, texts, photographs, and archives are featured in major museums around the world. Among those that have featured Teague's works:

- Metropolitan Museum of Art, New York City
- Museum of Modern Art, New York City
- Smithsonian Art Museum; 1939 Steinway Peace Piano
- San Francisco Museum of Modern Art; Design & Architecture collections
- Wolfsonian; pieces of the World's Fairs & Exhibitions collection (March 2012)
- Brooklyn Museum; "Walter Dorwin Teague" collection (March 2012)
- Smithsonian Cooper-Hewitt National Design Museum; Product Design and Decorative Arts Collection (March 2012)
- Cleveland Museum of Art; Century of Progress Prints (March 2012)
- Philbrook Museum of Art, Tulsa, Oklahoma
- Chicago Art Institute
- High Museum of Art, Atlanta, Georgia
