= American Flyer (railcar) =

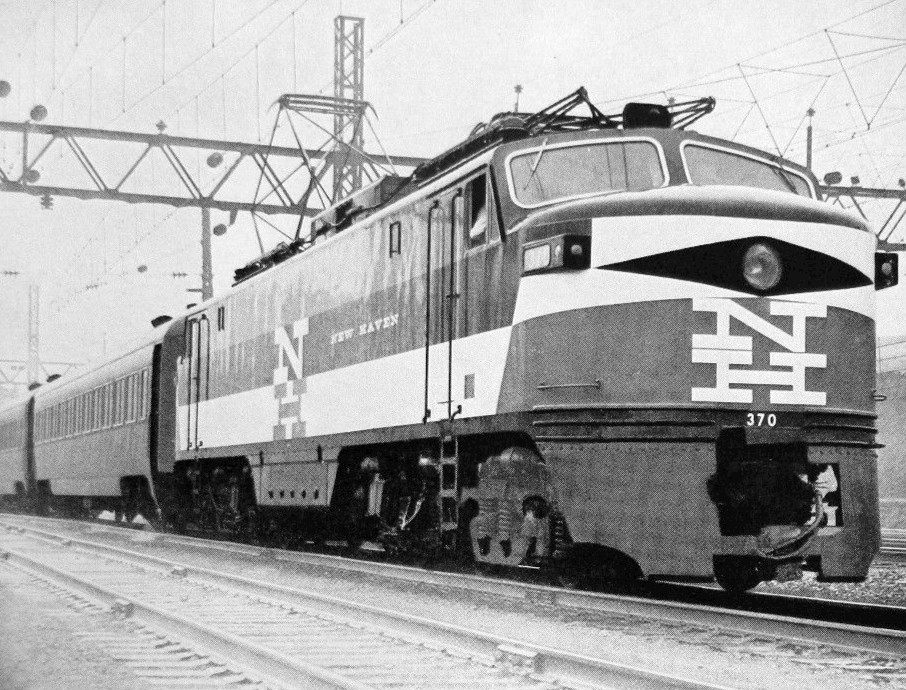
Two American Flyer coaches behind a New Haven EP-5 electric locomotive.

The American Flyer was an early streamlined American passenger railcar built by Pullman-Standard in the 1930s. They were the first streamlined equipment operated in New England and acquired their name from the model trains that their design inspired.

== Characteristics ==
American Flyer railcars weighed about 55 tons and were built out of light-weight steel alloys such as Cor-Ten that made them about 15 tons lighter than earlier designs and allowed for the use of two-axle General Steel Castings trucks instead of the previously standard three-axle designs. They were designed by Walter Dorwin Teague, and the first order for 50 coaches, with an 84 passenger capacity, was placed by the New Haven Railroad with Pullman-Standard in March 1934. Built at the former Osgood Bradley Car Company facility in Worcester, Massachusetts, these cars were delivered starting in December 1934, and were followed by 20 more in 1936 and 30 in 1938 in an identical configuration. In 1937 and 1938, 100 more coaches in a 92 passenger configuration for commuter service were delivered.

== Production ==
In 1935, the Boston and Maine Railroad ordered ten 84-seat and twenty-one 98-seat coaches, followed in 1937 by twenty 92-seat coaches. The Bangor and Aroostook Railroad acquired nine cars of the American Flyer design in 1937 and 1938—four combination mail and baggage cars, three combination food service and coach cars, and two 84-seat coaches. Outside New England, ten American Standard cars were purchased by the Seaboard Air Line Railroad, ten by the St. Louis Southwestern Railway, ten by the Lehigh Valley Railroad, and four by the Kansas City Southern Railway. Production ceased by the end of the 1930s.

== In preservation ==
A Bangor and Aroostook car converted into MoW service survives at the Shelburne Falls Trolley Museum Two examples of the type, both New Haven Railroad coaches, were purchased by the Railroad Museum of New England for preservation.
