= GE Genesis =

Series of locomotives

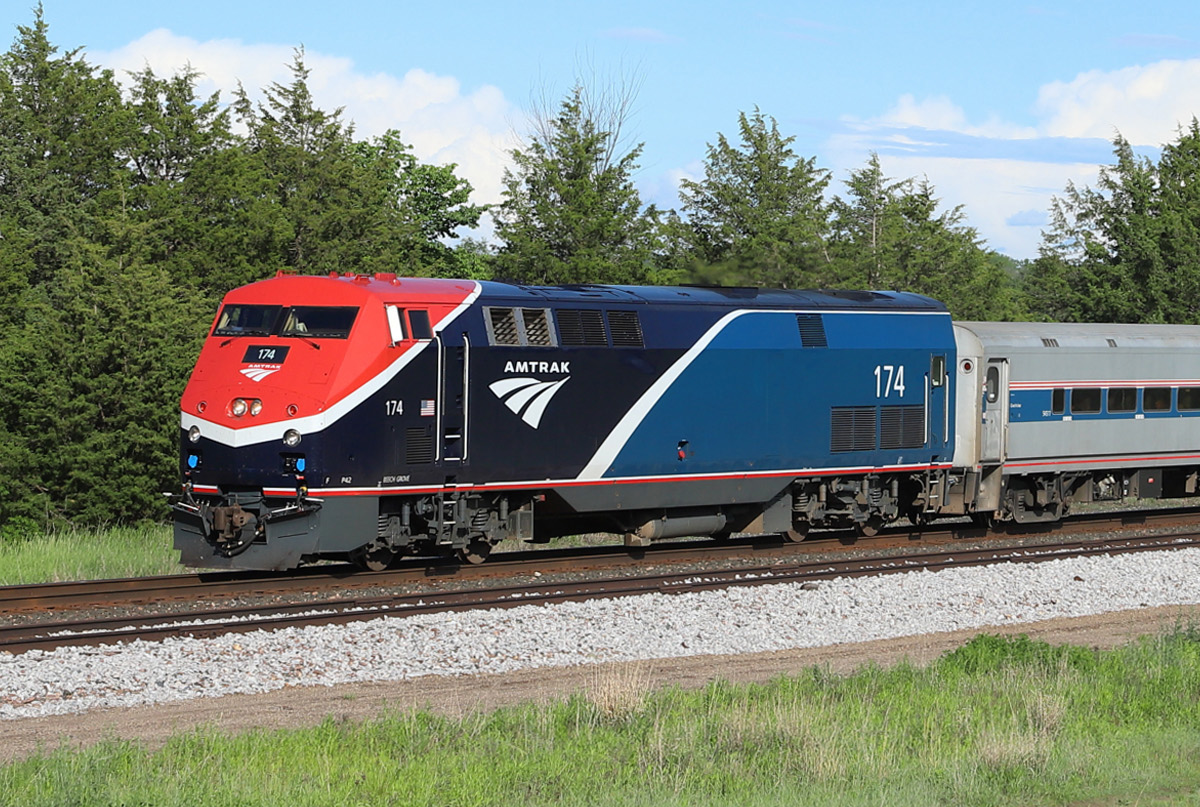
- GE P42DC No. 174 on the Borealis in 2024
Type and origin
- Power type: Diesel–electric or dual-mode
- Builder: GE Transportation Systems
- Model: P40DC, P32AC-DM, P42DC
- Build date: 1992–2001
- Total produced: 321
- Number rebuilt: 19
Specifications
- Configuration
  - AAR: B-B
  - UIC: Bo′Bo′
- Gauge: 4 ft 8 1/2 in (1,435 mm) standard gauge
- Trucks: Krupp-MaK high-speed bolsterless
- Wheel diameter: 40 in (1,016 mm)
- Minimum curve: 251 ft (77 m) radius/ 22.85° (single unit); 318 ft (97 m) radius/ 18.2° (coupled)
- Wheelbase: 43 ft 2 1/2 in (13.17 m) (between truck centers)
- Length: 69 ft 0 in (21.03 m)
- Width: 10 ft 0 in (3.05 m)
- Height: 14 ft 4 in (4.37 m)
- Axle load: 72,000 lb (32,659 kg) Max
- Adhesive weight: 100%
- Loco weight: P40DC, P42DC: 268,240 lb (121,672 kg); P32AC-DM: 274,400 lb (124,466 kg)
- Fuel type: Diesel
- Fuel capacity: 2,200 US gal (8,300 L) (DC); 1,800 US gal (6,800 L) (AC)
- Lubricant cap.: 410 US gal (1,600 L) (DC); 365 US gal (1,380 L) (AC)
- Coolant cap.: 380 US gal (1,400 L) (DC); 210 US gal (790 L) (AC)
- Sandbox cap.: 26 cu ft (740 L) (DC); 8.5 cu ft (240 L) (AC)
- Electric system/s: Third rail, 750 V DC (P32AC-DM)
- Current pickup: Contact shoe (P32AC-DM)
- Prime mover: GE 7FDL16 (P40DC, P42DC), GE 7FDL12 (P32AC-DM)
- RPM range: 200–1050 (600–900 while supplying HEP)
- Engine type: 45° V16, four stroke cycle (P40DC, P42DC), 45° V12, four stroke cycle (P32AC-DM)
- Aspiration: Turbocharged
- Displacement: 175.2 L (10,690 cu in) (7FDL16); 131.4 L (8,020 cu in) (7FDL12)
- Alternator: GMG 195 (P40DC, P42DC); GMG 195A1 (P32AC-DM)
- Traction motors: GE 752AH (DC), GE GEB15 (AC)
- Cylinders: 16 (P40DC, P42DC); 12 (P32AC-DM)
- Cylinder size: 10.95 L (668 cu in)
- Transmission: AC-DC
- MU working: Yes
- Train heating: Locomotive-supplied head-end power
- Loco brake: Dynamic / Regenerative / Electropneumatic
- Train brakes: Electropneumatic
Performance figures
- Maximum speed: 103 mph (166 km/h) (original P40DC); 110 mph (177 km/h) (P42DC, P32AC-DM, upgraded P40DC); 60 mph (97 km/h) (in electric mode; P32AC-DM only)
- Power output: 3,200 hp (2,400 kW) (P32AC-DM); 4,000 hp (3,000 kW) (original P40DC); 4,250 hp (3,170 kW) (upgraded P40DC, P42DC)
- Tractive effort: P40DC, P42DC: Starting: 280.25 kN (63,000 lbf); Continuous: 169 kN (38,000 lbf) @38 mph (61.2 km/h); P32AC-DM: Starting: 275.8 kN (62,000 lbf) @14 mph (23 km/h); Continuous: 113.43 kN (25,500 lbf) @64 mph (103 km/h)
- Factor of adh.: 4.25 (DC); 4.4258 (AC)
Career
- Operators: Amtrak, Metro-North Railroad, Via Rail, CT Rail
- Numbers: Amtrak: P42DC 1–207; P32AC-DM 700–717; P40DC 800–843; Metro-North: P32AC-DM 201–231; VIA Rail Canada: P42DC 900–920; CT Rail: P40DC 6700–6711
- Official name: Genesis
- Preserved: Metro-North No. 221
- Disposition: Operational, several units retired from wrecks, one preserved

The GE Genesis (officially trademarked GENESIS) is a series of passenger diesel locomotives built by GE Transportation for Amtrak, Metro-North, and Via Rail between 1992 and 2001. A total of 321 units were produced.

Designed to meet Amtrak's specifications, the Genesis series is 14 feet 4 inches (4.37 m) tall. This allows for easier travel through low-clearance tunnels in the Northeast Corridor, especially compared to the earlier EMD F40PH which was 14 inches (356 mm) taller.

== Technical design ==
The GE Genesis series use a lightweight monocoque carbody design, styled by industrial designer Cesar Vergara. GE claims this approach improves aerodynamics and fuel efficiency compared to its predecessors.

Amtrak equips its Genesis locomotives with bolt-on nose cones to facilitate rapid repairs in the event of a grade crossing collision. Amtrak also modified the headlight design on their Genesis locomotives over time, removing the pentagonal cover over the headlights (which required a special tool to service which was often unavailable) in favor of an oval-shaped cover-less opening.

Compared to the F40PH locomotives it replaced, the GE Genesis has 22% better fuel efficiency and delivers 25% more power.

Further enhancing reliability, the Genesis is a fully computerized locomotive. Its onboard computer systems automatically manage various functions, including real-time adjustments to engine output in response to overheating, low oil pressure, or reduced airflow intake. This ensures continued operation during minor operational deviations, streamlining maintenance requirements.

All Genesis locomotives provide head-end power (HEP) to the train via an alternator or inverter powered by the main engine. This system delivers a maximum output of 800 kilowatts (1,100 hp), capable of powering up to 16 Superliner railcars. The P40DC and P42DC models offer two HEP configurations: normal mode with the engine speed locked at 900 rpm for providing both HEP and traction power, and standby mode with the engine speed locked at 720 rpm for HEP only (no traction power). The P32AC-DM offers greater operational flexibility with its HEP inverter. The engine can run at 1,047 rpm while delivering both traction power and HEP. Additionally, it can idle at 620 rpm (notch three) while still providing HEP for lighting and air conditioning when not in use for traction.

The Genesis uses trucks manufactured by Krupp Verkehrstechnik [de], which has since been acquired by Siemens Mobility. Newer Genesis locomotives reflect this change and carry the Siemens name.

== Models ==
Three models of Genesis were built by General Electric, the P40DC, P42DC, and P32AC-DM.

=== P40DC ===
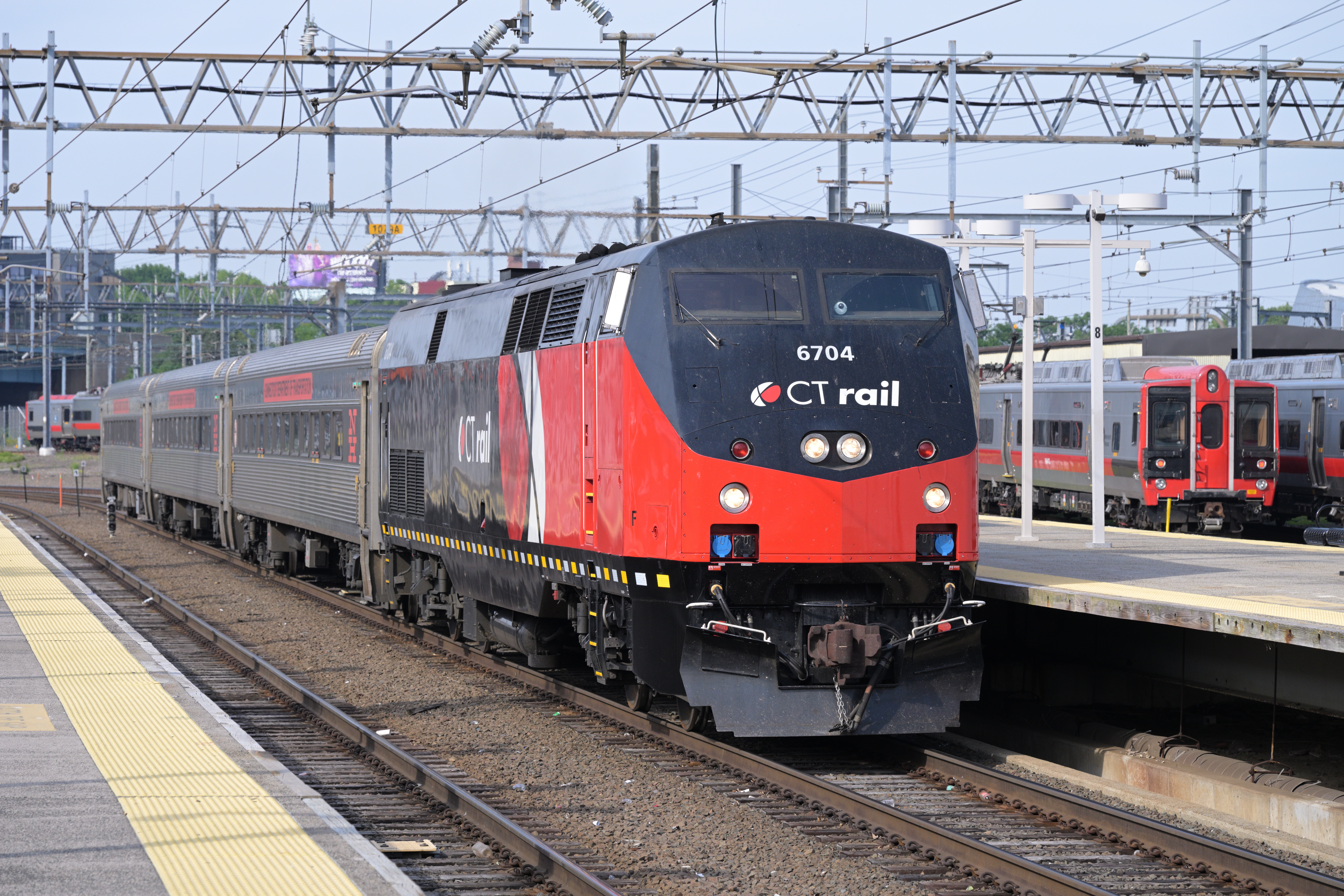
CT Rail P40DC No. 6704 at New Haven Union Station

The P40DC (GENESIS Series I) or Dash 8-40BP (originally known as the AMD-103 for Amtrak Monocoque Diesel - 103MPH) is the first model in the Genesis series, built in 1993. The locomotive operates in a diesel-electric configuration that uses DC to power the traction motors, producing 4,000 horsepower (2,980 kW) at 1047 rpm. Power output to the traction motors is 3,550 hp (2,650 kW) when running in HEP mode (900 rpm) with a 0 kW HEP load. Traction power in HEP mode decreases to 2,525 horsepower (1,880 kW) when providing the maximum 800 kW (1,100 hp) HEP load to the train. The P40DC is geared for a maximum speed of 103 miles per hour (166 km/h). The P40DC was succeeded in 1996 by the P42DC.

A feature unique to the P40DC and P32AC-DM is a hostler stand at the rear of the locomotive providing increased visibility and reversing capabilities to the engineer while conducting reverse operations. When a unit is in operation from this stand it is limited to 10 mph (16 km/h) and a dead man's switch protects against movement without an operator being present. Another unique feature to the original P40DC were the two strobes above the cab and an emergency flasher between the strobes. When they were overhauled, those features were removed.

Both the P40DC and P42DC allowed Amtrak to operate heavy long-distance trains with fewer locomotives compared to the older EMD F40PH locomotives; two P40DCs could do the same work as three F40PHs.

Additional deliveries of the P42DC ended up replacing the P40DCs. Three units were prematurely wrecked (819 in the 1993 Big Bayou Canot train wreck, 807 and 829 in the 1999 Bourbonnais, Illinois, train crash) and scrapped. Eight were leased and later sold to the Connecticut DOT for Shore Line East in 2005, and four were rebuilt and sold to New Jersey Transit in 2007; NJ Transit sold its units to Connecticut Department of Transportation (CTDOT) in 2015. The remaining 28 units were placed out-of-service for many years. 15 of these units were rebuilt using 2009 ARRA stimulus funds and returned to service, now in the Phase V livery, except for 822, which was painted in Phase III Heritage livery for Amtrak's 40th Anniversary.

In January 2018, CTDOT awarded a contract to Amtrak to overhaul their twelve P40DC locomotives at the Beech Grove Shops. The first unit was completed in early 2021. With the introduction of M8 EMU trains for Shore Line East service, the rebuilt P40DCs are now exclusively used on the Hartford Line.

==== Upgraded and "Stimulus" P40DCs ====
By 2007, New Jersey Transit had upgraded their P40DC units with updated prime movers to match the 4,250 horsepower (3,170 kW) of the successor P42DC. This was done by readjusting the position of the lay shafts within the prime mover.

Amtrak returned 15 of their P40DC units to service as part of a project funded through Transportation Investment Generating Economic Recovery (TIGER) grants, which were part of the American Recovery and Reinvestment Act of 2009. The first of the units were returned to service in March 2010 after being overhauled at the Beech Grove Shops. They were upgraded like NJT's units had been a few years before to have 4,250 hp (3,170 kW) and match the P42DC's maximum speed of 110 mph (177 km/h). They also received updated cab signaling systems. The upgraded locomotives still had mechanical air brakes, which makes them most suitable for trains that only require a single locomotive. This differs from the electronic air brakes on the P42DC and P32AC-DM. They also featured a builder's plate indicating that they were rebuilt under the auspices of the TIGER program.

=== P42DC ===
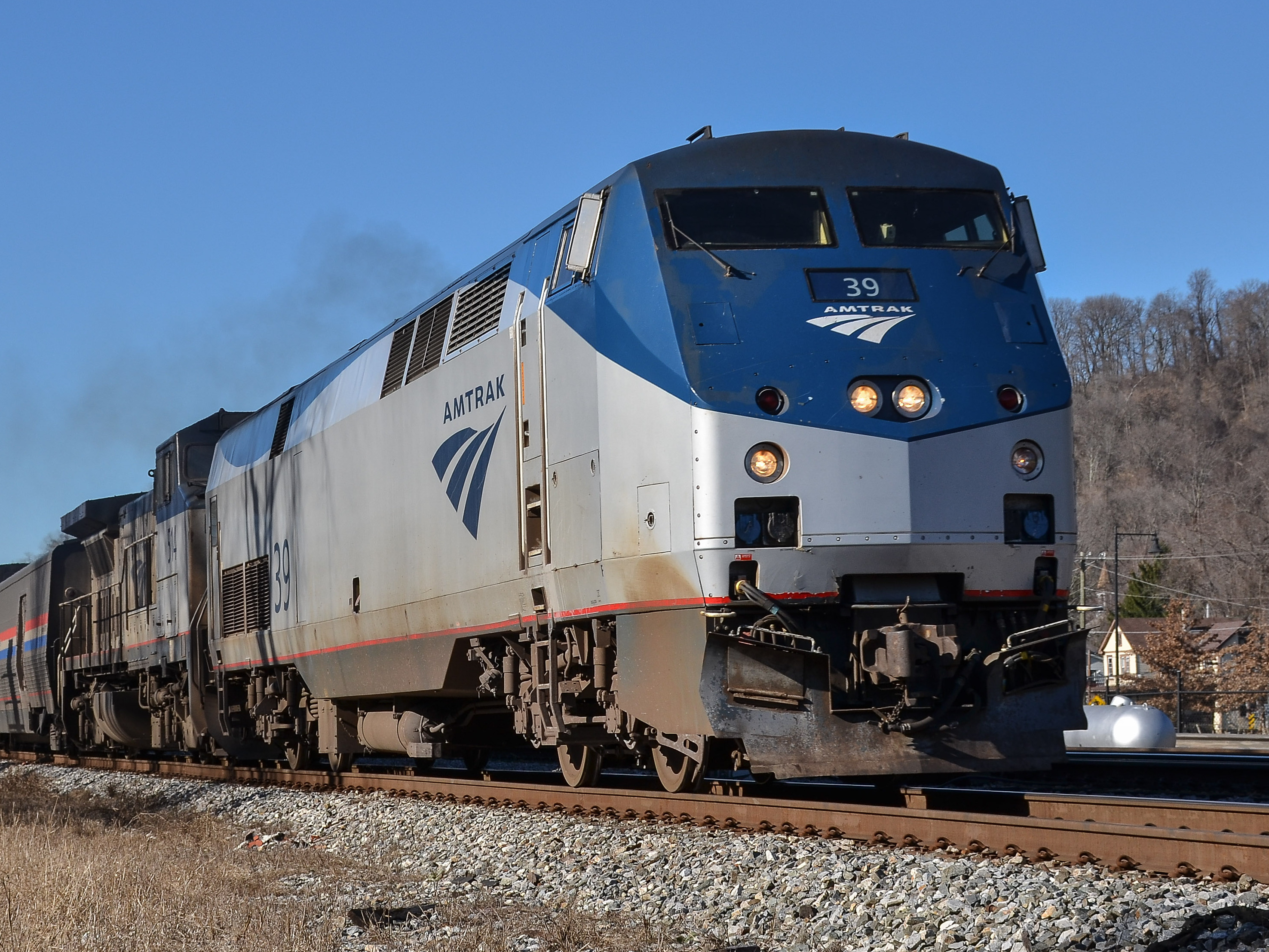
Amtrak P42DC No. 39 on the Capitol Limited

The P42DC (GENESIS Series I) is the successor model to the P40DC. It has an engine output of 4,250 horsepower (3,170 kW) at 1,047 rpm, or 3,550 horsepower (2,650 kW) when running in HEP mode (900 rpm) with a 0 kW HEP load. As with the P40DC, traction horsepower in HEP mode decreases to 2,525 horsepower (1,880 kW) when providing the full 800 kW HEP load to the train.

The P42DC has a maximum speed of 110 mph (177 km/h) compared to the 103 mph (166 km/h) maximum speed of the P40DC. Tractive effort is rated at 280.25 kN (63,000 lbf) of starting effort and 169 kN (38,000 lbf) of continuous effort at 38 mph (61 km/h) given wheel power of 3,850 horsepower (2,870 kW).

P42DCs are used primarily on most of Amtrak's long-haul and higher-speed rail service outside the Northeast and lower Empire Corridors. They will be replaced on long-distance service by 125 Siemens ALC-42 Charger locomotives between 2021 and 2024, but will remain in service on shorter corridor trains.

Via Rail Canada has also utilized P42DC (also designated as EPA-42as) since 2001. The P42DCs replaced the LRC locomotives that same year. They are currently on services with speeds up to 100 mph (161 km/h), mainly on the Quebec City-Windsor rail corridor.

==== P42C ====
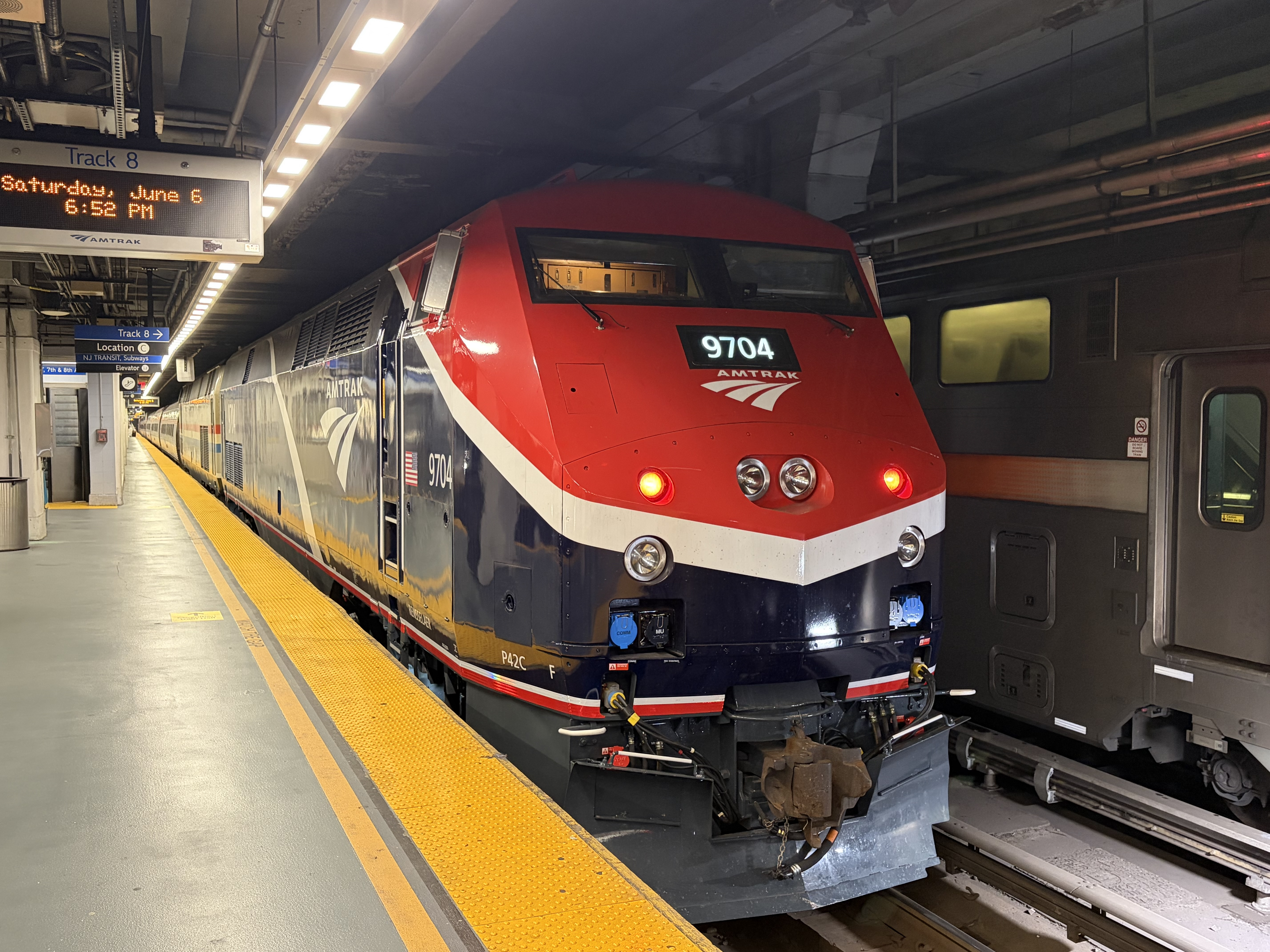
Amtrak P42C No. 9704 at New York Penn Station

The P42C is a non-powered control unit (cab car) converted by Amtrak from retired P42DC locomotives, with the first conversion completed in 2024. Amtrak plans to eventually convert 18 Genesis locomotives into P42Cs for use across its network. The first locomotive converted was former P42DC No. 184, which became P42C No. 9700. It entered service in June 2025.

Unlike the earlier NPCU conversions derived from F40PH locomotives, the P42Cs retain most of their internal components for ride quality purposes, as the earlier NPCUs were found to provide a rough ride for engineers due to insufficient weight. The P42Cs also differ from the original F40PH NPCUs in that they do not feature a baggage compartment. Because the P42DC uses a monocoque body design in which the carbody forms part of the locomotive's structural support, large side openings for the roll-up baggage doors could not be added.

=== P32AC-DM ===
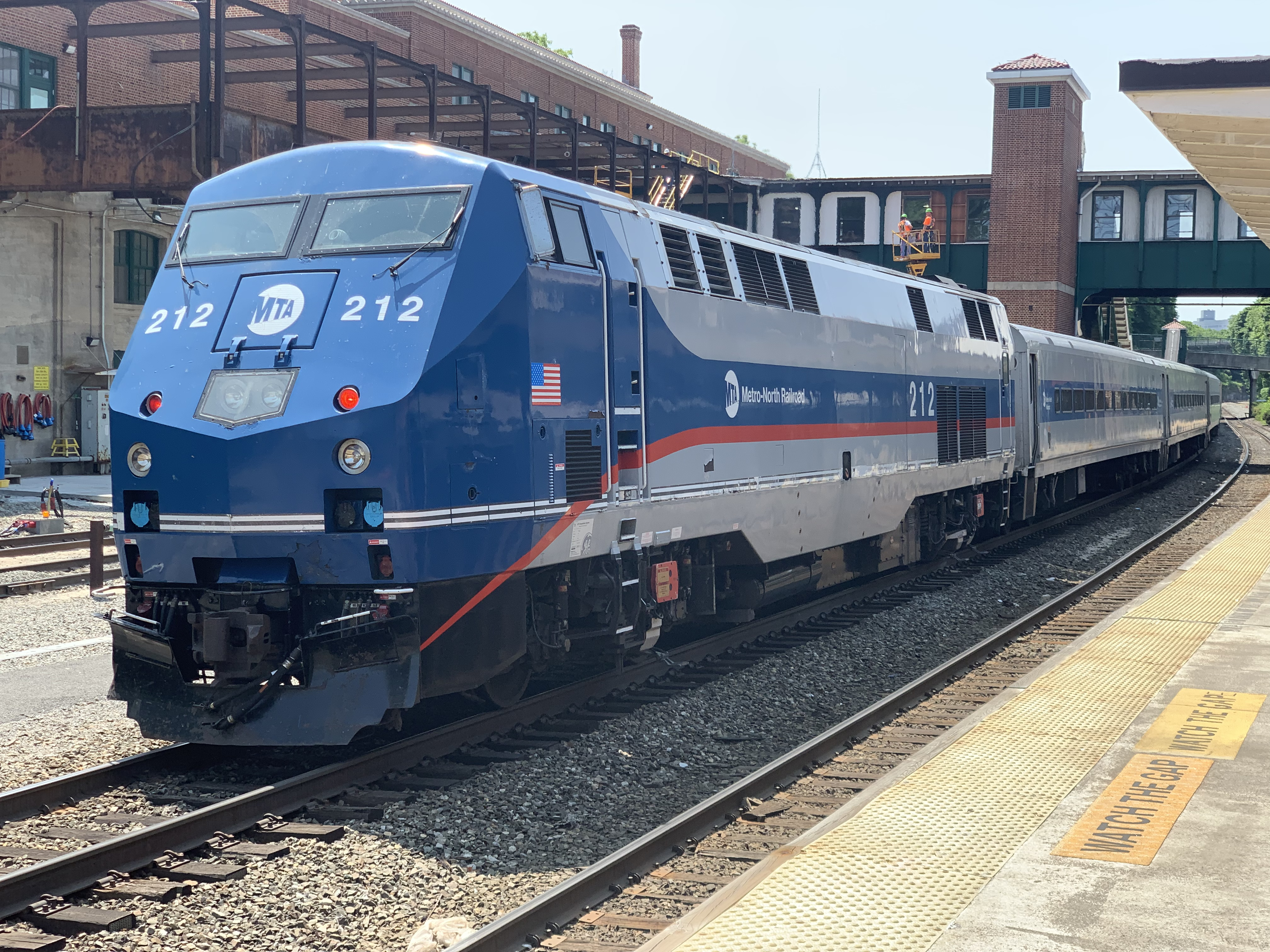
Metro-North P32AC-DM No. 212 at Poughkeepsie, New York, in 2023

The P32AC-DM (GENESIS Series 2, short for "Passenger, 3,200 hp (2,400 kW), Alternating Current, Dual Mode") was developed for both Amtrak and Metro-North. They can be powered either by their diesel prime mover or for a short duration via electricity from a 750 volt third rail. The third rail shoes are used on the over-running third rail into Penn Station for Amtrak units and the under-running third rail into Grand Central Terminal for Metro-North. The P32AC-DM is rated at 3,200 horsepower (2,390 kW), 2,900 horsepower (2,160 kW) when supplying HEP, and is geared for a maximum speed of 110 mph (177 km/h). Tractive effort is rated at 275.8 kN (62,000 lbf) of starting effort from zero to 14 mph (23 km/h) and 113.43 kN (25,500 lbf) of continuous effort at 40 mph (64 km/h) given wheel power of 2,700 horsepower (2,010 kW).

Unlike the other Genesis variants, the P32AC-DM uses AC (alternating current) traction motors rather than DC (direct current) motors, and has a smaller 12-cylinder prime mover instead of a 16-cylinder.

The P32AC-DM is only used on services operating north from New York City, where diesel emissions through its two fully enclosed main terminal stations are prohibited. Third rail use is limited; it can only be used for about 10 minutes due to thermal limitations. Metro-North's P32AC-DM's only use electric mode in the 4 miles of tunnel leading to Grand Central Terminal, and use diesel elsewhere even if third rail is available. This is in contrast to the new Siemens SC-42DM, which use electric mode everywhere third rail is available.

Amtrak rosters 18 P32AC-DM locomotives and uses them for its Empire Service, Ethan Allen Express, Lake Shore Limited (New York section), Adirondack, and Maple Leaf services, all of which travel to New York Penn Station. Metro-North rosters 31 P32AC-DM locomotives on push-pull trains to Grand Central Terminal; four are owned by CTDOT. The Metro-North and CTDOT fleet of P32AC-DM locomotives will be replaced in 2025–2027 by new Siemens SC-42DM Charger locomotives.

== Original owners ==
Railroad	Model	Quantity	Road numbers	Notes
Amtrak	P40DC	44	800–843	15 units upgraded to P42DC specifications. Replaced by Siemens Charger locomotives.
Amtrak	P42DC	207	1–207	To be replaced by Siemens Charger locomotives.
Amtrak	P32AC-DM	18	700–717	Dual mode for operation on the Empire Connection into New York Penn. To be replaced by Amtrak Airo trainsets.
Metro-North Railroad	P32AC-DM	31	201–224, 226–231, 250	Dual mode for operation into Grand Central Terminal. 228–231 owned by CTDOT. To be replaced by Siemens Charger locomotives. In 2026, 225 was renumbered to 250 in preparation for the United States Semiquincentennial. 221 preserved.
Via Rail	P42DC	21	900–920	To be replaced by Siemens Charger locomotives.

== Preservation ==
- Metro-North P32AC-DM No. 221 was purchased by the Adirondack Railroad for excursion service out of Utica, New York in September 2026.

== See also ==
- List of Amtrak rolling stock
- EMD F40PH
