= Budd Silverliner =

Electric multiple unit railcar

PRR MP85B / Silverliner (II)
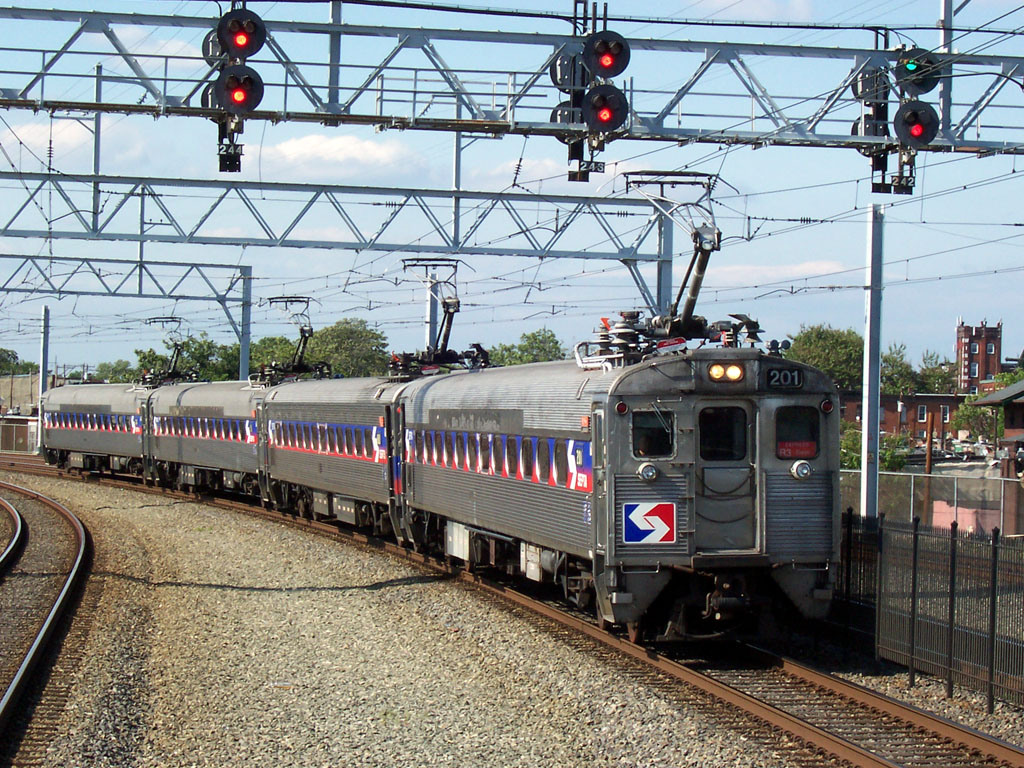
- Train led by the first Silverliner II #201 entering the Temple University Station in May 2006.

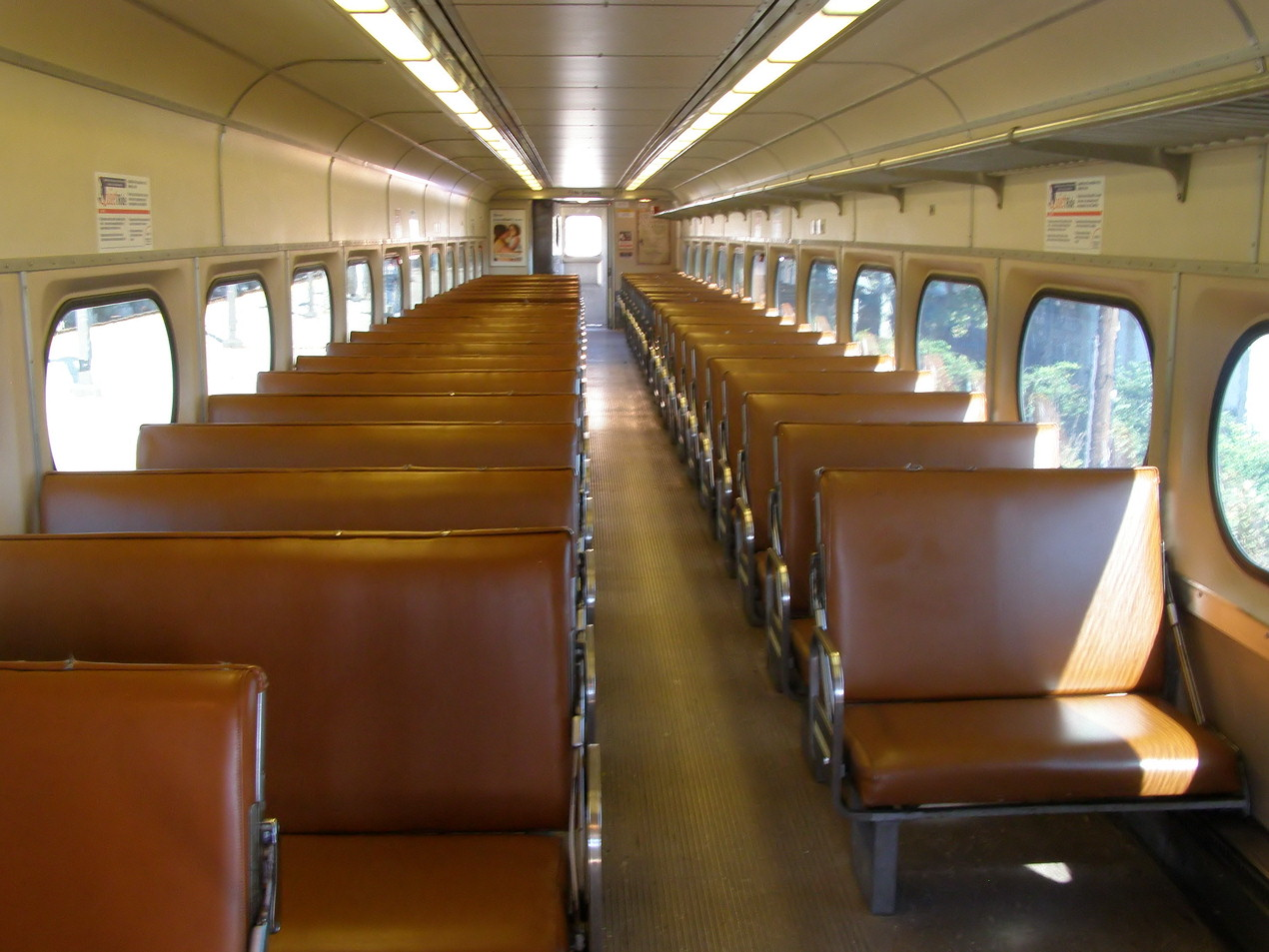
- Interior of a Budd Silverliner showing the leatherette decor applied to cars 259, 269, 9012 and 9015 in place of the standard "Ketchup and Mustard" styling
- In service: 1963–2012
- Manufacturer: Budd Company
- Built at: Red Lion Plant, Philadelphia
- Family name: Pioneer III
- Replaced: PRR MP54; Reading EMUs; Pioneer III
- Entered service: 1963
- Number built: 59
- Number preserved: 2
- Predecessor: Pioneer III
- Successor: Silverliner IV
- Formation: Single unit
- Fleet numbers: PRR cars: 201-219, 251-269; Reading cars: 9001-9017; USDOT cars: T1-T4
- Capacity: 124 w/ bathroom, 127 w/o
- Operators: Pennsylvania Railroad; Reading Railroad; Penn Central Railroad; Conrail; SEPTA

Specifications
- Car body construction: Stainless steel
- Car length: 85 ft (25.91 m)
- Width: 9 ft 11 1/2 in (3.035 m)
- Doors: 2 end doors w/ traps
- Maximum speed: 100 mph (160 km/h) design 85 mph (137 km/h) service
- Weight: 101,400 lb (46,000 kg)
- Traction system: Transformed line current fed through 4 mercury arc Ignitron rectifiers to a phase angle motor controller. All commuter cars later converted to silicon rectifier.
- Power output: 550 hp (410 kW)
- Electric system: 11-13.5 kV 25 Hz AC
- Current collection: Pantograph
- Braking system: Pneumatic
- Coupling system: Hybrid multi-function AAR tightlock later converted to WABCO Model N-2
- Track gauge: 4 ft 8 1/2 in (1,435 mm) standard gauge

The Budd Silverliner was a model of electric multiple unit railcar designed and built by the Budd Company with 59 examples being delivered starting in 1963. Fifty-five of the cars were purchased for the Reading and Pennsylvania Railroads with public funds for use in Philadelphia, Pennsylvania, area commuter rail service with the remaining 4 cars being purchased by USDOT for use in high-speed rail experiments in 1965. Based on a series of 6 prototype Pioneer III cars built in 1958, the Silverliners represented the first production order of "modern" commuter MU equipment purchased by either railroad and earned their name from their unpainted stainless steel construction which contrasted with the painted carbon steel bodies of the pre-war MU fleets. The cars became a fixture of SEPTA Regional Rail service providing the name to their entire series of EMU railcars before finally being retired in 2012 after 49 years in service.

== History ==
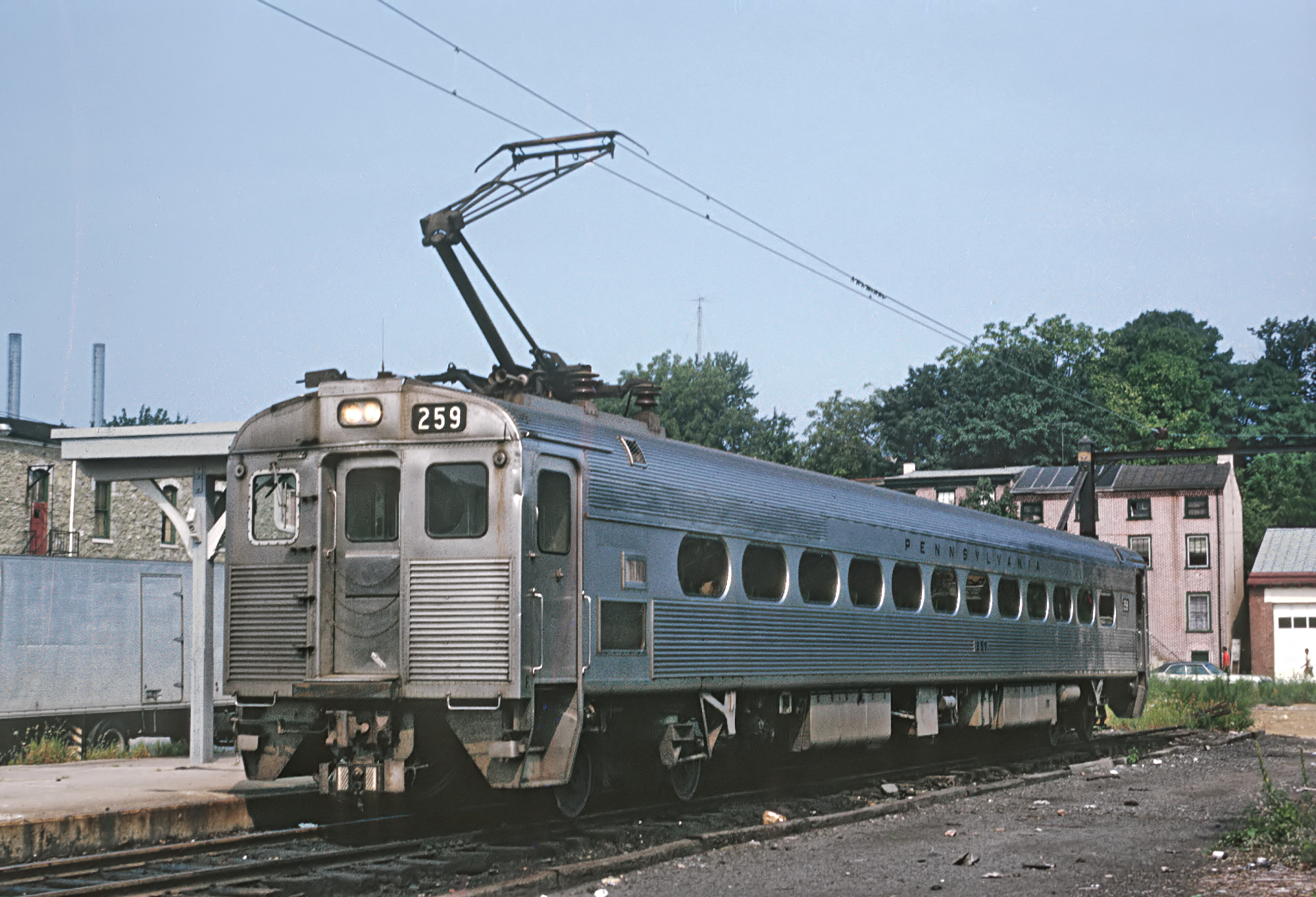
Penn Central Silverliner II operating for commuter service in West Chester, Pennsylvania in 1970

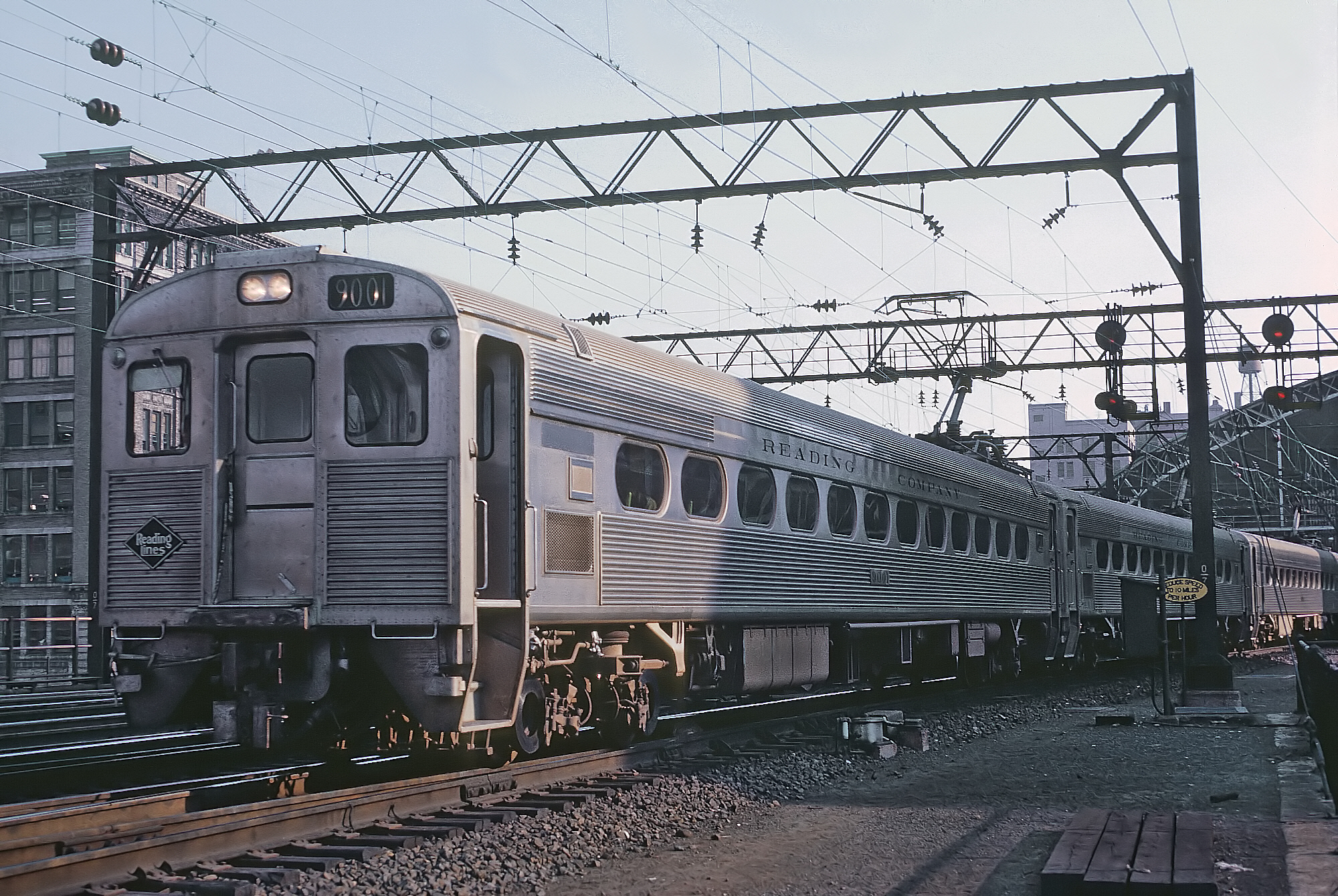
Reading Silverliner IIs departing the Reading Terminal in 1964

In 1963 the financial condition of the Pennsylvania and Reading Railroads was such that neither was able to upgrade their money-losing commuter operations on their own. As a result, state and local government stepped in to purchase new cars that would be in turn used by the private railroads to run the required commuter operations through an entity known as the Passenger Service Improvement Corporation. The new cars would be a production order based on 6 1958 Pioneer III type cars with improvements based on the lessons learned from the earlier design. A total of 38 cars were purchased for the PRR with the remaining 17 going to the Reading. While some referred to the new vehicles as "PSIC Cars", the modern stainless steel body shells quickly defined the fleet and the name "Silverliner" was soon adopted. In addition to their looks, the cars introduced many other modern innovations to the Philadelphia commuter rail network, including air conditioning, greater interior space (12 feet (3.66 m) longer than the PRR MP54) seating up to 127 persons, high acceleration with a greater top speed and near silent operation.

The 38 PRR cars were numbered in two series, 201-219 and 250-269 and given PRR classification MP85B and MP85C respectively, while the 17 Reading cars were numbered 9001-9017 and given Reading classification REB-13. With the delivery of the second set of "Silverliners" in 1967, the original Budd Silverliners were renamed "Silverliner II" with the Pioneer III cars becoming Silverliner I. In 1968 the Pennsylvania Railroad was merged into the new Penn Central and although funding for the commuter rail services were being provided by the newly formed SEPTA, from 1963 until the formation of Conrail in 1976, the Silverliners were operated by and wore the livery of their respective railroads, the PRR Keystone being replaced by the Penn Central "Worms" after the merger and the Reading diamond throughout. After 1976 the service continued to be operated under Conrail, but the cars were fully branded as SEPTA and would operate as such until the end of their careers.

In late 1984 the Center City Commuter Connection opened allowing the Reading and PRR cars to mix and roam about either "side" of the system. In 1989 the entire fleet was sent to the Morrison-Knudsen plant in Hornell, New York, for a mid-life overhaul. In addition to this all of the cars eventually received upgrades to their propulsion system to increase reliability and remove PCBs from their transformers, upgraded HVAC systems to eliminate CFCs. In the 1990s the cars received SEPTA's standard full length Red and Blue window decal wrapping and some of the cars had a minor interior upgrade with the original "ketchup and mustard" seats being converted to a padded brown leather appearance. By 2000 the cars' age was becoming apparent with decreasing reliability and lack of ADA compliance which included the manually operated doors which were becoming a hindrance at SEPTA's increasing number of stations equipped with high level platforms. However design delays and a contract bidding dispute delayed the order of their 120 replacement Silverliner V cars until past 2005 and then problems with the builder, Hyundai Rotem, setting up a production facility in South Philadelphia, further delayed deliveries until 2010. During this period an increasing number of Silverliner II cars began to be sidelined with serious mechanical problems with a few even catching fire in service. Due to the lack of a public address system the Silverliner IIs were operating under an ADA waiver set to expire on July 1, 2012, and with deliveries of Silverliner V cars accelerating SEPTA began to retire cars as their FRA 92-day inspections ran out. By May 2012 most Silverliner IIs had been retired and in their final week of service the last operating Silverliner II, #9010, was sent to run on the Cynwyd Line with the final run taking place on June 29.

== Design ==
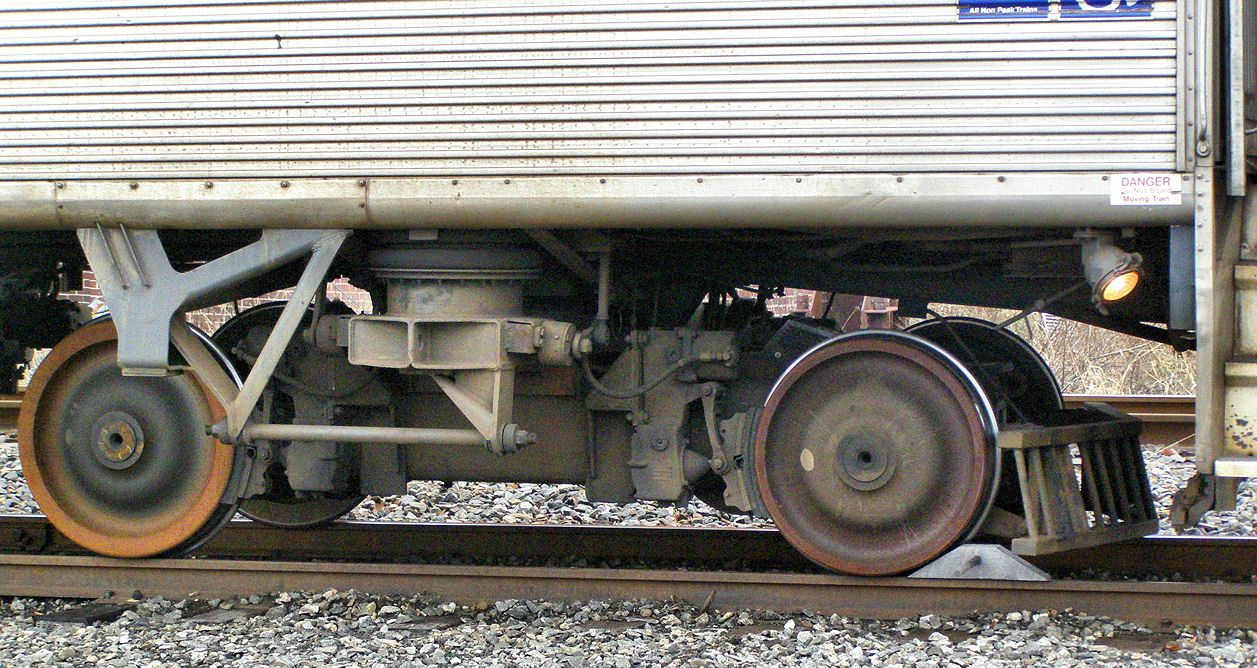
Side view of the Budd Pioneer III truck on Silverliner II No. 9009 showing the suspension elements and cowcatcher applied to the Reading cars.

The design of the Budd Silverliner was based on a lightweight stainless steel body and frame coupled to an advanced AC/DC rectifier propulsion system and new lightweight, high-speed trucks. While largely identical to the earlier Pioneer IIIs, differences included a single-arm Faiveley pantograph, a state-of-the-art propulsion system that made use of solid-state phase angle controllers coupled to mercury arc ignitron rectifiers, higher-powered motors, a higher-capacity main transformer, multi-function couplers and disc brakes. One result of these upgrades was that the Silverliners were incompatible with the six Pioneer prototypes. Passenger amenities were also identical to the Pioneer III cars offering riders air cushion suspension, air conditioning, electric train heat and a nearly silent acceleration and braking. With 150 hp (110 kW) more than the Pioneer III cars (550 hp or 410 kW total), the Silverliners could achieve a 1.7 mph/s (2.7 km/(h⋅s)) acceleration rate, which was far higher than the older MP54s and a top speed of 85–100 mph (137–161 km/h) compared with the 55–65 mph (89–105 km/h) of the MP54 fleet (which was not often reached in service). Inside, the cars were equipped with 25 rows of 3+2 reversible (flipover) bench seating with 124 usable seats and either a bathroom or an additional 3-person bench seat. The seats were initially furnished in a dark gray diamond-patterned foam rubber "plush", which began to wear out by the mid-1970s. Four cars (#259, #269, #9012 and #9015) were experimentally retrofitted with brown vinyl leatherette seats. However, the balance of the fleet was redone in the SEPTA/Conrail era with canvas-textured padded covering in a so-called "Ketchup and Mustard" theme, with the three-person seats upholstered in mustard yellow and the two-person seats done in a dark ketchup red.

Despite both Reading and PRR cars being paid for in part by the PSIC, each railroad was allowed to put their own stamp on the design. These differences included the PRR units being fitted with only one overhead luggage rack, a bar pilot, a metal-framed engineer's window and position-light cab signals, with the Reading cars being fitted with a cowcatcher, twin overhead luggage racks, and color light (though PRR-compatible) cab signals; the latter were removed after the RDG discontinued its 1928 cab signal installation on the Bethlehem Branch between Jenkintown and Lansdale in 1967, and 9001–9017 would have to be re-equipped with cab signal equipment in 1983–84 in preparation for operation through the Center City Commuter Connection and former PRR lines. The first group of PRR cars (201–219) were intended by be used on longer distance runs to places like Harrisburg, PA and New York City and were equipped with a bathroom on the "F" end to facilitate this. The second set of PRR cars, along with all of the Reading cars, were not equipped with comfort facilities, substituting a 3-person bench seat is its place. While all of the Silverliner cars were delivered with disc brakes, the PRR disliked this feature as it required trains to be placed over a drop pit for routine brake work, and all of their 38 cars were converted to conventional tread brakes by 1968. The Reading cars were not converted to tread braking until rebuilding in the SEPTA era in 1989. In addition to the disc brakes, all classes of Budd Silverliner were delivered with an early multi-function coupler design that consisted of an AAR "tightlock" knuckle coupler mounted above a separate automatic coupler for air and electrical connections. This design allowed the new MU cars to be attached (in emergencies or planned shop moves) for towing behind locomotives, conventional passenger and heavyweight MU cars, or in freight trains; the outer ends of the stepboxes were lettered with detailed instructions to train crews for doing so. However, the newer fleet of 232 Silverliner IVs were delivered with Budd's new "pin and cup" coupler and both the Silverliner II and III fleets were modified to both couple to and MU with the IVs, as opposed to the older cars the IVs were replacing. When this change was carried out the Penn Central fitted its cars with a welded bar pilot to protect the leading wheels from debris impact. All cars were equipped with WABCO AA2 horns.

== Notable cars and incidents ==
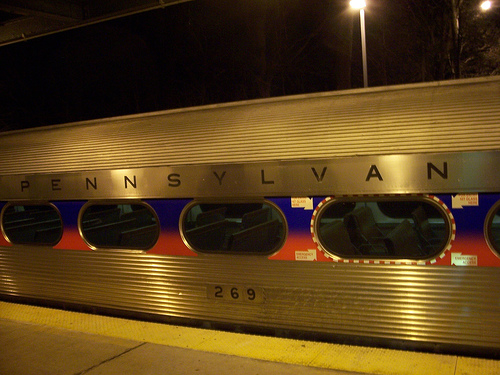
Silverliner II No. 269 still carrying "PENNSYLVANIA" name boards.

- No. 210 – Destroyed by electrical fire in Suburban Station in 1974.
- No. 218 – Had sheet metal cover partly removed from one of its letterboards revealing the 'LVANIA' portion of the original PENNSYLVANIA road name.
- No. 257 – Severely damaged by a heater fire while in service at Overbrook on November 4, 2009. Car remained stored outdoors at Overbrook Shops into mid-2010s as evidence in lawsuit stemming from fire; eventually scrapped.
- No. 265 – Retired after involvement in rear-end collision on the West Chester Branch on October 16, 1979.
- No. 266 – Converted to serve double duty as an overhead wire inspection "camera" car.
- No. 269 – Restored for the 25th anniversary of the Pennsylvania Railroad Technical & Historical Society and the 50th anniversary of the National Railway Historical Society to near-original PRR appearance with existing PENNSYLVANIA letterboards on both sides and re-applied PRR keystone decals on each cab end. Keystones were stolen shortly after the car went back into service.

== Experimental Silverliners ==
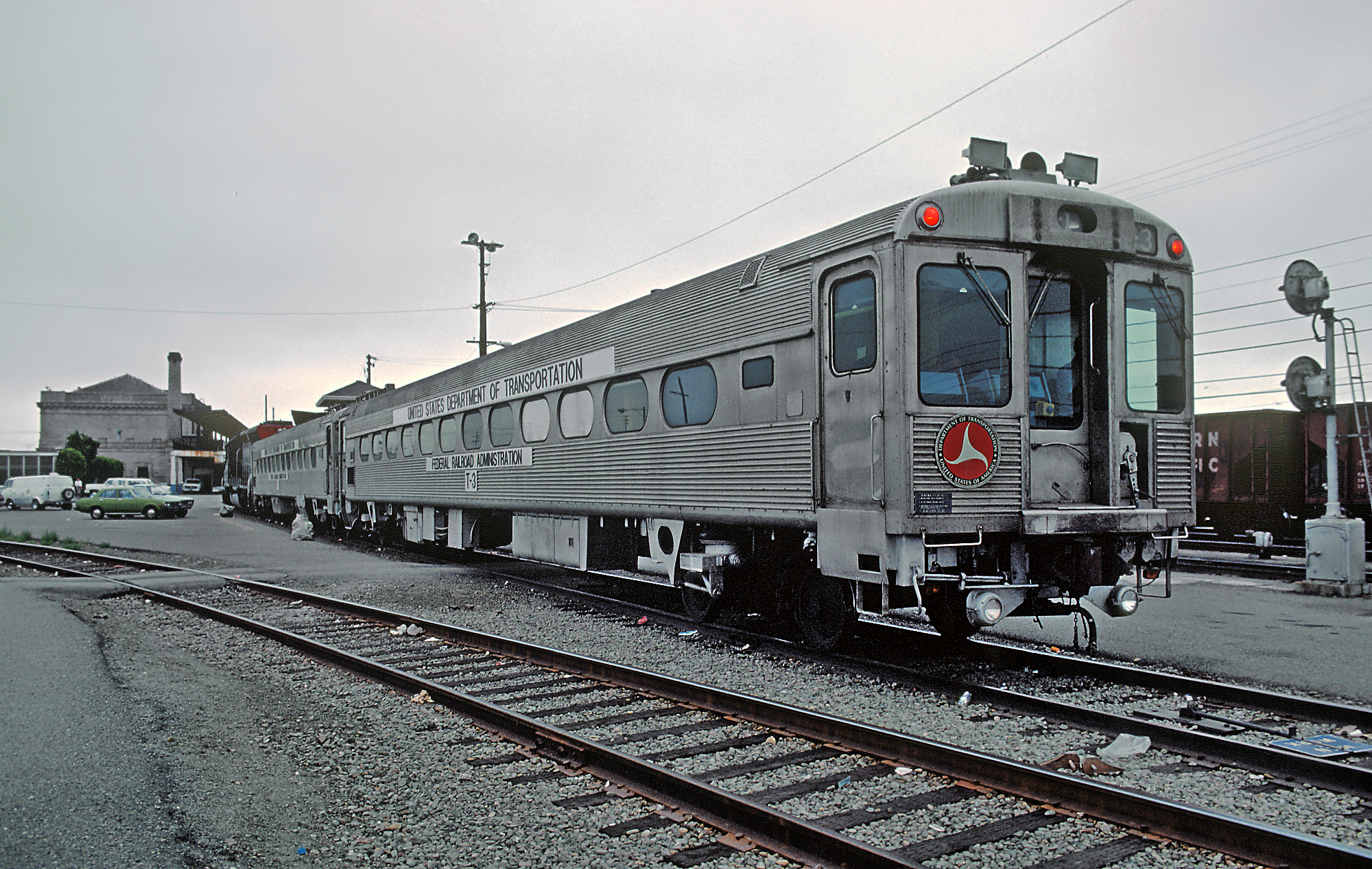
T-3 at 16th Street Station in Oakland, California in 1981

As part of the High Speed Ground Transportation Act of 1965 the United States Department of Transportation placed an order for 4 additional Silverliners for use as test vehicles to explore the feasibility of a high-speed rail line in the United States. Numbered T-1 through T-4, the cars were modified for operation up to speeds of 150 mph and were outfitted with various instrumentation to document the effects of rail travel at such speeds including CCTV cameras to monitor the wheels and pantograph. The most visible change was a slightly streamlined slab end applied to the T-1 car to reduce drag at high speed after the 4-car trainset was unable to reach the 150 mph (241 km/h) speed target with the stock end. With the new streamlining in place the train was able to reach a top speed of 156 mph (251 km/h) on the straight track between Trenton and New Brunswick, New Jersey. As a result, this same level of deflection was applied to the front ends of the production high-speed MU Budd Metroliners. During the tests the cars were based at the PRR's Morrisville Yard engine facility, and after the tests were completed at least one of the cars was de-powered and used as a USDOT rail testing vehicle for some years afterward, and one was used by the U.S. Army at Fort Eustis.

T-1 was purchased by a private buyer in 2015 and moved to the South Carolina Railway Museum, to be converted into a lounge car. T-2 exists as an office for the AAFES warehouse in Lee Hall, VA. T-3 and T-4 are presumed scrapped, but T-4 is unaccounted for. Its whereabouts are unknown.

== Preservation ==
• Ex-Reading Silverliner II #9001 survives in storage, and is due to go to the Reading Railroad Heritage Museum.

• Ex-Pennsylvania Silverliner III #238 was acquired by Northeast Rail Heritage, Inc., who plans to restore the car to its 1990s “Yellowbird” appearance.

== See also ==
- Budd Metroliner
- M1 (railcar)
- Silverliner
- SEPTA Regional Rail
