= Silverliner =

Series of electric multiple unit railcar

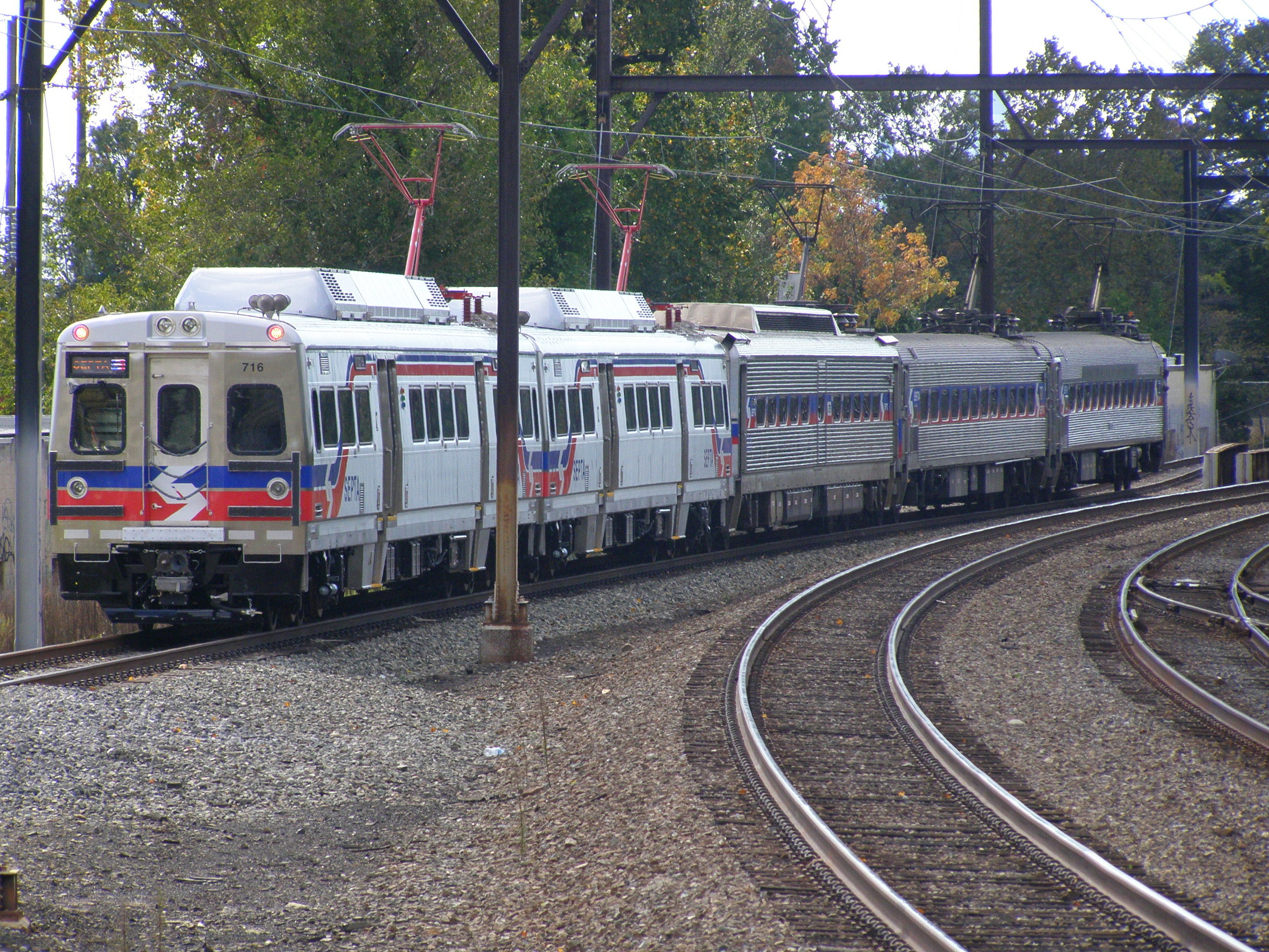
- A train with Silverliners II through V at Fern Rock
- In service: SL-I: 1958-1990; SL-II: 1963-2012; SL-III: 1967-2012; SL-IV: 1973-present; SL-V: 2009-present
- Manufacturers: SL-I/II: Budd Company; SL-III: St. Louis Car Company; SL-IV: Avco, General Electric; SL-V: Hyundai Rotem
- Number built: SL-I: 6; SL-II: 59; SL-III: 20; SL-IV: 232; SL-V: 120
- Formation: SL-I/II/III: Single unit; SL-IV/V: Married Pair and single unit
- Operators: Pennsylvania Railroad; Reading Railroad; Penn Central Railroad; Conrail (under SEPTA); SEPTA; US DOT; Denver RTD
- Line served: SEPTA Regional Rail

Specifications
- Car body construction: Stainless steel
- Car length: 85 ft
- Width: 10 feet (3.2 m)
- Doors: SL-I/II/III/IV 2 end doors w/ traps; SL-V: 3 Quarter point (2+1), two w/ traps
- Maximum speed: 100 mph (160 km/h)
- Traction system: SL-II/III/IV: Transformed alternating current fed initially through Ignitron and later Silicon-controlled rectifiers to phase angle DC motor controller.; SL-V: IGBT fed AC Drive.
- Electric systems: Catenary: 11-13.5 kV 25 Hz AC; 12 kV 60 Hz AC (SL-V only); 25 kV 60 Hz AC (SL-V only)
- Current collection: Pantograph
- Bogies: SL-I/II: Budd Pioneer; SL-II/IV/V: General Steel GSI 70
- Braking systems: Pneumatic, Dynamic (SL-IV/V only)
- Coupling system: WABCO Model N-2

Silverliner is the name given to a series of electric multiple unit (EMU) railcars in commuter rail service in the Philadelphia area since 1958. As of the introduction of the Silverliner V in 2009–2010, there have been 5 generations of Silverliner cars, identified by the Roman numerals I through V placed after the name Silverliner. The Silverliner name came from the classes' shiny stainless steel body shell, which contrasted with the painted and frequently rusting carbon steel railcars used by the Pennsylvania and Reading Railroads between 1915 and 1936. Applied to the first large production order in 1963, the cars made such an impression that the name has since been applied to all subsequent MU classes purchased by SEPTA for the Regional Rail services.

== Silverliner I ==
What came to be known as the Silverliner Is were a set of 6 pilot EMUs making use of Budd's prototype Pioneer III railcar design. The six Pioneer III cars were purchased in response to the increasing age of the PRR's MP54 fleet, some of which had been in service since 1915. While 100 of the MP54s had been rebuilt in 1950 with increased power and air conditioning, the old cars still suffered from a small passenger capacity, high weight and poor acceleration among other things. As other railroads adopted new technology MUs like the New York Central ACMU and New Haven 4400 series "Washboards" the PRR felt increasing pressure to update its fleet. In 1958 the PRR placed an order with the Philadelphia-based Budd Company for six Pioneer III MU cars in two subclasses to test out various options. Numbered 150 to 155 the even-numbered cars had fabricated truck frames and disc brakes, while the odd-numbered cars had cast steel truck frames and tread brakes. The PRR initially had hopes to MU cars such as the Pioneer IIIs in intercity service along its electrified routes and the cars were split between long distance and suburban duties. However, as testing went on they were soon limited to suburban service in the Philadelphia area when a full-scale production order of 38 PRR "Silverliner" cars were delivered in 1963.

The Pioneer III cars suffered from a low capacity main transformer as well as gearbox issues and a complex propulsion system that coupled highly sensitive mercury arc ignitron rectifier tubes with an inefficient DC resistance motor controller. Always distinguishable by their older style diamond pantograph, the Pioneer III cars were rechristened the Silverliner Is when the second official order of Silverliners were delivered from Saint Louis Car Company in 1967, the SL-Is would also be renumbered 244 to 248 when the Silverliner IV fleet was delivered in 1974–1975. The 6th car, which would have been #249, had already been written off in an accident by that time. While the other Silverliner models all came with similar GE propulsion gear, they could not MU with the earlier Silverliner I cars, which soon became the odd ducks in the SEPTA Regional Rail fleet. In the late 1980s SEPTA purchased a number of push-pull trainsets to provide enough peak period capacity to retire its remaining Reading Blueliners and the Silverliner Is by the timetable that took effect April 1, 1990. Until 2000, the cars were kept in storage near Wayne Junction. Although there were plans to convert the cars into locomotive-hauled coaches, SEPTA finally decided to dispose of the fleet due to the expense it would have taken to deal with PCBs in the transformers and the lack of ADA compliance. Of the 5 surviving cars, three were sent to the AAR/FRA test site in Pueblo, Colorado for use in crash tests, while the remaining 2 Pioneer III/Silverliner I cars, 246 and 247, were donated to the Railroad Museum of Pennsylvania in Strasburg, where they were ultimately scrapped in 2013.

== Silverliner II ==
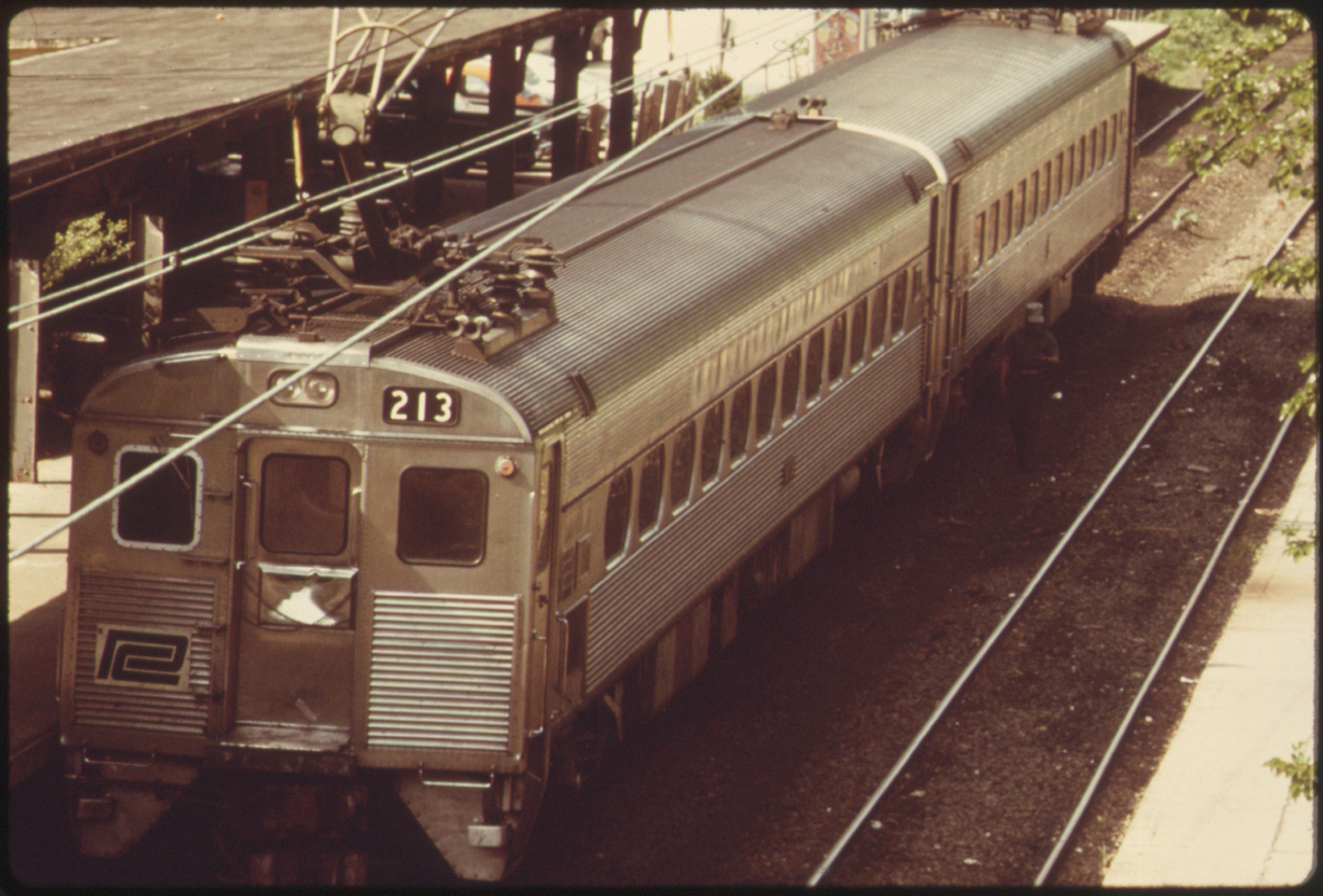
Penn Central operated Silverliner II coupled to a Silverliner III at Chestnut Hill West in 1974.

In 1963 the financial condition of the Pennsylvania and Reading Railroads was such that neither was able to upgrade their money losing commuter operations on their own. As a result, state and local government stepped in to purchase new cars that would be in turn used by the private railroads to run the required commuter operations through an entity known as the Passenger Service Improvement Corporation. The new cars would be a production order based on 6 1958 Pioneer III type cars with improvements based on the lessons learned from the earlier design. A total of 38 cars were purchased for the PRR with the remaining 17 going to the Reading. While some referred to the new vehicles as "PSIC Cars", the modern stainless steel body shells quickly defined the fleet and the name "Silverliner" was soon adopted.

Differences from the earlier Pioneer IIIs included a single arm Faiveley pantograph, a state of the art propulsion system that made use of solid state phase angle controllers coupled to mercury arc ignitron rectifiers and higher powered motors. Like the Pioneer IIIs before them, the Silverliners offered their riders air cushion suspension, air conditioning, electric train heat and a nearly silent ride. With 150 hp more than the Pioneer III cars (550 hp total) the Silverliners could achieve a 1.7 mph/s acceleration rate which was quite higher than the older MP54s and multi-function couplers and disc brakes further improved performance. The 38 PRR cars were numbered in two series, 201-219 and 251-269 and given PRR classification MP85B, while the 17 Reading cars were numbered 9001-9017 and given Reading classification REB-13. There were also minor differences between the two sets of vehicles with the PRR units being fitted with only one overhead luggage rack, a bar pilot, a metal framed engineer's window and cab signals, with the Reading cars being fitted with a cowcatcher and twin overhead luggage racks. The first set of PRR cars, #201-216, were also equipped with bathrooms in place of a 3-person bench seat in the 'F' end of the car to enable the cars use on longer runs to Harrisburg, Pennsylvania, or New York City.

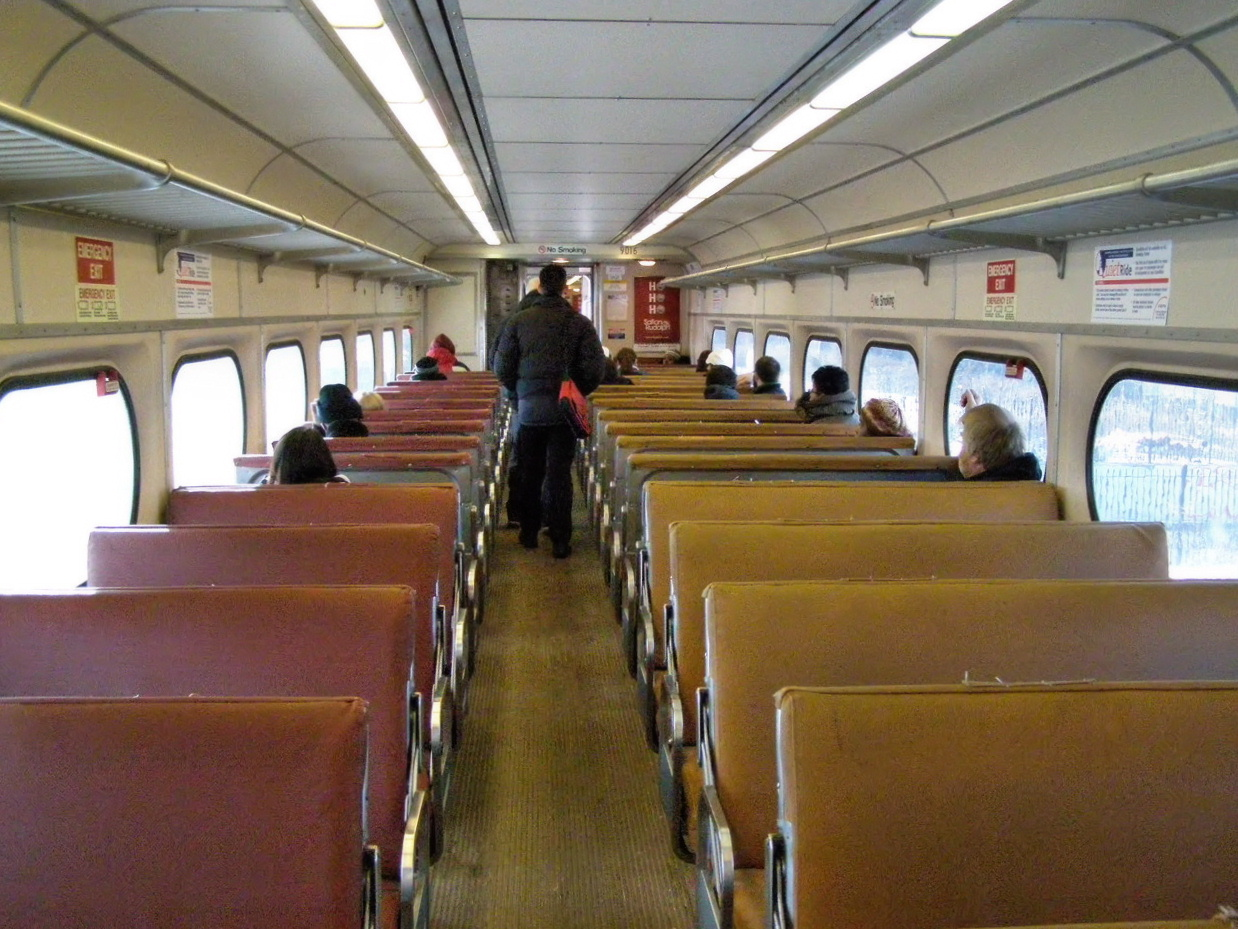
Interior of SL-II #9016 of the "Ketchup and Mustard" style that was fitted to most of the Silverliner II and III fleet.

With the delivery of the second set of "Silverliners" in 1967, the original Budd Silverliners were renamed "Silverliner II" with the Pioneer III cars becoming Silverliner I. Although funding for the service was being provided by the newly formed SEPTA, from 1963 until the formation of Conrail in 1976, the Silverliners were operated by and wore the livery of their respective railroads, the PRR Keystone being replaced by the Penn Central "Worms" in 1968. After 1976 the service continued to be operated under Conrail, but was fully branded as SEPTA and would operate as such until the end of their careers.

In 1989 the entire fleet was sent to the Morrison-Knudsen plant in Hornell, New York for a mid-life overhaul. At some point the old mercury arc rectifiers were replaced by the more reliable silicon controlled variety, the HVAC was updated with ozone safe refrigerant, the PCBs were removed in the transformer coolant and the bathrooms were closed in those cars that had them. By the year 2000 SEPTA began to plan for the retirement of the Budd Silverliners, which had not only reached the end of their design life, but their lack of dynamic brakes and manually worked doors were presenting growing operational headaches. However a prolonged procurement process as well as delays in delivering the replacement Silverliner V cars resulted in the Budds lasting in service well into 2012, a run of nearly 50 years. The final run took place on June 29, 2012, with former Reading car #9010 running with Silverliner III #235 on the Cynwyd Line.

=== Experimental Silverliners ===
As part of the High Speed Ground Transportation Act of 1965 the United States Department of Transportation placed an order for 4 additional Silverliners for use as test vehicles to explore the feasibility of a high-speed rail line in the United States. Numbered T-1 through T-4, the cars were modified for operation up to speeds of 150 mph and were outfitted with various instrumentation to document the effects of rail travel at such speeds. The most visible modification was a slightly streamlined slab end applied to the T-1 car to reduce drag during the high-speed runs. After the tests at least one of the cars was de-powered and used as a USDoT rail testing vehicle for some years afterward. The experimental Silverliners reached a maximum speed of 156 mph and were instrumental in the development of the Budd Metroliner.

T-1 was purchased by a private buyer in 2015 and moved to the South Carolina Railway Museum, to be converted into a lounge car. T-2 exists as an office for the AAFES warehouse in Lee Hall, VA. T-3 and T-4 are presumed scrapped, but T-4 is unaccounted for. Its whereabouts are unknown.

== Silverliner III ==
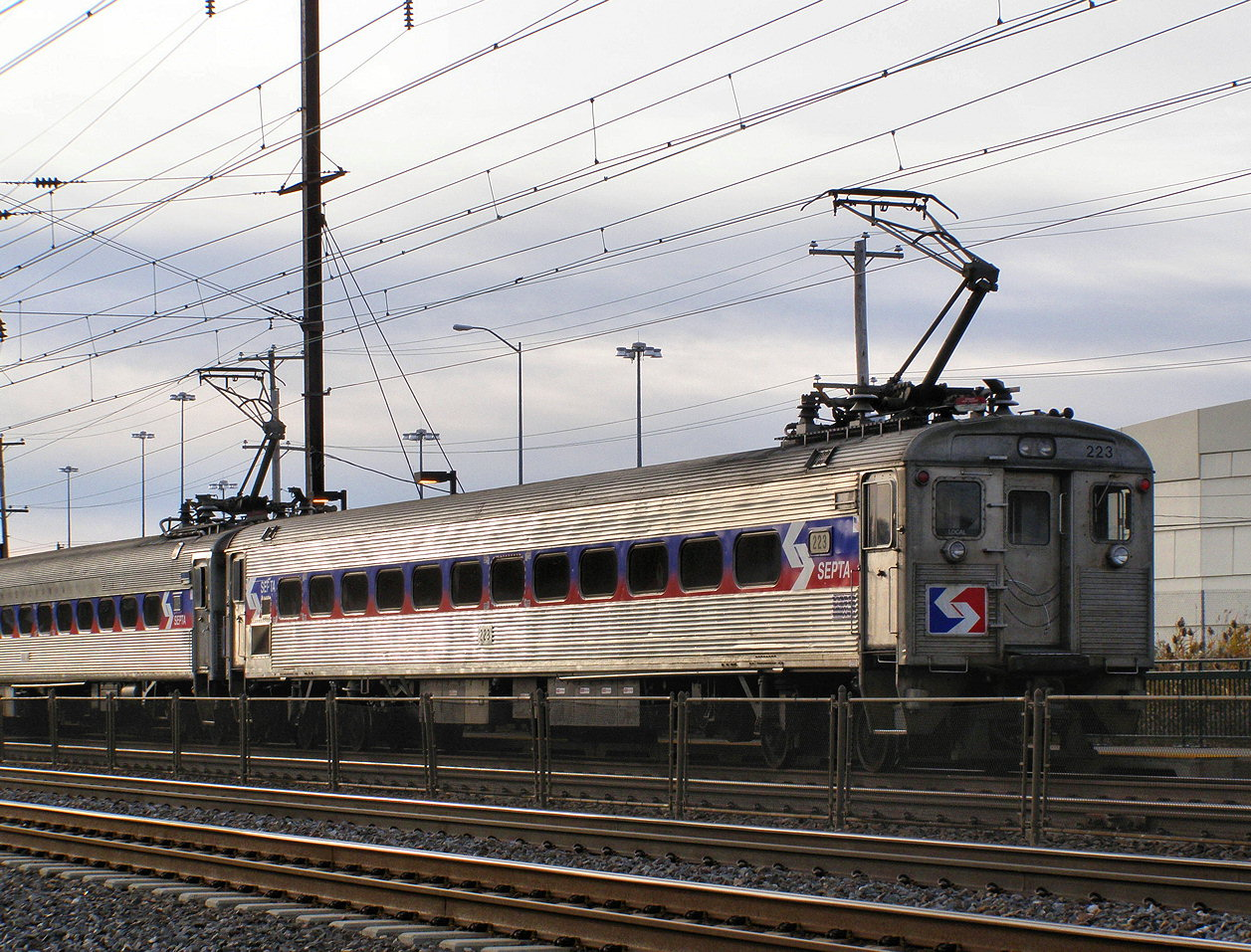
SEPTA Silverliner III #223 making a stop at Cornwells Heights Station.

In late 1967 SEPTA received an order of 20 additional stainless steel MU railcars from the St. Louis Car Company for use on its Pennsylvania Railroad operated suburban lines, soon to be a part of the merged Penn Central railroad. The cars were built on a similar propulsion platform and with many of the same specifications as the Silverliner IIs including a nearly identical interior and the ability to run in multiple with the IIs. One major difference was the placement of the engineer's control station on the left hand side of each vestibule which was to support single unit operations where the normal position of the engineer would block one of the two available entryways. The placement would also allow for one person train operation, although this was never actually carried out. Other differences included carbody sides without traditional railroad letterboards, wider stainless steel fluting, fiberglass cladding on portions of the car ends, full-length overhead luggage racks on both sides of the cars, and rectangular interior door windows in place of round portal windows seen on the Budds. Since a letterboard was omitted, railroad identification on the car sides was provided by PRR keystone decals (later covered by Penn Central decals) at each end of the window band.

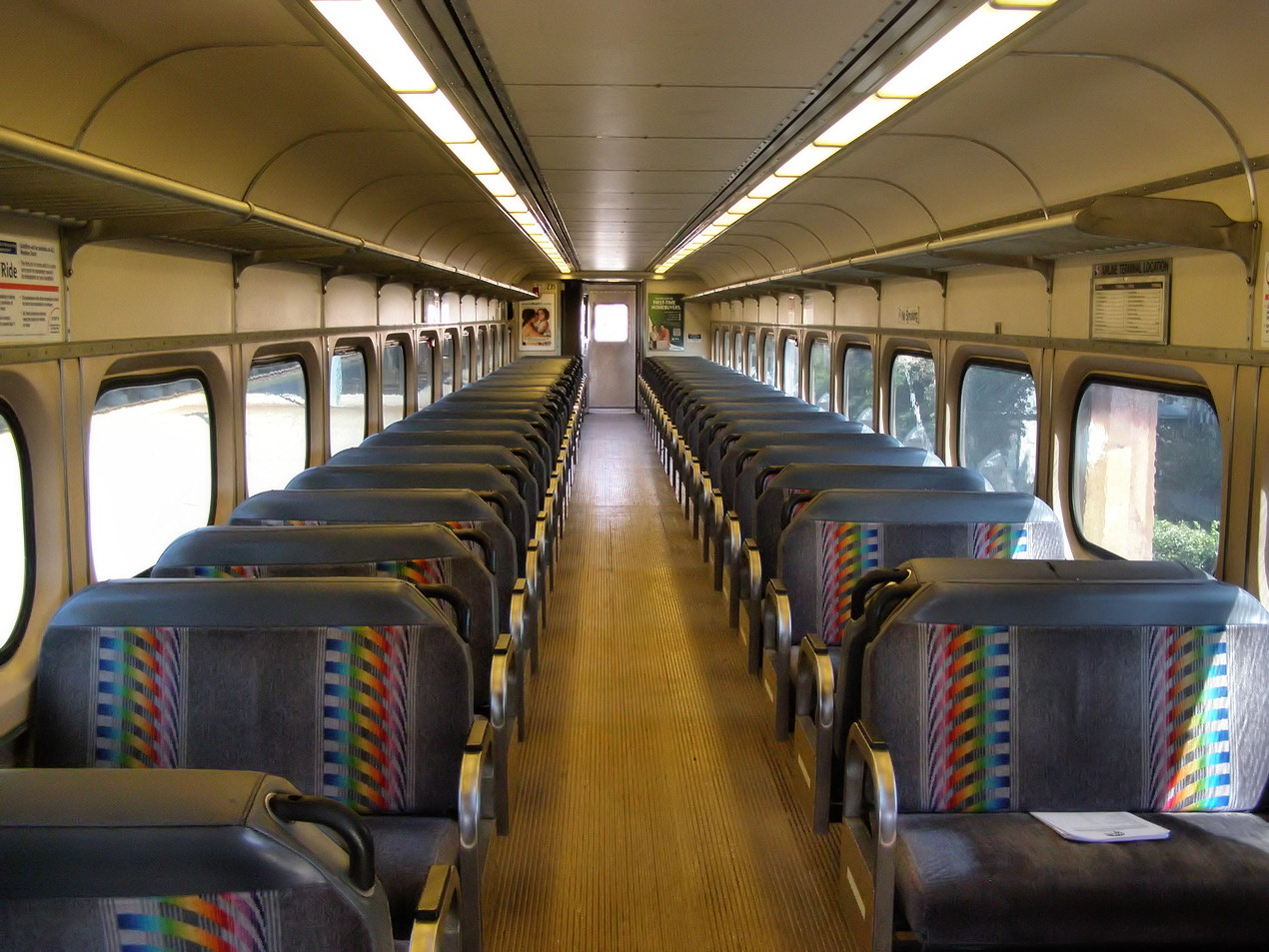
SEPTA Silverliner III #235 showing the customized interior for Airport service.

Numbered 220 through 239, for their first eight years the Silverliner IIIs worked trains running into Suburban Station. In addition to suburban duties the Silverliner IIIs were used on longer distance runs to Harrisburg, Pennsylvania, replacing PRR MP54E5 and E6 cars. This was branded as "Silverliner Service" in 1970s Amtrak timetables, and was operated by Conrail along with the rest of the state-supported SEPTA routes. In 1984/85 eight of the cars, numbers 232 through 239, were converted into a dedicated fleet for the SEPTA Airport Line. The Airport IIIs were wrapped in a bright yellow band (the color of the Airport Line on SEPTA signs and timetables at the time), and emblazoned with the logo of the Philadelphia International Airport on the fronts. Inside, larger luggage racks were provided along with a wider central aisle made possible by the use of plush 2+2 seating instead of the standard 3+2. The Airport IIIs were used in this service for a few years before being dispersed for general service to give SEPTA more flexibility in routing trains between routes. In the early 1990s the Silverliner III fleet was rebuilt by Morrison-Knudsen in a similar fashion to the Silverliner IIs.

While able to run in multiple with the later IVs, SEPTA preferred to run the IIIs either as solid sets or in conjunction with the IIs, the latter being more common due to that classes' larger size. By the late 2000s the Silverliner IIIs began to find themselves in the same position as the Silverliner IIs with increasingly unreliable components and leaking roofs. Starting in 2011 with the first deliveries of the new Silverliner Vs, those IIIs not already sidelined by mechanical issues began to be retired, a process completed by June 2012. The final run of a Silverliner III took place on June 29, 2012, with former Airport car #235 running with Silverliner II #9010 on the Cynwyd Line. Silverliner III #238, the last survivor of its class, has been preserved by Northeast Rail Heritage as of early 2026 after being stored at Sullivan's Scrap Metals since 2023.

== Silverliner IV ==
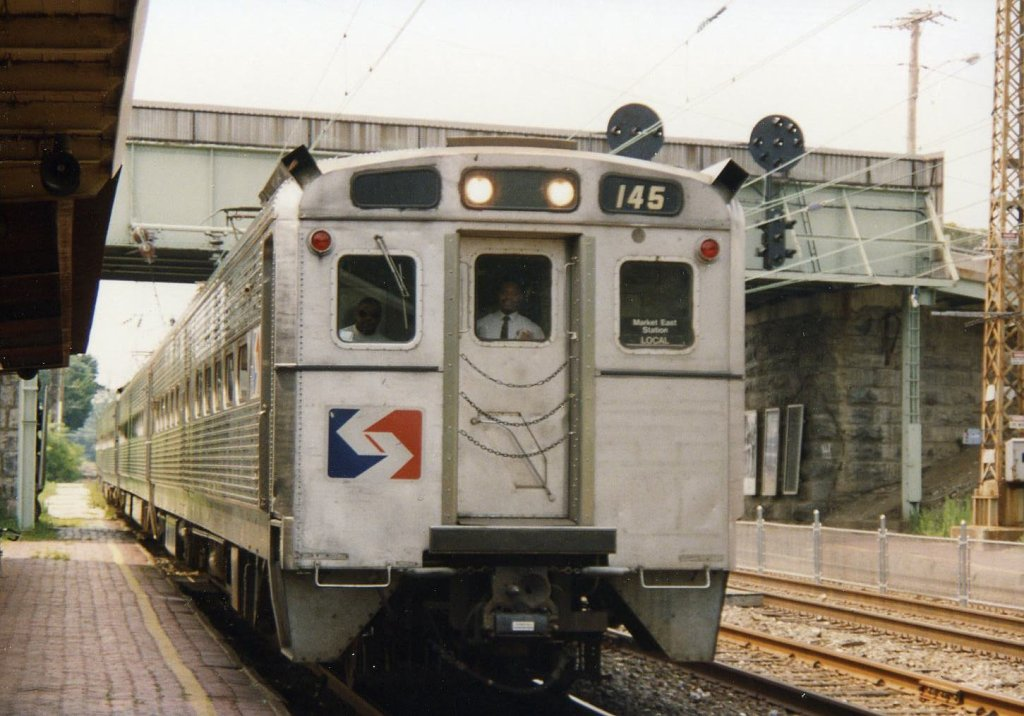
SEPTA Silverliner IV #145 making a stop at the Paoli Station, in 1993.

The 232-car Silverliner IV order was the largest order in the Silverliner series to date. Delivered between 1973 and 1976, the Silverliner IV cars allowed for the retirement of most of the Reading electric multiple units and PRR MP54 cars, which dated from at least the 1930s. Three times as numerous as the previous Silverliner trains put together, the Silverliner IV has been SEPTA's most common passenger railcar since 1976. Like the Silverliner II and III cars, the IV cars were owned by SEPTA and provided to the private railroads for use in their state-supported commuter rail operations until SEPTA assumed direct operation in 1983.

=== Features ===
The cars were ordered from General Electric and Avco. Aside from the boxier look and smaller side windows, the main changes between the new IVs and earlier Silverliners included a dynamic brake system, for which the resistance grids were fitted in the car's signature roof hump, and, for the Penn Central cars, a trainline automatic door system which removed the need for train crew to manually open doors at high level platforms. The Silverliner IVs were also the first to be delivered in a married pair configuration, although a minority of cars were outfitted as single units. The delivery of the Silverliner IVs allowed SEPTA to replace most of its remaining round front windowed pre-war PRR MP54s and Reading's MU car fleet save for the 38 rebuilt "Blueliner" cars. Although being fitted with an updated propulsion system from General Electric, the Silverliner IVs were nevertheless still delivered with Ignitron tube rectifiers (necessary to convert the overhead (catenary) wire high voltage AC to DC required to operate the traction motors) which were later replaced with silicon controlled rectifiers.

A readily apparent external feature of the Silverliner IV is a windowed body panel plug in the middle of the cars on each side, a provision for high-platform-only center doors which have never been installed, in contrast with New Jersey Transit's similar, contemporary Arrow II and III cars which were built with such operating center doors. Internally, pairs of seats occupy this partitioned area which was intended for passenger flow.

=== Delivery ===
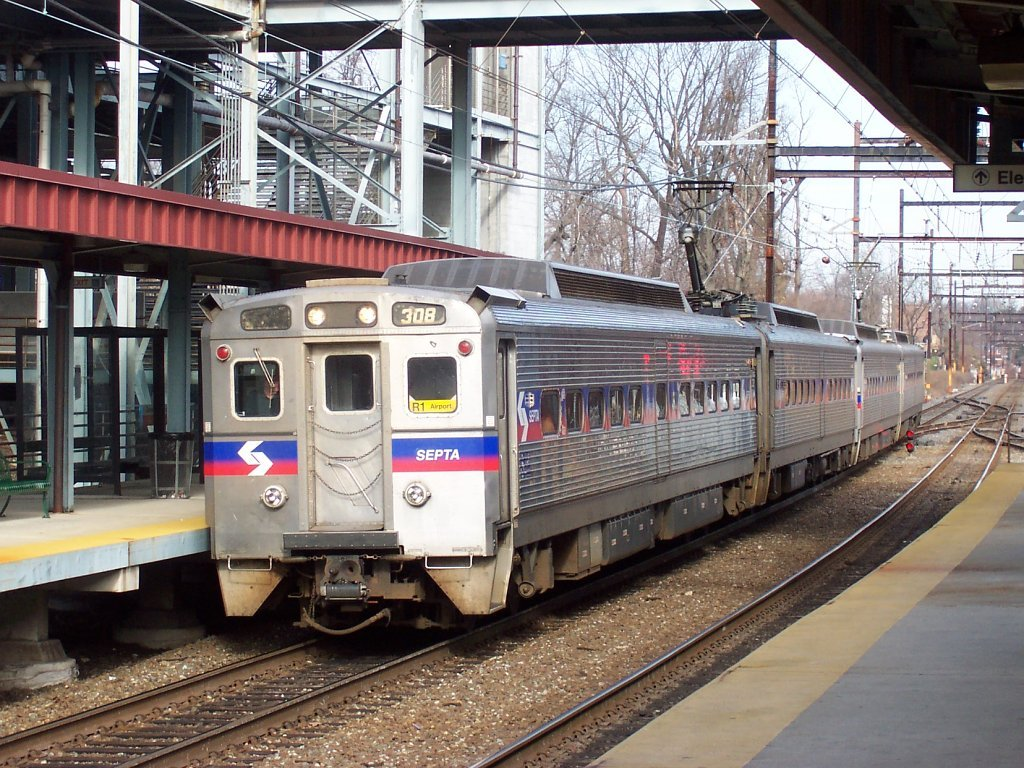
SEPTA Silverliner IV at Fern Rock Transportation Center

The Reading got the first batch of Silverliner IVs in the form of 14 single unit cars produced during 1973. The first two (#9018 and #9019) were unveiled to the press on Thursday, February 21, 1974. These were numbered in series with their existing Silverliner IIs, 9018 through 9031. In 1974-75 the Penn Central took delivery of 34 single units numbered 270 through 303. Delivery of the Silverliner IVs was briefly interrupted by the production of 70 Arrow II cars for the New Jersey Department of Transportation before the Penn Central received 96 pairs numbered 304 through 399. Finally in 1976 the Reading took delivery of a final batch of 88 pairs numbered 101 through 188. All the IVs were delivered with the circular SEPTA logo on the left, and the Penn Central or Reading logo on the right, of all car sides and ends, although the Reading black diamond logo was omitted (and the space left blank) on cars 129-188 which were delivered after the Reading Company was absorbed into Conrail on April 1, 1976. These logos remained mostly intact until 1983, when SEPTA took over commuter rail operations from Conrail and quickly began applying its current rectangular logo over all the others.

=== Modifications ===
The Silverliner IVs have never been officially rebuilt, but there have been a number of modifications to the class. The propulsion system was initially upgraded from the original mercury arc–based Ignitron rectifiers to more reliable solid state silicon controlled rectifiers and later the main transformers had their coolant replaced with one that did not contain PCBs. As this change was carried out in the early 1990s, all of the 9000 series Reading cars and some of the Penn Central cars were renumbered into the series 400 through 460 to help keep track of which units had undergone the modification. When the Center City Commuter Connection opened in 1984, the Reading cars were converted to full train automatic door operation to take advantage of the high level platforms at the new Market East Station (now Jefferson Station) and others on the former PRR "side" of the system. In the late 1990s the fleet received its most noticeable upgrade with the original "ketchup and mustard" colored interior replaced with a softer gray motif as well as softer seating. Around 2004 SEPTA began to replace the cowcatcher pilots equipped on the original Reading cars with a bar type pilot to match those on the PRR cars. Starting in 2009 SEPTA began to replace the original Faiveley pantographs with more modern Schunk type units.

=== Service history ===
The Silverliner IV fleet has provided service on all of SEPTA's Regional Rail routes, providing the backbone of SEPTA's service plan with older equipment tending to be used on peak services only. Most SEPTA trains consist of a single pair of Silverliner IVs, with longer trains made up as needed. The single units are most frequently coupled to pairs to make 5 or 3 car trainsets, although single units are run alone on Cynwyd Line service. Only one car, #9020, has been retired as of 2015 after a severe rear-end collision in the vicinity of the North Wales station in 1980, which damaged the car beyond repair. On August 29, 2018, car #144 was heavily damaged by an electrical fire at Glenside station. On February 7, 2025, a SEPTA commuter train made up of Silverliner IVs, carrying 350 people on board caught fire in Ridley Park, Delaware County, Pennsylvania.

== Silverliner V ==
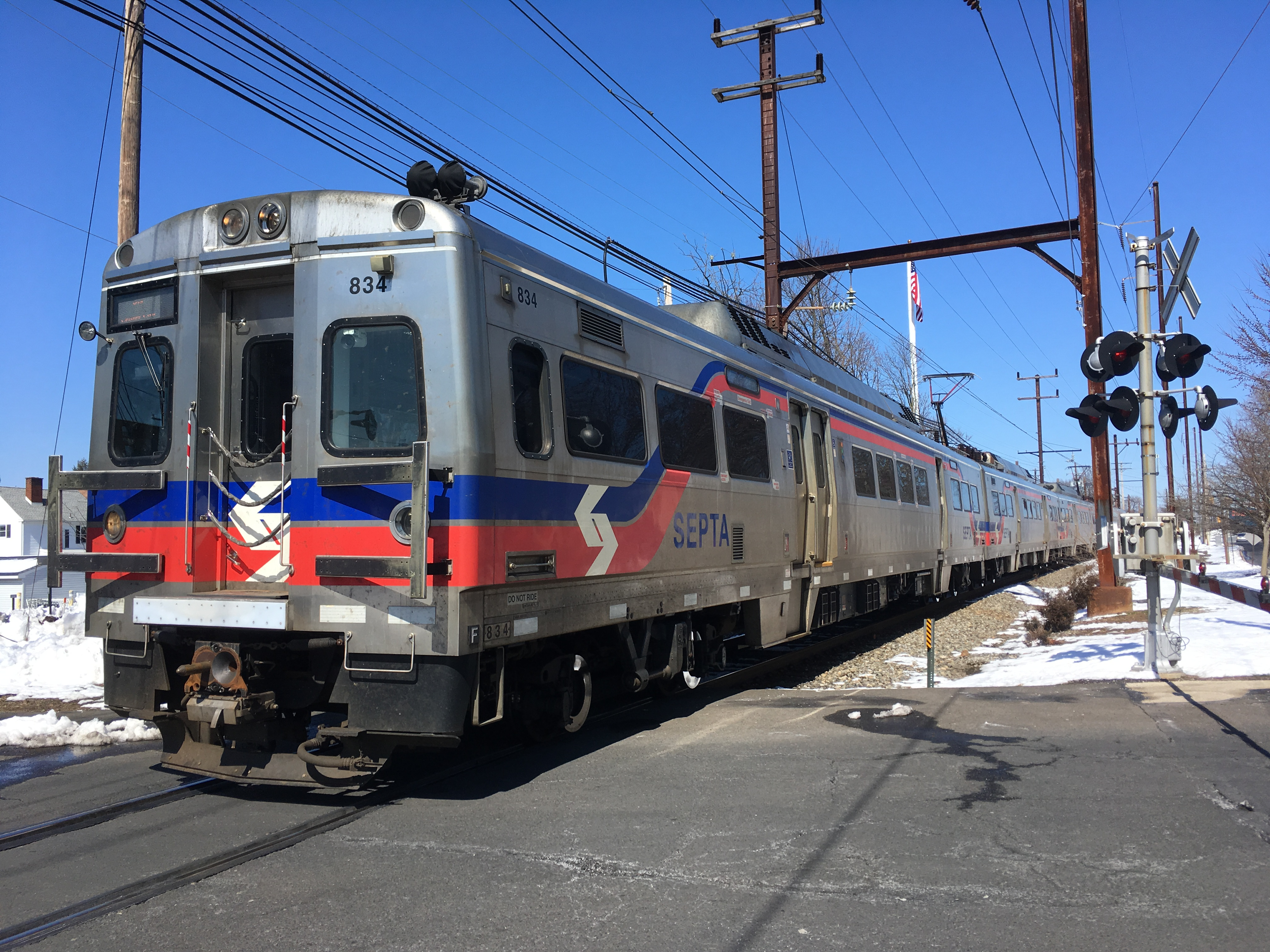
SEPTA Silverliner V on the Warminster Line approaching Hatboro station.

A total of 120 new Silverliner V cars were built by Hyundai Rotem of South Korea, with the first three entering service on October 29, 2010. The cost for all 120 cars was $274 million, and they were constructed in Hyundai Rotem facilities located in South Philadelphia and South Korea. The last of these cars was received by SEPTA in March 2013, three years behind schedule due to a variety of production problems, resulting in contractually specified delay penalties against the manufacturer totaling over $20 million.

Resembling a "stretched" Market-Frankford Line M-4 car or the M8 cars used by the Metro-North Railroad, the Silverliner V cars have three doors on each side: one each a quarter length from each end of the cars for boarding and alighting at stations with either high or low-level platforms, and an additional door adjacent to one of the quarter-point doors used at high-level platforms for faster arrivals and departures at the major Center City zone stations (University City, 30th Street, Suburban/Penn Center, Jefferson, and Temple University). They also feature wider aisles and seats, and dedicated areas for wheelchairs and power scooters. In place of the glass-reinforced plastic placards denoting the train route, the train route and destination are displayed on new colored LED panels on both the front and sides of the train, and improved PA systems allows the automated system to announce station names. The new trains feature enhanced security, with CCTV cameras that are able to broadcast over a proprietary wireless network to the Command Center at SEPTA's headquarters. There are three basic Silverliner V car types: 38 single cars, numbered 701–738, and the 82 single-cab "A" and "B" cars which make up the 41 two-car married pairs, numbered 801–882.

All of SEPTA's Silverliner V cars were taken out of service due to fatigue cracks in the trucks on July 1–2, 2016. This caused widespread disruption of SEPTA's Regional Rail Lines. As of October 5, 2016, the Silverliner V's have returned to normal service and SEPTA continued to reinstate every Silverline V car by November.

== Silverliner VI ==
In 2017, SEPTA announced that, along with procurement of the new ACS-64s, SEPTA would look into long-term financing options for a future Silverliner VI. In a December 2018 New Jersey Transit board meeting agenda, procurement of 113 EMUs from Bombardier Transportation based on the Bombardier MultiLevel Coach was discussed. Included in the board meeting agenda was an option for SEPTA to purchase an additional 250 EMUs from the order. These cars will have USB charging capabilities, and be equipped with the same media displays that adorn the Silverliner Vs. The VIs will be the replacement for GE's older Silverliner IVs running since the 1970s. In November 2023, SEPTA put out an expression of interest for contractors to build the Silverliner VI cars. They will be single level EMUs, either in married pairs, triplets, or quadruplets.

== Summary ==
Built	Manufacturer	Model	Numbers	Total Built	Rebuilt	Weight (Ton/t)	Seats	Remarks
1958	Budd	Pioneer III / Silverliner I	PRR: 150–155; PC 294–298; PC/SEPTA: 244-248 from 1974	6	N/A	85,000 lbs	127	#155 destroyed in accident prior to 1973. Lightest railroad MUs built in North America.
1963–1964	Budd	Silverliner II	PRR: 201–219, 251–269; Reading: 9001–9017; USDoT: T1-T4	59	1989	101,400 lbs	124–127	#210 destroyed in fire in the 1970s, #257 destroyed in fire on November 4, 2009, #265 retired after rear-end collision Angora PA October 16, 1979. 269 carried PENNSYLVANIA name on letter boards until retirement. Unit 9001 preserved at Reading Railroad Heritage Museum
1967–1968	St. Louis Car	Silverliner III	220-239	20	Early 1990s	105,504 lbs	122 (Airport cars: 90)	Originally used on what is now the Keystone Service with left-side cabs; 232–239 formerly dedicated cars for the R1 Airport Line. 238 preserved by Northeast Rail Heritage Inc.
1973–76	GE/Avco	Silverliner IV	Original: 101–188 (Reading Pairs), 274-303 (PC singles), 304-399 (PC pairs), 9018-9031 (Reading singles); Current: 101–188, 306–399, 417–460 (married pairs); 276–305, 400–416 (single cars)	232	Late 1990s interior refresh	120,600 lbs	125	400-series units are cars renumbered from lower series or from Reading Railroad cars 9018–9031 when PCB transformers were replaced. Original PC car series #276 through #399 is no longer continuous. Car #9020 was destroyed in rear-end collision at North Wales July 17, 1980. Car #144 heavily damaged by fire at Glenside August 29, 2018. All were temporarily withdrawn in Fall 2025 for overhaul following a string of fires from February 2025 to September 2025.
2010–13	Rotem	Silverliner V	701–738 (single cars); 801–882 (married pairs)	120	N/A	125,000 lbs	110	Replacements for 68 Silverliner II/III cars with remainder to add capacity. Placed in service between fall 2010 and spring 2013. All units temporarily withdrawn due to cracks on the components in 2016. However they returned to service in November 2016.
