= Delaware and Ulster Railroad =

Heritage railroad in New York, US

Overview
- Headquarters: Arkville, New York
- Locale: Delaware County, New York
- Dates of operation: 1983–present

Technical
- Track gauge: 4 ft 8 1/2 in (1,435 mm) standard gauge

The Delaware and Ulster Railroad (DURR) is a heritage railroad based in Arkville, New York.

== History ==
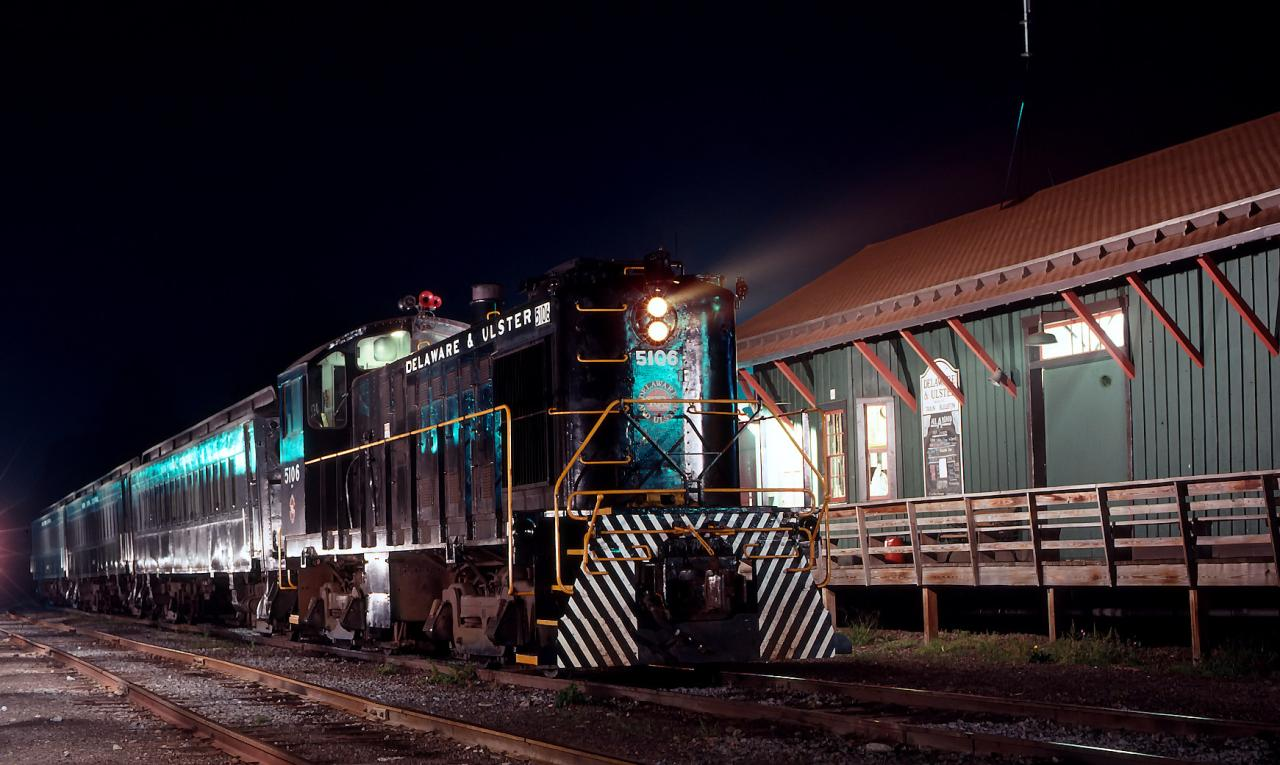
Delaware and Ulster train, circa 1989

The last regularly scheduled passenger train over the former Ulster and Delaware Railroad (U&D) tracks was operated between Kingston and Oneonta by the New York Central Railroad on March 31, 1954. The tracks were then cut back to Bloomville in July 1965 to make way for construction of Interstate 88 near Oneonta, and for lack of freight business west of Bloomville. Ownership of the tracks passed to Penn Central in 1968, and to the government-backed Conrail on April 1, 1976. The last westbound freight train over the mountains was operated by Conrail on September 26, 1976, with the return trip to gather up all remaining freight cars taking place on October 2, 1976.

The DURR is a subsidiary of the not-for-profit Catskill Revitalization Corporation, of Stamford, NY, which owns 45 miles (72 km) of the former U&D railbed between Highmount and Bloomville. The line was acquired from Penn Central in 1980, for $770,000, following the successful regional advocacy for this by transportation attorney Donald L. Pevsner. Funding was provided by the A. Lindsay and Olive B. O'Connor Foundation, of Hobart, NY, which currently has $57 million in assets derived from IBM stock that was sold to Mr. O'Connor directly by Thomas Watson, Sr., IBM's former CEO, in the 1920s. The Foundation conveyed the line to the Delaware County Towns through which it passed, and these towns later conveyed it to the non-profit Catskill Revitalization Corporation. The new tourist railroad started operations in 1983, between Highmount and Arkville and extended operations later to the Arkville–Roxbury segment.

The DURR operates in Delaware County on the former U&D tracks west of Highmount, where the tracks are defunct eastward to a point just east of West Hurley. DURR's operations were limited to the Arkville-Roxbury segment during early years of tourist operations. The Highmount-Arkville segment was placed back into service on October 3, 2013, and the Roxbury-Hubbell Corners segment remains out of service.

The Hubbell Corners-Bloomville segment was abandoned; the railbed was converted for use as the Catskill Scenic Rail Trail.

The DURR suffered a major washout at Kelly's Corners on August 28, 2011, as a result of Hurricane Irene. The east branch of the Delaware River undermined approximately a quarter mile of track along Route 30 and caused minor washouts and scouring at Halcottsville and other locations along the line; service resumed in May 2012.

After the 2019 operating season concluded, the 2020 operating season came to a halt due to the COVID-19 pandemic. Despite restrictions eventually easing up by early 2022, track conditions prevented the railroad from reopening. In April 2025, the railroad announced that track work was progressing and that they planned to resume operations for the public later that year. Passenger excursion rides resumed in September 2025 with the return of fall foliage trips, operating East out of Arkville toward Fleischmanns.

== Rip Van Winkle Flyer ==
The pride of the DURR is the Rip Van Winkle Flyer, a five-car Budd streamline train used for charters. The train consists of:

- Observation Car: former NYC #61, built 1948
- Tavern Lounge: former Minneapolis & St. Louis #52, built 1948
- Dining Car: former ACL #5936, built 1950
- Vista Dome: former MP #891, built 1948
- Baggage/Generator, former ATSF

The regular train is powered by former Delaware & Hudson 5017, an ALCo RS-36 built in January 1963, and consists of two flatcars and three former Pennsylvania Railroad MP54 coaches (441, 444 and 447) lettered for NYC.

Other locomotives at the DURR consist of:

- ALCo S-4 #1012: formerly Ford Motor Company #1012, built December 1954
- ALCo S-4 #5106, formerly Chesapeake and Ohio #5106, built August 1953
- GE 44 tonner #76, formerly Western Maryland #76, built August 1943
- EMD NW2 #116, formerly New York, Ontario and Western #116, built June 1948

Currently under fundraising for restoration is the "Red Heifer," a Model 250 Brill Gas-Electric doodlebug, formerly Canada and Gulf Terminal M-405 built in 1928, and later became NYC M-405. This piece of equipment was used extensively during the railroad's early days in 1983.

The railway also owns two flatcars.

The DURR's Roxbury station is owned by the Ulster & Delaware Railroad Historical Society and is called the Roxbury Depot Museum. Currently, the entire depot is covered by a structure that was put in place while it was used as a lumber and feed dealer. Volunteers are seeking funds for full restoration, as well as seeking to settle remaining issues with the estate of the former owner before work can proceed.

== Management ==
The DURR is owned by the Catskill Revitalization Corporation.

- G.V. Stevens, Chief Mechanical Officer and Operations Manager
- Ted Latta, Track Supervisor
- Ken Dodge, Jr., Signal Maintainer
