= Pioneer III =

Electric multiple unit

PRR MP85 / Silverliner I
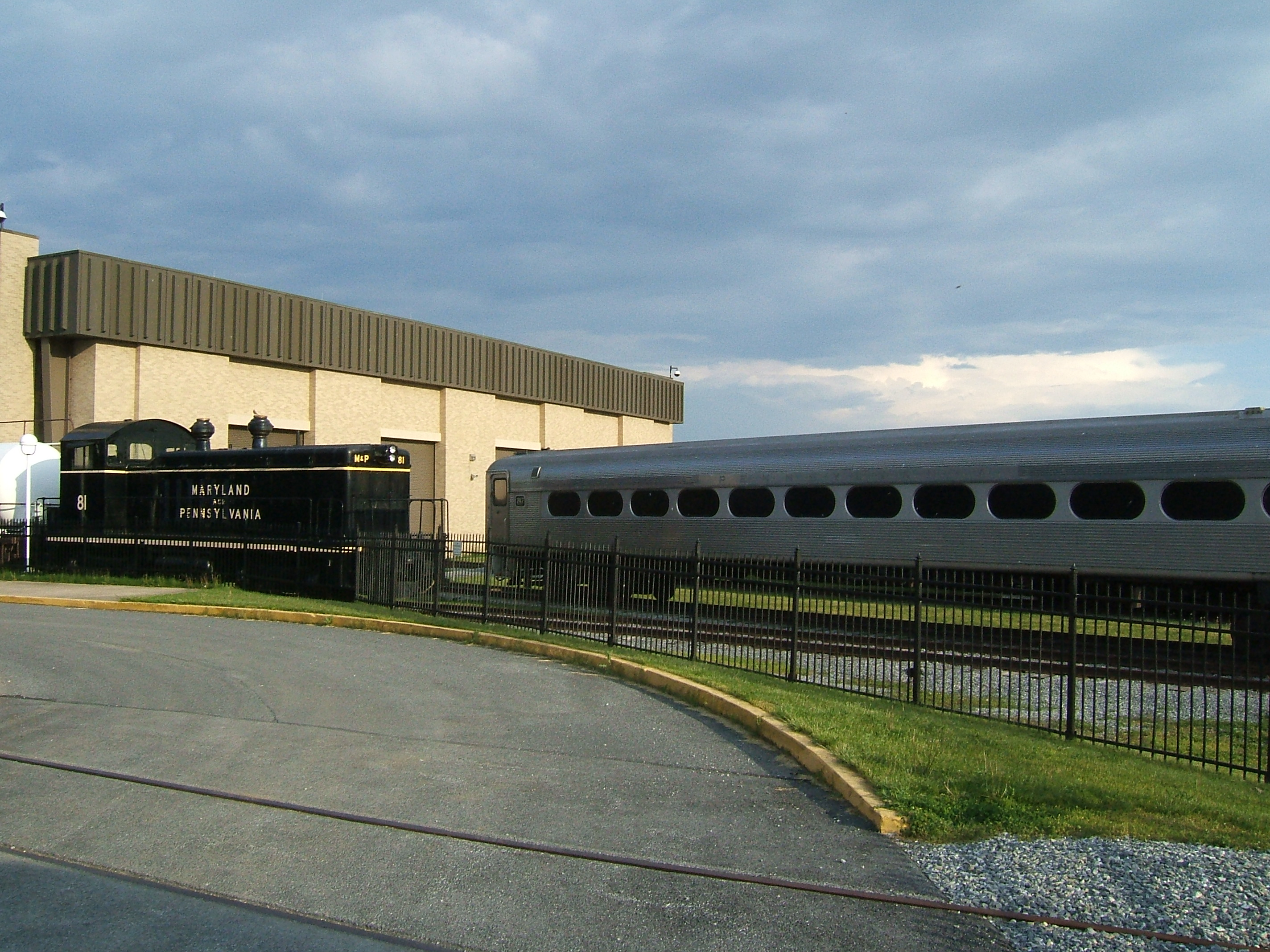
- A Pioneer III car was formerly preserved at the Railroad Museum of Pennsylvania.
- Stock type: Electric multiple unit
- In service: 1958–1990
- Manufacturer: Budd Company
- Built at: Red Lion Plant, Philadelphia
- Family name: Pioneer III
- Number built: 6
- Number preserved: 0
- Number scrapped: 6
- Successor: Budd Silverliner II/St Louis Car Company Silverliner III
- Formation: Single unit
- Fleet numbers: PRR 150–155; PC / SEPTA 244–248
- Owner: Pennsylvania Railroad Amtrak SEPTA
- Operators: Pennsylvania Railroad; Penn Central Railroad; Conrail; SEPTA

Specifications
- Car length: 85 ft (25.91 m)
- Width: 9 ft 11 1/2 in (3.04 m)
- Maximum speed: 85 mph (137 km/h)
- Weight: 90,000 pounds (41,000 kg)
- Traction system: Line current transformed to 1580V and fed through 4 Westinghouse WL653B Ignitron rectifiers to a DC resistance motor controller. 2 cars converted to silicon rectifier in 1961.
- Power output: 400 hp (300 kW) (4 x 100 hp (75 kW) )
- Electric system: 12,000 V 25 Hz AC catenary
- Current collection: Pantograph
- Bogies: Budd Pioneer
- Braking system: Pneumatic
- Track gauge: Standard gauge

The Pioneer III railcar was a short/medium-distance coach designed and built by the Budd Company in 1956 with an emphasis on weight savings. A single prototype was built, but declines in rail passenger traffic resulted in a lack of orders so Budd re-designed the concept as an electric multiple unit (EMU). Six of the EMU coach design were purchased by the Pennsylvania Railroad with the intention of using them as a high-speed self-contained coach that could be used for long-distance commuter or short-distance intercity travel in the Northeast U.S. The 6 production Pioneer III units were the first all-stainless-steel-bodied EMU railcar built in North America and, at 90,000 pounds (41,000 kg), the lightest.

== Lightweight coach ==
The Pioneer III lightweight coach (Budd serial number 3880) was completed in 1956 and was seen by the Budd Company as a milestone product that could revolutionize the passenger railcar market. With this assessment in mind, the Pioneer III name was chosen in reference to the Budd Pioneer stainless steel aircraft and the Pioneer Zephyr lightweight trainset. The coach was designed for medium- or short-distance inter-city passenger travel with extreme emphasis placed on saving weight. This was accomplished through the use of electric train heat and air conditioning in place of steam and mechanical systems, high-speed inboard bearing trucks that used air suspension instead of heavier springs, an airline-style bathroom instead of the fully equipped "lounge" style and a thin corrugated stainless steel carbody. The result was a car that weighed only 53,000 pounds (24 t), nearly half the amount of the then state-of-the-art "lightweight" stainless steel cars being manufactured by Budd. With a capacity of 88 passengers in a 2+2 seating configuration, the Pioneer III coach achieved a 600 pounds (270 kg) weight-to-passenger ratio, a number not seen since the days when passenger cars had been made out of wood. Unfortunately, these remarkable statistics were accomplished at the expense of comfort, as passengers were provided with significantly reduced legroom compared to other coaches in the same class and a bouncier ride.

The Pioneer III coach concept toured numerous North American railroads as a demonstrator unit, but due to the general decline in rail passenger traffic there was little interest in new rolling stock, especially one that represented a new and untested model.

== Electric Multiple Unit ==
Budd Pioneer III lightweight truck. Note non-standard right-angle gearbox.

Finding no takers for the Pioneer III coach, Budd re-worked the design into an Electric Multiple Unit for commuter operations by fitting a propulsion system and a vestibule type operating cab at each end. The Pennsylvania Railroad's increasingly antiquated fleet of MP54 suburban MU's prompted the railroad to order 6 Pioneer III MU's from Budd in 1958. Measuring roughly 85 feet (25.91 m) in length and 10 feet (3.05 m) in width, the Pioneer III coach resembled the stainless steel coaches used by the Pennsylvania Railroad for its premier New York City-Washington, D.C., and New York City-Chicago services. Seating on the Pioneer III was in two rows of 25 in a 3+2 configuration. Like all MU coaches, the Pioneer III was capable of running as a single-car train or with up to six cars total, depending on the number of passengers it was to carry. The Pioneer III car had an advertised speed of 100 mph (161 km/h), but in actual operations ran at speeds of around 80–85 mph (129–137 km/h) Its knuckle-shaped (tightlock) couplers, identical to those found on the PRR long-distance trains, allowed the Pioneer III coaches to be transported to shop facilities in Paoli or Wilmington for maintenance. The original numbers were 150-155 with the even-numbered cars having fabricated truck frames and disc brakes, while the odd-numbered cars had cast steel truck frames and tread brakes.

The cars used the revolutionary, and aptly named, Budd Pioneer III truck, which was a lightweight, inboard bearing railroad bogie designed for high-speed operation. This truck would see continued use by Budd on its subsequent Silverliner order, as well as MUs ordered by the Long Island Rail Road and Metro North, PATCO rapid transit cars and the Amtrak Amfleet cars, where they would operate up to speeds of 125 miles per hour (201 km/h). The Pioneer III cars used a slightly different right-angle gearbox (adapted from the very successful Budd-built PTC M-3 transit cars) set the traction motors at a right angle to the axle instead of the more common lateral placement. The need for a larger traction motor resulted in the change to the more traditional layout in the Silverliner II design.

Power was collected from a diamond-shaped pantograph, and the control system consisted of a step-down transformer connected to an AC/DC rectifier powered by mercury arc ignitron tubes. The DC output was then fed into a camshaft motor controller which provided for smooth acceleration. No dynamic braking system was fitted. In 1961 the mercury arc tubes were replaced by silicon diode rectifiers.

The thin stainless steel carbody and other elements of the Pioneer III design combined with the lightness of the traction components resulted in the Pioneer III MU cars being the lightest all-metal electric multiple unit railroad passenger cars produced in North America. Unfortunately there were reliability and performance issues with the small traction motors and low capacity main transformer.

=== Service history ===
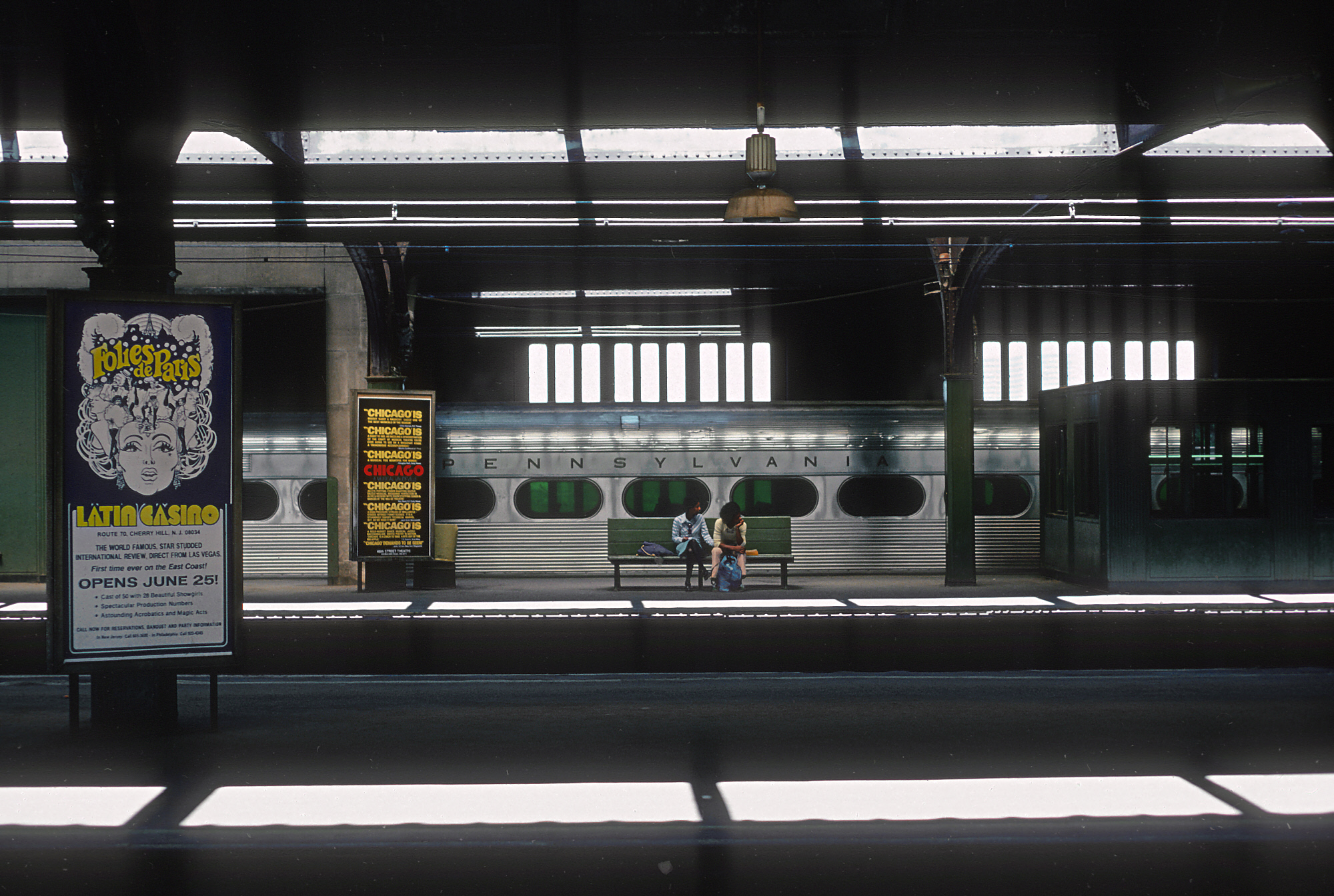
A Pioneer III car at 30th Street Station in 1976

Although the Pioneer III design was advanced for its time, operating headaches and a ready stream of available GG1 locomotive-hauled coaches spelled a premature end to the Pioneer III coaches in long-distance passenger service. In 1963, as part of an effort to improve commuter rail service in the Philadelphia area, the PRR contracted with the Budd Company to build a more advanced version of the Pioneer III design. Using the Pioneer III as a model, the new "Silverliner", as the stainless steel MU coaches were called, differed greatly from the Pioneers. They all had fabricated trucks with air springs and disc brakes, more powerful traction motors, two rows of ceiling lights, improved air-conditioning, the use of an automatic MU coupler that automatically made electrical connections in addition to the usual AAR "knuckle" design and a sleeker T-shaped (Faiveley) pantograph in place of the diamond-shaped pantograph. 38 Silverliner cars (201–219, 251–269) were built for the PRR, with 17 nearly identical cars (9001–9017) for the Reading Company tacked onto the same order.

After taking delivery of the 38 Silverliner cars, the PRR took the Pioneer III cars off intercity operations and used them exclusively on Philadelphia-area commuter service. In 1967, when SEPTA and the PRR took delivery of a second "Silverliner" MU car order from the St. Louis Car Company, the first (1963) "Silverliner" delivery became the "Silverliner II" cars and the 1967 order, the "Silverliner III." Although still officially called the Pioneer III, these cars were retroactively given the "Silverliner I" designation. As part of the Penn Central merger, the cars were also renumbered, out of sequence, to 294–299. By that time, the three disc-braked cars, together with all of the PRR Silverliner IIs, had been retrofitted with tread brakes, with which the Silverliner IIIs came equipped.

During the 1974–75 delivery of the "Silverliner IV" cars from General Electric numbered PC 270–303, the Pioneers were renumbered 244–248 (the 249 had been wrecked and retired by that time) to form a solid block of MU's containing both the new cars and existing Silverliner II and III cars. After purchasing a number of push-pull trainsets and AEM7s in 1987, SEPTA found itself possessing a sufficient number of Silverliner II, III and IV MU cars to retire the Pioneer III/Silverliner I cars. Retirement finally came with the spring timetable change on April 1, 1990, due to a requirement by Amtrak that all locomotives and self-propelled railcars operating on the Northeast Corridor be equipped with a new type of train control, a result of a 1987 train collision. Until 2000, the cars were kept in storage near Wayne Junction. Although there were plans to convert the cars into locomotive-hauled coaches, SEPTA finally decided to dispose of the fleet due to the expense it would have taken to deal with PCBs in the transformers and the lack of ADA compliance. Of the 5 remaining Pioneer III/Silverliner I cars, three of the cars were sent to the AAR/FRA test site in Pueblo, Colorado, for use in crash tests, while the remaining two cars were donated to the Railroad Museum of Pennsylvania in Strasburg.

The two cars at the Railroad Museum of Pennsylvania were ultimately scrapped in 2013.

== Gas turbine demonstrator ==
In 1966 the Budd Company in cooperation with Garrett AiResearch used the surplus Pioneer III demonstration coach as the basis for the first gas turbine-powered railcar in North America. The coach, re-christened GT-1, was to be supplied to the Long Island Rail Road for testing on its non-electrified branch lines as a way to provide high speed MU operation without the need to extend the electrification. The single entry vestibule was converted into a vestibule cab, with a second, doorless cab being constructed on the "blind" end of the coach. The GT-1 used a mechanical drive, with the output shaft of the gas turbine being connected to the driving wheels via a mechanical gearbox. The GT-1 was tested on the LIRR from September, 1966 to May, 1967.

In 1969 the GT-1 was rebuilt using funds from the Urban Mass Transit Administration into a hybrid turbo-electric railcar, replacing the mechanical drive with an electrical generator providing power to 4, 150 hp traction motors. Re-classified again as GT-2, the coach was intended to test gas turbine railcar operation into the confines of New York Pennsylvania Station and therefore was also given the capability to draw power from the 700 VDC third rail. The GT-2 was also notable for being one of the first rail vehicles to be equipped with DC chopper propulsion control. The Pioneer III coach in the GT-2 configuration was tested from November, 1969 to December, 1970.

== See also ==
- Budd Silverliner
- Silverliner
- ACMU
