= Pennsylvania Railroad Technical and Historical Society =

The Pennsylvania Railroad Technical and Historical Society (PRRTHS) is a railroad historical society founded in 1974 and organized as a Pennsylvania non-profit corporation and recognized as a 501(c)(3) tax-exempt organization by the United States Internal Revenue Service. The Society defines its mission as bringing together those interested in the Pennsylvania Railroad and its predecessors and subsidiaries for the purpose of preserving and recording all information available about them. The society is recognized as the source for PRR information by railroad periodicals such as RailModel Journal, RailPace and Model Railroader.

== Publications ==
The PRRTHS has published a quarterly illustrated journal, The Keystone, since 1968. The journal contains researched articles on topics related to the PRR, as well as reader questions and answers, news items of PRR interest, and reviews of PRR-related publications.
