= PRR MP54 =

Electric-Multiple unit class

MP54
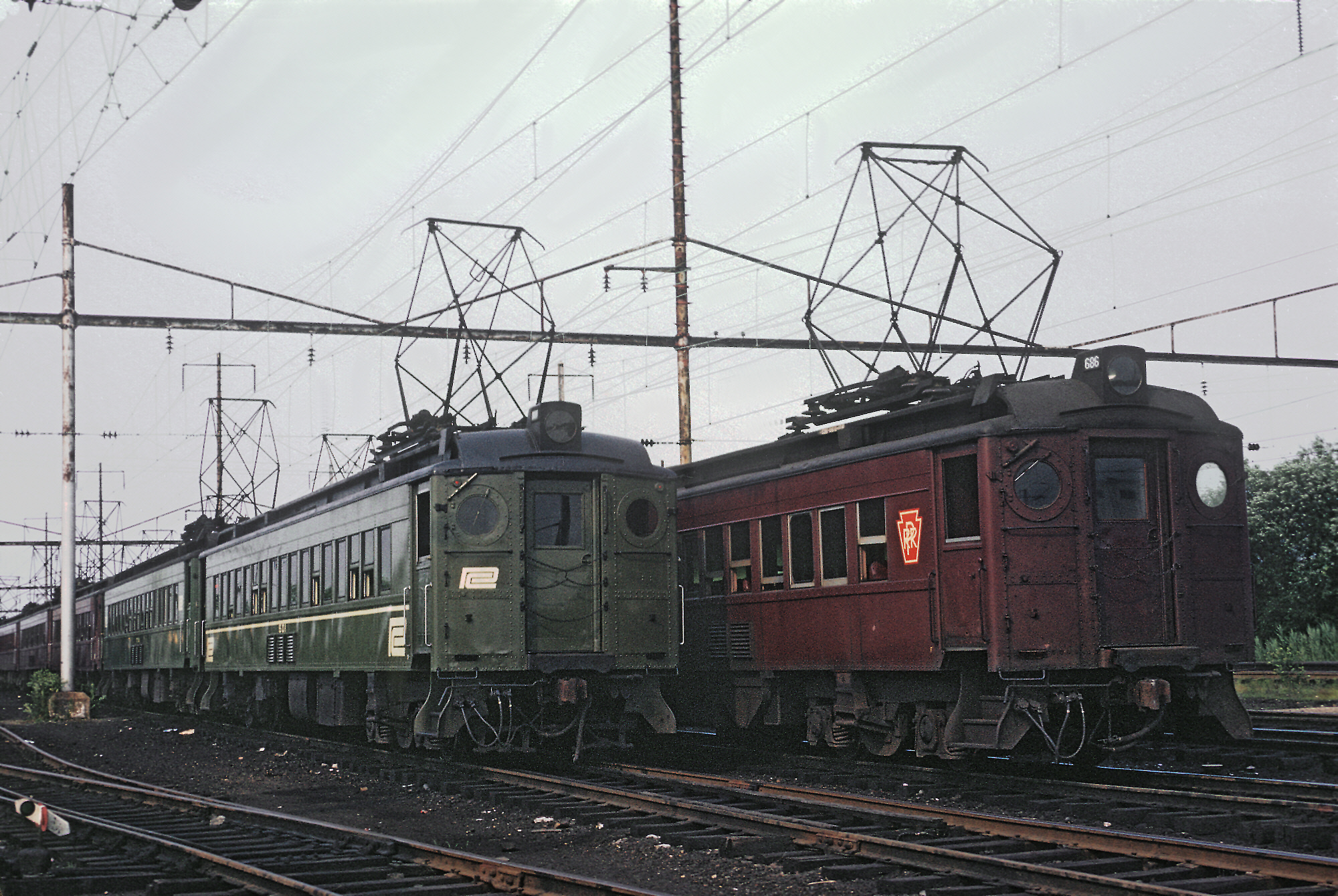
- Two MP54 trailers, one in the Pennsylvania Railroad livery and the other in the Penn Central livery in Delaware, June 1969

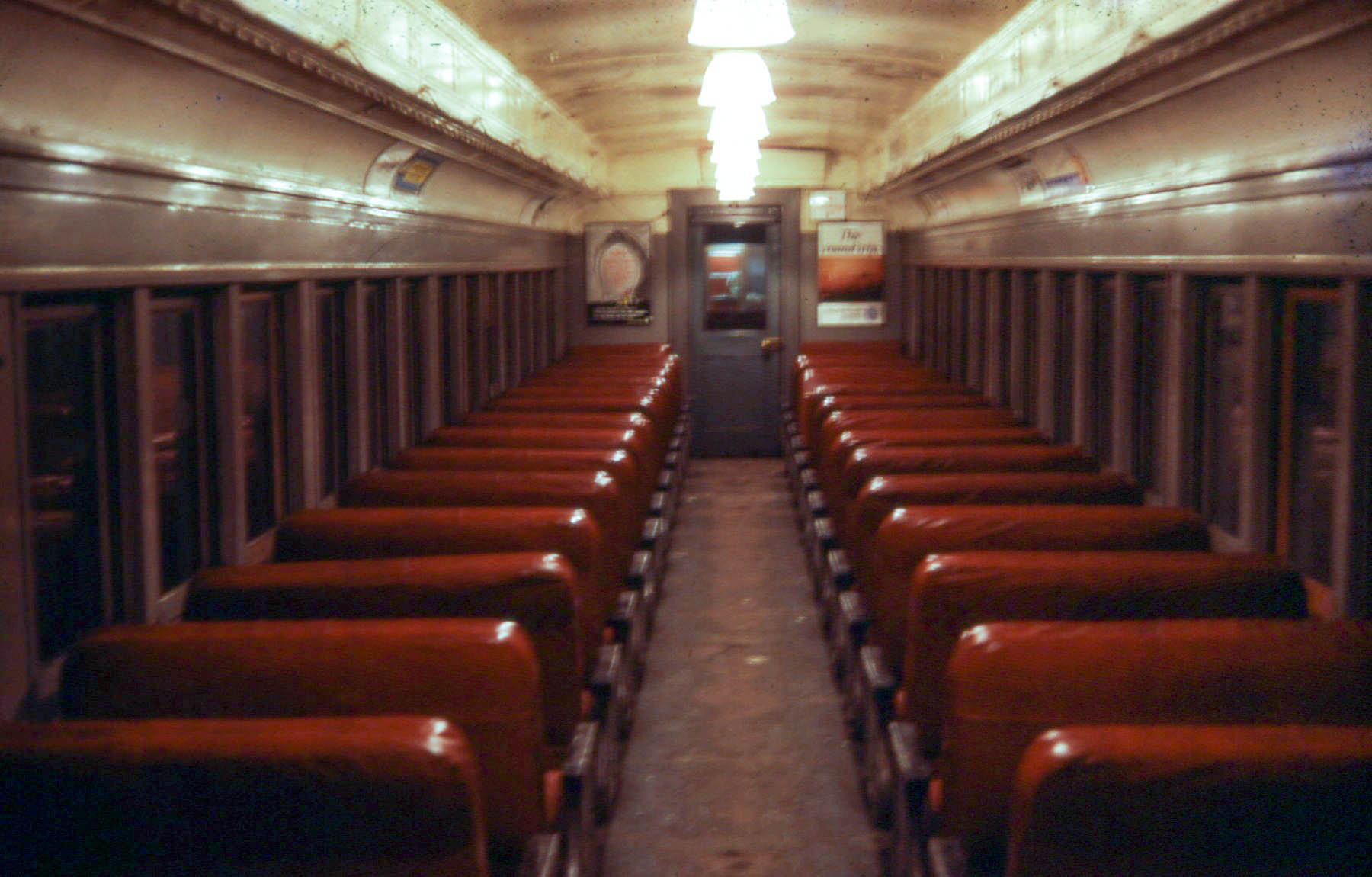
- The interior of an MP54 car in 1967
- Manufacturers: Pennsylvania Railroad, American Car and Foundry Company, Pressed Steel Car Company, Standard Steel Car Company
- Family name: P54
- Constructed: 1908–1937
- Entered service: 1908–1972 (LIRR); 1915–1981 (PRR)
- Refurbished: PRR: 1950
- Scrapped: 1958–1981
- Number built: PRR 487; LIRR 923; PRSL 18
- Formation: Single car, 41 "bride and groom" (motor-trailer)
- Fleet numbers: MP54E1 497-499, 504-617, 4546-4551, 4553-4557, 5296-5297, 5969-5970; MP54E2 618-819, 4561, 4567, 5287-5292, 5298; MP54E3 459-496, 4568-4575; MP54T 1-43, 5416-5419; MP54E6 409-458
- Operators: Pennsylvania Railroad; Long Island Rail Road; Pennsylvania-Reading Seashore Lines; Penn Central Railroad; Conrail; New Jersey Department of Transportation; SEPTA

Specifications
- Car body construction: carbon steel
- Car length: 64 ft 5 3/4 in (19.653 m)
- Width: 9 ft 11 1/2 in (3.035 m)
- Height: To roof: 13 ft 0 in (3.96 m); To headlight: 13 ft 9 1/4 in (4.197 m); To collapsed pantograph: 15 ft 0 in (4.57 m)
- Floor height: 4 ft 0 in (1.22 m)
- Doors: 2, end vestibule
- Maximum speed: 65 miles per hour (105 km/h)
- Traction system: 2 × WH 412-A/D 200 hp (150 kW); MP54E1/E2; 2 × GE 616 200 hp (150 kW); MP54E2; 2 × WH 426-A 370 hp (280 kW); MP54E3; 2 × GE A-626 370 hp (280 kW); MP54E3; 2 × WH 431-A 225 hp (168 kW); MP54E5; 4 × GE A-630 125 hp (93 kW); MP54E6; 2 × WH 308 225 hp (168 kW); LIRR MP54s
- Power output: 400 hp (300 kW) (MP54E1/2); 740 hp (550 kW) (MP54E3); 450 hp (340 kW) (MP54E5); 508 hp (379 kW) (MP54E6)
- HVAC: Electric heat
- Electric systems: 650 V DC third rail 11 kV 25 Hz AC catenary
- Current collection: contact shoe (DC), pantograph (AC)
- UIC classification: Bo’2’+Bo’Bo’
- AAR wheel arrangement: B-2+B-B
- Braking system: Pneumatic
- Safety systems: Cab signaling, Automatic Train Control
- Coupling system: AAR
- Track gauge: 4 ft 8 1/2 in (1,435 mm) standard gauge

The Pennsylvania Railroad's MP54 was a class of electric multiple unit railcars. The class was initially constructed as an unpowered, locomotive hauled coach for suburban operations, but were designed to be rebuilt into self-propelled units as electrification plans were realized. The first of these self-propelled cars were placed in service with the PRR subsidiary Long Island Rail Road with DC propulsion in 1908 and soon spread to the Philadelphia-based network of low frequency AC electrified suburban lines in 1915. Eventually the cars came to be used throughout the railroad's electrified network from Washington, D.C. to New York City and Harrisburg, Pennsylvania.

The cars became a commuting tradition during their long years of service in several major cities and were known as "red cars" or "red rattlers". The cars ran in service with the PRR until the Penn Central merger in 1968 at which point they were already being marked for replacement by new technology railcars such as the Budd M1 and Pioneer III. After the bankruptcy of the Penn Central the remaining MP54s found themselves being operated by Conrail under contract with local commuter rail authorities. The last MP54 cars were retired in 1980-81 while engaged in Philadelphia suburban service with SEPTA.

== Steel suburban cars ==
In 1906, during the PRR construction project to build tunnels under the Hudson and East Rivers and build Penn Station, the PRR announced that all new passenger cars would be made of steel and that wooden cars would not be allowed in the tunnels due to the hazard of fire. A design for a steel suburban car with a 54 ft (16.46 m) passenger compartment, 64 ft (19.51 m) overall length, and 72 seats was already under development, along with one for a corresponding passenger-baggage combination car. Anticipating that many of the cars would eventually be used in electrically powered multiple-unit (MU) services, the cars were designed to accommodate electrical equipment and were designated MP54 where the M is for motor and the P is for passenger.

Additional types of these cars were developed, all with the same overall length, body shape, and characteristic round end windows often referred to as porthole or owl-eyed windows and large roof-level headlights. The passenger-baggage combination cars (52 seats) were designated MPB54. In 1911, baggage cars with 62 ft (18.90 m) baggage compartments were added and designated MB62. In 1913, baggage-mail cars with the same dimensions were added and designated MBM62. In 1914, passenger-baggage combination cars with longer baggage compartments and 40 seats were added and designated MPB54B. In 1915, passenger-baggage-mail combination cars with 24 seats were added and designated MPBM54.

== Early DC MP54s ==
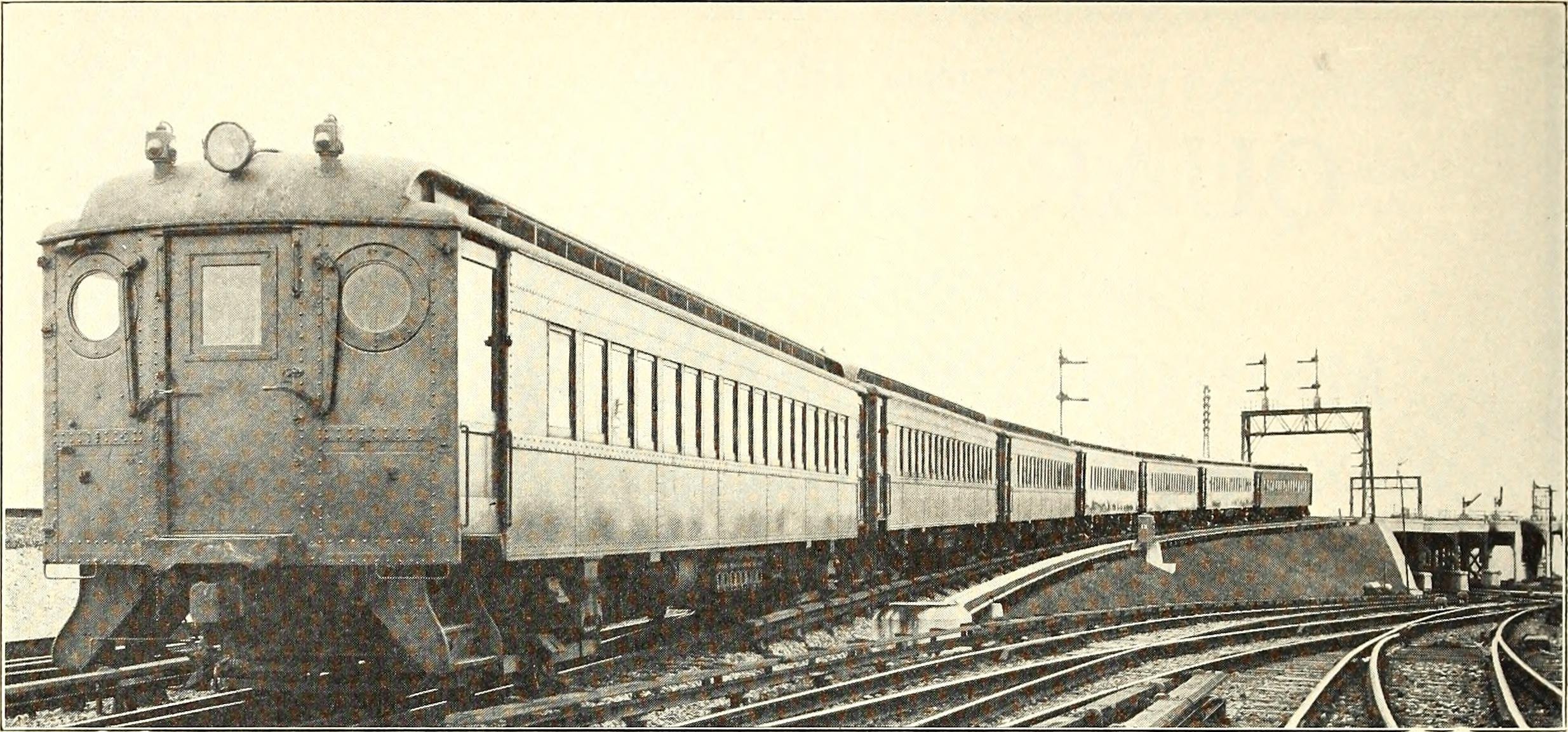
DC MP54s operating for the Long Island Railroad in 1915

The first group of MP54 cars was delivered to the PRR subsidiary Long Island Rail Road (LIRR) in 1908 which was already operating a 650-volt DC electrified service to terminals on Long Island with its fleet of MP41 cars. Some were used for a while in non-electrified service until the East River tunnels were completed allowing service into Penn Station. Simultaneously, the same electrical system was being installed for use in the Hudson River tunnels and west to Manhattan Transfer, just east of Newark for use by the PRR proper.

Between 1908 and 1915 the LIRR received a total of 225 MP54 type DC powered coaches and 65 other powered MP54-type cars. To supplement these, between 1915 and 1927 a total of 230 T-54 class trailer cars were added to the fleet along with a further 320 DC powered coaches between 1920 and 1927. Finally in 1930 a final batch of 45 MP54 coaches were delivered, resulting in a total fleet of 626 coaches, 15 baggage cars, 52 combines and 230 unpowered trailers for a grand total of 923 MP54 type cars in service on the LIRR.

The LIRR MP54 coaches came in three general styles. Classes MP54, MP54A and MP54A1 were delivered with a "railroad" style clerestory roof. Classes MP54B and MP54C were delivered with a smooth, "arch" roof. Finally the MP54D and MP54D1 classes were former steam coaches converted to electric operation with clerestory roofs. Unlike the later PRR cars, the LIRR units were primarily constructed by American Car and Foundry with a few made by Pressed Steel Car Company or Standard Steel Car Company.

In 1910, the PRR received its first group of MP54-type cars. Six of the coaches and two of the combination cars were provided with DC electrical equipment, and the rest were for service in trains pulled by steam or electric locomotives.

Penn Station opened September 8, 1910, with service to Long Island points being provided by LIRR MP54 cars. PRR service out of Penn began November 29, 1910 primarily using electric locomotives. The eight electrified PRR MP54 cars were used for shuttle service between Penn Station and Manhattan Transfer, an island station that facilitated passenger transfer with PRR trains going to or from Exchange Place in Jersey City. This shuttle service ended in 1922, and the cars were sent to the LIRR.

In addition to the cars built for the PRR and LIRR, the West Jersey and Seashore Railroad (which later became part of the Pennsylvania-Reading Seashore Lines) received a small fleet of eighteen 650 V DC powered MP54 cars for use on its electrified interurban line between Camden, Millville, and Atlantic City in 1912. These cars, officially classified as MP54D, came equipped with both third rail and also trolley poles for the segments of the line that made use of overhead lines. These cars were used until electrified service on the PRSL was ended in 1949.

== AC Cars for PRR Suburban Service ==
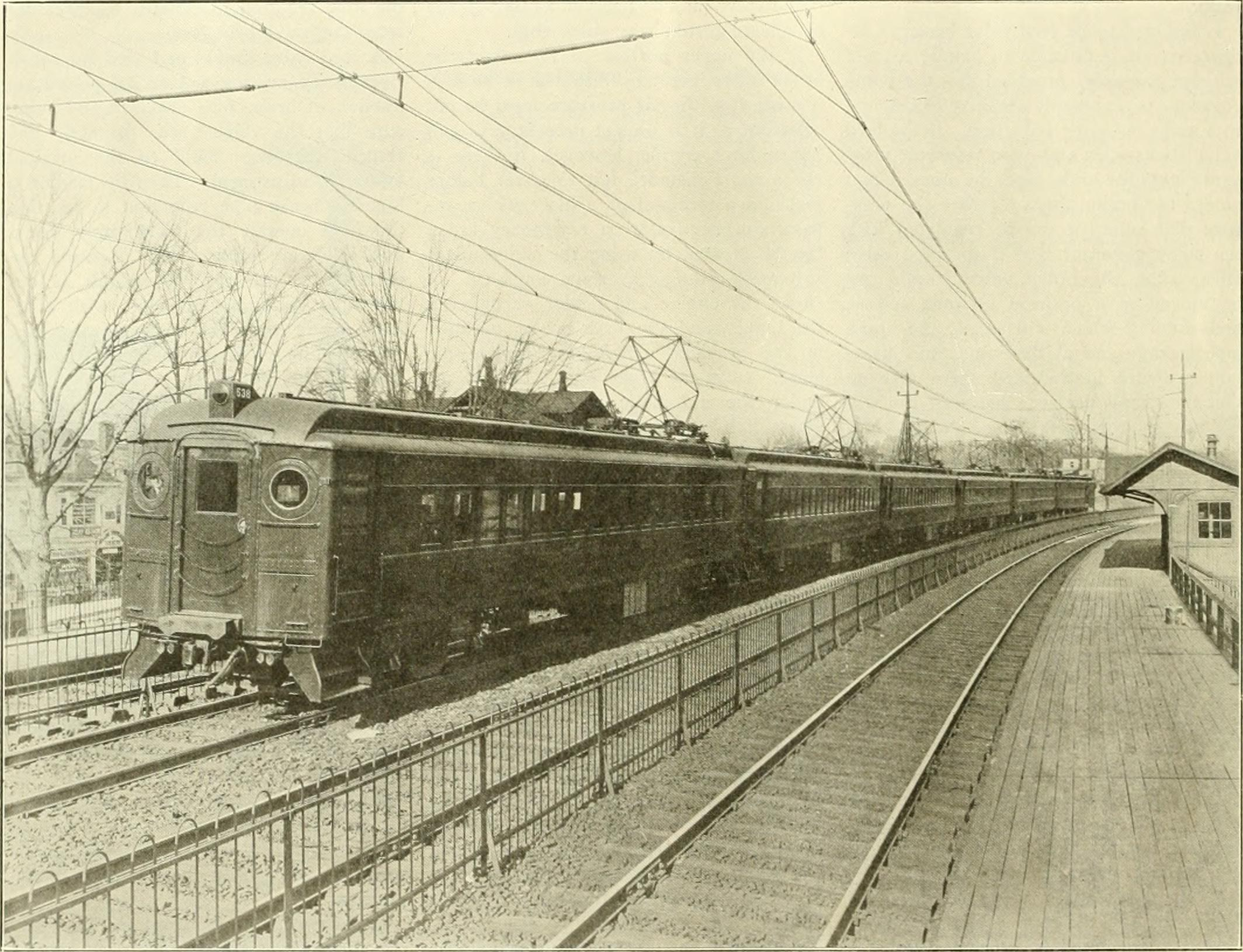
AC MP54s operating for the Pennsylvania Railroad in 1916

In late 1912, PRR engineers recommended large-scale electrification of PRR lines with alternating current (AC) at 11,000 volts and 25 cycles, starting with the suburban service along the Main Line between Philadelphia and Paoli. This project was authorized soon thereafter. In 1914, the PRR started adding AC electrical equipment to 93 MP54-type cars at the Altoona shops for use in this service. Each car received a pantograph, a transformer, a power truck, a motorman's cab and controls at each end, and MU circuits. These cars were then designated MP54E to distinguish them from non-electrified cars.

The Paoli line opened with electrical service in 1915 with great success, and other Philadelphia suburban lines were electrified in succeeding years. By 1933 the entire PRR line from Philadelphia to Penn Station had been provided with AC electrification and the lines from Philadelphia to Washington, D.C. and Harrisburg were subsequently electrified as well. MP54 cars then provided local service throughout this area. Large numbers of MP54 MU cars were obtained both by electrifying existing non-electrified MP54 cars and by purchasing and building entirely new cars. As improved electrical equipment was developed in later years, a numeral was added to signify the type of this equipment. Between 1926 and 1930 a further 144 cars were delivered from PRRs main shops in Altoona, Pennsylvania and Standard Steel in the class MP54E2. Between 1932 and 1937, a total of 46 married pairs were constructed by Altoona that consisted of an unpowered trailer (designated T) that was towed by a motor car (designated E3), with 736 total horsepower compared with the normal 400: 34 (MP54E3+MP54T) + 4 (MP54E3+MBM62T) + 8 (MPB54BE3+MP54T). These special trailer motors could be identified by a small golden keystone above the number on the side of the car. They also had larger louvers on the side due to the greater demand for cooling air.

In time it was apparent to better distinguish between the non-electrified and electrified cars aside from the letter E, thus it was decided to make the initial M be a "small" capital letter for the non-electrified cars. Small capital letters are awkward to use, so many books have used the LIRR scheme of omitting the initial M for the non-electrified cars (P54) while less commonly a lower-case m is used instead of the small capital (mP54).

In 1950, faced with the need for expensive new equipment for unprofitable suburban service, the PRR decided to extend the life of the MP54 cars instead of buying new equipment. The MP54s were rebuilt at PRR's Wilmington, DE electric shops with an initial batch of fifty 450-horsepower (340 kW) cars in the class MP54E5. A follow-up batch of fifty 508 hp cars in the class MP54E6 were rebuilt at the Altoona shops (for unknown reasons, the designation MP54E4 was skipped). In addition to the new, more powerful propulsion gear, other new equipment was installed including roller bearing equipped equalized trucks, new windows, and recessed transit-type lighting In 1951 there were a total of 481 AC MP54 cars of all types in service, consisting of 405 MP54, 42 MP54T, 10 MPB54B, 9 MPB54, 7 MB62, 4 MBM62, and 4 MBM62T cars.

=== Performance ===
While state of the art in 1908, when the last brand new MP54 rolled off the assembly line 28 years later, the design did more to suit the PRR's desire for standardization than the comfort of the passengers that rode them. Each motor car was powered by a single truck at the pantograph end which in turn was equipped with two 200-horsepower (150 kW) 25 Hz series wound AC motors. Using AC motors of this type resulted in poor acceleration compared to equivalent DC motors, a problem that was exacerbated by the frequent stops the MP54s would make in local commuter service. While the 99 E5 and E6 units rebuilt in the 1950s had better performance and a stated top speed of 65 mph (105 km/h), older E1 and E2 cars would struggle to reach 55 mph (89 km/h). A further design flaw in the propulsion gear of the E1 and E2 models required that if power was taken off at speeds above 30 mph (48 km/h), it could not be reapplied until the train slowed back to 30 mph lest arcing damage the motors. The 1908 truck design provided little in the way of ride quality, and friction bearings on unmodified cars retarded performance further. Noise from the primitive toothed gear drivetrain (a characteristic common to contemporary MU cars on other railroads) could become quite loud at high speed which made the relative quiet of unpowered trailer cars (if utilized) attractive to some regular riders.

== Service history ==
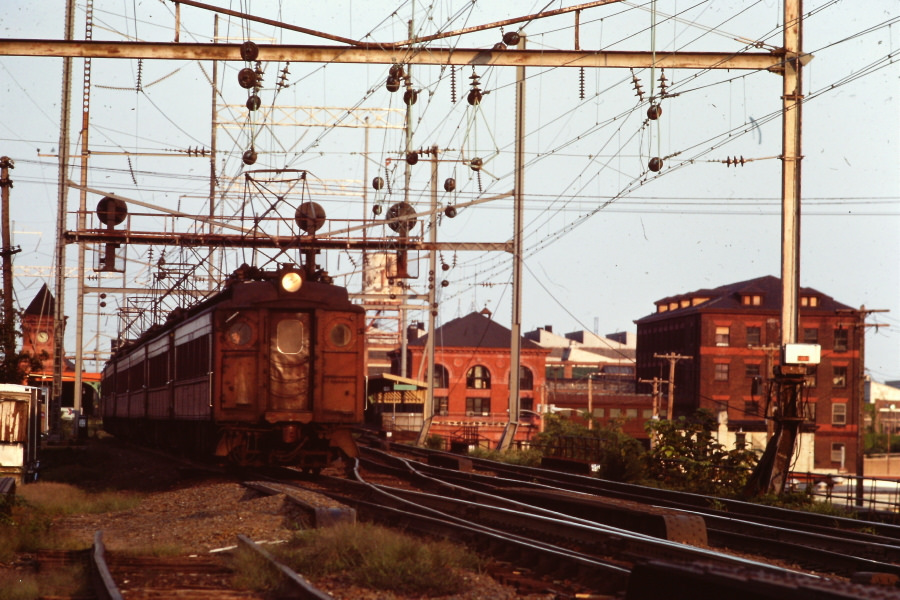
MP54s in Philadelphia suburban service at Wilmington, Delaware

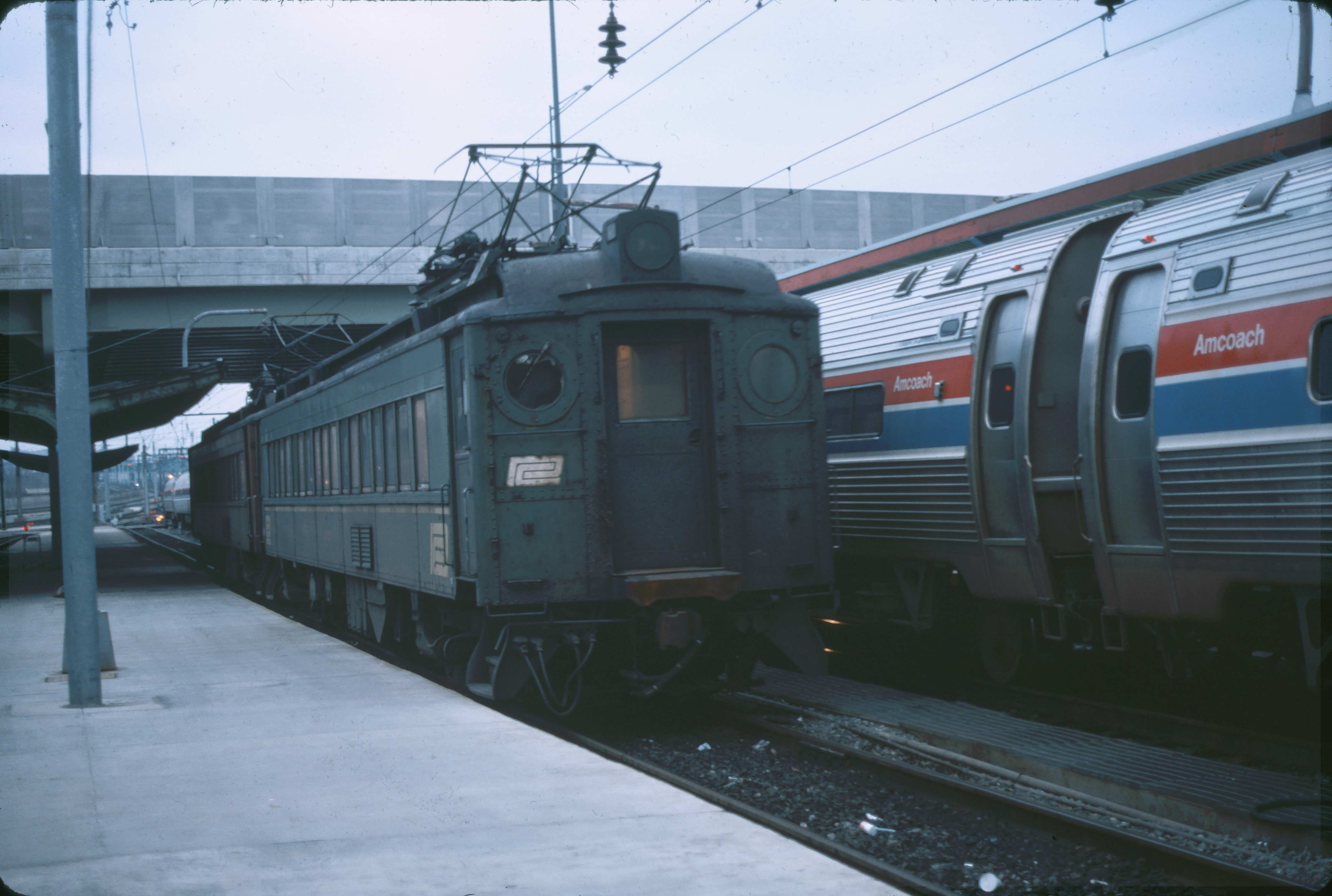
Conrail-operated units entering Washington Union Station in March 1978

The MP54 cars ran from 1915 until 1981 on many lines, through many years of PRR service and into Penn Central, Conrail, New Jersey Department of Transportation, and then SEPTA and New Jersey Transit service. They wore several PRR Tuscan paint schemes as well as Dark Green with white lettering in PC times and a few were painted in white with blue and red stripes during the SEPTA era. Three cars transported train crews and other railroad employees from Washington, D.C.'s Union Station to the Ivy City yards in the blue and white scheme of the Washington Terminal. The MU coaches were assigned to commuter service along both the Keystone Corridor on the Main Line and the Northeast Corridor. They were also found on the Perth Amboy and Woodbridge Railroad taking passengers to and from South Amboy, New Jersey where the New York and Long Branch Railroad began. A set of MP54 cars also served as the shuttle between Princeton Junction and Princeton, and was known to generations of Princeton students, faculty, residents and visitors as the "dinky" or the "PJ&B" (Princeton Junction and Back). For many years a single car was used on a run between South Amboy and Trenton via Jamesburg, mainly to transport high school students. For popular events, particularly the Army–Navy football games in Philadelphia, MP54 cars were used to make up some of the special trains to provide the needed transportation. During World War II, the PRR was often short of passenger equipment on weekends so trains of MP54 cars were used as advance sections of long-distance trains in the electrified PRR area. During these years, the PRR also used solid trains of MB62 and MBM62 cars to carry express from Penn Station to various locations. In the days of Penn Central the MP54s ventured onto former New Haven tracks solely during railfan charters, in particular a June 14, 1970 fantrip from Penn Station to New Haven which included the New Canaan Branch.

Steam-hauled P54 cars served well into the 1950s alongside their MU siblings. While these cars were more commonly seen in commuter service in the Pittsburgh area, they were also used over the entire PRR and perhaps even off-line in troop train service during World War II. Also during this time, several combine style cars were converted to completely coach seating by the addition of seats and porthole windows to the baggage and mail sections. Two of these converted cars were sold to the Buffalo Creek and Gauley Railroad after the war.

At some point during the Penn Central era, several cars were de-motored and used in commuter service behind a GG1 locomotive. A single pantograph was retained on one of the cars to provide heat and lights.

== Disposition of remaining MP54 cars ==
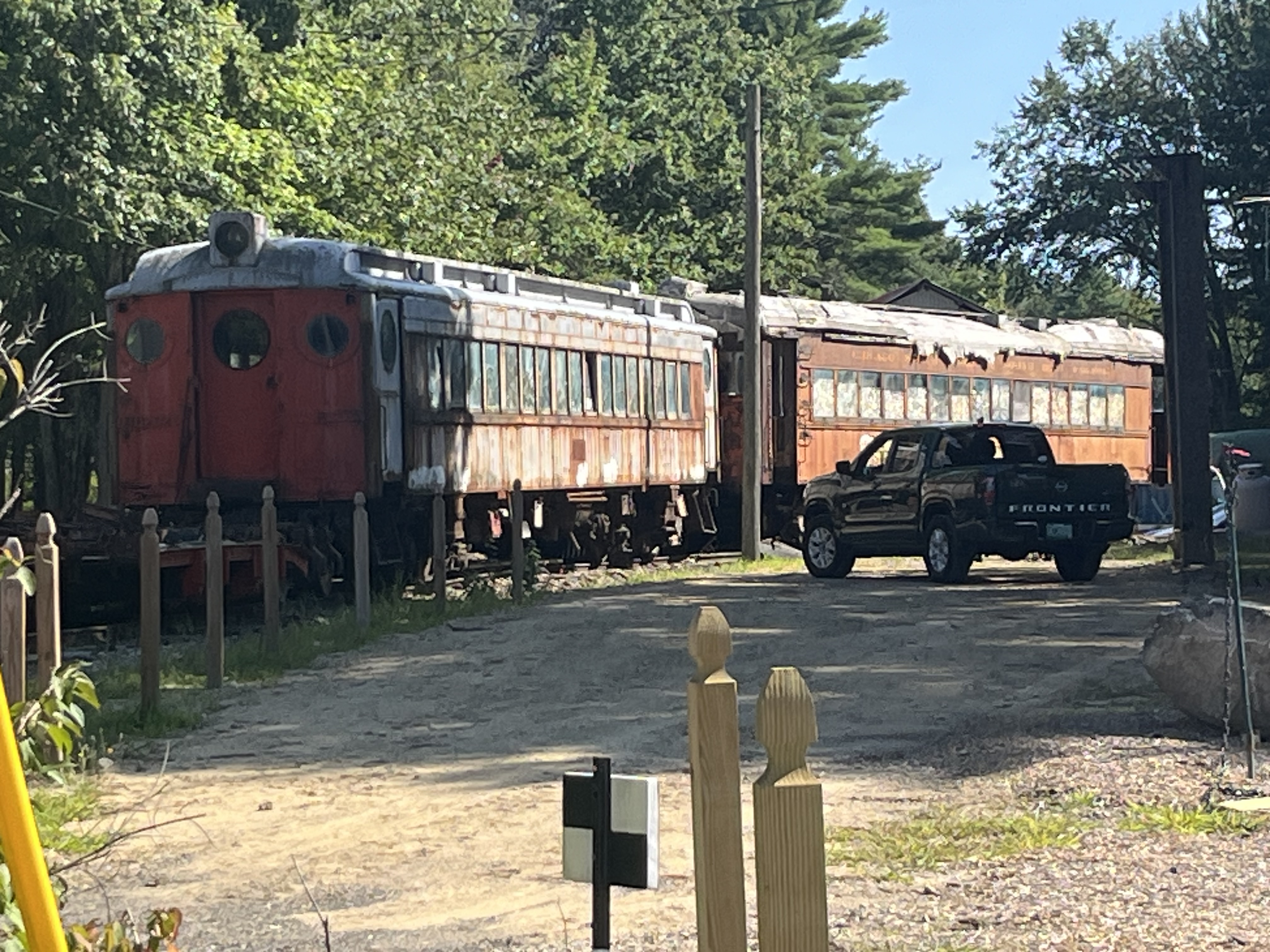
Long Island Railroad 4137 at the Seashore Trolley Museum in 2024

- PRR coach 441 is in active (demotored) use, painted for the New York Central, on the Delaware and Ulster Railroad.
- PRR coach 442 is stored intact, converted into an open-bench car on the Wilmington & Western Railroad.
- PRR coach 444 is in active (demotored) use, painted for the New York Central, on the Delaware and Ulster Railroad.
- PRR coach 447 is in active (demotored) use, painted for the New York Central, on the Delaware and Ulster Railroad.
- PRR coach 450 is stored intact on the Wilmington & Western Railroad.
- PRR coach 542 is currently abandoned derelict (and is missing trucks and underfloor equipment) in Hiltons, Virginia, at the intersection of 709 (Academy Road) and 712 (A P Carter Hwy).
- PRR coach 543 is in active (demotored) use, converted into an open-bench car on the Durbin and Greenbrier Valley Railroad operating as number 203.
- LIRR coach 1149 is displayed intact on the New York State fairgrounds land as part of the Central New York chapter of the National Railway Historical Society collection and is part of the train exhibit in the New York State Fair.
- LIRR combine 1398 is preserved as the Port Jefferson Station/Terryville Chamber of Commerce office in Port Jefferson Station, New York.
- LIRR coach 4137 is stored intact as part of the Seashore Trolley Museum collection although in need of extensive restoration.
- LIRR coach 4153 was part of the Connecticut Trolley Museum collection but was reported by a museum official to have been de-accessioned in 2022.

== MP54 cars on other railroads ==
Unpowered MP54 cars (and/or combines and baggage mail cars) were built for or sold to a number of other railroads. These included AT&SF (Santa Fe), BC&G (Buffalo Creek and Gauley), B&M (Boston and Maine), Erie, Lackawanna, Ligonier Valley Railroad, Midland Continental, NYS&W (New York Susquehanna and Western, Susquehanna), N&W (Norfolk and Western), Piedmont and Northern and Tuckerton. Additional road names reported as possible: CR (Conrail), Consolidades de Cuba, Louisiana and Arkansas, and Union Transportation (Pemberton & Hightstown).

== Similar Pennsylvania railroads' rolling stock ==
In 1907, prior to the purchase of its MP54D's, the West Jersey and Seashore Railroad expanded its wooden interurban fleet operating its electrified service from Camden to Atlantic City and Millville with an order of porthole-window cars, designated MP2. These were still of wooden construction, but came with stronger steel ends, had passenger compartments 46 ft (14 m) long, overall length 55 ft (17 m), 58 seats, and were otherwise similar to the MP54 design. Later some of the original all-wooden MP1 cars were upgraded with steel ends matching the MP2 cars.

The Hudson and Manhattan Railroad obtained some cars with porthole windows in 1911, designated MP38, for their line to Newark. The cars were partly owned by PRR, were painted in PRR colors, had 46 foot passenger compartments, 48 ft (15 m) overall length, 44 seats, and had additional center-entrance doors. The H&M cars not operated over PRR trackage to Newark had the more common square windows.
