= Keystone (train) =

Set of American passenger railcars

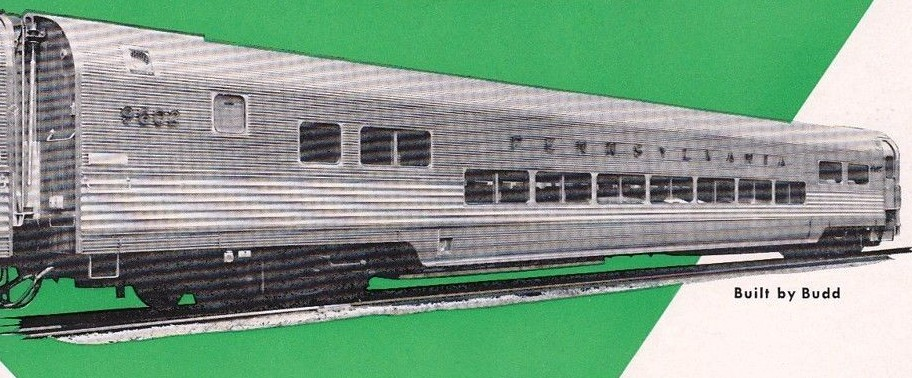
- Illustration of one of the Keystone coaches from a 1956 advertisement.
- In service: 1956–1968
- Manufacturer: Budd Company
- Constructed: 1956
- Number built: 1
- Number preserved: 1
- Formation: 1 power car and 7 coaches
- Design code: HEP: HP53, Coaches: P85K
- Fleet numbers: 9600–9607
- Capacity: 574 (82 per coach)
- Operator: Pennsylvania Railroad

Specifications
- Car length: HEP:53 feet (16.15 m) Coaches:85 feet (25.91 m)
- Width: 9 feet 10 inches (3.00 m)
- Height: 11 feet 9 inches (3.58 m)
- Wheel diameter: 34 inches (0.86 m)
- Wheelbase: 7 feet 2 inches (2.18 m)
- Weight: 91,780 pounds (41,630 kg)
- Power supply: Two Cummins Diesel V12 400HP powering Two westinghouse 440V 3 phase 60 cycle 265KW
- HVAC: 1 AC unit per car
- Track gauge: 4 ft 8 1/2 in (1,435 mm) standard gauge

The Keystone was a set of eight lightweight streamlined cars built by the Budd Company in 1956 for the Pennsylvania Railroad. The set comprised seven coaches seating a total of 574 passengers and a single head end power (HEP) generator car. The train was normally used in New York, New York, to Washington, D.C., service, making two round trips per day. The design was not a success and the cars were retired in 1968.

== Design ==
The coaches were of a unique, split-level design, with the center portion of each car having a floor level two feet below that of standard coaches. This lowered the cars' center of gravity, allowing the train to safely take curves at higher speeds. The coaches were also built to a stressed-skin "Tubular" design, with the shell of the car providing all of the cars structural strength, without the normal heavy steel underframe. This resulted in cars weighing only 60% of what standard cars would weigh.

The split-level design, with short stairways between levels, proved unpopular with passengers, causing bottlenecks during loading and unloading.

== Service history ==
The Pennsylvania introduced the cars in 1956, with the set making two daily round-trips between New York City and Washington, D.C. These services were named Morning Keystone, Midday Keystone, Evening Keystone, and Midnight Keystone. In addition to the tubular coaches all four trains operated with conventional equipment such as dining cars and parlor cars. The Midnight Keystone, which departed New York at 11:10 PM, carried sleeping cars.

The train set was retired from service in 1968 and stored in Altoona, Pennsylvania. Amtrak took possession of the equipment but sold it to the South East Michigan Transportation Authority (SEMTA) in May 1976 for $80,000. SEMTA never used the equipment, and sold it to the Chicago, Central and Pacific Railroad in 1986.
