= Long Island Rail Road rolling stock =

The Long Island Rail Road owns an electric fleet of 202 M9, 836 M7, and 170 M3 electric multiple unit cars, and a diesel and diesel-electric fleet consisting of 134 C3 bilevel rail cars powered by 24 DE30AC diesel-electric locomotives and 20 DM30AC dual-mode locomotives.

== History ==
When the LIRR began operations in 1836, it leased the newly opened Brooklyn and Jamaica Railroad, including its two duplicate steam locomotives, Ariel and Post Boy, both built by Matthias W. Baldwin. (Ariel was Baldwin's 19th engine, built in 1835.) The LIRR soon acquired, through the B&J, Hicksville in 1836 and John A. King (the only engine built by the Poughkeepsie Locomotive Company) in 1838. Post Boy was sold off after an 1852 accident. Both the "Hicksville" and the "John A. King" were likely acquired second hand by the B & J in 1836 and 1838, respectively.

The "Hicksville" was acquired by the B & J in 1836 from a canal building concern "Proprietors of Locks and Canals", based in Lowell, Massachusetts. This company is still in existence. According to Robert Stephenson and Company records, in the year 1831, the firm of "Locks And Canals" purchased two locomotives new from the Robert Stephenson Company (order # 8 and 17) in England. It is likely the B & J purchased one of those two engines, second hand, from Locks And Canals in 1836, and renamed it the "Hicksville" (after Valentine Hicks, second President of the LIRR, and founder of Hicksville, NY). It is also likely, that at some point prior to its re- sale to the B & J, the engine in question was modified to Stephenson's famous 2-2-2 wheel arrangement.

According to "The History Of Brooklyn", by Hazelton, ca. 1920s, the LIRR acquired a second hand locomotive originally named the "Taglioni" from "the Dutchess County (NY) Railway, of British origin, with a large funnel smokestack". This is likely to be the "John A. King". The "Poughkeepsie Locomotive Works" may have only performed a wheel arrangement modification on a pre existing British built locomotive. Poughkeepsie is also located in Dutchess County New York, hence the possible entity name confusion in the Hazelton book.

Long before modern piggyback services, the LIRR began carrying farm wagons aboard flatcars in 1885.

In the early 20th century, the LIRR was a testing ground for the Pennsylvania Railroad's electrification, including Phoebe, its first electric (AA1), and was the first company to extensively electrify its primary lines. The DD1 electric locomotives were developed from the prototypes that were tested on LIRR trackage. Later it saw power such as the B3.

The LIRR's steam passenger locomotives were modernized from 1901 to 1906, and by 1927, it was the first Class I railroad to replace all its wood passenger cars with steel.

In 1926, the LIRR was the first U.S. railroad to begin using diesel locomotives. The last steam locomotive was a G5s operated until 1955.

Electric storage battery cars were used on the West Hempstead Branch (Valley Stream to Mineola) from 1913 until it was electrified in 1926, and on the Bushwick Branch prior to the end of its passenger operations in 1924. The Central Branch from Garden City east to Mitchel Field was electrified with third rail in 1915, but used ex-Ocean Electric Railway trolley cars until 1933. Normal electric trains, such as the MP41 were then used until 1950, when they were replaced by MP54's until the line's abandonment in 1953.

The Metropolitan Commuter Transportation Authority started tests of the first gas turbine-powered commuter rail car in September 1966. In late 1967, a second phase for a dual-mode train with gas turbines that could also run on third rail was expected to begin. The cars, if tests were successful, would provide an alternative to extending electrification, eliminate the need to change from electric to diesel trains at Jamaica, and speed travel. The demonstration program's first phase was expected to cost $1,386,000 (equal to $13,753,385 today), of which the Budd Company, the manufacturer, and New York State covered one-third of the cost, and a grant from the United States Department of Housing and Urban Development would cover the remaining two-thirds.

One of the most popular decisions by Governor Nelson A. Rockefeller after the 1966 takeover was replacing the entire electric passenger fleet with M1 cars. It acquired 770 M1 cars built by Budd and General Electric from 1968 to 1974, and 174 M3 cars, built in 1985 and 1986, also by the Budd Company.

By the late-1990s the LIRR diesel fleet consisted of 28 EMD GP38-2 and 23 MP15AC diesel-electric locomotives, along with approximately 223 passenger cars, mostly former electric multiple units. These trains were operated using 1950s-era P72/PT75 series coaches built by Pullman-Standard, with a diesel-electric locomotive on one end, and for the other end of the train, an older locomotives converted to a "power pack", in which the original prime movers were replaced with 600 horsepower (450 kW) engines/generators solely for supplying HEP (head-end power for the lights and heating) with the engineer's control stand left intact. Locomotives converted included eight and ten Alco FA-1s and FA-2s, four EMD F7s, and one F9. One individual power pack was further converted into a power car for the C1 bilevel cars in the 1990s. The power packs were later sold to other operators, preserved in museums, or scrapped.

In 1997 and 1998, the LIRR received 134 double-decker C3 passenger cars from Kawasaki, including 23 cab control cars, and 46 General Motors Electro-Motive Division diesel-electric locomotives (23 diesel DE30ACs and 23 dual-mode DM30ACs) to pull them, allowing trains from non-electric territory to access Penn Station for the first time in many years, due to the prohibition on diesel operation in the East River Tunnels leading to Penn Station. They were also the first trains with computerized voices (complete with LED sign displays) announcing stations along the routes.

Starting in 1999, the LIRR bought 836 electric M7 electric multiple units from Bombardier, replacing its M1 cars. These cars have an automatic station announcement and LED sign display system. Delivery started in the early 2000s, with the first ones beginning revenue service in October 2002.

On September 19, 2013, it was announced that the LIRR would procure new M9/M9A cars from Kawasaki. This procurement included a firm initial order of 92 cars. Given sufficient funding, an option for an additional 324 cars was available. The cars were to replace the M3s and expand the fleet in preparation for service to Grand Central Madison via East Side Access. The first M9s entered revenue service on September 11, 2019. As of June 2022, 132 M9s have been delivered to the LIRR, and their procurement was nearly three years behind schedule. The last of the M9 cars, were delivered in May 2024, and the last cars entered revenue service in November 2024.

In summer 2017, the LIRR leased 8 single-level coaches from MARC in order to free up their C3 coaches for the Montauk Branch.

The automated announcements provided on the C3 and M7 railcars were voiced by WALL radio host Van Ritshie.

== Active rolling stock ==
=== Locomotives ===
| Builder and model | Photo | Build year | Fleet numbers | Active | Power | Notes |
|---|---|---|---|---|---|---|
| EMD; DE30AC | | 1997–1999 | 400–423 | 24 | 3,000 hp (2,200 kW) | Diesel power only; 423 converted from DM30AC 507 |
| EMD; DM30AC | | 1997–1999 | 500–502, 504–506, 508–510, 512–522 | 20 | Diesel: 3,000 hp (2,200 kW); Third rail: 2,880 hp (2,150 kW) | Dual mode for operation into New York Penn Station; 503 and 511 were wrecked and retired; 507 converted into DE30AC and renumbered 423; 521 wrapped in America 250/LIRR Bicentennial scheme |
| EMD SW1001 | | 1977 | 100–107 | 3 (work service) | 1,000 hp (750 kW) | Work locomotives – not used for passenger service; 101, 105, and 106 sent to New York & Atlantic Railway, but eventually returned to LIRR.; 101 is painted in a heritage LIRR livery. |
| EMD MP15AC | | 1977 | 150–172 | 16 (work service) | 1,500 hp (1,100 kW) | Work locomotives – not used for passenger service; 151, 155, 156, 159 sent to New York & Atlantic Railway; 162, 169 & 170 retired |

=== Future locomotives ===
| Builder and model | Photo | Build year | Fleet numbers | Power | Notes |
|---|---|---|---|---|---|
| Siemens SC-42DM Charger | | 2025-2031 | (44 units) | Diesel: 4,200 hp (3,100 kW); Third rail: 2,100 hp (1,600 kW) | Dual mode for operation into New York Penn Station; 44 locomotives purchased; to be delivered by 2031; To replace DM/DE30AC locomotives |
| Battery-powered rescue locomotive | | TBD | (1 unit) | TBD | Battery locomotive to be used in rescuing broken-down trains in the 63rd Street Tunnel.; Proposed in 2024 due to the current diesels being too large to fit in the 63rd Street Tunnel. |

=== Push-pull coaches ===
| Builder and model | Photo | Build year | Fleet numbers | Active | Notes |
|---|---|---|---|---|---|
| Kawasaki C3 | | 1997–1999 | C car, 5001–5023; T car, 4002–4134 (even numbers); TT car, 4001–4087 (odd numbers) | 134 | Replacements for C1, P72 and P75; Not permitted into Grand Central Madison due to East Side Access tunnel clearances |

=== Electric multiple units ===
| Builder and model | Photo | Build year | Fleet numbers | Active | Notes |
|---|---|---|---|---|---|
| Budd M3 | | 1984–1986 | 9771-9890, 9893-9946 | 94 (passenger) 5 (work service) | To be replaced by M9As, not used for Grand Central Madison services due to grade limitations |
| Bombardier M7 | | 2002–2006 | 7001–7836 | 828 | 7019, 7033-7034, 7044, 7054, 7364, 7425, and 7553 were all scrapped following various incidents |
| Kawasaki M9 | | 2016–2021 | 9001–9202 | 200 | Additional purchase option for M9A cars to be exercised; M9 cars 9157-58 involved in an incident and taken out of service. |

=== Future electric multiple units ===
| Builder and model | Image | Build year | Fleet numbers | Notes |
|---|---|---|---|---|
| Alstom M9A | | 2029-2032 | TBD (160 cars) | To replace the M3 fleet and expand the LIRR fleet.; Options for up to 242 additional available |

== Retired rolling stock ==
=== Locomotives ===
| Builder and model | Photo | Build year | Retired | Fleet numbers | Power | Notes |
|---|---|---|---|---|---|---|
| GE 25-ton | | 1956-1958 | Early-2000s | 397-399 | 150 horsepower (110 kW) | Nicknamed "Dinkys", and used as shop switchers. 398 preserved at Oyster Bay Railroad Museum. 399 preserved at Railroad Museum of Long Island. |
| GE 44-ton | | 1950 | 1963 | 400 | | Sold to several other companies, including the Black River and Western Railroad. Now at the Connecticut Eastern Railroad Museum. |
| AGEIR boxcab | | 1925, 1928 | 1951-1953 | 401, 402 | 600 horsepower (450 kW) | Early "oil-electric" locomotives, designated class AA-2 (401) and AA-3 (402). Scrapped 1951-1953. |
| Baldwin-Westinghouse boxcab | | 1928 | ?? | 403A/403B | 660 horsepower (490 kW) | Early "oil-electric" locomotives, designated class BS-6. Sold to other operators, scrapped in 1955. |
| ALCO S-1 | | 1946-1949 | 1970s | 404-421 | | 407 transferred to Staten Island Railway, others sold to other companies. |
| ALCO S-2 | | 1945-1948 | 1970s | 439-445, 451-460 | | ex-D&H units. |
| ALCO S-2 | | 1948-1949 | 1970s | 446-449, 451-460 | | built for LIRR use 1948-1949. |
| Baldwin DS-4-4-1000 | | 1948 | 1970s | 450 | | |
| ALCO RS-1 | | 1949 | | 461-469 | | |
| ALCO RS-2 | | 1949 | | 1519-1520 | | |
| ALCO RS-3 | | 1955 | | 1551-1560 | | 1556 and 1559 preserved. |
| ALCO FA-2 cab cars | | 1947-1949 | 1999 | 600-610 | "Power packs" converted from locomotives | Prime movers were derated to 600hp, their traction motors were removed and their controls were modified to support 'pusher' service with a EMD GP38-2 |
| ALCO FA-1 cab cars | | 1947-1949 | 1999 | 611-618 | "Power packs" converted from locomotives | Prime movers were derated to 600hp, their traction motors were removed and their controls were modified to support 'pusher' service with a EMD GP38-2 |
| EMD F7/F9 cab cars | | 1950-1954 | 1999 | 619-623 | "Power packs" converted from locomotives | Prime movers were derated to 600hp, their traction motors were removed and their controls were modified to support 'pusher' service with a EMD GP38-2 |
| ALCO C420 | | 1963-1968 | 1976 | 200-229 | 2000 horsepower (1,470 kW) | Replaced by GP38-2s, then leased to the Delaware and Hudson Railway 1976-1977. Many sold off to other operators. |
| EMD GP38-2 | | 1976-1977 | 1999 | 250-277 | | 261,268, 270 & 271 went to New York & Atlantic Railway |
| EMD FL9AC | | 1957-1960 rebuilt 1991 | Late-1990s | 300-302 | | Ex-Metro-North, entered LIRR service in 1992 after being rebuilt by Republic Locomotive. All scrapped by 2005. |

==== Leased units ====
| Builder and model | Photo | Build year | Fleet numbers | Active | Power | Notes |
|---|---|---|---|---|---|---|
| Siemens SC-42DM | | 2025 | 307 | December 2025 | | From Metro-North, sent to LIRR on December 3, 2025 for clearance testing in preparation for LIRR's own SC-42DMs. Returned to Metro-North on December 18. |

=== Multiple units ===
| Model | Photo | Build year | Retired | Fleet numbers | Power | Notes |
|---|---|---|---|---|---|---|
| PRR MP70 | | 1932 | 1972 | 200–201; 1287–1347 | Electric | 200 preserved. |
| PRR MP54 | | 1915 | 1972 | | Electric | |
| PRR MP75 | | 1963 | 1975 | | Electric | Later converted into P75 locomotive-hauled coaches. |
| M1 | | 1968 | 2007 | | Electric | Pairs 9547–9548 and 9411–9412 are preserved. |
| Budd RDC-1 | | 1955 | 1967 | 3101 | Diesel | Retired after being wreck-damaged. |
| Budd RDC-2 | | 1955 | 1968 | 3121 | Diesel | Traded to the Baltimore and Ohio Railroad for the Napannee observation car. |

=== Passenger cars ===
| Model | Photo | Build year | Retired | Fleet numbers | Notes |
|---|---|---|---|---|---|
| P72/P75 | | 1963 | 1990s | | Rebuilt from MP75 coaches. |
| C1 | | 1991 | 1999 | 3001-3010 | Resold to other operators; some now on the Keewatin Railway. |
