= New York Central MU Cars =

New York Central EMUs
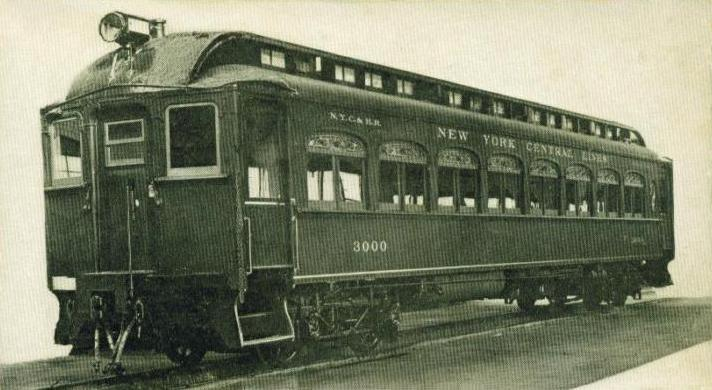
- First of 125 MUs built in 1906 by ACF.
- In service: 1906-1973
- Manufacturers: American Car and Foundry Company; St. Louis Car Company; Standard Steel Car Company
- Constructed: 1906-1929
- Number built: 353
- Number preserved: 3
- Formation: single unit
- Fleet numbers: 4000-4187, 4193-4336, 4350-4361, 4398-4402
- Operators: New York Central; Penn Central Railroad

Specifications
- Car length: 69.3 ft (21.12 m)
- Width: 9 ft 11 1/2 in (3.035 m)
- Doors: 2 vestibule doors
- Maximum speed: 55 mph (89 km/h)
- Traction motors: 2 × GE69 (200 hp); 2 x GE260 (190 hp)
- Power output: 400 hp (298 kW) (1906-1917 MUs); 380 hp (283 kW) (1919-1929 MUs)
- Electric system: 660 VDC
- Current collection: third rail
- Safety system: emergency brakes
- Coupling system: AAR
- Headlight type: Incandescent

The New York Central MU Cars were a series of electric multiple units (EMU) built for the New York Central Railroad in 1906–1929 when the New York Central began electrifying its lines for both the Hudson Division and the Harlem Division.

These were the first electric multiple units ever bought by the New York Central Railroad. They were retired between 1950-1973 by the ACMUs and M1A railcars.

== History ==
The first cars were built in 1906–1907 by American Car and Foundry Company and St. Louis Car Company, which together delivered 182 all steel MUs to the New York Central Railroad. They were built for the electrification of the Hudson Division north of High Bridge and the electrification of the Harlem Division north of Wakefield. The cars were numbered 4000–4173 featured arched stained glass windows located above each set of windows. The glass would be covered later on making it appear that the cars had small and low windows.

In 1910 and in 1913 both the Hudson and Harlem divisions were extended by a combined total of 36 miles. The Harlem line now went to North White Plains while the Hudson line went to Croton-on-Hudson. Additional MUs were ordered between 1913-1929, which totaled 164 that were ordered.

The MUs built from 1917-1929 had regular windows and no stained glass, so they looked like regular heavyweight coaches. This would give the New York Central a grand total of 353 EMUs, which were all motor cars as there was never any trailers ordered.

The New York Central had also purchased 21 combine/baggage MUs built from 1907 to 1910 that were used for the mail services as well as passenger service.

While some of the combines were exactly the same dimensions as the other MUs, the baggage version were notably shorter by 13 feet, compared with the regular MUs. All of these cars would continue service until the arrival of the first order of ACMUs in 1950.

Even though several of the worst cars were removed from service, the rest of the 1906/1907 MUs soldiered on until the next orders of ACMUs in 1962 and finally in 1965. All 1906 MUs were retired by 1963, while the remaining MUs from 1907-1913 and many 1920s era MUs were retired by 1965.

The remaining cars dating from 1924-1929 survived into the Penn Central era. They were built by Standard Steel and renumbered 1250-1296 to make room for other equipment that Penn Central inherited.

The 1200s were either painted in Penn Central's paint scheme or had the Penn Central logo plastered onto the cars. They were retired between 1971-1973 by the new M1A railcars, which also replaced most of the original ACMUs from 1950. After retirement many of these cars were scrapped.

== Preservation ==
Only three cars are known to survive into preservation.

- 1276 (Ex-NYC 4315) is currently at the Toledo, Lake Erie and Western Railway.
- 1291 (Ex-NYC 4331) is at the Southern Michigan Railroad Society in Clinton, Mich., in New York Central paint scheme.
- 1292 (Ex-NYC 4332) is also at the Toledo Lake Erie & Western.
