= C3 (railcar) =

Long Island Rail Road bilevel car

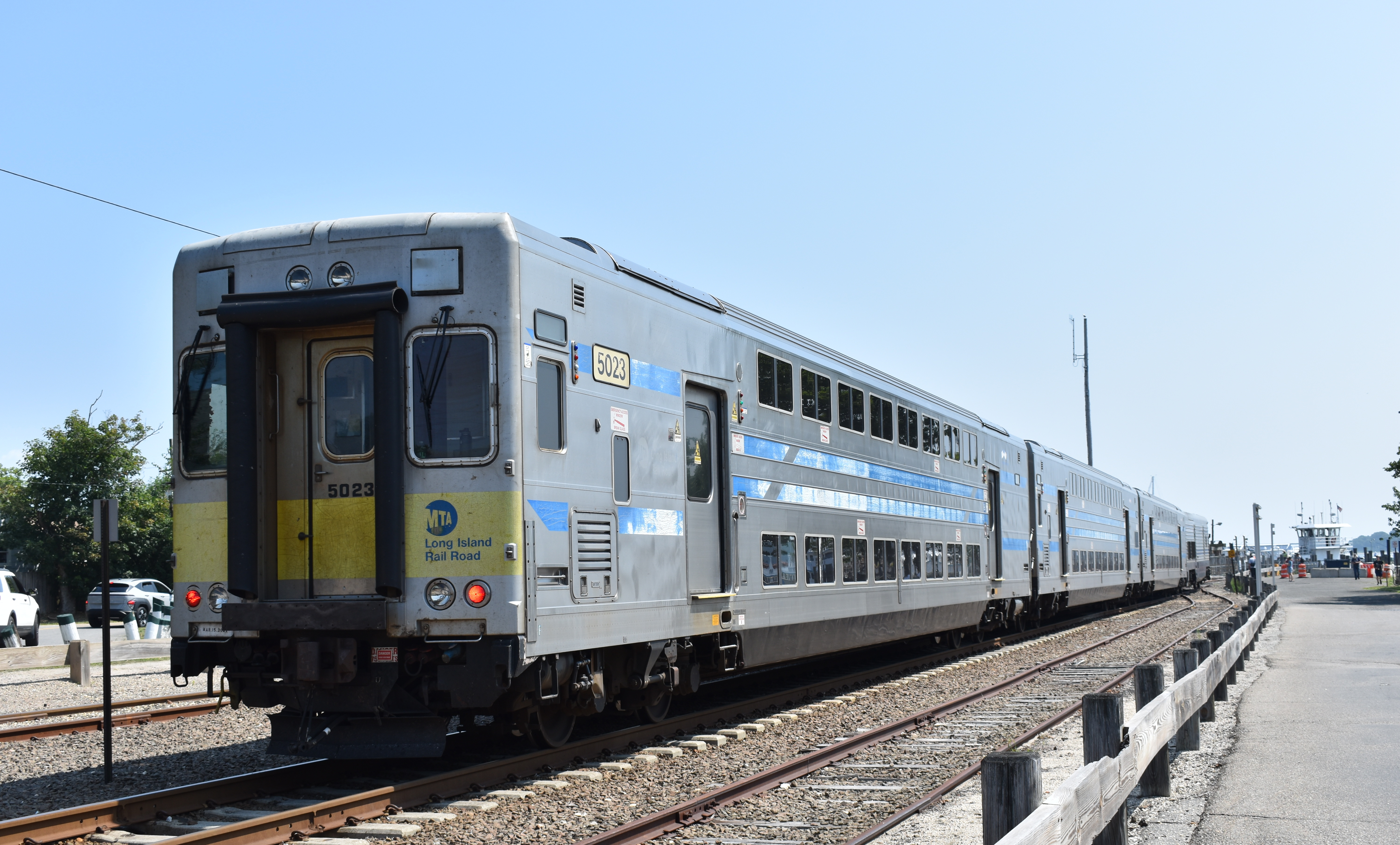
- A train of C3 cars at Greenport station in 2024
- In service: 1998–present
- Manufacturer: Kawasaki
- Replaced: all C1 bi-levels, P72 and P75 single-levels
- Constructed: 1997–1999
- Entered service: Fall 1998
- Number built: Total: 134 cars; C car with toilet: 23; T cars (no toilets), 67; T/T car with toilet, 44
- Fleet numbers: C car: 5001–5023; T car, 4002–4134 (even numbers); T/T car, 4001–4087 (odd numbers)
- Capacity: C car: 137 seated; T car: 143 seated; T/T car: 137 seated
- Operator: Long Island Rail Road
- Lines served: Ronkonkoma Branch; Port Jefferson Branch; Oyster Bay Branch; Montauk Branch

Specifications
- Car length: 85 ft (25,908 mm)
- Width: 9 ft 10 1/2 in (3,010 mm)
- Height: 14 ft 5.59 in (4,409 mm)
- Maximum speed: 100 mph (161 km/h)
- Weight: C Car: 148,771 lb (67,481 kg); T Car: 141,375 lb (64,127 kg); TT Car: 144,338 lb (65,471 kg)
- Power supply: 480 V 3-phase AC 60 Hz
- UIC classification: 2′2′
- AAR wheel arrangement: 2-2
- Coupling system: Type H tightlock knuckle coupler
- Track gauge: 4 ft 8 1/2 in (1,435 mm) standard gauge

The C3 is a bi-level coach railroad car built by Kawasaki. Ordered by the Metropolitan Transportation Authority for use on the Long Island Rail Road (LIRR), the cars began to enter revenue service in 1997. The rail cars are pulled and pushed by EMD DE30AC and DM30AC dual-mode (diesel and electric) locomotives. The C3 cars are powered by 480 V AC head-end power supplied from the locomotive.

== Description ==
There are three types of C3 cars: cab car with toilet (C Car), trailer car (T Car), and trailer car with toilet (T/T car). The C car is normally at the opposite end of a consist from the locomotive.

Unlike the LIRR's electric multiple unit rail cars, which use fully automatic couplers making all connections between the rail vehicles (mechanical, air brake, and electrical) without human intervention, the C3 uses more traditional connectors. Cars are equipped with H type tightlock couplers, two air hose connectors, and MU, COMM, and 480 V 3-phase AC head-end power electrical cables.

The C3s are the first trains on the LIRR to feature automated announcements with LED destination sign displays, announcing the current station, the following station, and destinations along the routes. Over the years of service, the components often fell into disrepair, forcing the train crew to make announcements instead. Recently, the LIRR has made an effort to fix the non-functional components, enabling the destination signs and announcements to work again.

Due to their height, the C3 coaches cannot fit through the 63rd Street Tunnel, and are thus unable to serve Grand Central Madison station.

== History ==
The C3s were ordered following the successful experiment of using the C1 railcars on the LIRR's non-electrified branches, to replace the aging P72 and P75 coaches, which were in use at the time in diesel territory. Delivery of the C3s was delayed for over a year due to production problems.

== Design ==
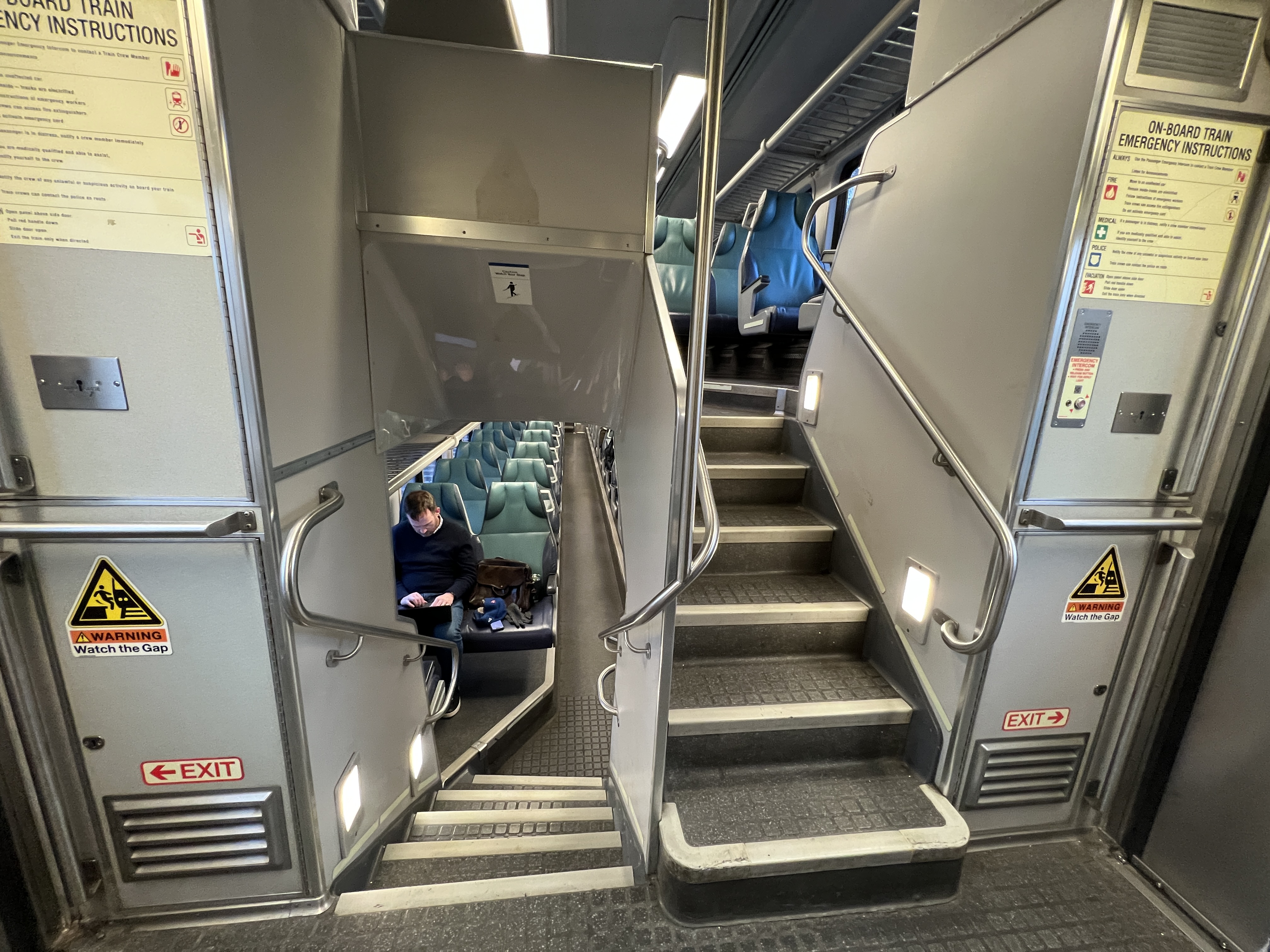
The interior of a C3 car in 2023

The C3s design was largely based on the C1 prototypes, with a few key differences. Seating inside the C3 cars is arranged as 2–2 abreast, with some rows being 2–1 abreast. The lack of a middle seat contrasts with the seating onboard the C1 prototypes; the C1s featured 3–2 abreast seating, which received poor feedback from passengers. The C3s also feature technological upgrades from its predecessors, including LED destination sign displays and automated announcements.

As the C3 cars are designed to use high-level platforms, passengers enter the train on either end of the railcar on a midlevel, entering a vestibule, thence climb or descend a short flight of steps to the upper and lower seating levels; accessible seating is available on the entrance (middle) level. The cars can accommodate two wheelchairs. The seats are cantilevered, mainly to make cleaning easier.

The doors on the sides of the railcars are single-leaf doors, which slide open.

The C3s, like the C1s, are roughly 14 feet 6 inches (4.42 m) in height and, as aforementioned, cannot serve Grand Central Madison due to their height exceeding the maximum clearance in the 63rd Street Tunnel. Additionally, the C3s are not mechanically compatible with the C1s despite the similarities between the two.

== See also ==
- C1 (railcar)
- M1/M3 (railcar)
- M7 (railcar)
- M9 (railcar)
- DE/DM30AC
