= C1 (railcar) =

Retired Long Island Rail Road bilevel car

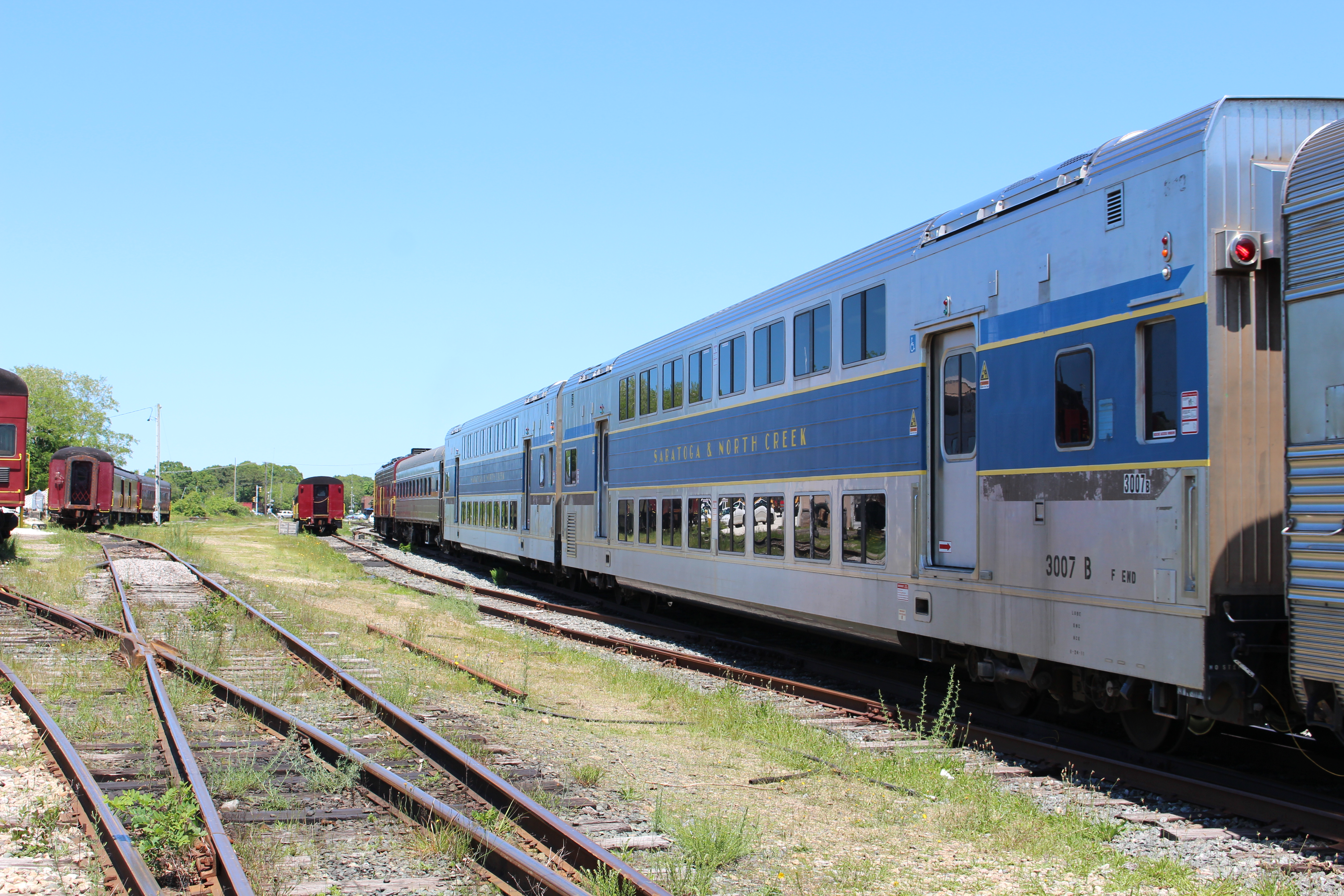
- Two Saratoga and North Creek Railway C1 railcars at Hyannis, Massachusetts in 2013
- In service: 1991–1999 (LIRR)
- Manufacturer: Mitsui/Tokyu Car Corporation
- Designer: Commonwealth Engineering
- Constructed: 1990–1991
- Entered service: 1991
- Number built: 10
- Fleet numbers: 3001–3010
- Capacity: 180–190
- Operator: Long Island Rail Road
- Lines served: Port Jefferson Branch, Cannonball

Specifications
- Car length: 82 feet 2 inches (25.04 m)
- Width: 10 feet (3.0 m)
- Height: 14 feet 6 inches (4.42 m)
- Track gauge: 4 ft 8 1/2 in (1,435 mm) standard gauge

The C1 is a type of bilevel commuter passenger car built by the Tokyu Car Corporation for the Long Island Rail Road (LIRR). Tokyu built ten cars in 1990–1991 as a precursor to the larger C3 order, which would be built by Kawasaki in the late 1990s. The cars were designed by Comeng, one of the last projects that the firm undertook before closing in 1990. After the arrival of the C3s, the Long Island Rail Road sold the C1s to private owners.

== Background ==
In the 1980s, the LIRR operated two types of trains: electric multiple units, which operated over the railroad's electrified lines, and diesel-locomotive-hauled trains on the non-electrified portions. Service into the borough of Manhattan was electric only. The rolling stock used for the LIRR's diesel service was aging, and there was political interest in offering a one-seat ride for commuters on the busy but only partially electrified Port Jefferson Branch. The LIRR decided to solve both problems simultaneously: it would acquire several dual-mode EMD FL9 locomotives from the Metro-North Railroad and buy a small fleet of new passenger cars to go with them. If the experiment was successful, it could proceed with a larger order and replace the diesel fleet.

== History ==
The Budd Company had built the most recent additions to the LIRR's electric fleet, the M1 and M3, but by the mid-1980s, it was a subsidiary of Thyssen and exiting the railroad business. Therefore, in 1986, the LIRR approached Comeng, Budd's Australian licensee, about the project. The LIRR's original request for proposal, issued in 1986, called for a single-level design. This was due in part to the difficulties the railroad experienced with the PRR MP70 electric multiple units, which it had retired in 1972. Comeng persuaded the LIRR to adopt a bilevel design instead.

Three groups responded to the revised LIRR proposal: Comeng/Mitsui, Alsthom, and Sumitomo/Nippon Sharyo. The LIRR favored the Comeng design, but the company's ability to fulfill the contract was jeopardized by the instability of Australian National Industries, Comeng's corporate parent. In the end, Comeng sold the design of the C1 to Mitsui, who then engaged Tokyu Car Corporation to build the cars. The LIRR officially ordered ten cars from Mitsui on October 7, 1988. The contract was estimated at $22.4 million. Comeng remained involved in design and testing.

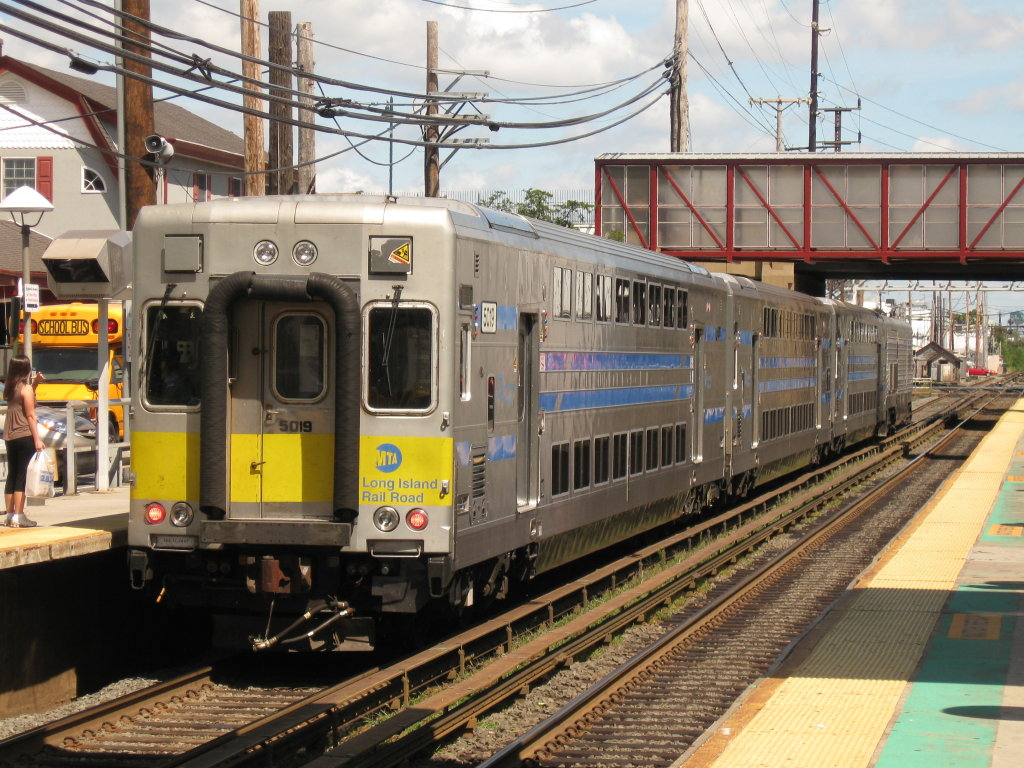
The C1 served as the model for the Kawasaki C3, which began entering service in 1997.

Tokyu constructed the cars between 1990–1991, with deliveries completing in early 1991. Trains began running in August 1991. The cars ran well and were well-received by commuters. The rebuilt FL9 locomotives allowed operation through the East River Tunnels into Pennsylvania Station. The LIRR proceeded with a full production order in 1994. Several former Comeng engineers drafted the specification for what became the C3 car. This design was based on the C1, but updated based on several years' experience with the cars and feedback from passengers.

The C1s were mechanically incompatible with the C3s and were stored as the new cars arrived in 1997–1998. The LIRR sold them to Mid Atlantic Rail Car in 1999. Iowa Pacific Holdings acquired them in 2007 for use on various excursion services. Four of these railcars were acquired by the Keewatin Railway in 2024 where they will be used in revenue passenger service between The Pas and Pukatawagan. Service has been temporarily delayed until they find a boarding solution as the C1s lack steps, since they were manufactured for high-level platform operation, whereas the line to Pukatawagan does not feature any platforms.

== Design ==
The C1 stands 14 feet 6 inches (4.42 m) tall. This was necessary in order for the car to fit through the East River Tunnels, and shorter than similar designs such as the gallery cars used in Chicago and other cities or Amtrak's Superliners, both of which exceed 15 feet (4.6 m). The cars are 82 feet 2 inches (25.04 m) long and 10 feet (3.0 m) wide.

The car has vestibules at both ends. It was designed for use at high-level platforms, so the doors sit roughly 4 feet 3 inches (1.30 m) above the rail. The interior is split into lower and upper levels, with accessible seating on the entrance level. On the upper and lower levels, seating is 3–2, similar to other LIRR and Metro-North cars. This dense arrangement permits a maximum capacity of 180–190 passengers. Each level measures 6 feet 5 inches (1.96 m) from floor to ceiling. Passenger response to the 3–2 seating was poor, leading to the adoption of 2–2 seating in the C3.
