= ACMU =

Class of American electric multiple unit

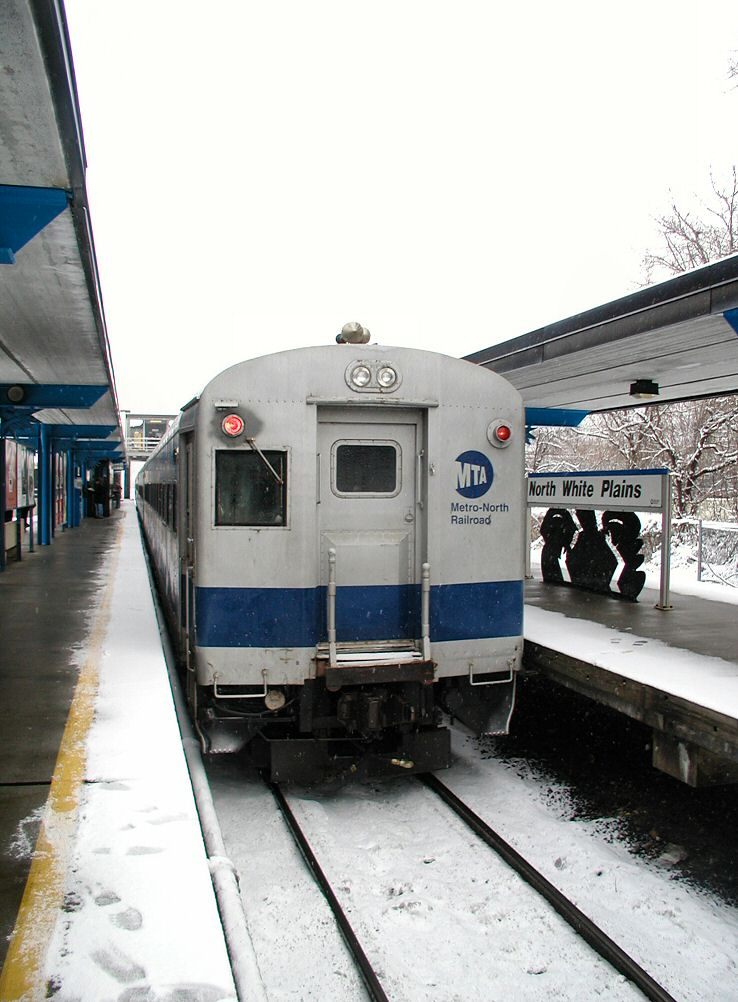
- ACMU at the North White Plains station in 2004.
- In service: 1950–2004
- Manufacturers: 4500 series: St. Louis Car Company; 4600/4700 series, MP75: Pullman Standard
- Constructed: 4500 series: 1950–1951; 4600 series: 1962; 4700 series: 1962–1965; MP75: 1963
- Number built: 4500 series: 100; 4600 series: 26; 4700 series: 61; MP75: 30
- Number preserved: 4
- Successor: 4500 Series: M1a; 4600/4700 series: M7a; MP75: C3
- Formation: Single unit
- Fleet numbers: NYC: 4500–4599 (later MN 1000–1099); NYC: 4600–4625, 4700–4726, 4750–4783 (later MN 1100–1186); LIRR: 2525–2536, 2675–2692
- Capacity: 130
- Operators: New York Central; Penn Central Railroad; Conrail; Metro-North; Long Island Rail Road

Specifications
- Car length: 85 ft 0 in (25.91 m)
- Width: 10 ft 11 1/2 in (3.340 m)
- Doors: 2 vestibule doors
- Maximum speed: 80 mph (130 km/h)
- Weight: 114,000 lb (52,000 kg)
- Traction motors: 4 × GE 1240 (100 hp); 4 × WE 1453-A (100 hp) - LIRR MP75 only
- Power output: 400 hp (300 kW)
- HVAC: Electric heat, air conditioning
- Electric system: 660 V DC third rail
- Current collection: Contact shoe
- Braking system: Pneumatic
- Safety system: emergency brakes
- Coupling system: AAR

The ACMUs (short for Air Conditioned Multiple Unit) were a series of electric multiple unit railcars built for the New York Central Railroad in three orders between 1950 and 1965. The ACMUs were intended to replace/supplement the original fleet of heavyweight MU cars, some of which dated to the start of electric operations on the New York Central. These were the first New York Central units to offer air conditioning, with sealed windows replacing the drop sash and clerestory types found on earlier cars. The initial set of 100 cars was retired in 1970, upon completion of the M1 railcar delivery, while the second and third orders, totaling 87 cars, remained in service until 2004, when they were replaced by the new M7 fleet.

An order of near-identical cars was built for the Long Island Rail Road as the MP75 class in 1963. The LIRR cars were eventually converted to non-powered push-pull coaches before being retired in the late 1990s.

== History ==
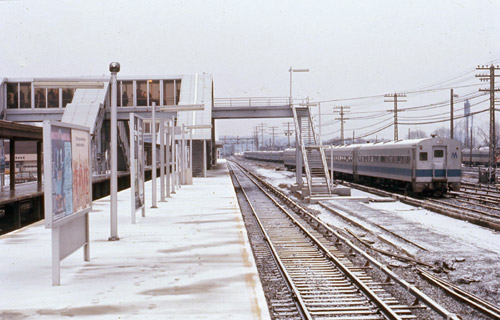
A set of ACMUs at Croton–Harmon in 1976

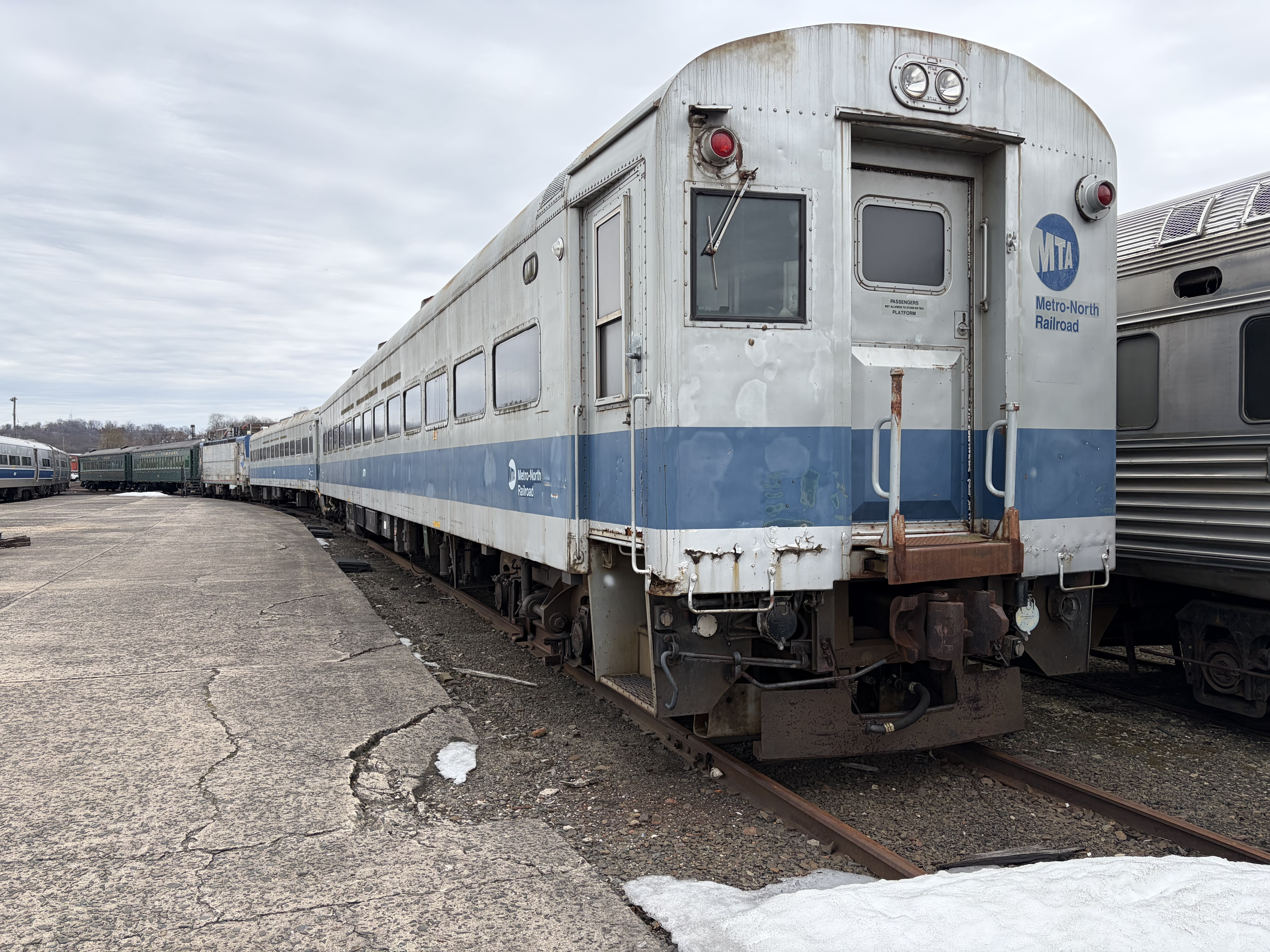
ACMU car Nos. 1128 & 1171 at the Danbury Railway Museum

The ACMU fleet was intended to replace some of the oldest MU cars on the New York Central system, many of which were already 40 years old and dated from the start of electrified service in 1906. The first series of 100 cars were ordered from the St. Louis Car company in 1949 and paid for by the New York Central railroad itself. 10 years later the financial condition of the railroad had deteriorated while the original MU fleet had only gotten older and less reliable. In 1962, the Central ordered an additional batch of 26 ACMUs from Pullman Standard and to assist the Central to improve its commuter rail service, the Port Authority of New York and New Jersey purchased an additional 27 cars which were numbered in the 4700 series to distinguish them from the Central owned cars in the 4600 series. In 1965 a second order of 34 4700 cars was purchased by the Port Authority bringing the total of 4600/4700 series cars to 87.

In 1968, the New York Central was merged into the Penn Central railroad and the 4500 series were renumbered into the 1000 series and the 4600 and 4700 units renumbered into the combined 1100 series. With the railroad's finances worse than ever, the state acted to further prop up the ailing commuter operations and its fleet of several hundred remaining pre-war MU cars through the purchase of 174 new M1A "Metropolitan" railcars which were delivered between 1971 and 1973. By this point, the original 4500 series was 20 years old and in need of a mid-life overhaul. Due to the effects of deferred maintenance that took place in the 1950s, before the State funding became available, the decision was made to simply replace the fleet with new M1As instead of attempting to rebuild the run-down 4500s, although one car, #1037, lingered in service for several more years as a special car for a private car for commuters. Starting in 1976, Conrail took over the state-supported commuter operations from the bankrupt Penn Central using the combined fleet of M1As and 1100 series ACMUs.

In 1983, Metro-North took over operations from Conrail and embarked on a capital improvement program that included the installation of cab signals on its main lines. 34 cars were sent to Morrison-Knudsen for a rebuild to be equipped with cab signals with another 34 cars getting a lighter rebuild in-house. The remainder of the fleet was retired leaving Metro-North with 68 active 1100-series ACMU cars. The non-cab signal equipped cars were referred to as "B cars" and used in the middle of trainsets. ACMUs were restricted from operating to Brewster North in later years because the ACMUs were never fitted with the FRA required ditch lights for operation over grade crossings, per a 1997 mandate.

The ACMU fleet continued on in service until 2004 when they, and most of the M1As were replaced by the new order of M7A railcars. In their last decades of service, the ACMUs were generally restricted to rush hour service on locals to North White Plains and Croton-Harmon. Two cars, 1128 and 1171, were preserved and sent to the Danbury Railway Museum. Two additional cars, 1105 (originally #4605) and 1153, are preserved at the Kentucky Railway Museum.

=== MP75 ===
In 1963, the Long Island Rail Road placed an order with Pullman Standard for a nearly identical set of MUs based on the 1962 New York Central order. The LIRR units were virtually identical except for some minor cosmetic differences, Westinghouse control equipment, MU capability with older LIRR MU rolling stock, automatic doors and Automatic Speed Control. The order was broken into two sub-classes with a total of 12 MP75C control cars with cabs on each end, and 18 MP75T trailer cars without cabs. Each car had 400 HP with four Westinghouse 1453-A motors and an XC-548D cam control group.

The MP75s were ordered in part for expanded service to the 1964 World's Fair and were sometimes known as the "World's Fair Cars", but their superior performance compared with the aging MP54s and even more recent MP72 and MP70 cars lead them to be nicknamed the "Zip Cars". The MP75s continued on in self-propelled service until the final deliveries of the Budd M1 order by 1973, and were converted to non-powered locomotive hauled push-pull P75 cars. They were replaced by 1999 with the Kawasaki bi-level C3 railcars.

== Design ==
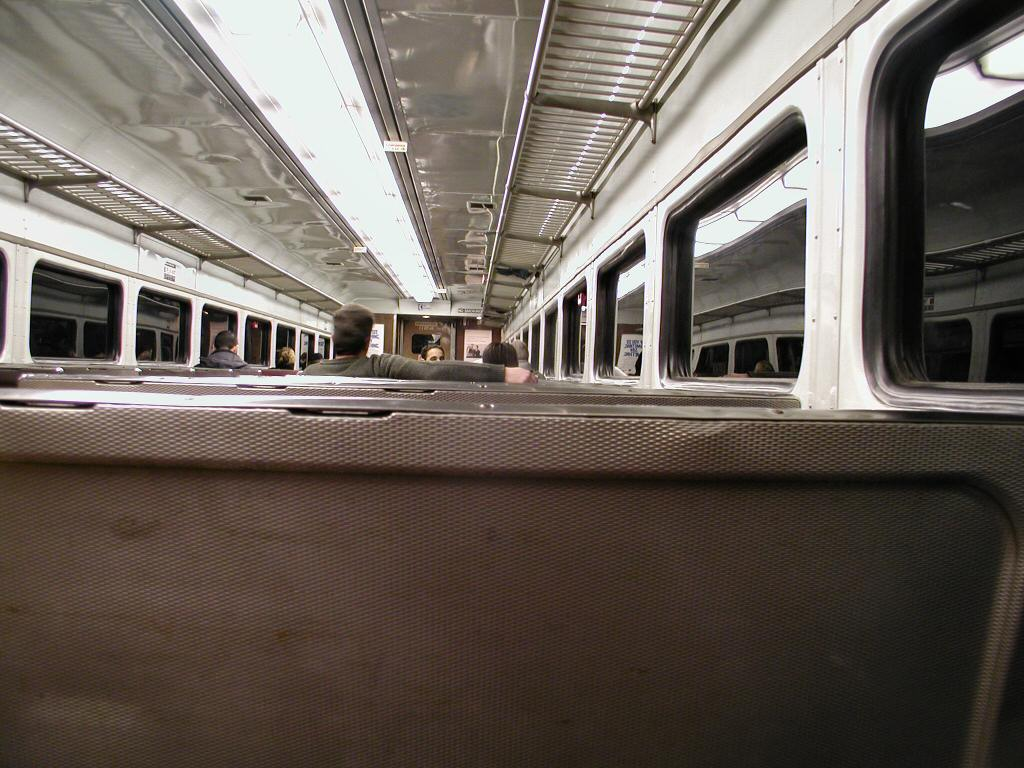
ACMU interior

The ACMUs represented a significant upgrade compared to the heavyweight cars that came before them. In addition to air conditioning and large sealed windows, the cars had flush steel panel sides with smooth rounded vents. The initial paint scheme was khaki green with yellow lettering and a yellow stripe below and above the windows. The lettering was eventually replaced by Penn Central decals and then an overall white with a large blue stripe in the Metro-North era.

The propulsion systems were significant upgrades featuring camshaft driven motor controllers that offered both higher and smoother acceleration. The air compressors and motor gear train were far quieter; that along with the sealed windows and fluorescent lighting provided an isolated and relaxing environment for the passengers. Seating consisted of reversible 3-2 bench seats with a synthetic canvas covering with a total capacity of 130 persons per car, far more than the cars they replaced. The cars were built with manually operated doors that contained convertible traps for low-level operation. After the electrified lines were converted to all high level operation with the arrival of the M1A cars, the ACMUs were left in their high-level configuration full-time. The manual side doors were never automated resulting in the frequent practice of doors being left open for the entire duration of a trip.

There were a few differences between 4500 series and later 4600 and 4700 series. The 4500 series had much larger windows as well as a single large-diameter headlamp in the centre of the car above the door. The 4600/4700 cars had much narrower windows with a twin sealed beam headlamp above the door. The 4500 series also had windows on both sides of the car end, where the 4600/4700 cars only had a window on the engineer's side. The only difference between the 4600 and 4700 cars was that the centerline of the windows on the 4700s was 4 inches (10 cm) lower due to passenger feedback.

== See also ==
- New York Central MU Cars
- Budd Silverliner
