= PRR MP70 =

Class of 63 American double-deck electric multiple units

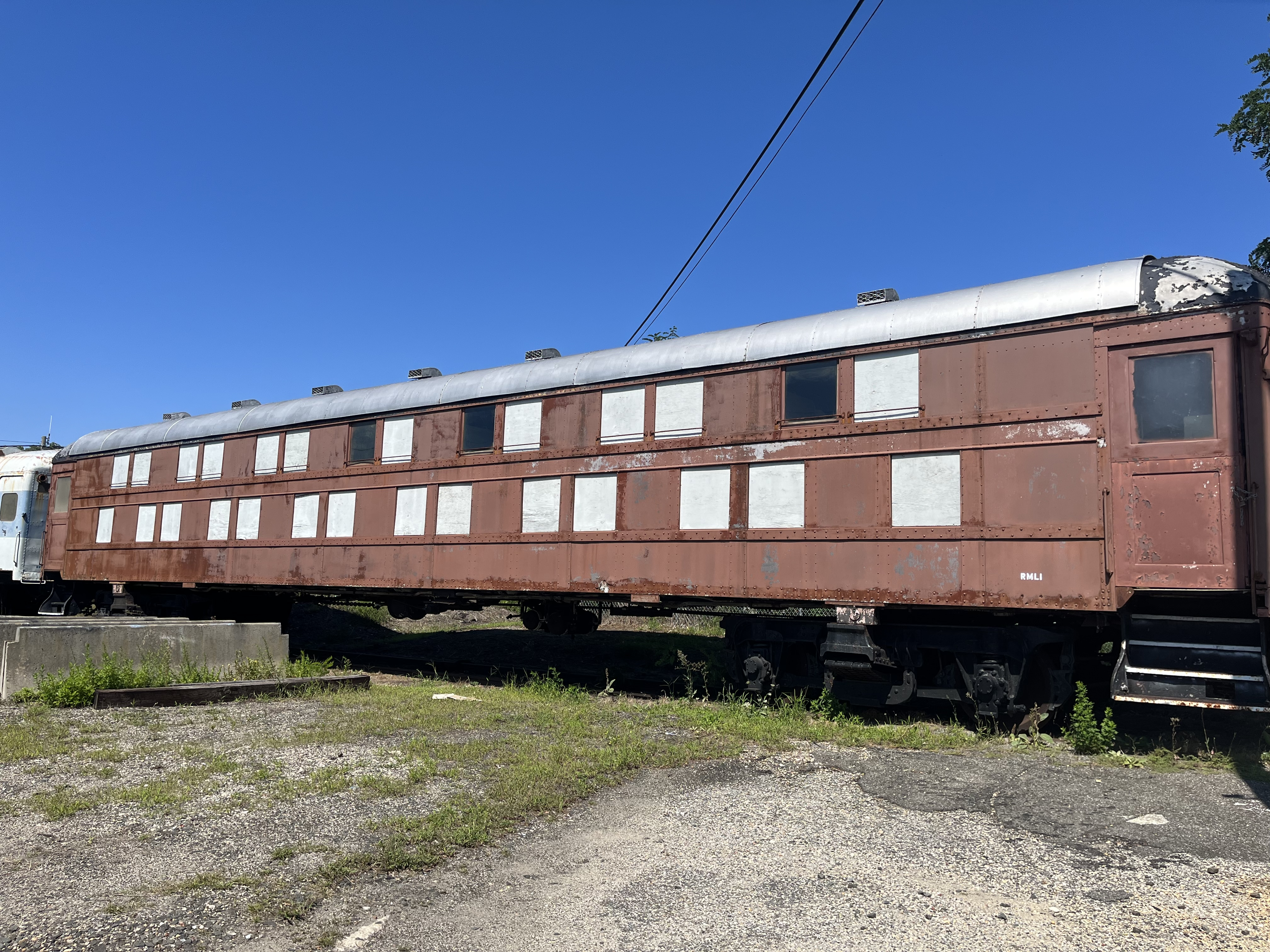
- Ex-PRR MP70 No. 200 at the Railroad Museum of Long Island in 2023
- In service: 1932–1972
- Manufacturer: Pennsylvania Railroad
- Replaced: MP41
- Constructed: 1932–1949
- Scrapped: 1972–1973
- Number built: 63
- Number preserved: 1
- Number scrapped: 62
- Fleet numbers: 200–201; 1287–1347
- Capacity: 120 (200), 132
- Operator: Long Island Rail Road

Specifications
- Car body construction: Aluminum
- Car length: 80 ft 8 3/4 in (24.606 m)
- Height: 14 1/2 feet 1 1/2 inches (4.458 m)
- Weight: 94,000–121,000 pounds (43,000–55,000 kg)
- Traction motors: 2 x WH 559 230 hp (170 kW)
- Electric systems: 650 V DC third rail
- Current collection: Contact shoe

The PRR MP70, also known informally as the "double-deckers", was a class of electric multiple units manufactured by the Pennsylvania Railroad for use on the Long Island Rail Road (LIRR). The Pennsylvania Railroad manufactured three prototypes in the 1930s and a full fleet of sixty cars in 1947–1949. They were among the first examples of bilevel rail cars in the United States. The design was unpopular with both LIRR employees and commuters; the last cars were retired in 1972. A single example, the prototype, is preserved at the Railroad Museum of Long Island.

== Design ==
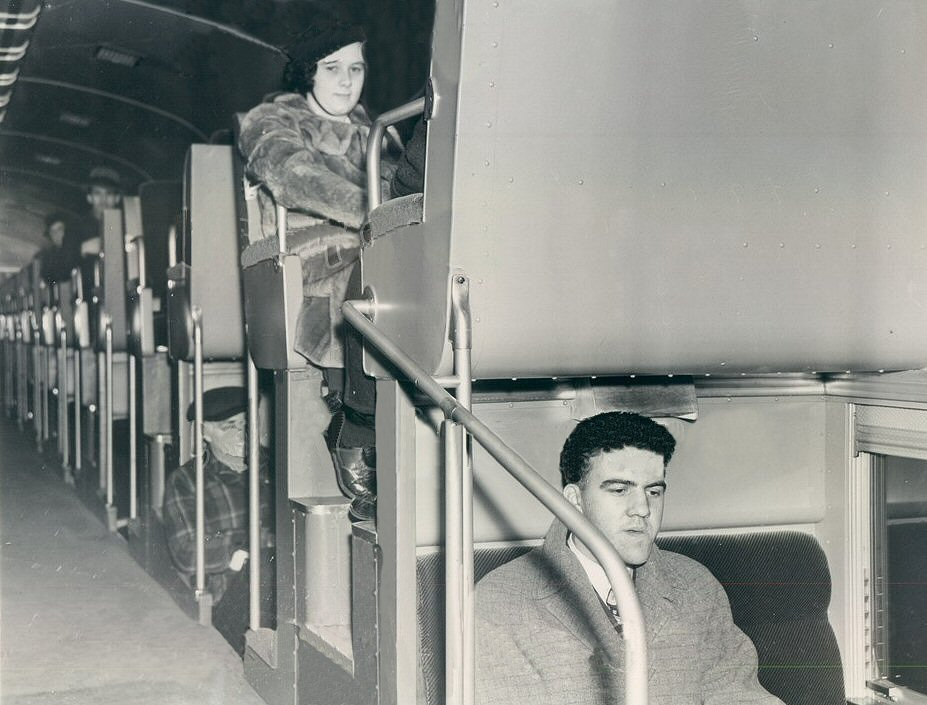
Interior of an MP70 car

The MP70 was an early attempt to increase the capacity of commuter trains without lengthening the train, foreshadowing the successful gallery cars introduced after World War II. The car was not a true bilevel design. It featured a single level with a centerline aisle, and two levels of seats, with the second staggered above the first. Passengers stepped up or down to reach the seats, which were in a facing 2×2 arrangement. This unusual arrangement was devised by Albert E. Hutt in 1928. The original prototype trailer seated 120 passengers, the first prototype motor car 134; all others 132.

The Pennsylvania Railroad constructed the cars out of aluminum. This led to significant weight savings in the prototype: 71,800 pounds (32,600 kg) compared to an expected 110,900 pounds (50,300 kg) had the Pennsylvania used steel. The car was even slightly lighter than the single-level PRR MP54s then in service. Prototype No. 200 was 72 feet (22 m) long; all others were 80 feet (24 m). Production motor cars weighed 121,000 pounds (55,000 kg); trailers weighed 94,000 pounds (43,000 kg). The cars stood 14 1/2 feet 1 1/2 inches (4.458 m) tall, short enough for the clearances in Pennsylvania Station and the East River Tunnels.

== History ==
The Pennsylvania Railroad constructed the original prototype No. 200 in 1932. It was an unpowered trailer, with a seating capacity of 120. It entered revenue service on August 13, 1932. Two more prototypes arrived in December 1937: Nos. 201 (another unpowered trailer) and 1347 (a motor car). Because of the scarcity of aluminum, no further cars were built until after World War II. After World War II, the LIRR acquired sixty more double-decker cars. The first ten, five pairs of motor cars and trailers, entered service in 1947. Each car cost $102,000. The remaining fifty, forty-three motors and seven trailers, entered service in 1948–1949. The per-car cost rose on this order to $143,000.

Although the LIRR claimed early on that "the passengers like them fine", the double-deckers were not successful. An early indicator was the LIRR's order in 1953 for twenty single-level multiple units from Pullman-Standard. These seated five across in a 3×2 configuration, for a maximum capacity of 128: nearly that of the MP70, but in a more conventional design. The split-level seating slowed boarding at stations and made ticket collection cumbersome. Cleaning the cars took longer than with single-level units because of the odd angles. On rainy days, water could run down into the lower seats from the center aisle. The facing seats earned the cars the derisive sobriquet "knee-knockers", while female passengers complained about the lack of modesty when seated in the upper level.

The LIRR withdrew the last double-decker on February 29, 1972. William Ronan, then chairman of the Metropolitan Transportation Authority (MTA), cited mechanical unreliability, high operating costs, passenger discomfort, and the entry of new M1 railcars into service. The experience soured the LIRR on the concept, and it did not contemplate double-decker cars again until the late 1980s, when it ordered the C1 coach. No. 200, the original prototype, is preserved at the Railroad Museum of Long Island.
