= M9 (railcar) =

Long Island Rail Road and Metro-North car

M9/M9A
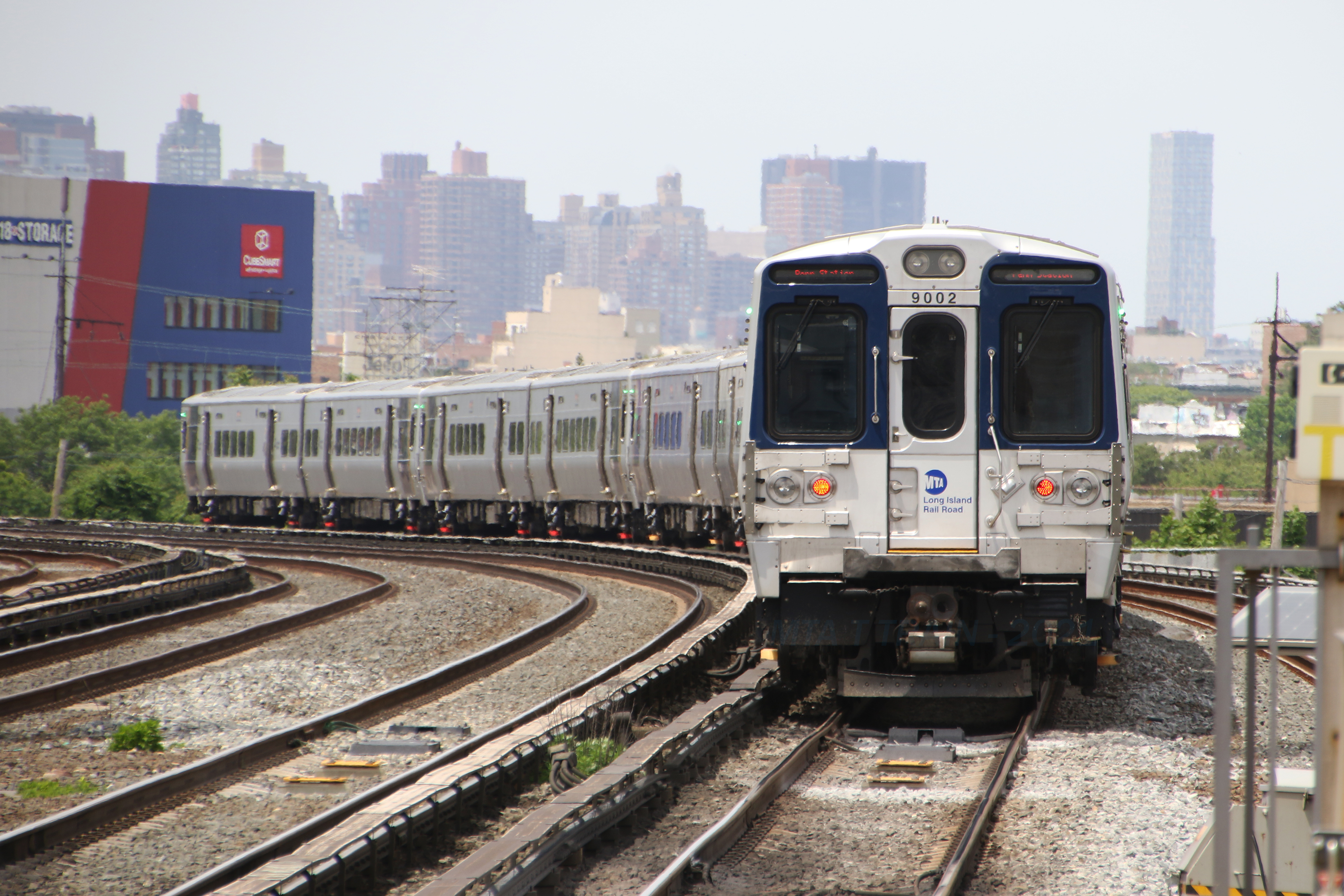
- LIRR M9 #9002 leaving Woodside

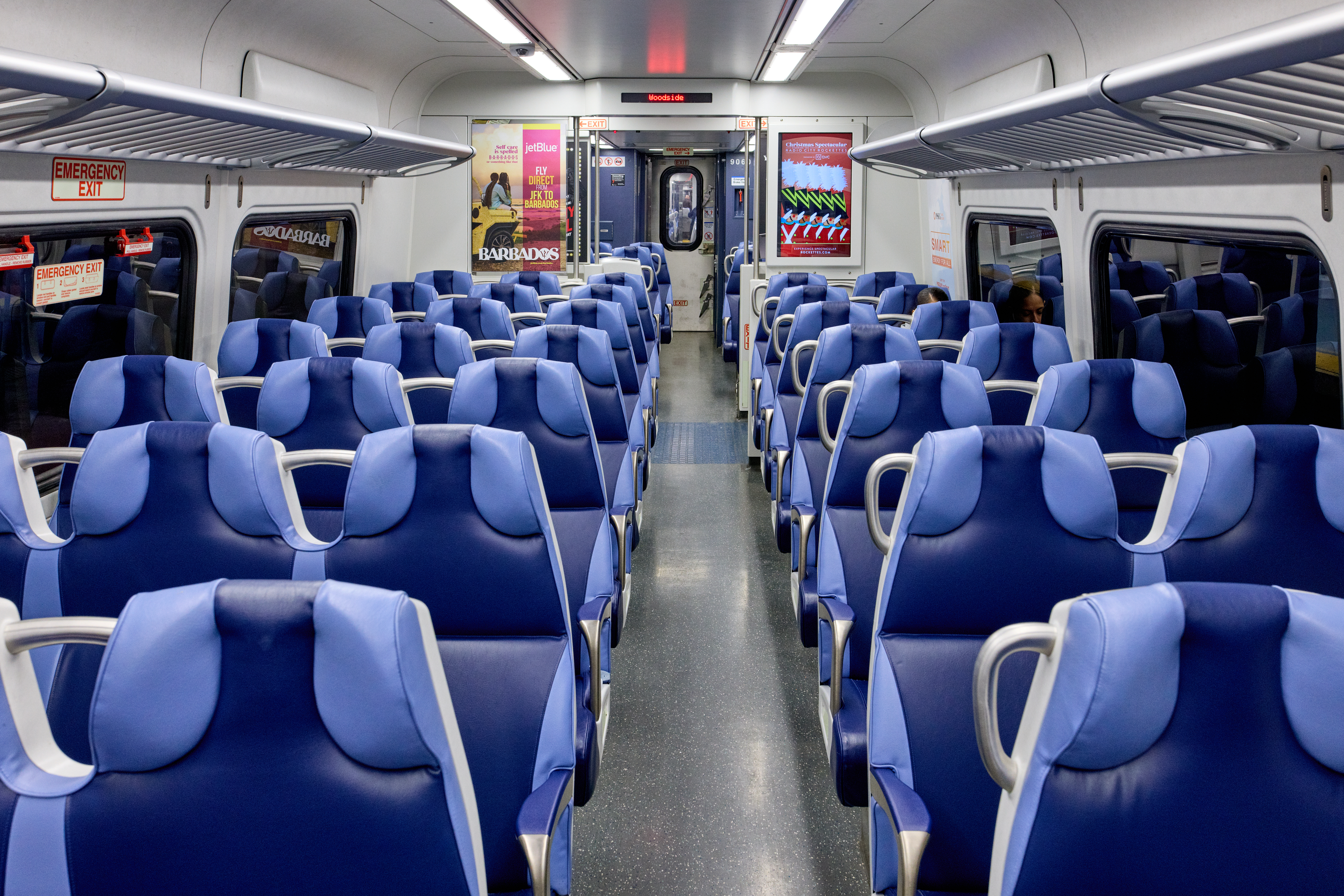
- Inside an M9 EMU
- In service: LIRR: 2019–present
- Manufacturers: M9: Kawasaki Heavy Industries; M9A: Alstom
- Built at: M9: Yonkers, New York, U.S.; Lincoln, Nebraska, U.S.; Kobe, Hyōgo, Japan; M9A: Hornell, New York, U.S.; Plattsburgh, New York, U.S.
- Family name: M-series
- Replaced: All remaining M3s and M3As.
- Constructed: M9: 2017–2024; M9A: 2025–present
- Entered service: M9: September 11, 2019
- Number under construction: M9A: 318
- Number built: M9: 202; M9A: 0
- Formation: Married pairs
- Fleet numbers: M9: LIRR: 9001–9202; M9A: LIRR: TBD MNR: TBD
- Capacity: Seated passengers: 111 (A car); 101 (B car)
- Operator: MTA (Long Island Rail Road) (Metro-North Railroad)

Specifications
- Car length: 85 ft (26 m)
- Width: 10 ft 8 in (3.25 m)
- Height: 12 ft 11.625 in (3.95 m)
- Floor height: 48 in (1,200 mm)
- Maximum speed: 100 mph (161 km/h) (design); 80 mph (129 km/h) (service)
- Traction system: M9: Mitsubishi Electric hybrid SiC-IGBT–VVVF; M9A: Alstom MITRAC IGBT–VVVF
- Traction motors: M9: 8 × 275 hp (205 kW) Mitsubishi asynchronous 3-phase AC
- Power output: 2,200 hp (1,600 kW) per unit
- Acceleration: 2 mph/s (3.2 km/(h⋅s))
- Deceleration: 3 mph/s (4.8 km/(h⋅s)) (service); 3.2 mph/s (5.1 km/(h⋅s)) (emergency)
- Electric systems: Third rail, 750 V DC
- Current collection: Contact shoe
- UIC classification: Bo′Bo′+Bo′Bo′
- AAR wheel arrangement: B-B+B-B
- Braking systems: Pneumatic, dynamic/regenerative
- Safety systems: ATC and Pulse code cab signaling
- Coupling system: Budd Pin and Cup coupler
- Track gauge: 4 ft 8 1/2 in (1,435 mm) standard gauge

The M9 is a class of electric multiple unit railroad cars being built by Kawasaki Heavy Industries for use on the MTA's Long Island Rail Road (LIRR) and Metro-North Railroad. They entered service September 11, 2019. These cars will replace the M3/M3A railcars built during the early 1980s, as well as expand the LIRR fleet to provide additional service after the completion of the LIRR's East Side Access project. A separate order of cars purchased for the LIRR and Metro-North using federal funding for the East Side Access project will also be designated M9A, these being built by Alstom.

== History ==
=== Contract timeline ===
In mid-2012, the MTA issued a joint procurement request for the LIRR and Metro-North for a total of up to 676 M9 railcars, set for delivery between 2016 and 2020. On September 18, 2013, Kawasaki Heavy Industries was awarded a nearly $1.8 billion contract for the order, comprising a base order of 92 cars for the LIRR (costing $355 million) with options for an additional 584 cars (304 for the LIRR and 280 for MNR). Funding for the 92-car base order was included in the MTA's 2010-2014 Capital Plan, with funding for the rest of the order included in the 2015–2019 and future capital plans. In July 2014, the MTA forecast a need of 416 M9 and M9A cars for the LIRR (180 cars to replace the M3 fleet and 236 cars for East Side Access-related increases) and up to 188 M9 cars for Metro-North, for a total order of 604 cars. Of the 416 cars ordered for the LIRR, 160 would be M9A cars, a separate order to be paid for with federal funding from the Federal Transit Administration under the East Side Access project. The MTA issued a request for proposals for 60–160 M9A cars in December 2017.

In June 2018, Metro-North announced that they would elect to not exercise their options for the M9 order, instead overhauling their M3A units to extend their lifespan. However, that November, Metro-North stated that they were "working with LIRR to procure new M9A cars in the next Capital Program to provide additional capacity and to replace their existing M3s."

By October 2017, car production was delayed again as the 92-car base order was now scheduled for delivery between July 2018 and March 2019, at a cost of $393 million. Construction delays in the East Side Access project meant that delivery of M9 and M9A railcars intended for use on that line had been deferred. An M9 trainset was delivered to Pueblo for testing in 2017, but LIRR field tests had been pushed back to April 2018. Because of continuing delays, the Long Island Railroad planned to rebuild, and keep at least 80 to 100 M3 cars in service through at least 2024.

By June 2016, the M9 cars that were ordered for the LIRR were expected to be delivered starting in November 2018.

In June 2025, the MTA indicated that it would consider awarding a $2.3 billion contract for 316 M9A cars to Alstom. If approved, these would be divided into 156 cars for Metro-North and 160 for the LIRR. The MTA officially awarded the M9A contract to Alstom on June 23.

=== Delivery schedule ===
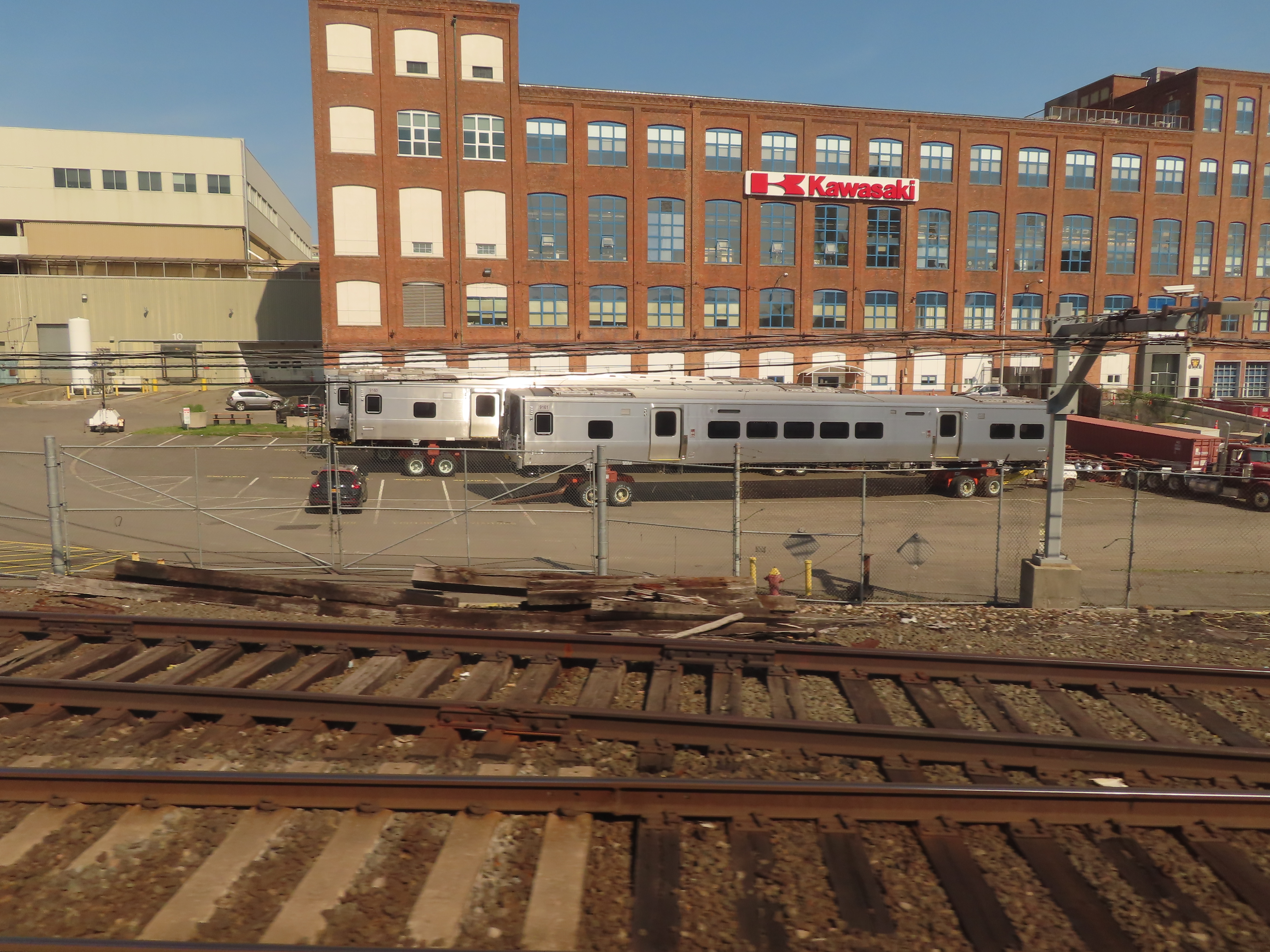
M9 shells at the Kawasaki plant in Yonkers in May 2021

The 416 cars of the LIRR's M9/M9A order is split into four parts. In July 2014, the delivery schedule was as follows: 92 base order cars (to be completed by April 2018) and 88 option 1 cars (to be completed by November 2018) to replace the M3 fleet as well as 76 option order cars (to be completed by August 2020) and 160 M9A cars (to be completed by October 2021) to be used for East Side Access service increases. 14 pilot cars were to be delivered September 2016 for testing, with the production cars being delivered at a rate of 12 cars per month. The balance of 188 cars for Metro-North was expected to begin delivery in December 2018 and be completed February 2020.

By October 2016, the MTA forecast ordering 140–170 cars for Metro-North, which would bring the total size of the M9/M9A order to a maximum of 586 cars. The production of the base order had suffered delays, and the first eight-car pilot train was now scheduled for testing at the Transportation Technology Center (TTC) facility in Pueblo, Colorado from June to August 2017, with the first fourteen-car pilot train on the LIRR was scheduled for testing from October to December 2017. The 92-car base order was now scheduled for delivery between June 2018 and January 2019. The first four M9s were delivered from the TTCI facility to the LIRR in mid-2018.

The M9s began testing on June 12, 2018, and were expected to go into service by the end of May 2019. However, a variety of issues or bugs were found on the cars, delaying debut for additional weeks, until all of these issues or bugs have been resolved or ironed-out. The cars in the original base order were expected to be completed in January 2020. The first 8-car set of M9s entered service on September 11, 2019, on the Port Jefferson Branch.

As of May 2021, there were 74 cars in revenue service. The timeline for delivery of the base and option orders had been pushed back to October 2022. The original timeline had been delayed by 13 months due to defects found in on-site testing, as well as the onset of the COVID-19 pandemic in 2020. As of June 2021, the LIRR had taken delivery of all 92 cars of the base order. In addition, 16 option cars were being tested on the LIRR system, 24 were being tested at Arch Street Shop, and 26 were being assembled in Kawasaki's Yonkers plant. The LIRR had identified numerous defective components that Kawasaki had to fix. At the time, the MTA's Capital Program Oversight Committee reported that the 110 option cars were projected to be delivered by April 2022; this timeline was unchanged from a report in January 2020. By May 2023, the M9 order was not scheduled to be complete until that December; this date was later pushed back to May 2024. As a result, some riders began colloquially referring to the M9 cars as "unicorns", since they comprised less than 5% of the LIRR's fleet as late as 2022. The last M9 cars were delivered in mid-May 2024. On April 17, 2025, car 9157 was damaged in a railroad crossing accident near Pinelawn station.

== Features ==
The M9s and M9As are equipped with numerous customer amenity improvements over their predecessors. The cars are equipped with wider seats, closed loop seat armrests similar to those on the M8s, electrical outlets on both sides of the car in each row of seats, four 32-inch multimedia screens in each car, four to six additional seats per married pair, and powered doors on the "B" end of each car. The flip-up seats are equipped with a suspension system to prevent them from slamming. All M9s will be equipped with positive train control (PTC) and CCTV cameras that allow the train crew to view the passenger areas of the train.

Like the M7s and M8s, the M9s feature external public address speakers and electronic destination signs on the sides of the car, as well as automated announcements and interior LED displays that show the current station, the following station, and the train's destination. Similar to the M8s, the M9s feature additional exterior destination signs at the front and rear of the train. Furthermore, the internal and external destination signs display the car's position within a train (for example: "Car 1 of 8"), to assist passengers getting off at stations with short platforms that do not span the entire train length. There are also new automated announcements that are easier to hear and understand than those of the M7/M7A, M8, and C3 fleets.

Unlike the M9s, the M9As will feature USB ports installed in each alternating current electrical outlet, powered bathroom doors, stainless steel urinals in each bathroom, and Gorilla Glass side windows that do not haze, fade or crystallize.

== Gallery ==
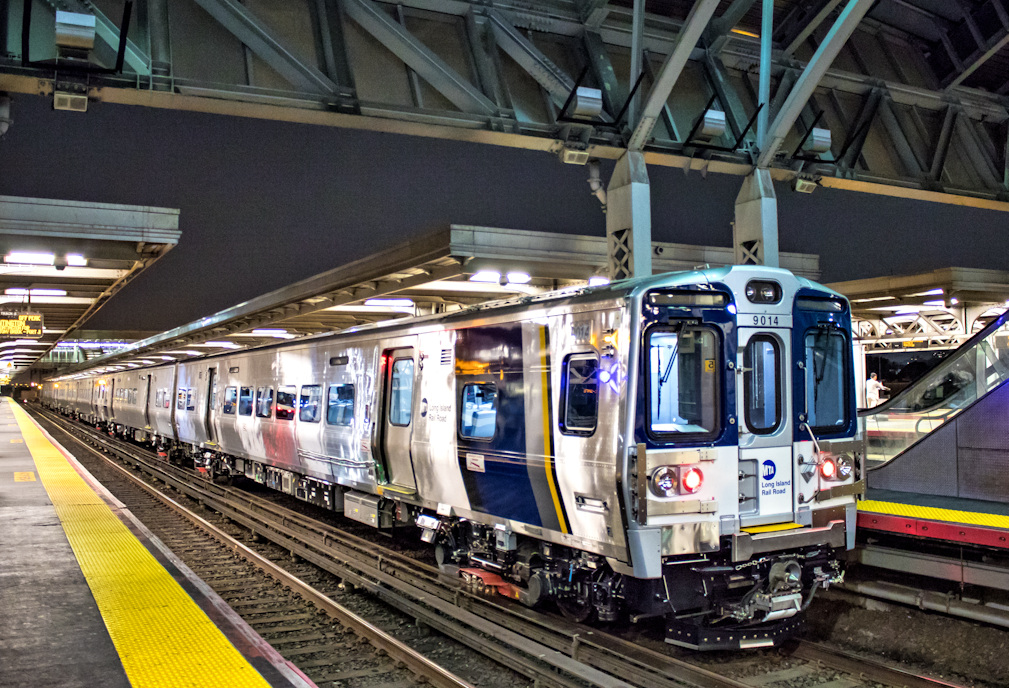
M9 train at Jamaica station

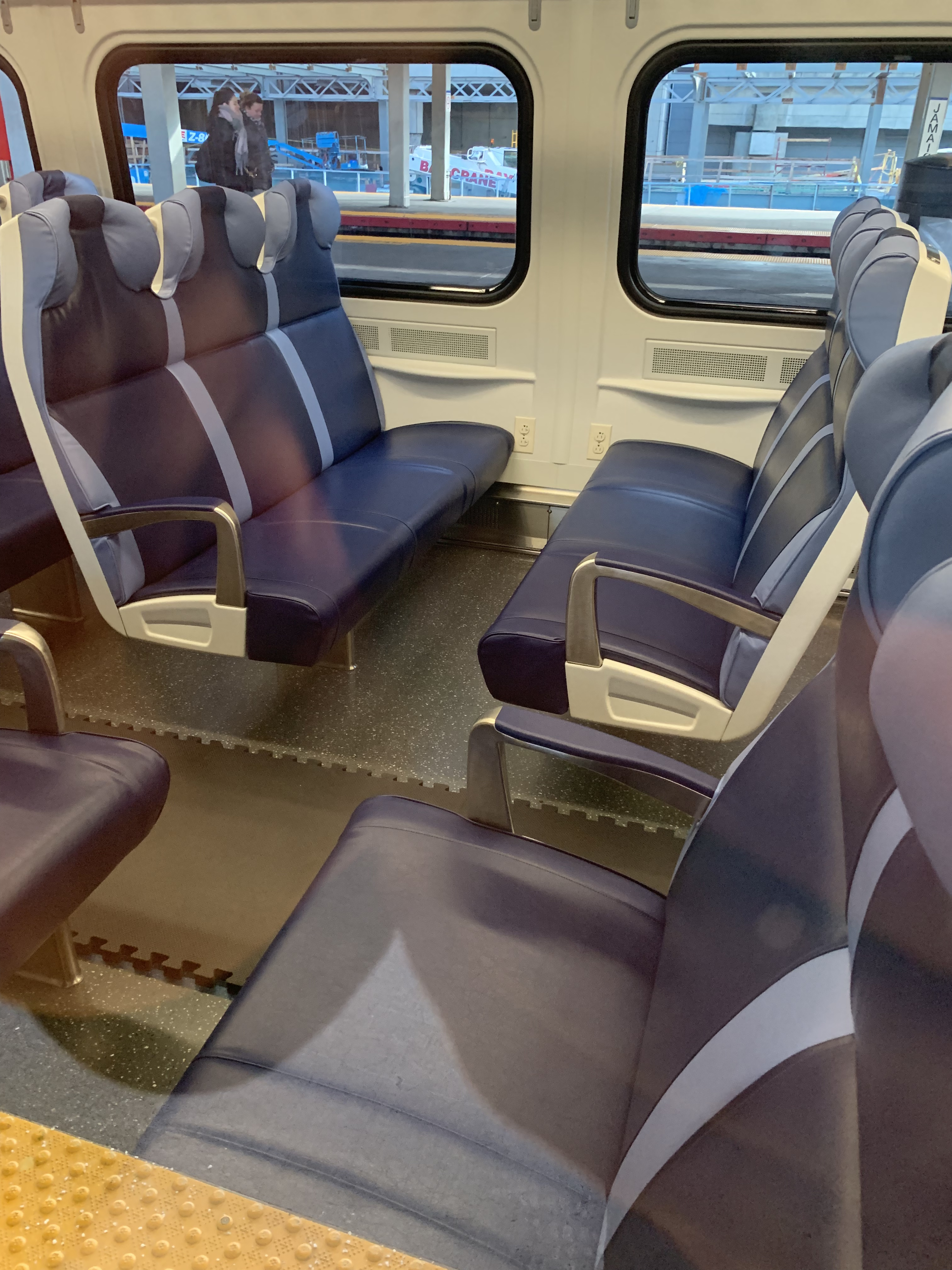
Seats and outlets in M9 cars

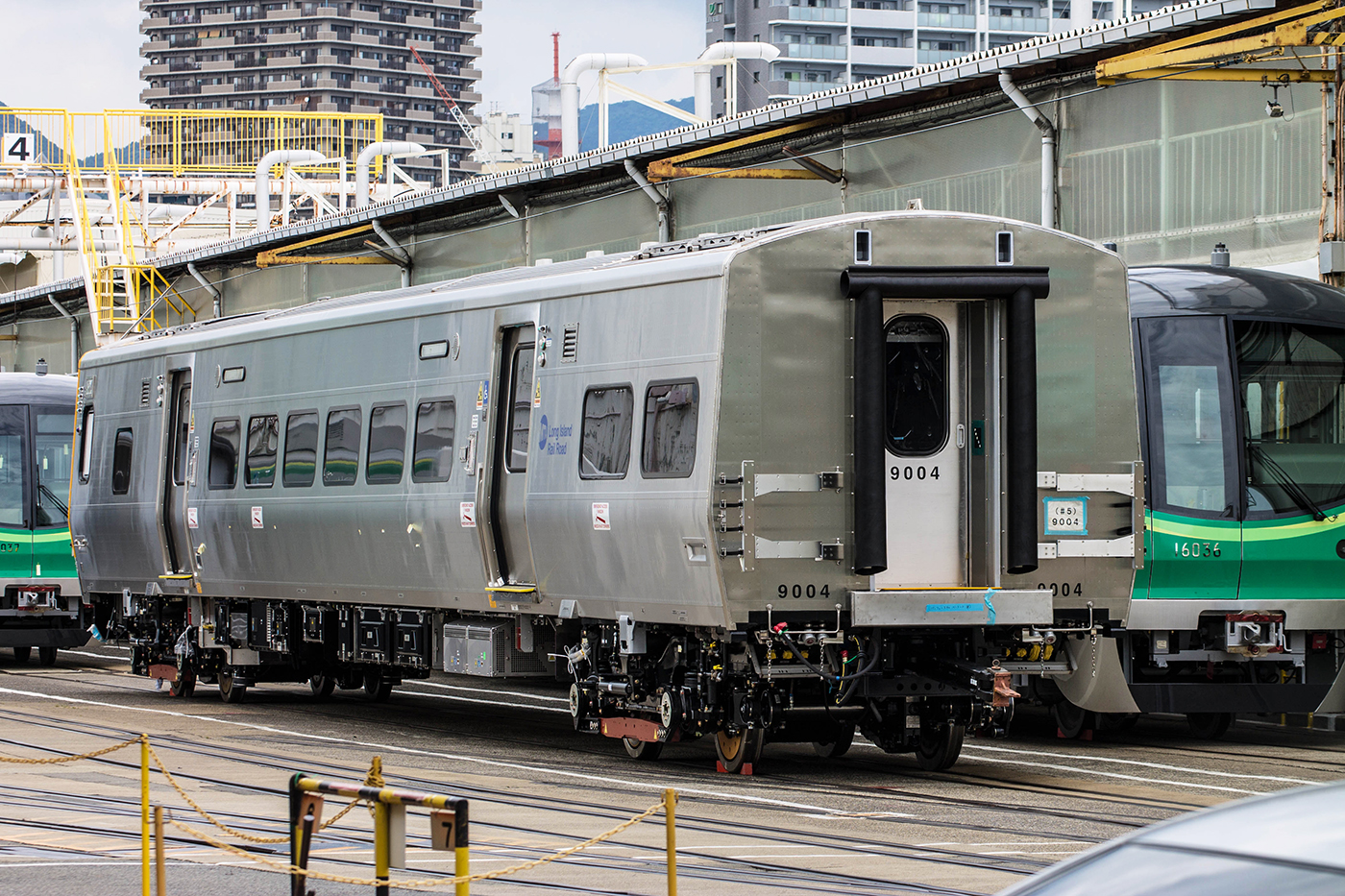
Car no. 9004 at Kawasaki Heavy Industries' Hyogo plant in 2017, in front of a Tokyo Metro 16000 series

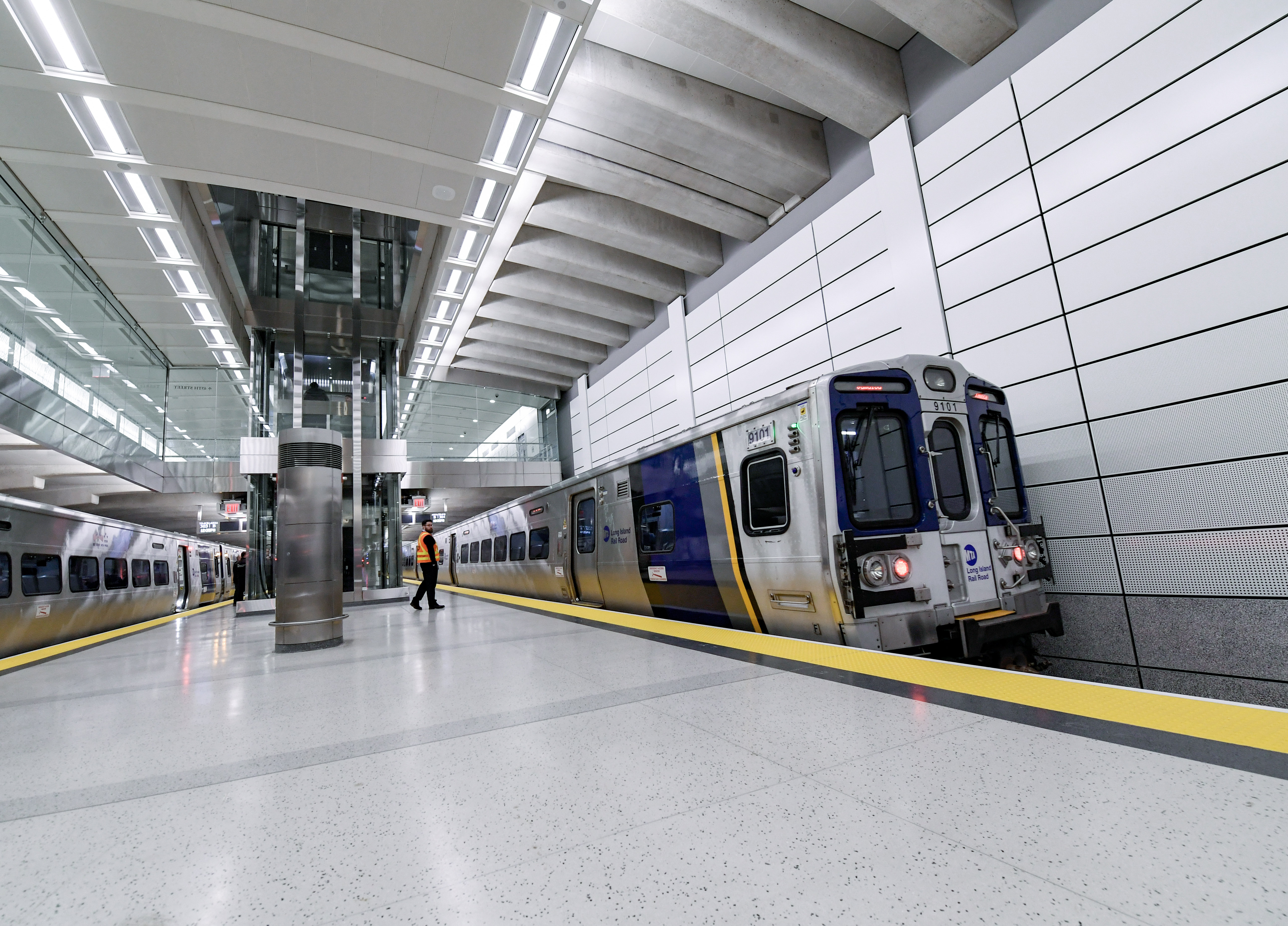
M9's running exclusive shuttle service on the opening day of Grand Central Madison
