= M1/M3 (railcar) =

Long Island Rail Road and Metro-North car

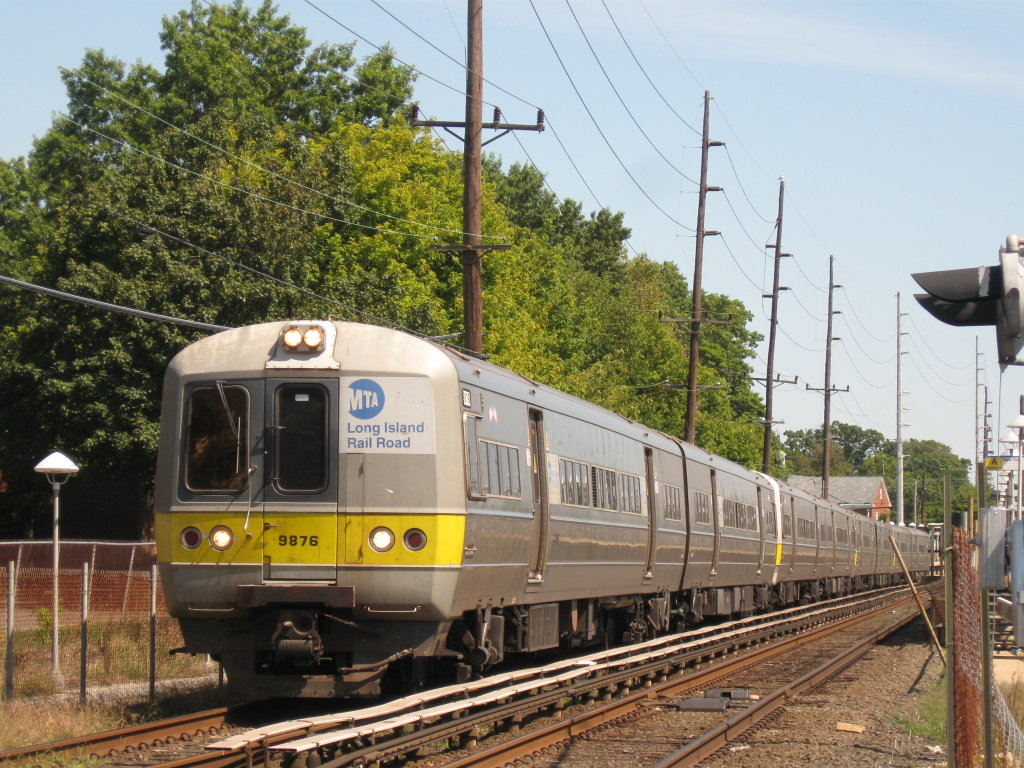
- An M3 on the Long Island Rail Road at Cedarhurst in 2008

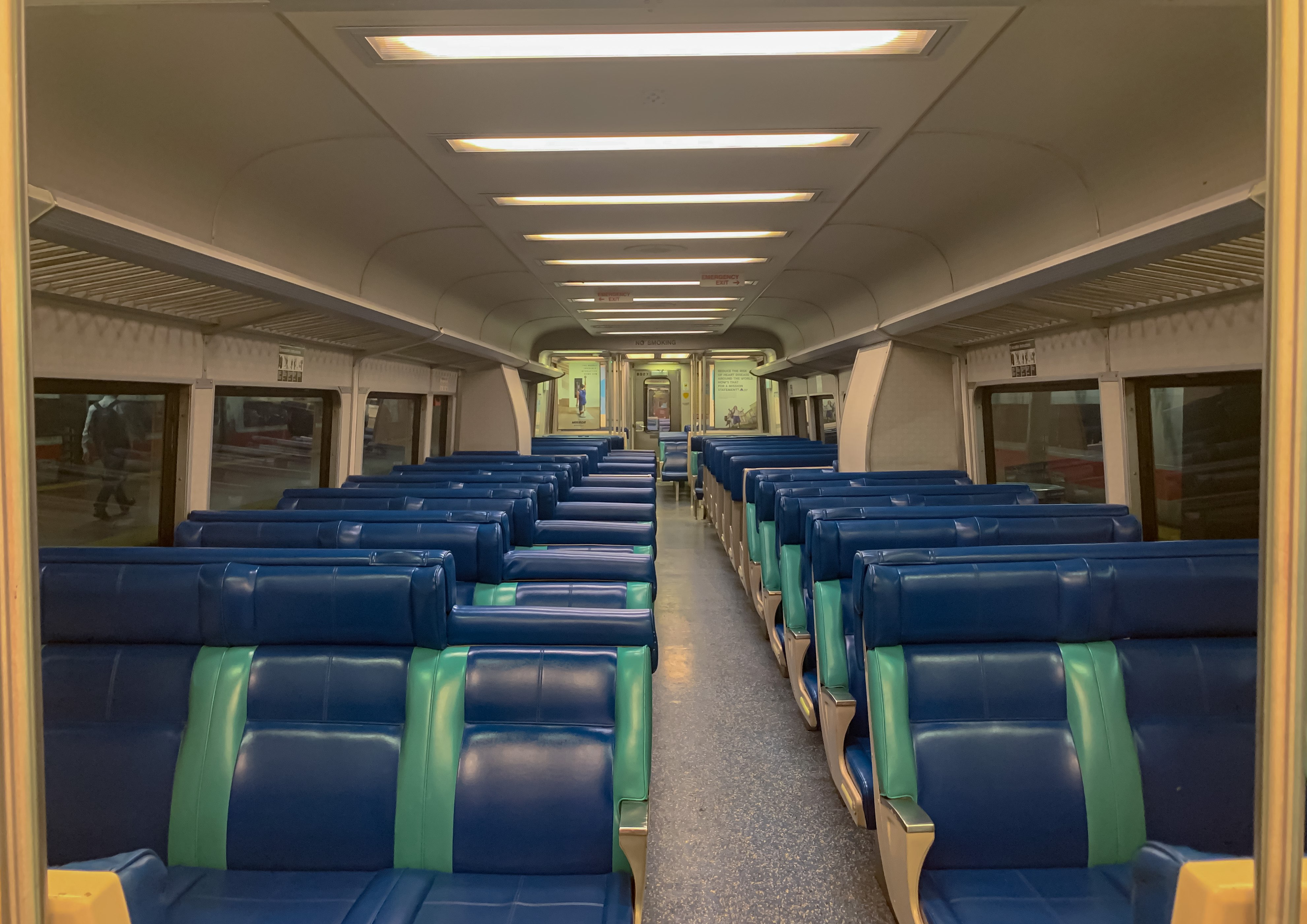
- Interior of an MNRR M3A
- In service: M1: 1968–2007; M1A: 1971–2009; M3: 1984–present; M3A: 1984–present
- Manufacturer: Budd Company
- Built at: Red Lion Assembly Plant; Northeast Philadelphia, PA
- Family name: Budd Metropolitan
- Constructed: M1/M1A: 1968–1973; M3/M3A: 1984–1986
- Entered service: M1: 1968; M1A: 1971; M3: 1984; M3A: 1984
- Scrapped: M1: 2007; M1A: 2009; M3: 2018–present; M3A: TBA
- Number built: 1264: M1: 770; M1A: 178; M3: 174; M3A: 142
- Number in service: M3: 90 (+6 in work service); M3A: 122
- Number preserved: M1: 4; M3: 3; M3A: 4
- Number scrapped: 1016: M1: 766; M1A: 178; M3: 66; M3A: 16
- Formation: Married Pair
- Fleet numbers: M1: 9001–9770; M1A: 8200–8377; M3: 9771–9890, 9893–9946; M3A: 8000–8141
- Capacity: 120 (M3)
- Operators: Long Island Rail Road; Penn Central; Conrail; Metro-North Railroad

Specifications
- Car body construction: Stainless Steel, with fiberglass end caps on the operating ends
- Train length: 170 ft (51.82 m) - 1,020 ft (310.90 m)
- Car length: 85 ft (25.91 m)
- Width: 10 ft 6 in (3,200 mm)
- Height: 13 ft (3,962 mm) excluding rooftop horns
- Floor height: 4 ft (1,219 mm)
- Platform height: 4 ft (1,219 mm)
- Doors: Quarter point, double leaf automatic
- Maximum speed: 100 mph (160 km/h) design 80 mph (130 km/h) service
- Traction system: DC camshaft resistance control (GE)
- Traction motors: M1/M1A: 4 × 148 hp (110 kW) GE 1255 A2 DC motor M3/M3A: 4 × 160 hp (120 kW) GE 1261 DC motor
- Power output: M1/M1A: 592 hp (441 kW); M3/M3A: 640 hp (480 kW)
- HVAC: electric heat, air conditioning
- Electric systems: 650–750 V DC third rail
- Current collection: Contact shoe
- UIC classification: Bo′Bo′+Bo′Bo′
- AAR wheel arrangement: B-B+B-B
- Bogies: M1: Budd Pioneer; M3: General Steel GSI 70
- Braking systems: Pneumatic, dynamic
- Safety systems: ATC (ATO) and Pulse code cab signaling
- Coupling system: WABCO Model N-2
- Headlight type: Halogen light bulbs
- Track gauge: 4 ft 8 1/2 in (1,435 mm) standard gauge

The M1 and M3 are two similar series of electric multiple unit rail cars built by the Budd Company for the Long Island Rail Road, the Metro-North Railroad, and Metro-North's predecessors, Penn Central and Conrail. Originally branded by Budd as Metropolitans, the cars are more popularly known under their model names, M1 (late 1960s/early 1970s cars) and M3 (mid-1980s cars). The Metro-North cars were branded under the M1A and M3A series.

== Overview ==
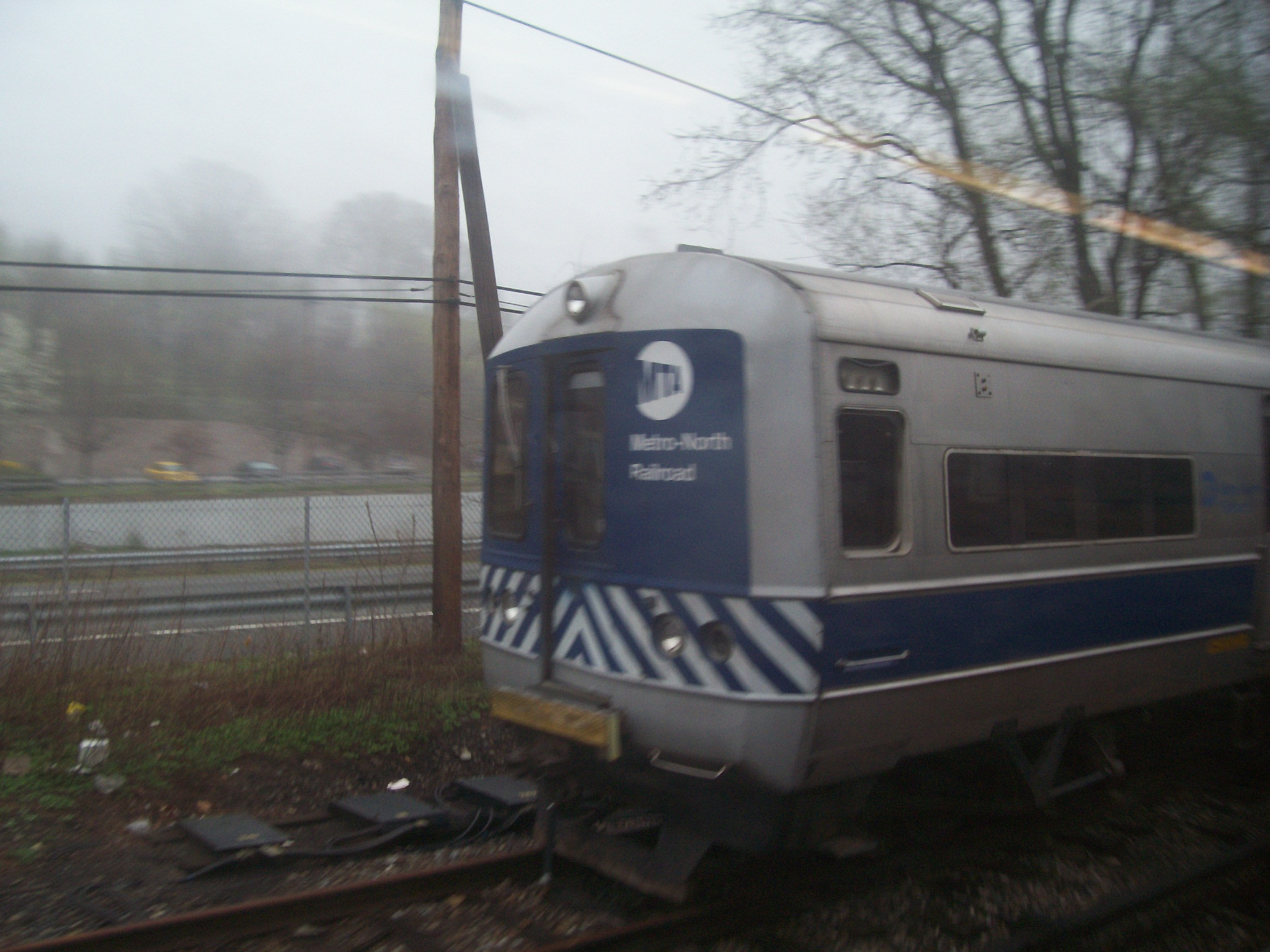
A then-recently-retired Metro-North M1A on the unpowered siding at Harmon Shops, in April 2006

Even though the LIRR's fleet of some 900 MP54 electric MU cars constructed between 1908 and 1930 had been augmented between 1955 and 1963 by about 150 newer MP72 and MP75 EMUs, the roster still contained a large number of increasingly elderly pre-war cars, which the cash-strapped LIRR was unable to replace. In 1965, the nearly bankrupt commuter railroad was taken over by the state-owned Metropolitan Commuter Transportation Authority (later renamed the Metropolitan Transportation Authority in 1968), which was then able to provide large amounts of capital funding to bring the system to a state of good repair. One of the first items on the list was a massive order of brand new self-propelled electric railcars that could replace the remaining MP54s and provide modern levels of comfort and performance.

The Metropolitans, at the time of their introduction, were notable for their rounded ends and quarter-point sliding doors. The cars were fully air conditioned, accommodated only high-level boarding, used lightweight construction, and were built with a top speed of 100 mph (161 km/h) and support for Automatic Train Operation. The Metropolitan cars were also the catalyst of change for their respective systems as the high-level boarding required all stations in the electrified zone to be rebuilt between 1966 and 1968, and the increased power demand forced the LIRR to update its third rail power supply from 650 V DC to 750 V DC to take advantage of the car's performance. On December 30, 1968, the M1s went into revenue service, with the first revenue train being an 8-car local from Babylon to Penn Station.

The Metropolitans blurred the line between traditional commuter rail and rapid transit, with the later R44 and R46 series of cars for the sister New York City Subway adopting many of their design elements. Compared to the older cars with their drop sash windows, slow speeds, rough suspension, and growling gearboxes, the Metropolitans ushered in a new era of commuting in the New York region.

== M1/M1A series ==
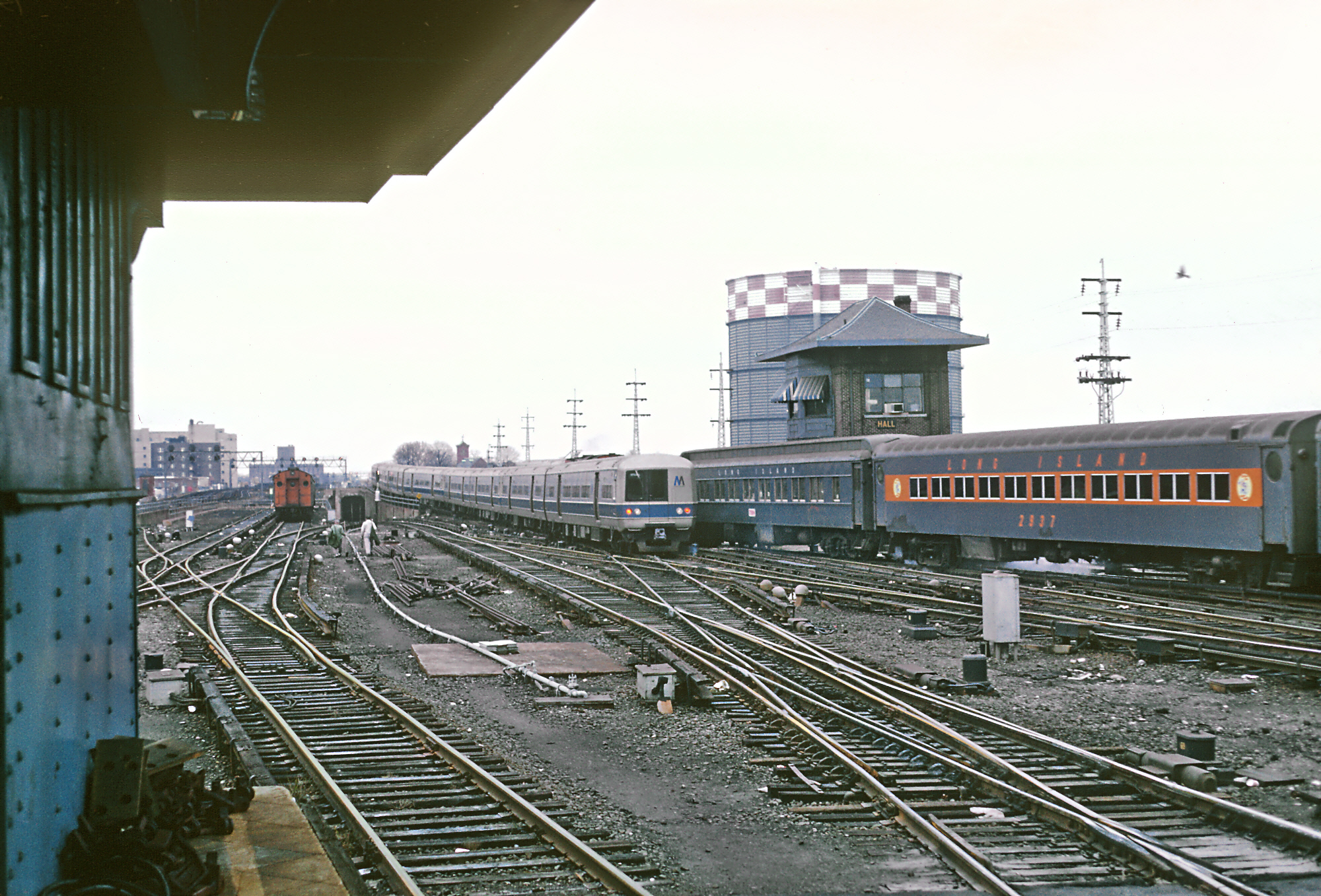
M1 cars at Jamaica station in 1969

The M1 series were funded by both New York State and the then-fledgling Metropolitan Transportation Authority, which gained operation of the lines partway through the order. The 770 M1s (9001–9770) built for the LIRR between 1968 and 1973 represented the largest single order of electric multiple units in North America up until that time. 620 cars were in the base order from 1968–71, with 150 option cars following in 1973. In addition, 178 M1As (8200–8377) were built for the former New York Central commuter operations from 1971 and 1973, allowing the railroad to replace its remaining pre-war MU cars and the 100 4500 series ACMUs (which were in need of a 20-year overhaul). Using Budd Pioneer III trucks and powered by four 148 horsepower (110 kW) GE 1255 A2 traction motors, each car had 592 horsepower (441 kW). They were designed to achieve 100 mph (161 km/h) running in service, achieving only 80 mph (129 km/h) in service due to track and signaling limitations. The LIRR cars also featured support for Automatic Train Operation, although this, too, was never seen in service.

== M3/M3A series ==
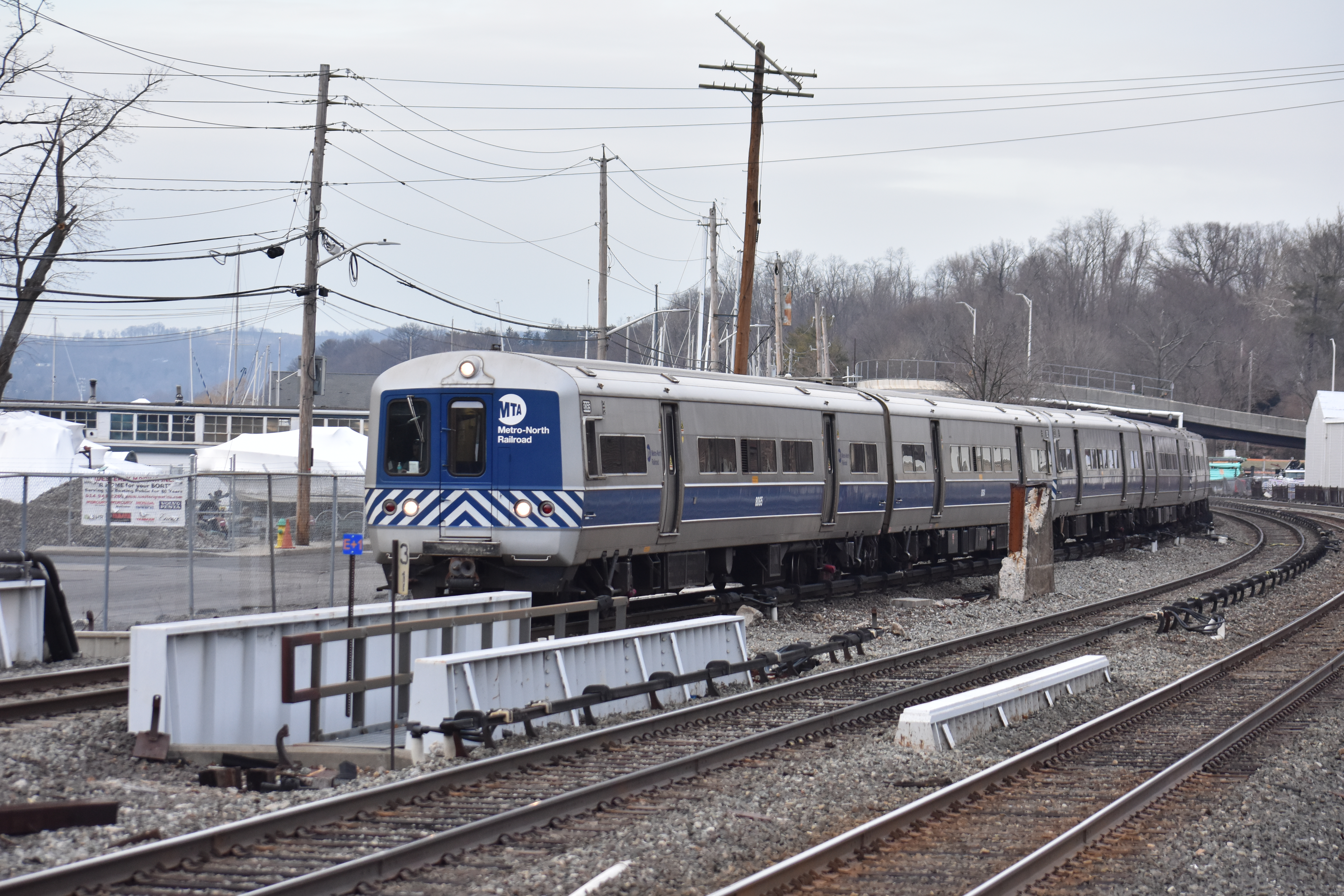
A Metro-North M3A train entering Ossining on the Hudson line

With electrification areas of both railroads expanding, the MTA placed an order for another series in 1982, the M3 series. Essentially compatible with, and (on the exterior) very similar to, the M1 series, the M3s had updated mechanical elements, such as the use of General Steel GSI 70 trucks and a few other small differences. Traction motor cooling was added to the M3 at the cost of added weight which was compensated for by the use of more powerful 160 horsepower (120 kW) GE 1261 motors. Even with the extra power, this created different acceleration and braking rates from the M1. While LIRR chose to mix M1s and M3s in the same consist, Metro-North chose not to and would always run with uniform trainsets. A total of 174 M3s (9771–9944, with 9891 and 9892 renumbered to 9945 and 9946 after the 1993 Long Island Rail Road shooting) were produced for the LIRR between 1984 and 1986, while 142 M3As (8000–8141) were produced for Metro-North, arriving between 1984 and early 1985.

This order would be the second-to-last handled by Budd, which in April 1987, left the railroad business after taking the name Transit America, which the last M3s were produced, though their builders plates kept the Budd name.

== Refurbishment ==
With the arrival of the M3 series, the M1 and M1A cars each saw midlife rebuilds in the late 1980s in order to prolong their lives. The overhauled interiors were very similar to those of the M3s. Still, time began to take its toll on the original M1 cars, and by the end of the 20th century, the time for the cars was running short.

Some Metro-North M3As received minor interior refreshes throughout 2006/2007. The LIRR M3s, however, have remained with their original, old-fashioned interior style of wood and faux leather.

== Retirement ==
=== M1 ===
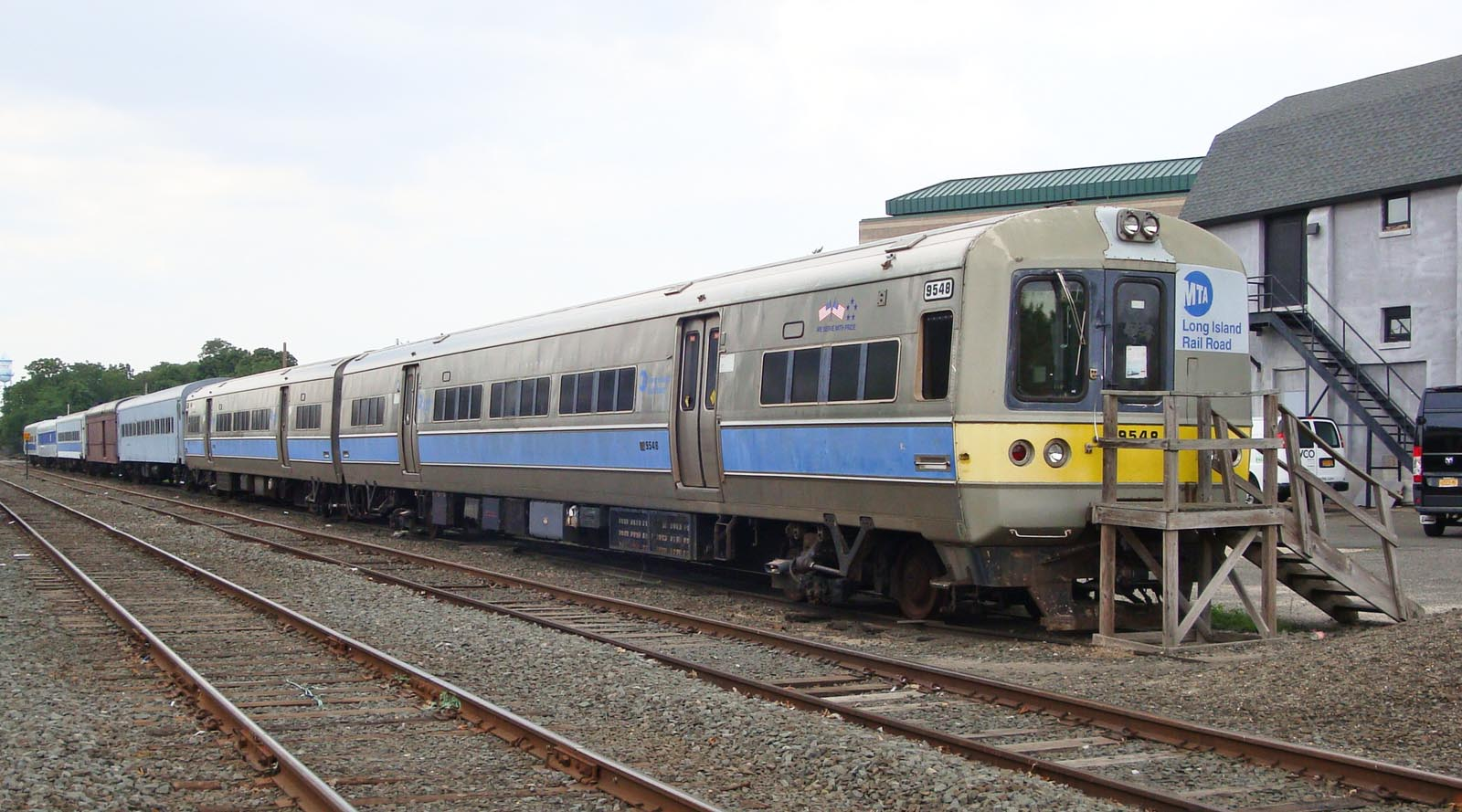
A retired LIRR M1 with other cars at the Railroad Museum of Long Island in Riverhead

In 1999, the MTA awarded Bombardier Transportation the contract to build the replacement for the M1 series, the M7 series. With the arrival of the first M7s to the LIRR in 2002 and the first M7As to Metro-North in 2004, both roads began to retire the M1 series. LIRR retired the last M1 cars in January 2007, while a small number of M1As remained in service on Metro-North until March 2009. In preparation for the retirement of the M1s, the Sunrise Trail chapter of the National Railway Historical Society hosted a "Farewell to the M1s" fan trip on November 4, 2006.

The Railroad Museum of Long Island in Riverhead, NY, has preserved M1 pair 9547–9548. Pair 9411–9412 survive as training cars at the Nassau County Fire Service Academy in Bethpage. Pair 9745–9746 was held for preservation by the New York Transit Museum and was stored around the system until May 2018, when it was taken off property for scrapping. Some cars were sold to USDOT for crash testing.

=== M3 ===
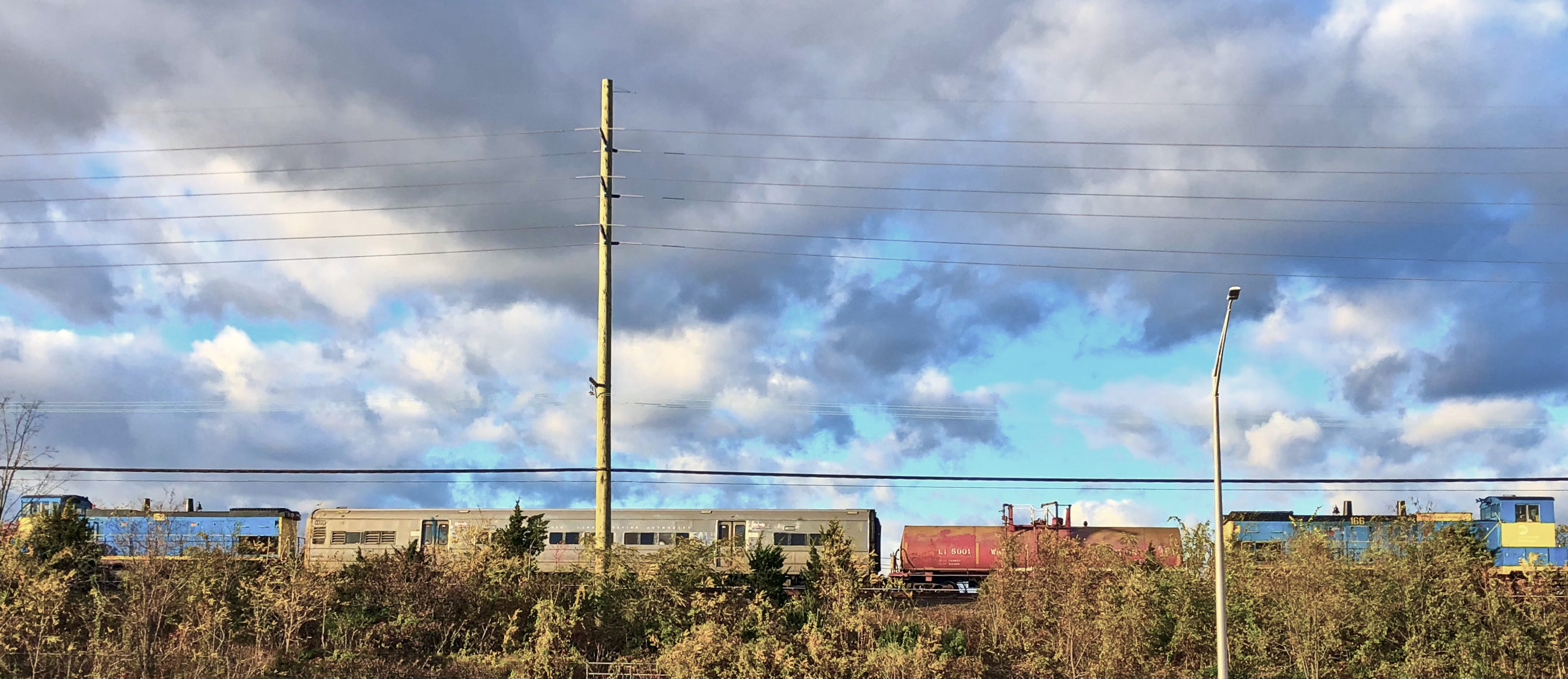
LIRR Adhesion car on the Babylon Branch

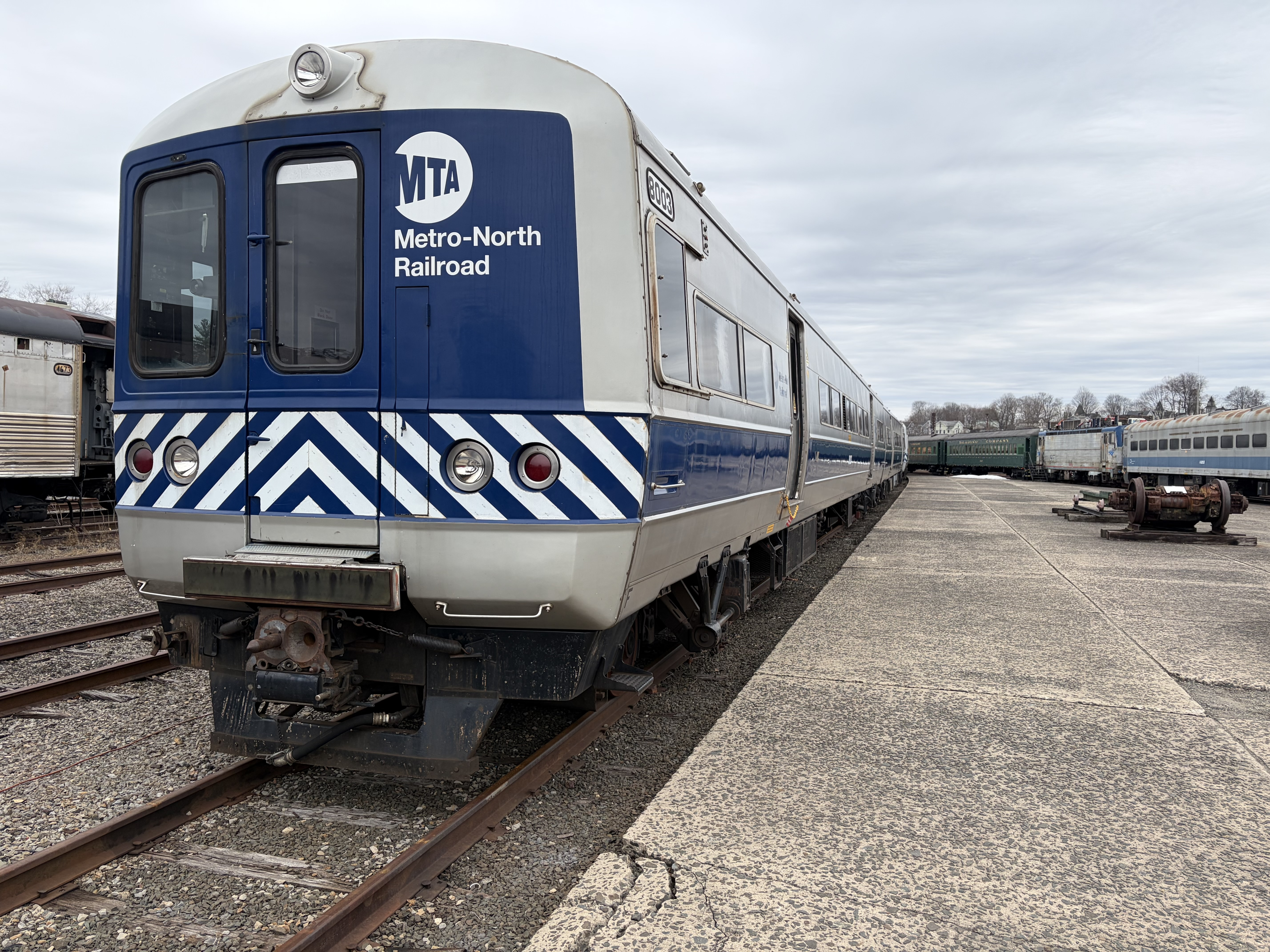
Metro North M3A Nos. 8002–8003 & 8106–8107 at the Danbury Railway Museum in Danbury

On January 22, 2013, car 9870 retired when it collided with a car at Brentwood station and then caught fire; the railcar was eventually scrapped. Its mate, 9869, was subsequently mated with 9772, which lost its mate, 9771, due to electrical failures in that car.

Between 2011 and 2013, twenty M3 cars were prematurely taken out of service and stripped of parts to keep the other cars running. They were taken off property to be scrapped in 2018.

By 2013, the MTA had spent nearly $2 billion to procure a replacement for the M3 series, the M9. The fleet is similar to the M7, and the first cars arrived in 2018. As of October 2017, there were 92 M9 cars planned, with options for up to 494 more. However, due to delays in the M9 contract, the Long Island Rail Road is keeping around 100 M3 cars in service; the cars are expected to be rebuilt to last through at least 2024. Metro-North also planned to overhaul their M3A units, but later stated that they "are working with LIRR to procure new M9A cars in the next Capital Program to provide additional capacity and replace M3s."

A handful of LIRR M3 cars were converted to rail adhesion cars for use during the autumn season, including:

- Car 9775 (now E775) – converted by 2018 to a sandite car. It was previously stored out of service in the 1990s after its mate, 9776, was wrecked in an accident and subsequently scrapped.
- Car 9869 (now E869) – converted by 2024 to a water spray car to clear fallen leaves from the rails using high-pressure water.
- Car 9899 (now E899) – converted by 2024 to a water spray car to clear fallen leaves from the rails using high-pressure water.
- Car 9901 (now E901) – converted by 2018 to a sandite car.
- Car 9902 (now E902) – converted by 2018 to a laser car. It was retrofitted with high-powered lasers from Laser Precision Solutions from the Netherlands to incinerate leaf residue.
- Car 9932 (now E932) – converted by 2018 to a laser car. It was similarly retrofitted with high-powered lasers from Laser Precision Solutions to incinerate leaf residue.

The sandite cars and wash cars are also used as de-icer cars during the winter season to keep mainline third rails free of ice buildup.

Another handful of LIRR M3 cars were donated to various training facilities, including:

- Pair 9801–9802 – donated to the Suffolk County Fire Academy in Yaphank, New York in 2018.
- Car 9794 – donated to the Nassau County Police Academy in Bethpage in 2024.

For the MTA's 2025–2029 plan, the MTA announced a plan to purchase 160 M9A cars to replace the fleet of M3s and expand the size of the LIRR's fleet.

On December 23, 2025, M3A cars 8002, 8003, 8106, and 8107 were donated to the Danbury Railway Museum.

== See also ==
- M2/M4/M6 (railcar)
- M7 (railcar)
- M8 (railcar)
- M9 (railcar)
- Budd Silverliner
