= M2/M4/M6 (railcar) =

Retired Metro-North railcar

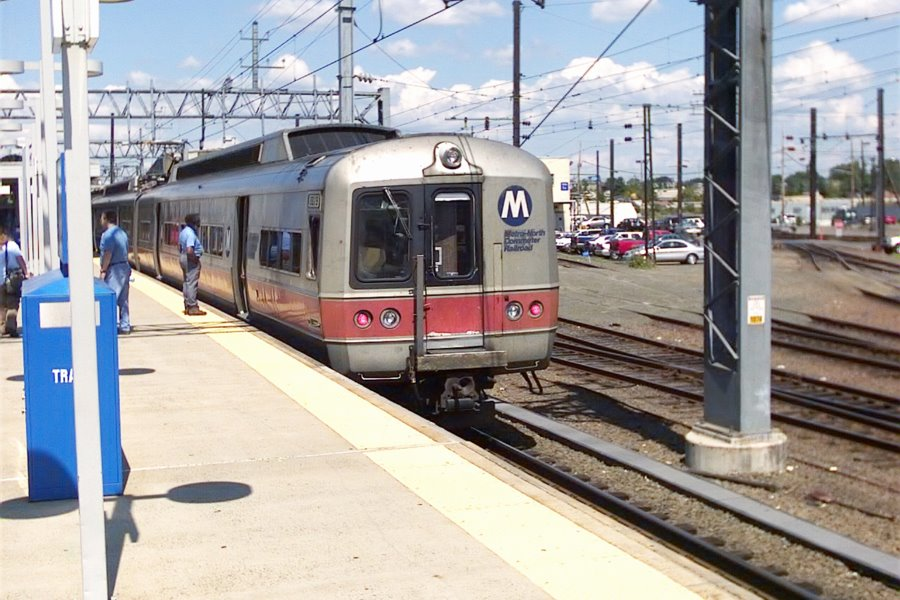
- An MTA-owned Budd M2 car at New Haven-Union Station in August 2006.
- In service: M2: April 1973–December 2018; M4: 1987–2015; M6: 1994–2015
- Manufacturers: M2: Avco, Budd, Canadian Vickers, GE; M4: Tokyu Car; M6: Morrison-Knudsen
- Built at: Erie, Pennsylvania (GE Shops)
- Family name: Budd Metropolitan
- Replaced: Kawasaki Heavy Industries M Series rail car
- Constructed: M2: 1973–1976; M4: 1987; M6: 1993–1995
- Entered service: M2: April 1973; M4: late 1987; M6: 1994
- Scrapped: 2012–2018
- Number built: M2: 244; M4: 54; M6: 48
- Number preserved: M2: 2; M6: 4 (training only)
- Number scrapped: M2: 242; M4: 54; M6: 44
- Formation: M2: Married pair; M4/M6: Triplet
- Fleet numbers: M2: 8400–8471, 8500–8571, 8650–8669, 8700–8747, 8800–8851; M4: 8900–8935, 8950–8985; M6: 9000–9031, 9050–9081
- Capacity: Seated passengers: M2: 120 (A car); 114 (B car); M4: 118 (A car); 113 (B car); 120 (D car); M6: 118 (A car); 106 (B car)
- Operators: Penn Central; Conrail; Metro-North Railroad
- Line served: New Haven Line

Specifications
- Car body construction: Stainless steel
- Train length: 170–1,020 ft (51.82–310.90 m)
- Car length: 85 ft 1 1/2 in (25,946 mm)
- Width: 10 ft 8 in (3,250 mm) max.
- Height: Rail to roof: 13 ft (3,962 mm); Rail to top of resistor grid shrouding: 14 ft 9 in (4,500 mm)
- Floor height: 4 ft 3 1/16 in (1,297 mm)
- Platform height: 4 ft (1,219 mm)
- Doors: Quarter point, double leaf automatic
- Maximum speed: Design: 100 mph (161 km/h); Service: 80 mph (129 km/h)
- Weight: M2: 112,000 lb (50,802 kg); M4 A car: 133,000 lb (60,328 kg); M4 B car: 132,000 lb (59,874 kg); M4 D car: 128,000 lb (58,060 kg)
- Axle load: 35,600 lb (16,148 kg)
- Traction system: M2: Transformed AC overhead line current fed through mercury arc Ignitron rectifiers to a camshaft resistance motor controller; Rebuilt M2/M4/M6: Transformed AC overhead line current fed through silicon rectifiers to a camshaft resistance motor controller; DC third rail current fed directly to resistance controller
- Traction motors: M2: 4 × 160 hp (119 kW) GE 1259A DC; M4: 4 × 162 hp (121 kW) GE 1259 DC
- Power output: M2: 640 hp (477 kW) @ 25 mph (40 km/h); M4: 648 hp (483 kW) @ 25 mph (40 km/h)
- Tractive effort: 10,000 lbf (44.48 kN) starting; 14,200 lbf (63.16 kN) @ 10 mph (16 km/h); 5,565 lbf (24.75 kN) @ 50 mph (80 km/h); 3,878 lbf (17.25 kN) @ 80 mph (129 km/h); 1,900 lbf (8.45 kN) @ 100 mph (161 km/h)
- Acceleration: 1.5–2 mph/s (2.4–3.2 km/(h⋅s))
- Deceleration: 3.2 mph/s (5.1 km/(h⋅s))
- HVAC: Electric heat and air conditioning
- Electric systems: Third rail, 750 V DC; Overhead line, 12.5 kV 60 Hz AC
- Current collection: Third rail: contact shoe; Overhead catenary: pantograph
- UIC classification: Bo′Bo′+Bo′Bo′
- AAR wheel arrangement: B-B+B-B
- Bogies: GSI 70
- Braking systems: Pneumatic and dynamic
- Safety systems: ATC and pulse code cab signaling
- Coupling system: WABCO Model N-2A
- Multiple working: Yes
- Track gauge: 4 ft 8 1/2 in (1,435 mm) standard gauge

The M2, M4 and M6 were three similar series of electric multiple unit rail cars produced by the Budd Company (M2), Tokyu Car Corporation (M4), and Morrison-Knudsen (M6) for the Metropolitan Transportation Authority (MTA) and the Connecticut Department of Transportation (ConnDOT). Initially branded as the Cosmopolitans, the cars were later more popularly known under their model names. They ran on the New Haven Line (then part of Penn Central, now a part of Metro-North) for most of their service life.

The M4s and M6s were retired by Metro-North in 2015, followed by the last M2s in 2018. They have been largely replaced by new M8 railcars. One pair of M2s has been preserved at the Danbury Railway Museum in Connecticut.

== M2 series ==
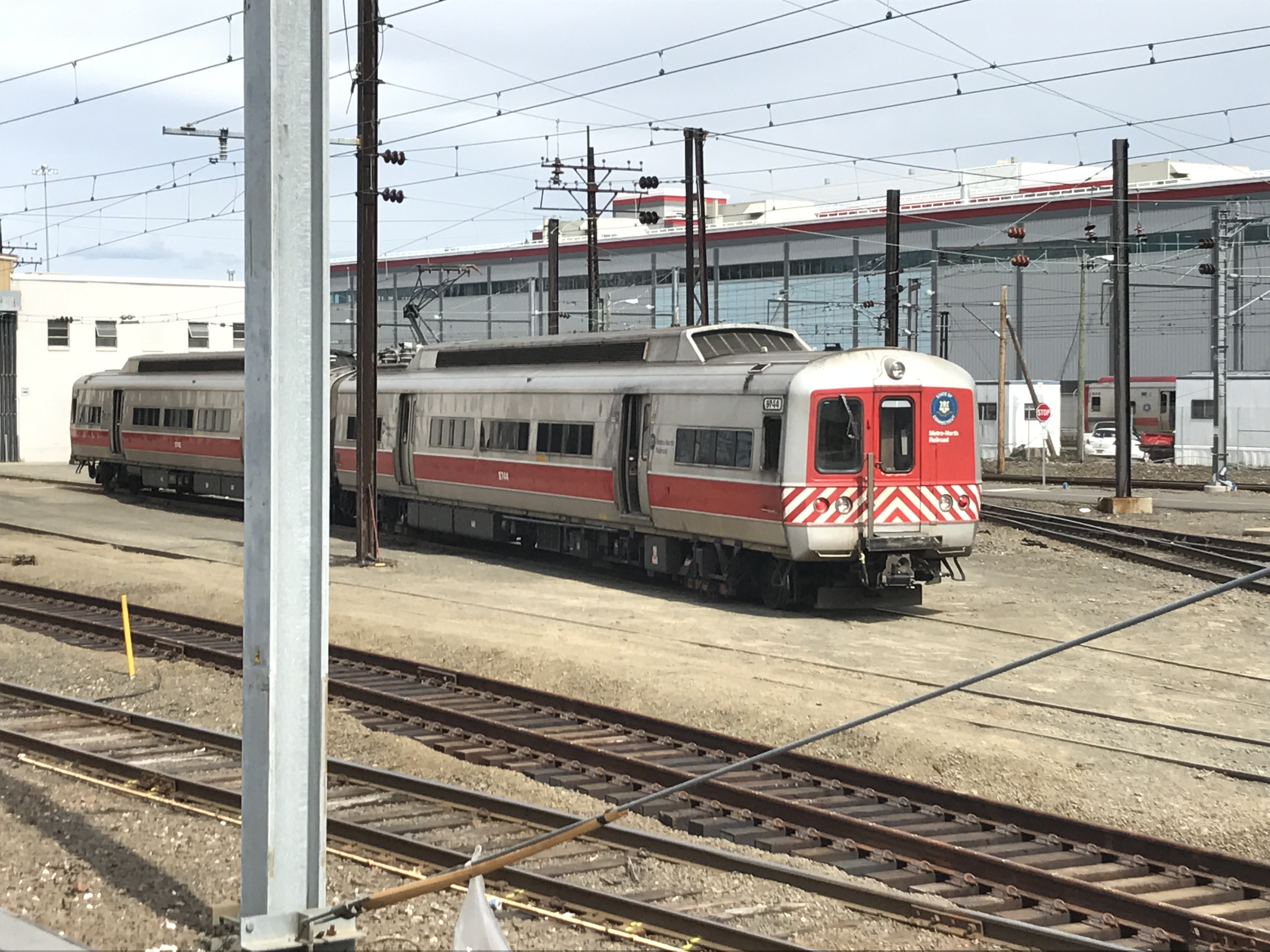
A reserve M2 in the New Haven Yard in April 2017.

The M2 cars were built by a General Electric-led consortium also including the Budd Company, Canadian Vickers, and Avco between 1972 and 1977. Final assembly of the M2 cars using bodies constructed by Budd or Vickers was completed at GE's Transportation Division in Erie, Pennsylvania. The M2 series replaced EMU cars dating from the early 1920s to 1954, including the Pullman 4400-series, which were originally manufactured for (and inherited from) the New York, New Haven & Hartford Railroad.

As with the cousin M1 series, the M2s accompanied an overhaul of the long-neglected main line and the New Canaan Branch in which longer, high level platforms were introduced along with other infrastructure improvements. The first M2s were accepted for service on April 16, 1973. 144 base order cars were built in 1972-1974, followed by a 100-car option in 1975. These cars had been scheduled for delivery in spring 1971, but were delayed due to technical problems.

Aside from the technical differences of the New Haven Line (electrification via overhead catenary instead of third rail), the cars are similar to the sister M1A order and, in times of equipment shortages or severe weather, the M2s have run on the Hudson and Harlem lines. Most of the other differences are in the interior and exterior appearance of the cars, such as red striping on the exterior rather than blue, the interior wallpaper having both the New York and Connecticut state seals and the obvious pantograph and mechanical apparatus on the roof. Both the MTA and ConnDOT purchased bar cars, but complaints from riders from stations in New York, coupled with the arrival of new equipment on the Hudson and Harlem lines, led to the conversion of the ten MTA-owned bar cars to standard coaches. The ten ConnDOT-owned bar cars, which ran on express trains to New Haven, Stamford, South Norwalk and New Canaan, remained in service during weekdays until May 2014.

48 M2s were overhauled starting in 1994, with 24 returning to service in 1995.

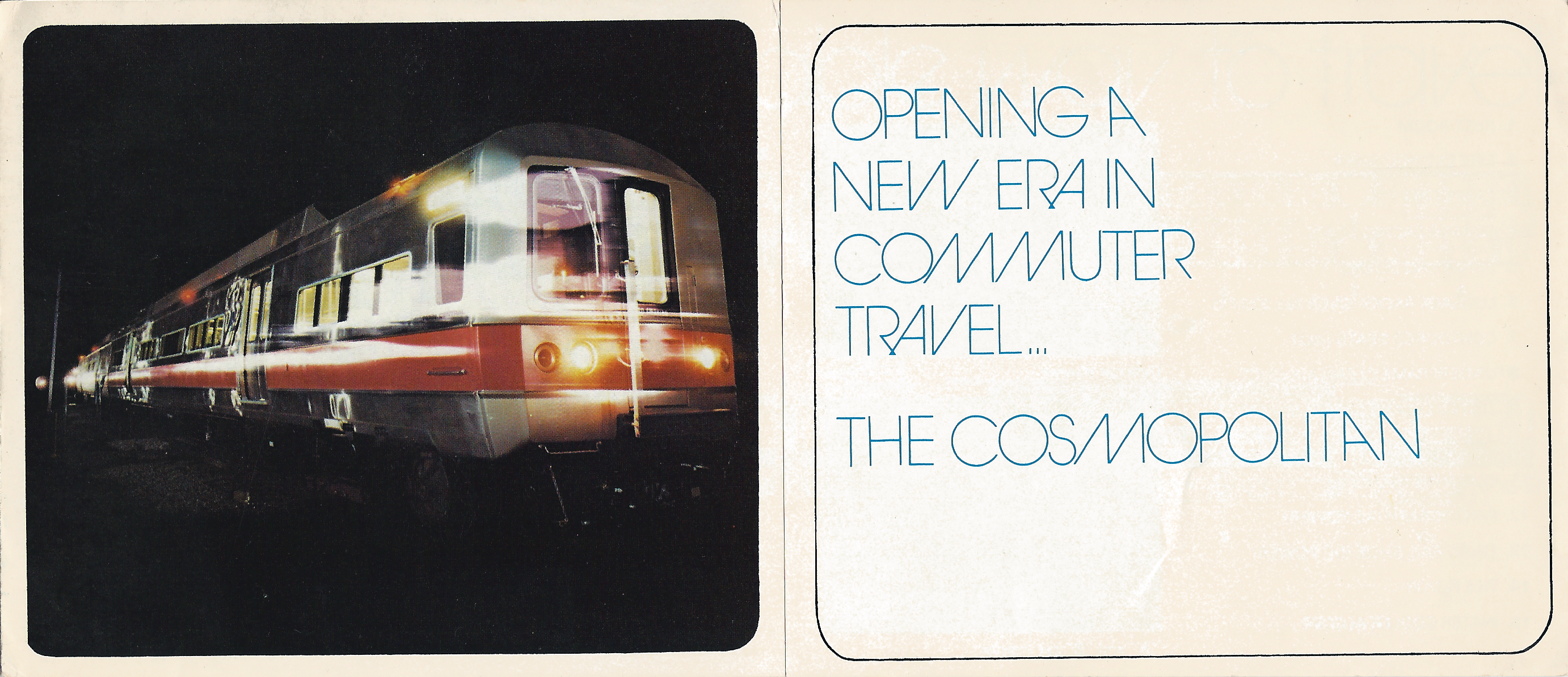
Cover of publicity booklet provided to commuters when the M2 Cosmopolitan railcars were launched, heralding a "new era in commuter travel"

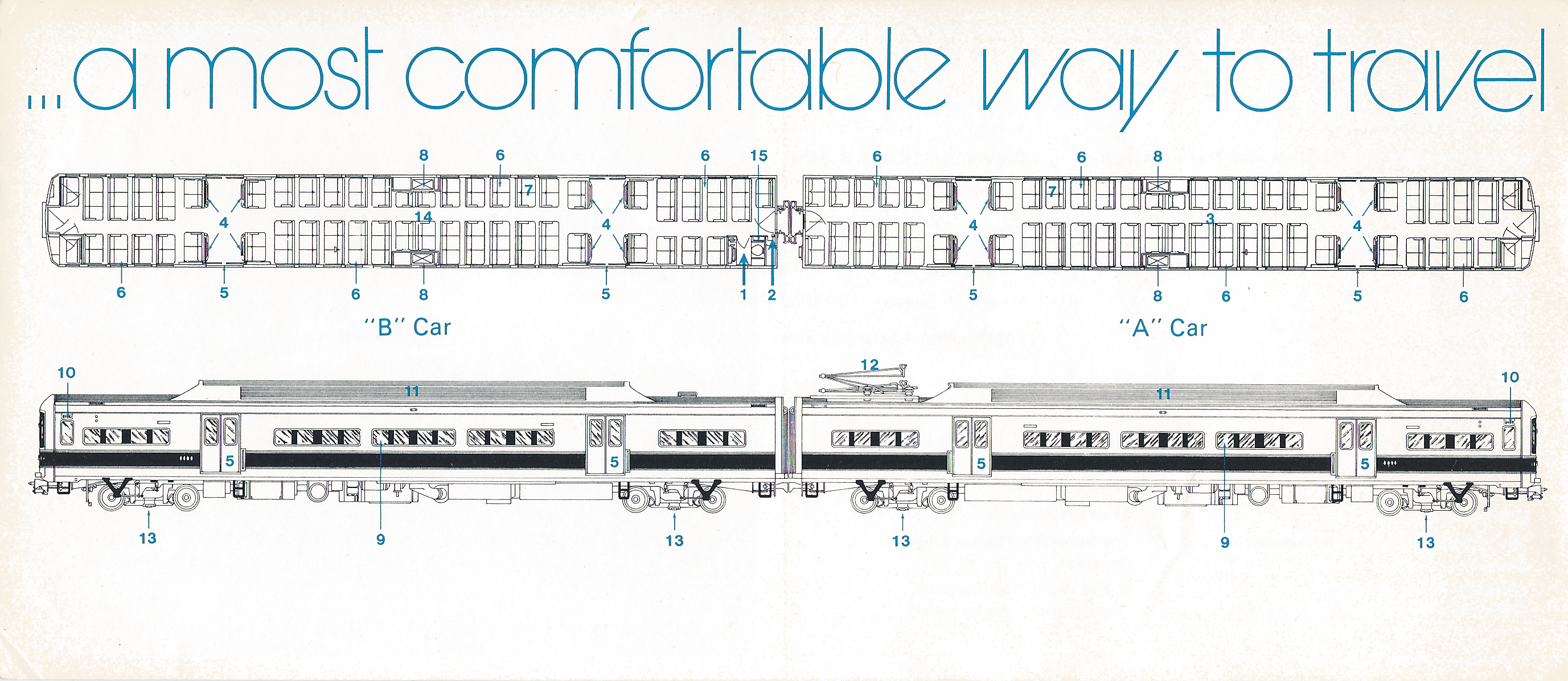
Seating plan and side profile of the M2 Cosmopolitan railcar shown in a booklet provided to commuters at the time of the car's launch

== M4 series ==
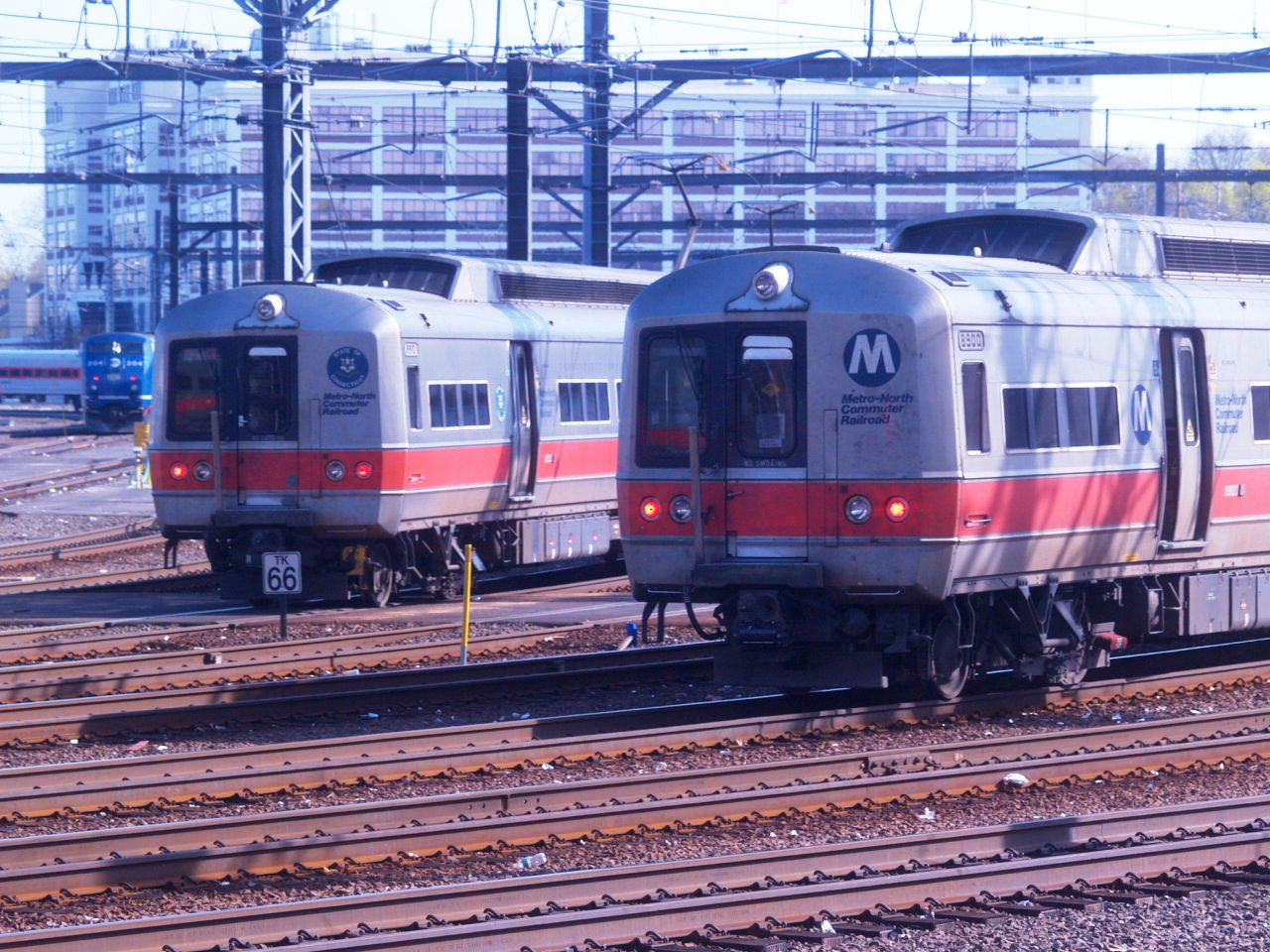
M4s in the New Haven yard

After the LIRR and Hudson/Harlem lines received an updated version of the original Metropolitan series of cars in 1984-86 (the LIRR M3 and Metro-North M3A series), plans were announced for a similar undertaking on the New Haven Line. It sought additional cars to increase service on the line after projections indicated an increase in ridership. Metro-North originally planned to purchase 44 additional M2s, but decided to award a contract for 54 M4 cars (8900-series) in 1987-1988 to Tokyu Car. The change was made due to the need to accommodate additional ridership, and because of perceived improvements the M4 model. The MTA Board approved the $77.3 million contract on December 20, 1984. These cars were built in the Brooklyn Navy Yard. Nemko assembled and finished the cars for Mitsui, which shipped the parts made by Tokyu. In October 1986, these cars had been expected to enter service the following year. The first cars were expected to arrive in early 1987.

Nearly identical to the M2s, Tokyu Car initially gave the "Triplex" brand name to the M4 cars to highlight their being a three-car set, as opposed to the married pairs of the M2s. These cars came to be known as "triplets" by railroad personnel. During the development of the order, Metro–North's operation and planning groups sought increased flexibility in the utilization of cars on the New Haven Line, and thus, decided on the triplets. The order was designed to ease maintenance and to improve reliability. The cars used fabricated bogies with air suspension, unlike previous cars in the M series.

== M6 series ==
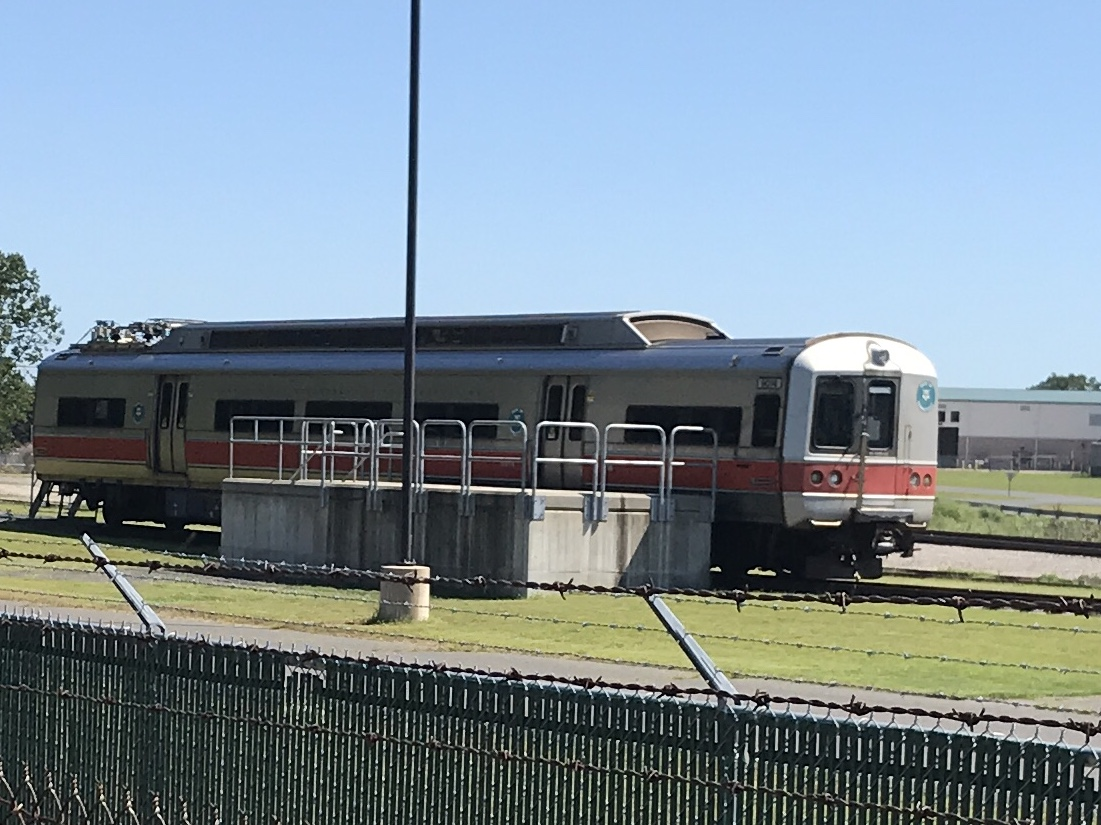
A retired M6 car, now located at the New England Disaster Training Center in Windsor Locks.

As part of the MTA's 1987 Capital Program, 60 additional M4s would have been ordered to accommodate increasing ridership. This number was revised down to 48 in its February 1989 amendment, with 30 to be purchased by CTDOT, and 18 by the MTA. The December 1990 amendment changed the car order to a separate contract, the M6 series cars. Similar to the change with the proposed purchase of M2 cars, the decision was made to purchase improved models following a reassessment of fleet requirements. The contract called for 39 cars, with an option for 9 more cars, and was awarded to Morrison-Knudsen in August 1990 for $91.5 million. Work was scheduled to begin 1991, and continue until early 1993.

Nearly identical to the M4s, these cars were completed at Hornell, New York, with body shells from Mafersa. Morrison-Knudsen was the last American builder of railcars, and heavily underbid on contracts, including on this contract, to gain a large share of the market. Morrison-Knudsen had almost no experience in the design of passenger railcars, and did not build a prototype for the M6. As a result, the first cars were rejected by Metro-North. In April 1995, the M6s were delayed by 18 months; only 12 cars were accepted in 1994, with the rest scheduled to be put into service in 1995.

The M6s featured distinctive chimes that sounded whenever the doors were closed, a feature that did not exist on the M2s or M4s. The M6s also had black framed windows, giving them the illusion of being larger than the windows on the M2s and M4s. The M6s were also commonly referred to as "triplets".

== Retirement and replacement ==
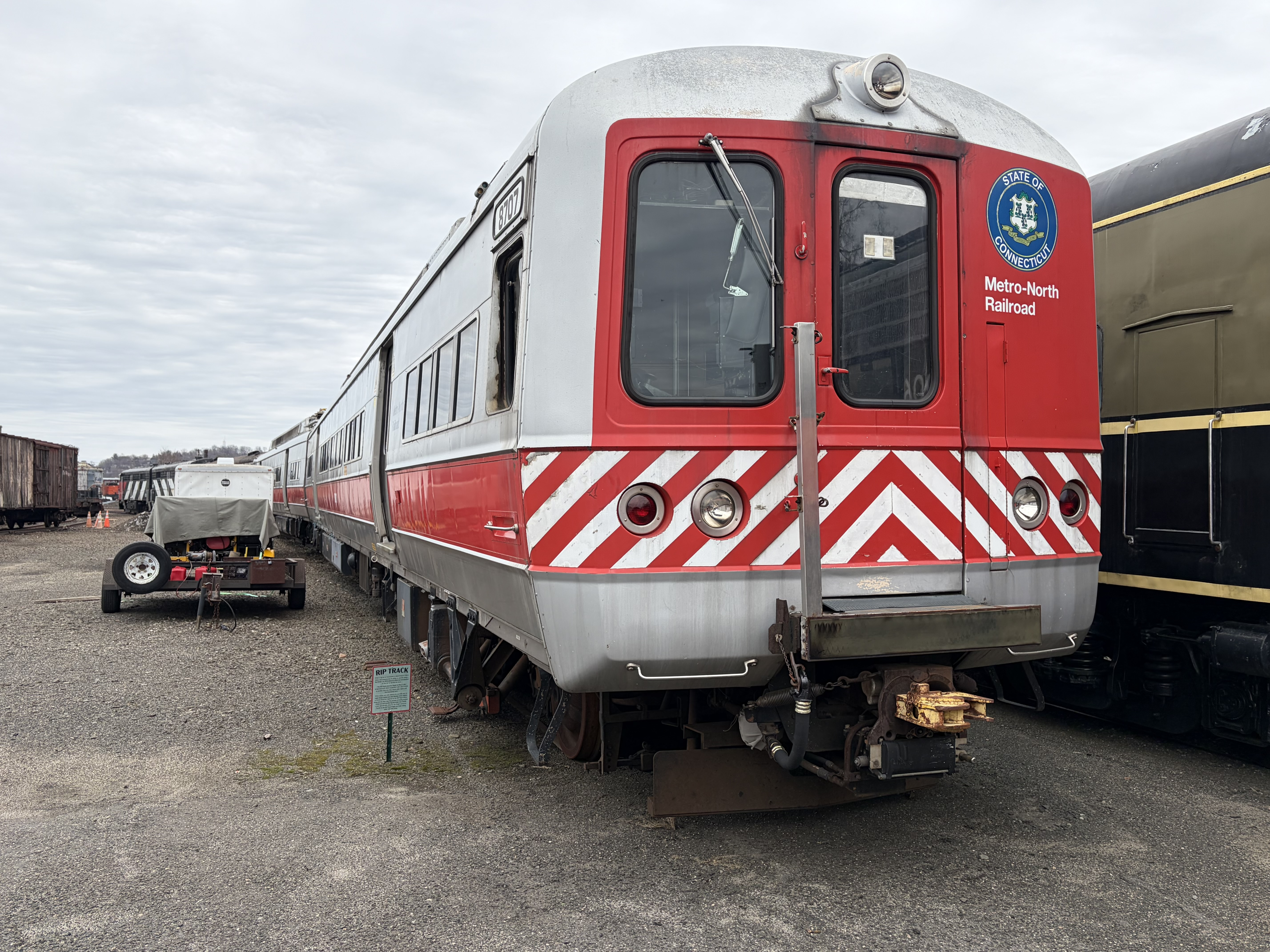
Metro North M2 car Nos. 8706-8707 at the Danbury Railway Museum

The M2s, M4s, and M6s were replaced, retired, and scrapped between 2012 and December 2018 as new M8 railcars entered service. In May 2014, Metro-North retired the bar cars, with the last one departing Grand Central Station on May 9. Since then, there have been several proposals to reintroduce bar cars by retrofitting the new M8 fleet. All M4/M6s were removed from service by July 2015. In November 2016, it was announced that the last 36 M2s would also be replaced by additional M8 cars beginning in 2019. The M2s were finally removed from service at the end of December 2018.

The Danbury Railway Museum in Danbury, Connecticut has preserved M2 pair 8706-8707. M6 cars 9014 and 9015 were donated to the New England Disaster Training Center in Windsor Locks, Connecticut. M6 cars 9030 and 9031 were donated to the MTA K9 Police Training Center and Connecticut Air National Guard in Stormville, New York, near East Fishkill.

== See also ==
- C3 (railcar)
- M1/M3 (railcar)
- M7 (railcar)
- M8 (railcar)
- New Haven Line
