= M8 (railcar) =

Rail car operating in the Northeast U.S.

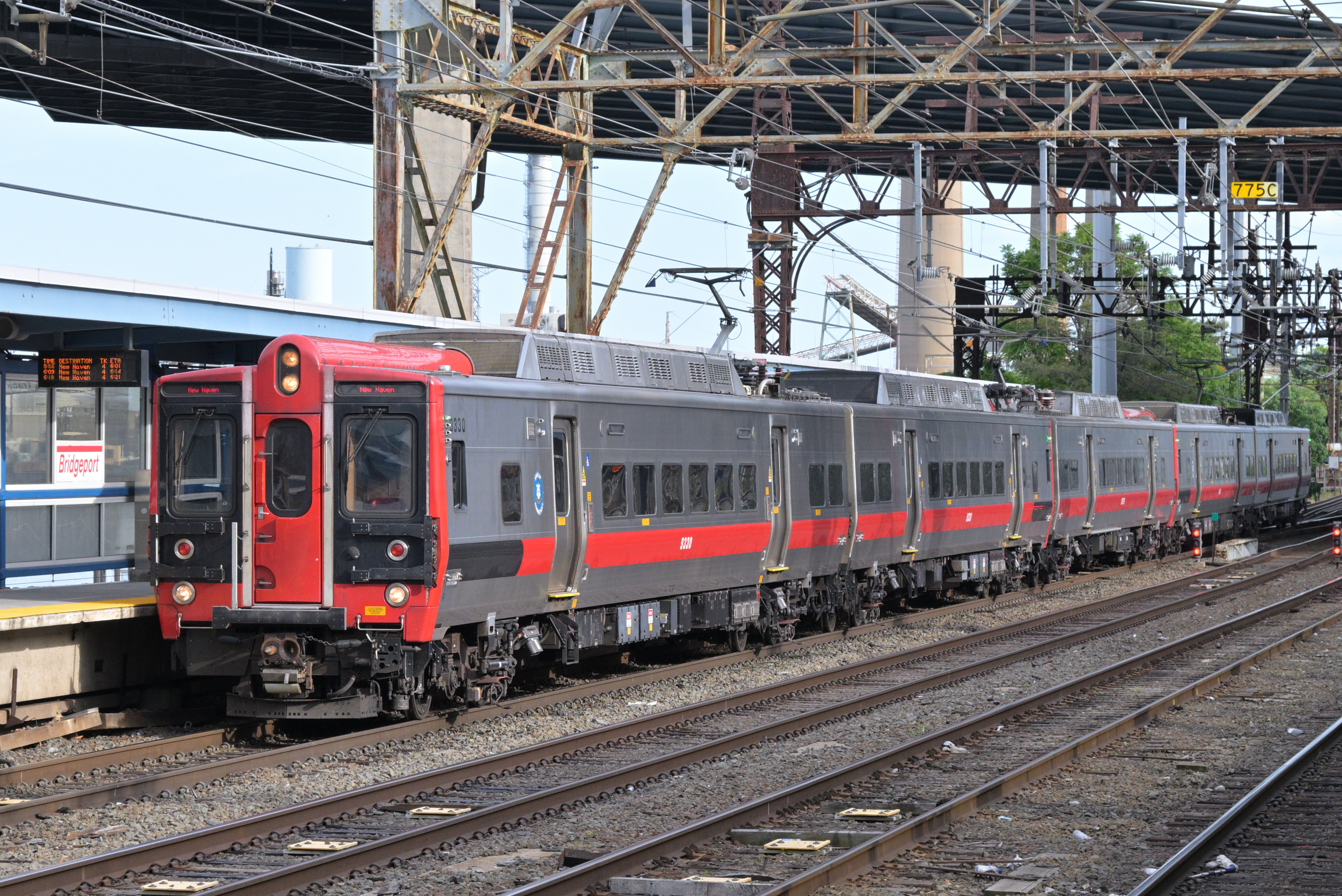
- M8 EMUs on a Metro-North train arriving at Bridgeport on the New Haven Line.

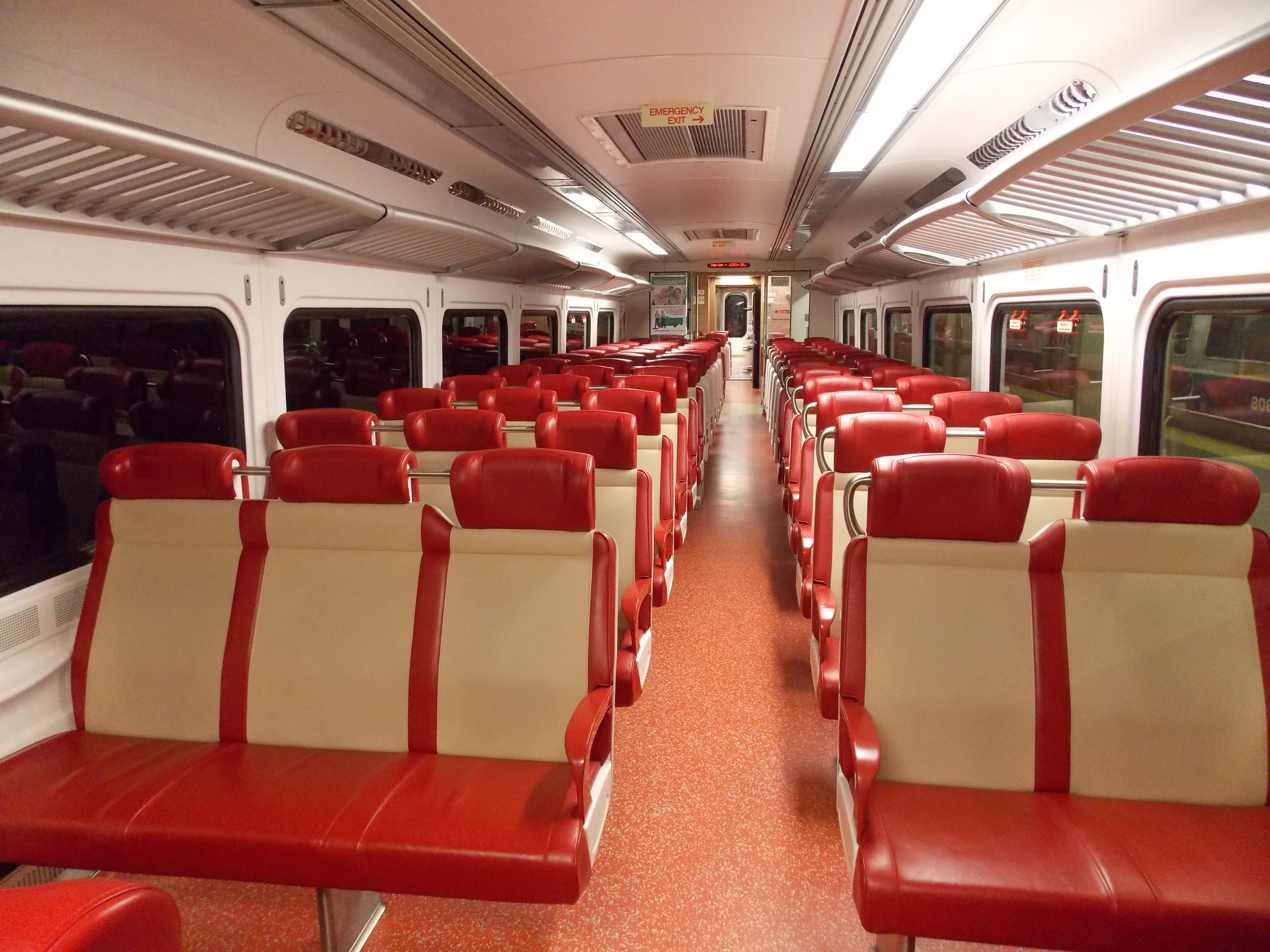
- Inside an M8 EMU
- In service: 2011–present
- Manufacturer: Kawasaki
- Built at: Yonkers, New York, U.S.; Lincoln, Nebraska, U.S.; Kobe, Japan
- Family name: M-Series
- Replaced: M2/M4/M6
- Entered service: March 1, 2011
- Number built: 465 (in use)
- Formation: 220 married pairs, 25 single cars
- Capacity: A car: 111 seated; B car: 101 seated; Single car: 114 seated
- Owners: Metropolitan Transportation Authority; Connecticut Department of Transportation
- Operators: Metro-North Railroad; Amtrak (under contract with CT Rail)

Specifications
- Car length: 85 ft (25,908 mm)
- Width: 10 ft 5 in (3,175 mm)
- Height: 14 ft 7.5 in (4,458 mm) at top of pantograph
- Maximum speed: Design: 100 mph (161 km/h); Shore Line East service: 90 mph (145 km/h); Metro North service: 80 mph (129 km/h)
- Weight: A car: 143,000 lb (65,000 kg); B car: 141,600 lb (64,200 kg); Single car: 126,500 lb (57,400 kg)
- Traction system: Mitsubishi Electric MAP-204-A25VD191 IGBT–C/I
- Traction motors: 8 × Mitsubishi MB-5129-A; 270 hp (200 kW) asynchronous 3ϕ AC
- Electric systems: Third rail, 750 V DC; Overhead line: 25 kV 60 Hz AC; 12.5 kV 60 Hz AC
- Current collection: Third rail: Contact shoe; Overhead line: Pantograph
- UIC classification: Bo′Bo′+Bo′Bo′
- AAR wheel arrangement: B-B+B-B
- Braking system: Regenerative / pneumatic
- Safety systems: ATC and Pulse code cab signaling
- Coupling system: Budd pin and cup coupler
- Track gauge: 4 ft 8 1/2 in (1,435 mm) standard gauge

The M8 is an electric multiple unit railroad car built by Kawasaki for use on the Metro-North Railroad New Haven Line and the CT Rail Shore Line East. The fleet of 471 cars first entered service in 2011, replacing the M2, M4 and M6 cars, which entered service in 1973, 1987 and 1994, respectively. An additional 60-car order is currently finishing delivery in response to increased ridership and usage on Shore Line East.

== Design ==
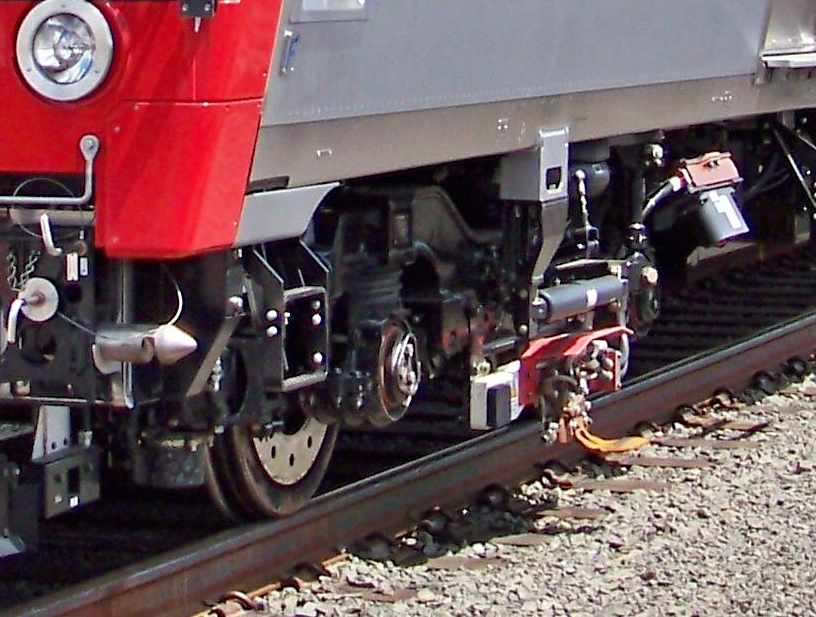
M8 dual-mode third-rail shoe

The M8 is similar in design to the M7 car used on the Harlem Line and the Hudson Line. Like the M7, the M8 is able to pick up 750 V DC power from bottom-contact third rail for operation along the New Haven Line from Grand Central Terminal to Pelham, where the traction power source is transferred to the overhead catenary wire. The overhead wire is at a nominal 12.5 kV AC (60 Hz) power from overhead lines via pantographs for operation from Pelham, New York to New Haven, Connecticut (as well as along the New Canaan Branch), and 25 kV AC (60 Hz) power from catenary for operation along the Shore Line East route east of New Haven to New London, Connecticut. Unlike in earlier classes, changeover between the two AC voltages can be made by the engineer while on the move.

In response to rising number of people seeking to use their bicycle to solve the "last mile" problem between Metro-North stations and destinations, CTDOT has pledged to provide bike racks for storage of two bicycles in the disabled riders area of each rail car. In the event that a disabled rider boards a car, all cyclists must move their bicycles to the entry vestibule. In spite of the hook installation, during peak travel periods only folding bicycles are permitted aboard most Metro North trains.

The M8s have new roomier, high-back seats with individual headrests and curved arm rests for more comfort. For improved safety, especially in the vestibules, the cars have larger windows and better lighting. An additional safety feature is the installation of intercom systems that customers can use to contact the train crew in case of emergency. Other features included curved luggage racks, coat hooks, electrical outlets to charge personal devices, and LED displays that show that next stop and automated announcements. The cars also have external public address speakers, and electronic destination signs. Higher reliability is possible with single leaf doors, which also lessen the susceptibility to snow intrusion. Also, the M8s have sealed alternating current motors that are less susceptible to weather.

The M8s have regenerative braking; each time that the cars go into braking mode, the cars feed back power into the catenary system. The M8s are equipped with contact shoes that can operate on both Metro-North's under-running and the LIRR over-running third rail.

The exterior design of the new M8 rail car is red, in keeping with the traditional exterior color of the New Haven Line rail cars. The body shape is similar to the M7 rail cars that are in operation on the Hudson and Harlem lines. Design of the M8 railcars was done by Cesar Vergara's Vergarastudio.

== History ==
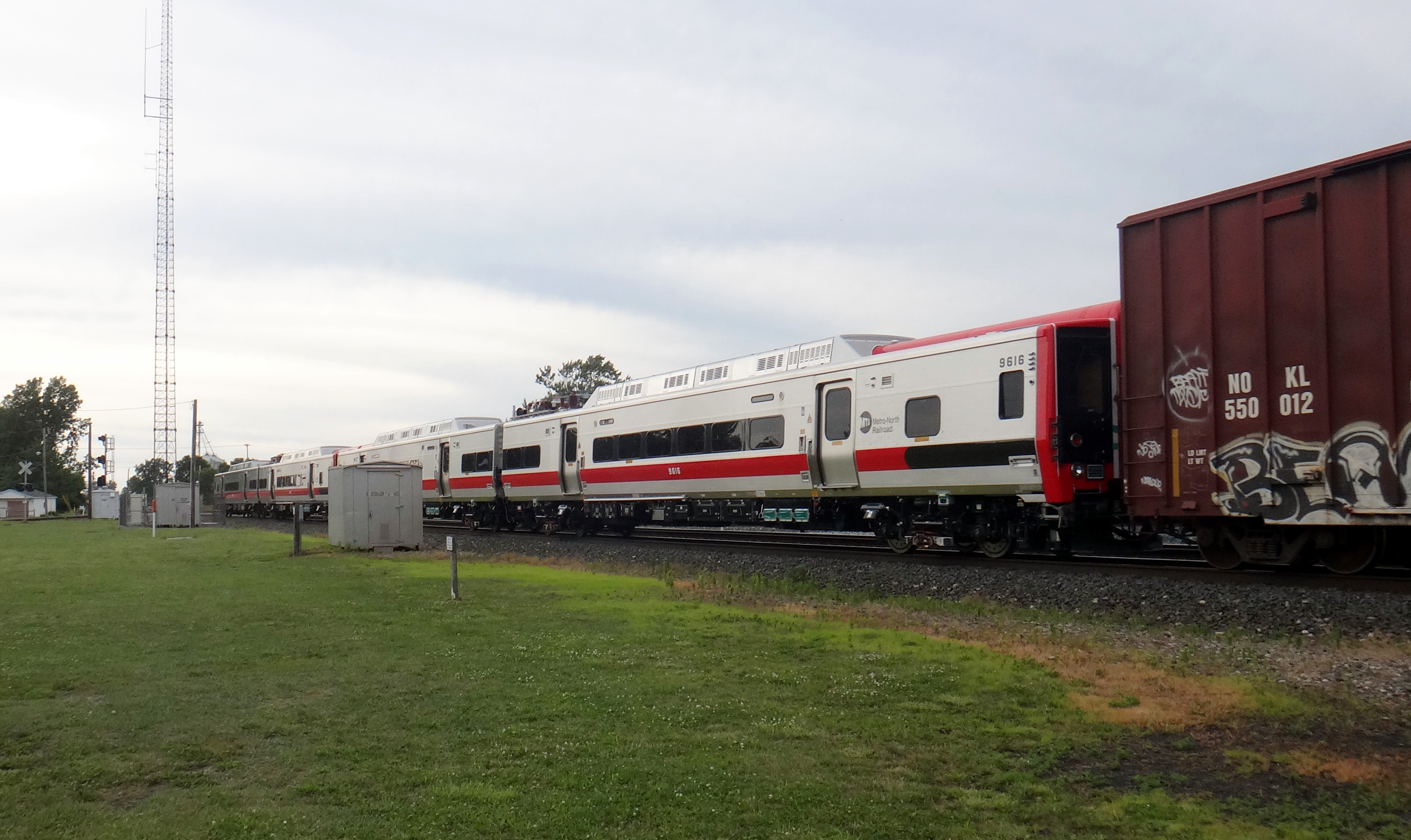
Four new M8 cars being shipped by CSX through Ohio in 2014

The Connecticut Department of Transportation and Metro–North Railroad awarded the contract for the M8s to Kawasaki in August 2006 for $706.3 million, for a total of 380 cars, of which 210 would be in the base order, including an option order of 90 cars. 65% of the cost was paid by Connecticut, while the remaining 35% was paid by Metro–North. Later on, two additional option orders were added; the first consisted of 42 cars and the second consisted of 38 cars. Full production of the M8s was scheduled to begin in early 2010 but was then delayed. Kawasaki cited problems with steel suppliers and sub-contractors (which is responsible for 60% of the cars). Once production reached full output the cars were delivered at a rate of ten per month.

The first M8s were supposed to be delivered in late 2009. In December 2010, the first 24 cars were received and began to undergo testing.

The cars were originally supposed to go into revenue service in December 2010, however, because of technical problems, revenue service was deferred until March 1, 2011. The first run of the initial eight-car set (consisting of cars 9114, 9115, 9116, 9117, 9112, 9113, 9108, and 9109) originated in Stamford at 10:30 am, arriving in Grand Central Terminal at 11:28 am. A total of ten eight-car train sets were slated to enter service by the end of the year.

On May 7, 2011, Kawasaki announced that deliveries of 20 cars of the 80 scheduled to enter service by the end of the year would be delayed due to supply problems; Kawasaki said it would build the cars at a later date and absorb the costs incurred. At the time of the announcement, 16 cars had entered service, with an additional ten delivered but not yet in service.

Two months later, an investigative report by WABC-TV's news operation examined correspondence between Kawasaki and Metro-North over the delays in introducing the cars. At the time it had been claimed the cars merely had software problems, but the documents reporters obtained under New York's Freedom of Information Law showed Kawasaki repeatedly asking for deadline extensions over issues such as bad weather and financial difficulties at the company that supplied the onboard toilets. Railroad officials complained in emails reviewed by the channel that some of the requests "defie[d] logic" and were a waste of time. Kawasaki said such multiple delays were "not unusual given the complexity of the cars and suppliers" and were often beyond their control.

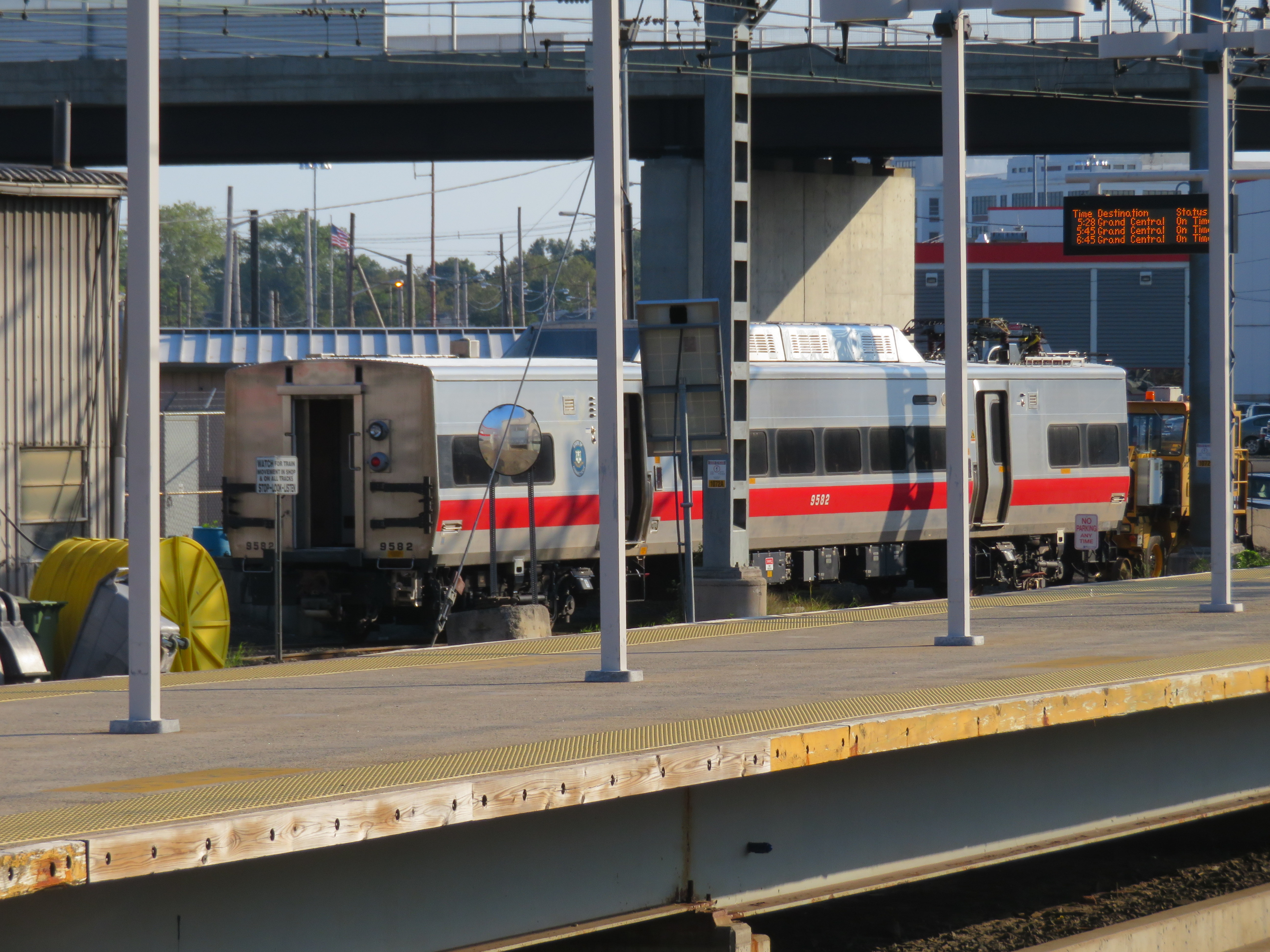
An unpowered single car at New Haven Yard in 2018

On July 20, 2011, the Connecticut Department of Transportation announced the order of 25 unpowered M8 railcars, with options for up to 25 more, at a cost of $93 million to provide additional service. The new cars are single cars, allowing for one car, instead of two, to be added to an additional train, which is an efficient way to add capacity to meet ridership growth. They were also intended to replace the 48 car M6 fleet.

On October 16, 2012, Metro-North announced that they would be installing 15 weekday and 30 weekend M8 trains to their schedule to accommodate increased ridership.

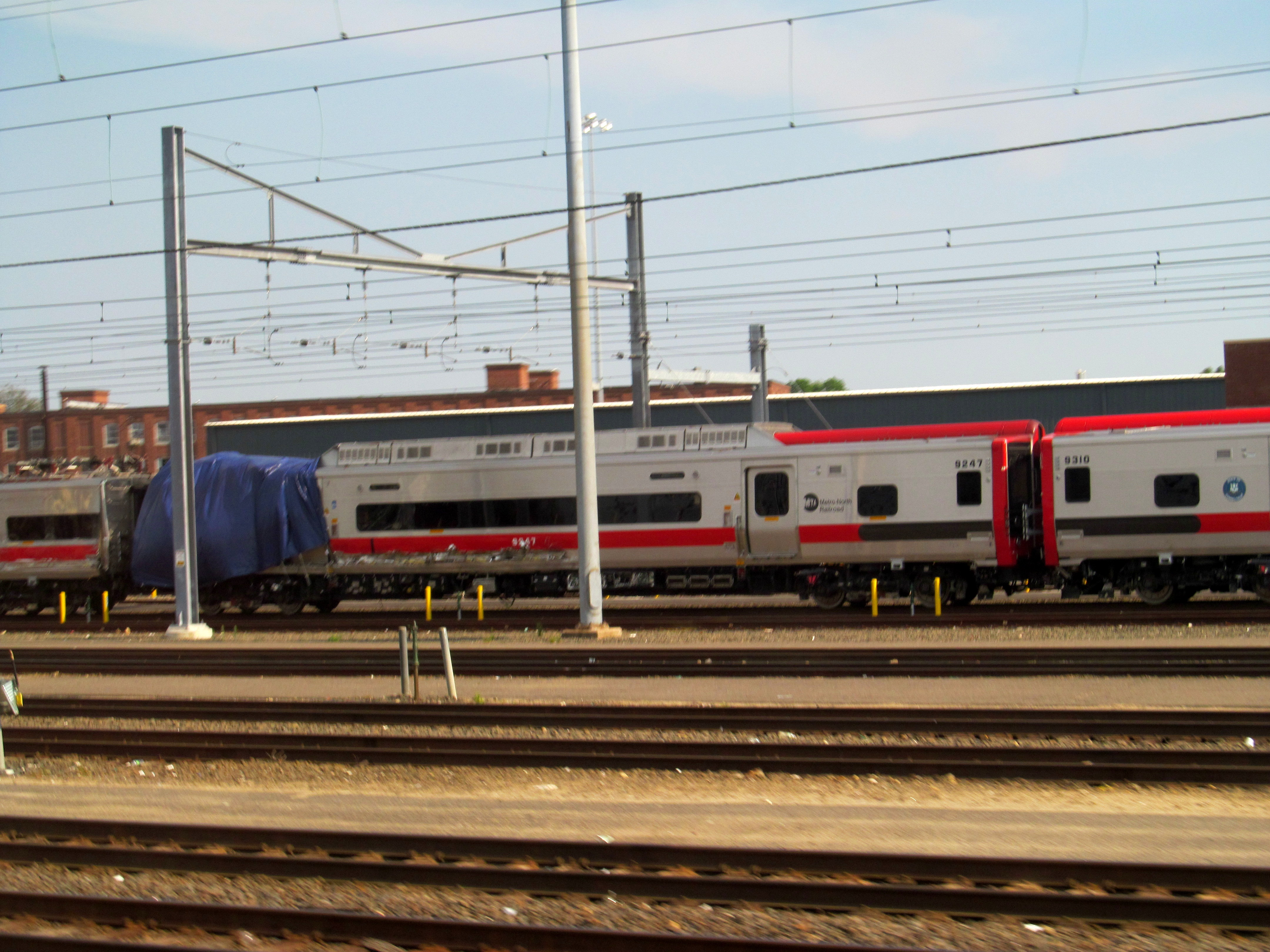
Damaged M8 cars in Bridgeport yard two weeks after the Fairfield train crash

On May 17, 2013, several cars were damaged in a train accident in Fairfield, Connecticut. Senator Richard Blumenthal of Connecticut credited the M8 railcars' design with potentially saving lives. On January 29, 2014, the MTA board approved a miscellaneous procurement to purchase three additional M8 cars (one pair and one additional B car; to replace cars lost in the Fairfield Crash), twelve car trucks, spare parts, additional bench test equipment and repairs to four additional M8s. Of the total cost of $36 million, $8.4 million will be funded by a credit from Kawasaki in the original contract. The remainder will be funded by Metro-North and CTDOT.

The original order of 405 cars was completed on July 13, 2015, except for the 25 unpowered cars on option. Of the 380 original cars, the first 38 cars were built in Kobe, Japan, while the remaining 342 were built at Kawasaki's plant in Lincoln, Nebraska.

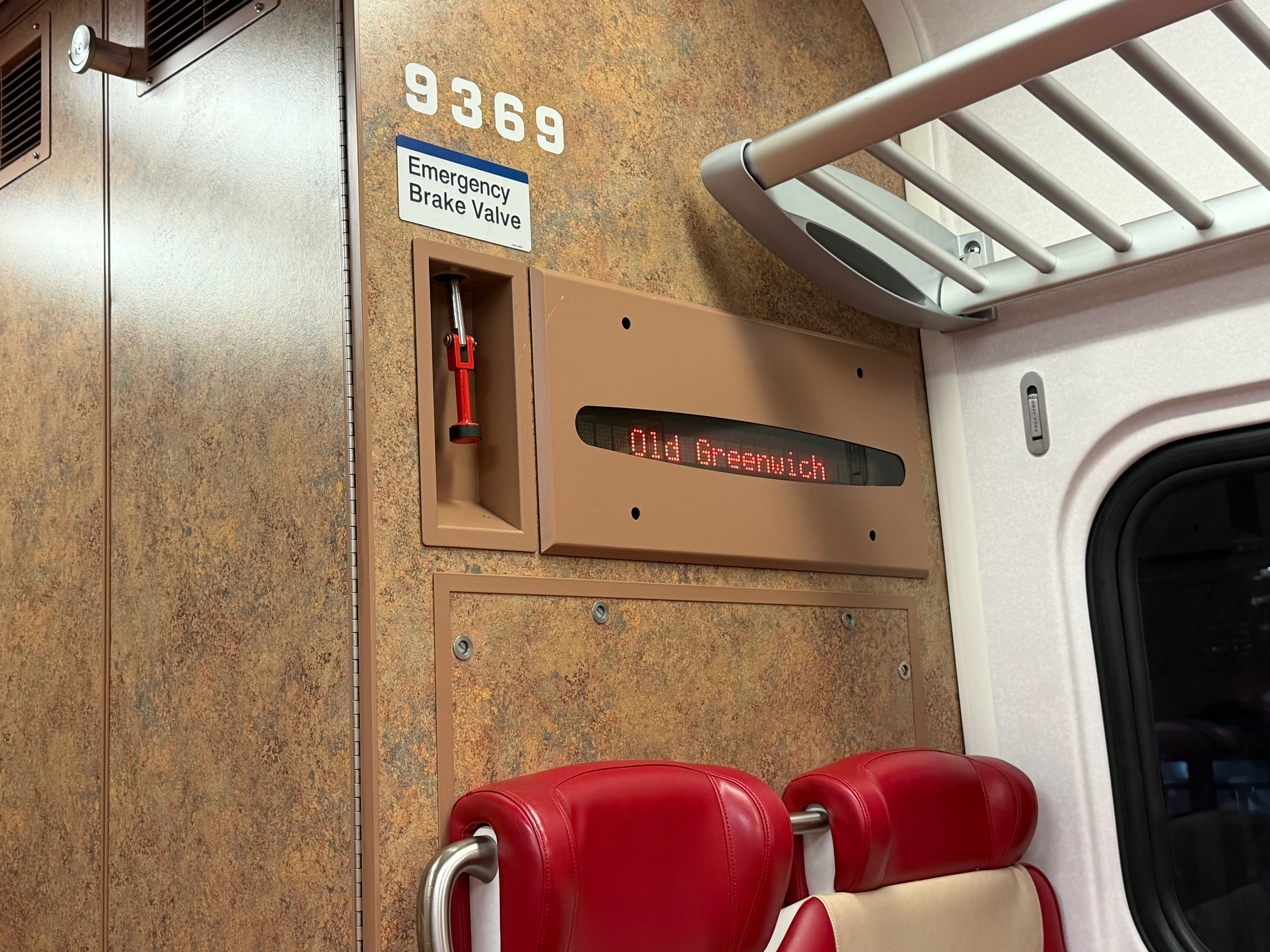
Passenger information system

The purchase of the M8s was based on ridership growth forecasts, and it was not anticipated that additional train cars would need to be purchased until the 2020–2024 MTA Capital Program. However, increased ridership required additional cars to be purchased. Currently, 24 existing cars are intended to be used for service on Shore Line East. On September 13, 2016, Connecticut governor Dannel Malloy announced plans for the state to purchase 60 additional M8 cars, funded by $200 million from the state and $108 million from the MTA, with delivery beginning in 2019. The cars cost $3.85 million apiece for a total of $231 million; the remaining cost covers other expenses like inspections plus a 15% contingency. Ten of the cars were to be bar cars, similar to those of the former M2 fleet retired in 2014. The MTA board approved the 60 additional cars in November 2016, with an option to buy another 34 cars. The cars were expected to enter service in three years, allowing the railroad to lengthen rush hour trains, retire the last M2s, and to have flexibility to increase train service with increasing ridership. The bar cars were later dropped, due to cost and train capacity concerns, as well as Metro-North not being willing to handle the bar themselves, wishing for an outside company to run the operation itself. M8s have provided all service on the New Haven Line since the retirement of the last remaining M2 cars at the end of December 2018.

Testing of M8 cars on the Shore Line East route took place intermittently in the 2010s. On March 21, 2021, the Connecticut DOT Commissioner stated that M8 testing on the Shore Line East was continuing, and that a set might be provided to the MBTA for testing and potential joint orders in the future. Amtrak crew qualifications with M8 cars on Shore Line East took place in April 2022. Four-car sets of M8s began running on Shore Line East on May 24, 2022, providing all service on the line.

== Car roster ==
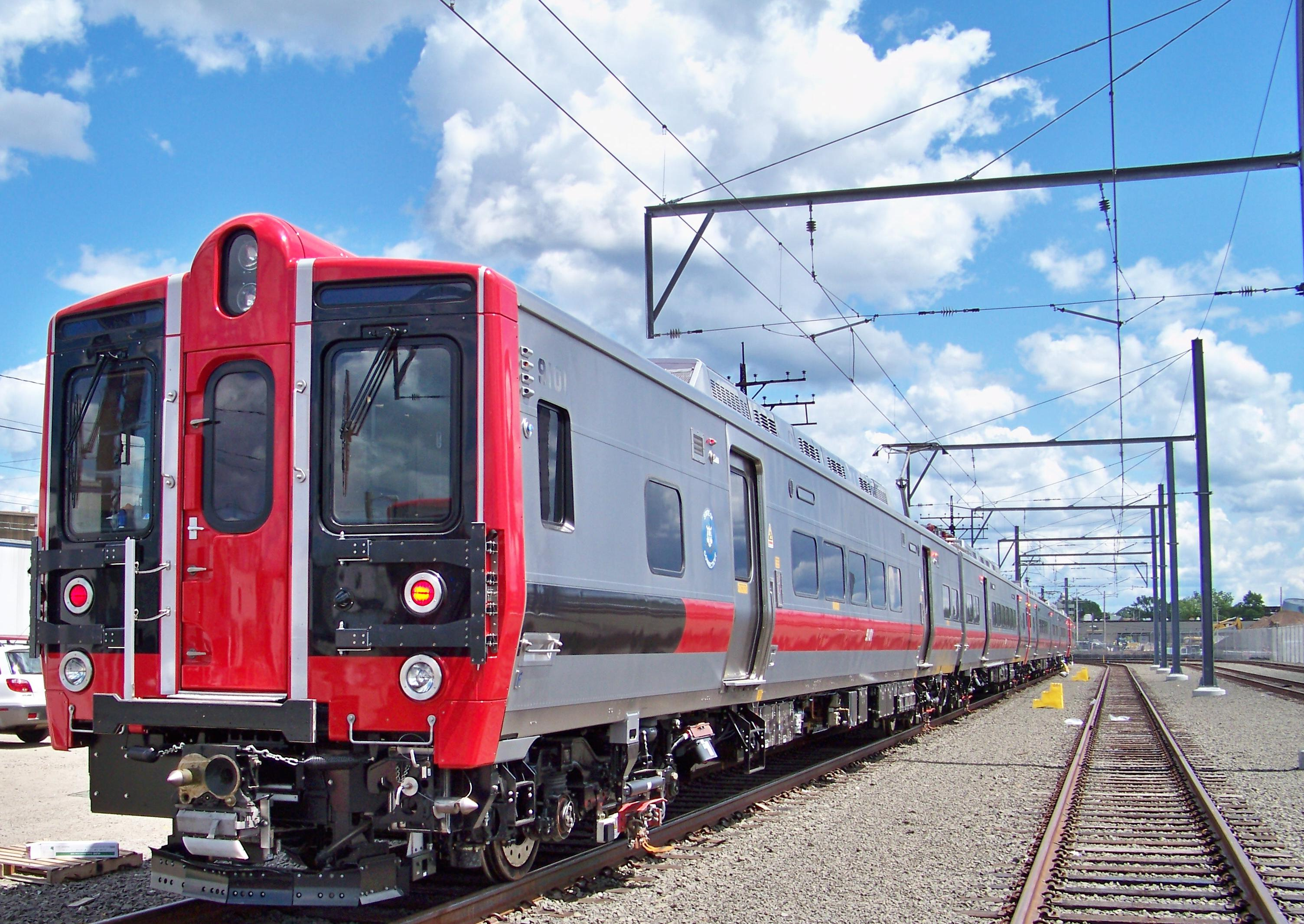
A set of M8 cars in New Haven Yard in 2016

- 9100-9199, 9300-9399, 9500-9519, 9600-9623, 9701-9738 (CTDOT / pairs) - 282 cars
- 9200-9299, 9400-9443 (MTA / pairs) - 144 cars
- 9460-9476 (MTA / unpowered singles; even numbers only) - 9 cars
- 9560-9590 (CTDOT / unpowered singles; even numbers only) - 16 cars
- 9530/9631 - 9542/9643 (CTDOT / pairs; 95xx even numbers only, 96xx odd numbers only) - 14 cars

== See also ==
- M1/M3 (railcar)
- M7 (railcar)
- M9 (railcar)
