= Buffet car =

Train car where food and beverages are offered and consumed

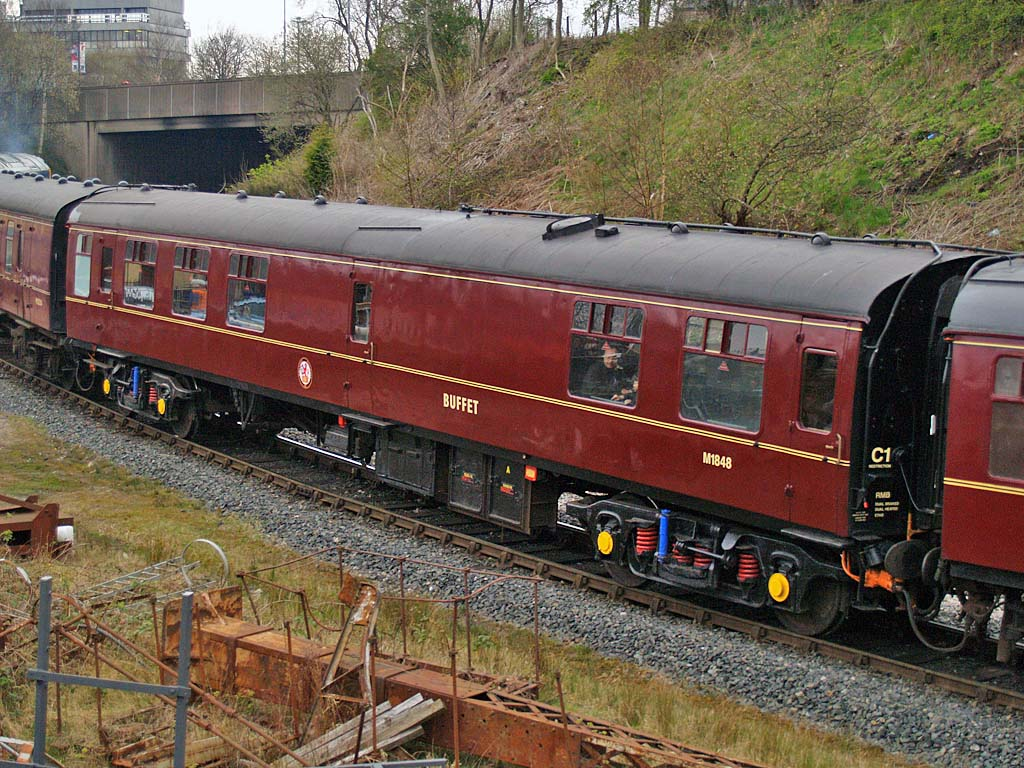
British Rail Mark 1 RMB M1848 on the East Lancashire Railway

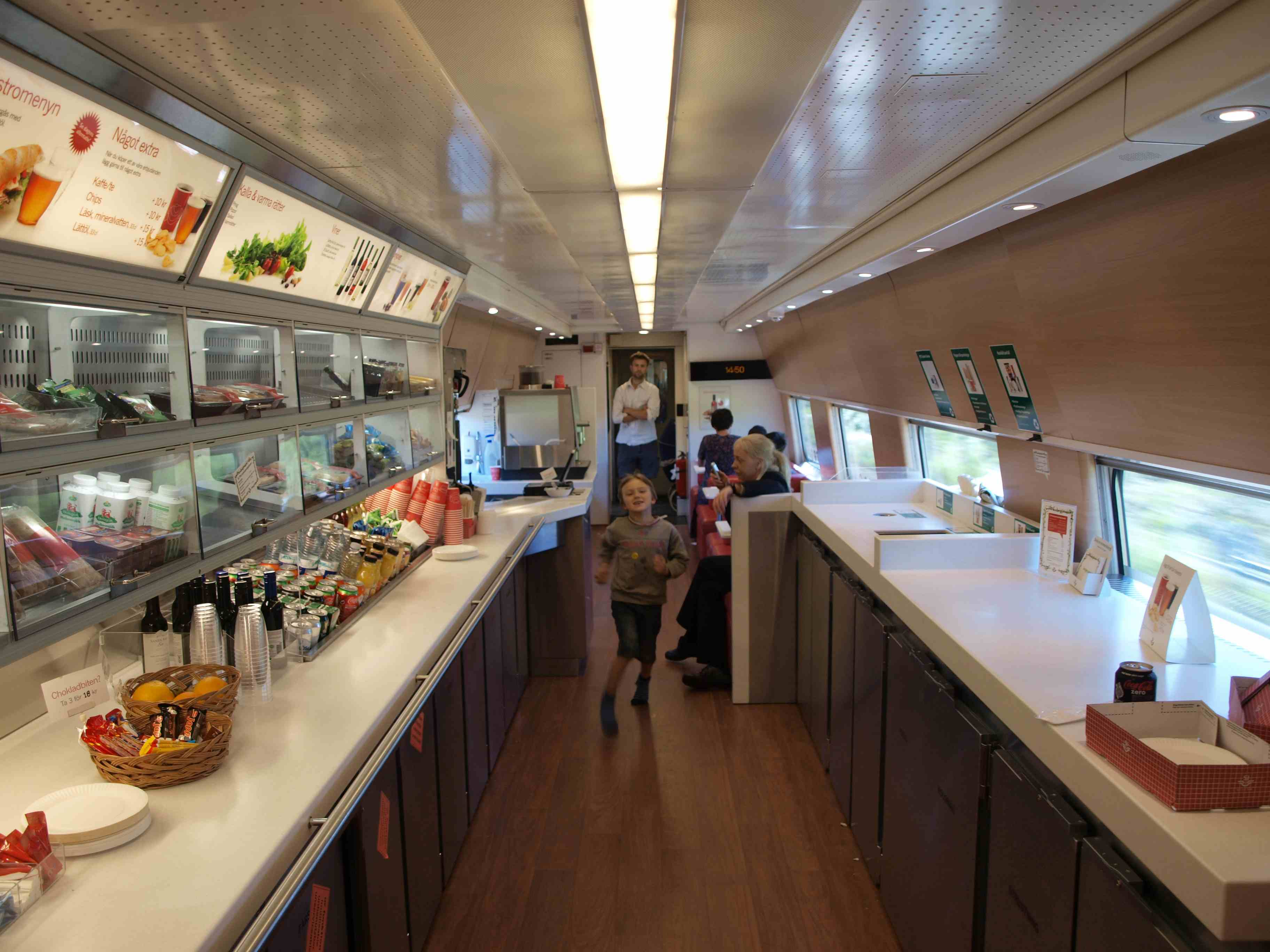
Swedish X2000 train buffet cars are mostly self-service. Customers pick their food from a shelf, pay for it, and heat it themselves in a microwave oven

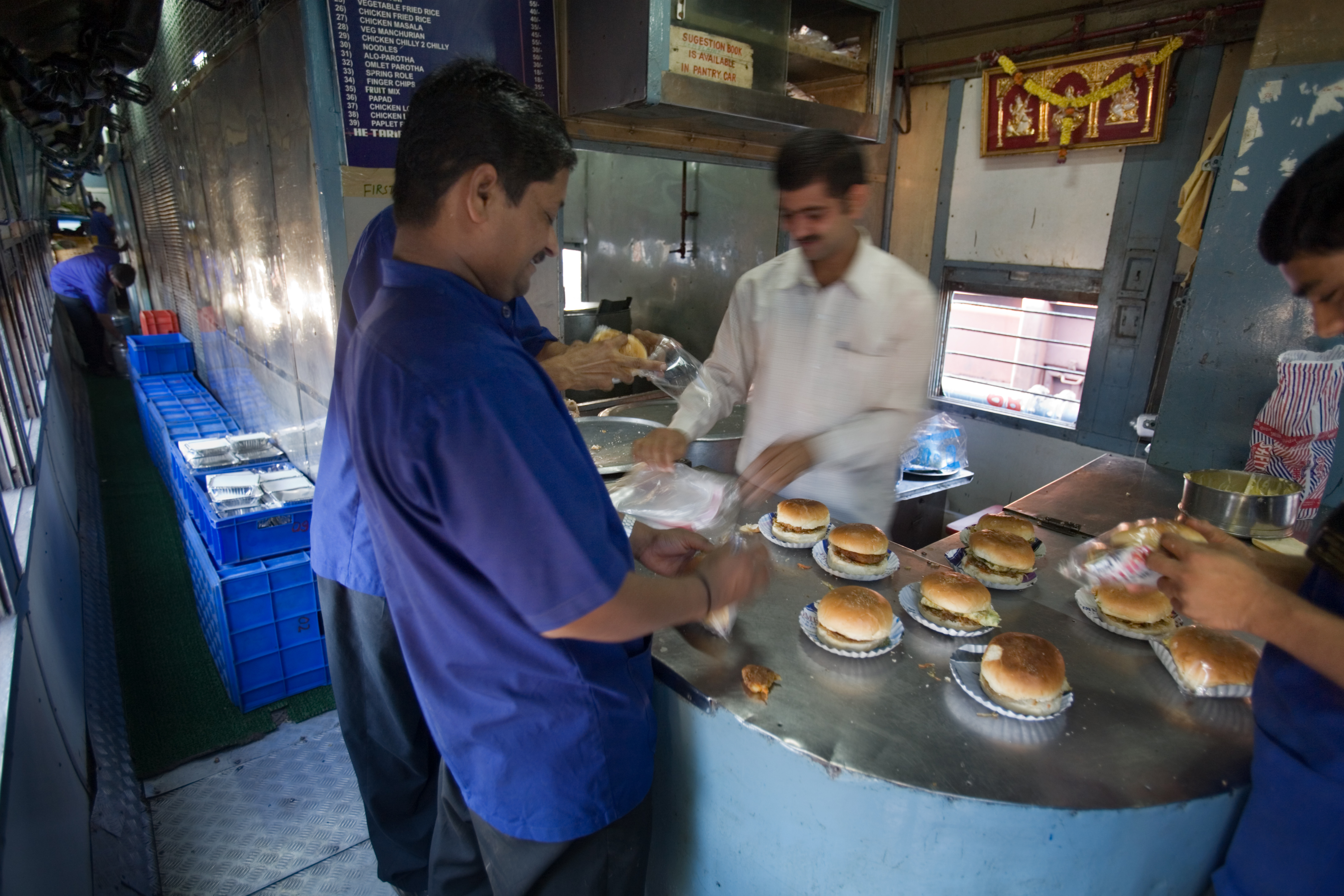
An Indian railways buffet car

A buffet car (British English) or café car (American English) is a passenger railroad car, where food and beverages can be purchased at a counter. It offers a lower level of service than a dining car (also called a restaurant car in some regions), where passengers are served at tables, but requires fewer staff, reducing operating costs.

Some buffet or café cars include a seating area where passengers can consume their purchases. Typically, passengers are not allowed to eat or drink items brought from elsewhere. On trains without a seating area, passengers are expected to return to their seats to consume any onboard purchases.

== History ==
The invention of the buffet car has been attributed to George Pullman, who desired "light refreshment" as he traveled, which the heaviness of a diner or restaurant car didn't satisfy. In 1883, Pullman ordered the first buffet cars for the West Shore Railway- although there were cars that offered light refreshment before this point. The introduction of buffet cars, and other sorts of "semi-diners" like cafe cars, grill cars, sandwich cars, etc. reestablished Pullman in the food trade. Full diners were rare in the Pullman fleet, but cars offering "light food" were much more common- for example, in 1933, Pullman was operating 64 restaurant cars, 171 buffet cars, and 137 cars that also offered light food.

After 1955, dining cars- which were heavy, and expensive to run- were infrequently built in the USA, although semi-diners such as buffet cars continued to be built and offer food to customers.

== See also ==
- Bar car
- British Rail coach type codes
- Buffet
- Lounge car
