= Bar car =

Train car equipped for beverage service

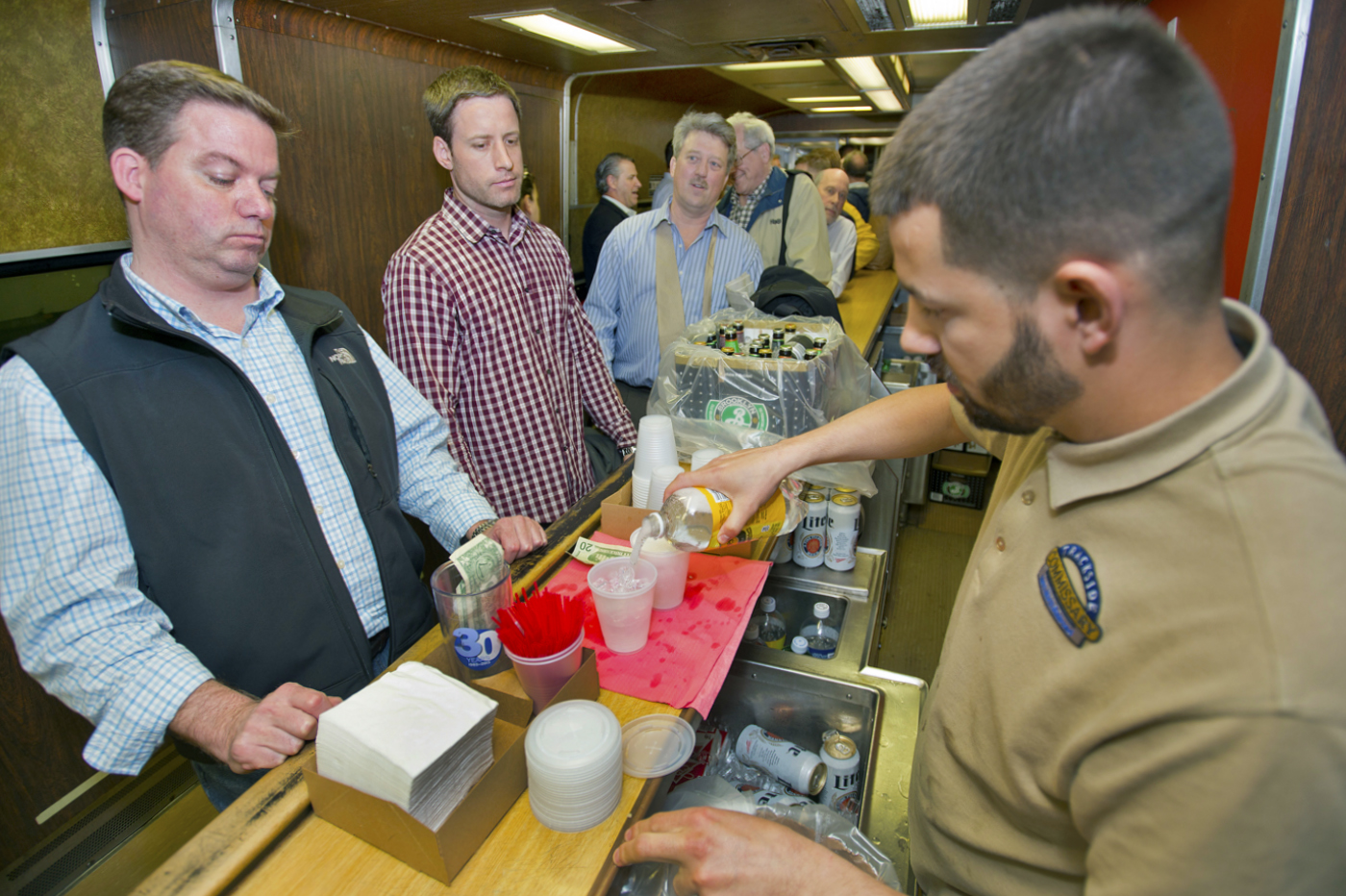
Bar car on Metro-North's New Haven Line on last day of operations

A bar car is a train car that has as its primary purpose the provision and consumption of alcoholic and other beverages.

== In the United States ==
Bar cars were common during the heyday of U.S. rail travel prior to World War II. Since May 2014, outside of Amtrak's full-service lounges, café, and dining cars, there are no bar cars left.

=== Former services ===
The Long Island Rail Road operated bar cars from 1960 until 1999, when the rolling stock on the railroad's non-electrified branches was replaced with double-decker C3 coaches.

Metro-North Railroad has replaced the 1970s-era cars now used by commuters from New York City to Connecticut, with the new M-8 cars rolled out between 2010 and 2015. The M-8 was designed by Cesar Vergara, a train designer from Ridgefield, Connecticut, who also provided a design for a modern bar car. The last bar cars were retired in May 2014.

Formerly, a bar car service (officially, "refreshment car") ran on 3 of Chicago's Metra lines: the Milwaukee District North Line, the Milwaukee District West Line, and the Rock Island District line. The last service was on August 29, 2008, when the last contracts expired.

10 Comet I bar cars were built in 1970 for the Erie Lackawanna and were used for AM coffee service and PM bar service on diesel trains based from Hoboken Terminal into the 1980s. The bar cars were converted to standard coaches when rebuilt in 1987.

== In Canada ==
Canadian National Railways's Rapido service from Toronto to Montreal, for a brief time during the late 1960s and 1970s, had what was known as a "Bistro" car. In the "Bistro" car, piano entertainment accompanied the service of alcohol beverage in special coaches configured for the purpose with their windows obscured to prevent platform patrons from observing the festivities and to create a low light environment.

Contemporary services on Via Rail include complimentary unlimited alcoholic beverages served at your seat in Business Class on Corridor trains. Alcoholic beverages are available for at-seat purchase/service in Economy Class on all remote services trains. On long-distance trains such as The Canadian and The Ocean, alcoholic beverages are available for purchase in the Skyline, Park, and Dining Cars. Service to Prestige Class passengers is complimentary.

== See also ==
- Spårakoff
- Buffet car
