= M7 (railcar) =

Long Island Rail Road and Metro-North car

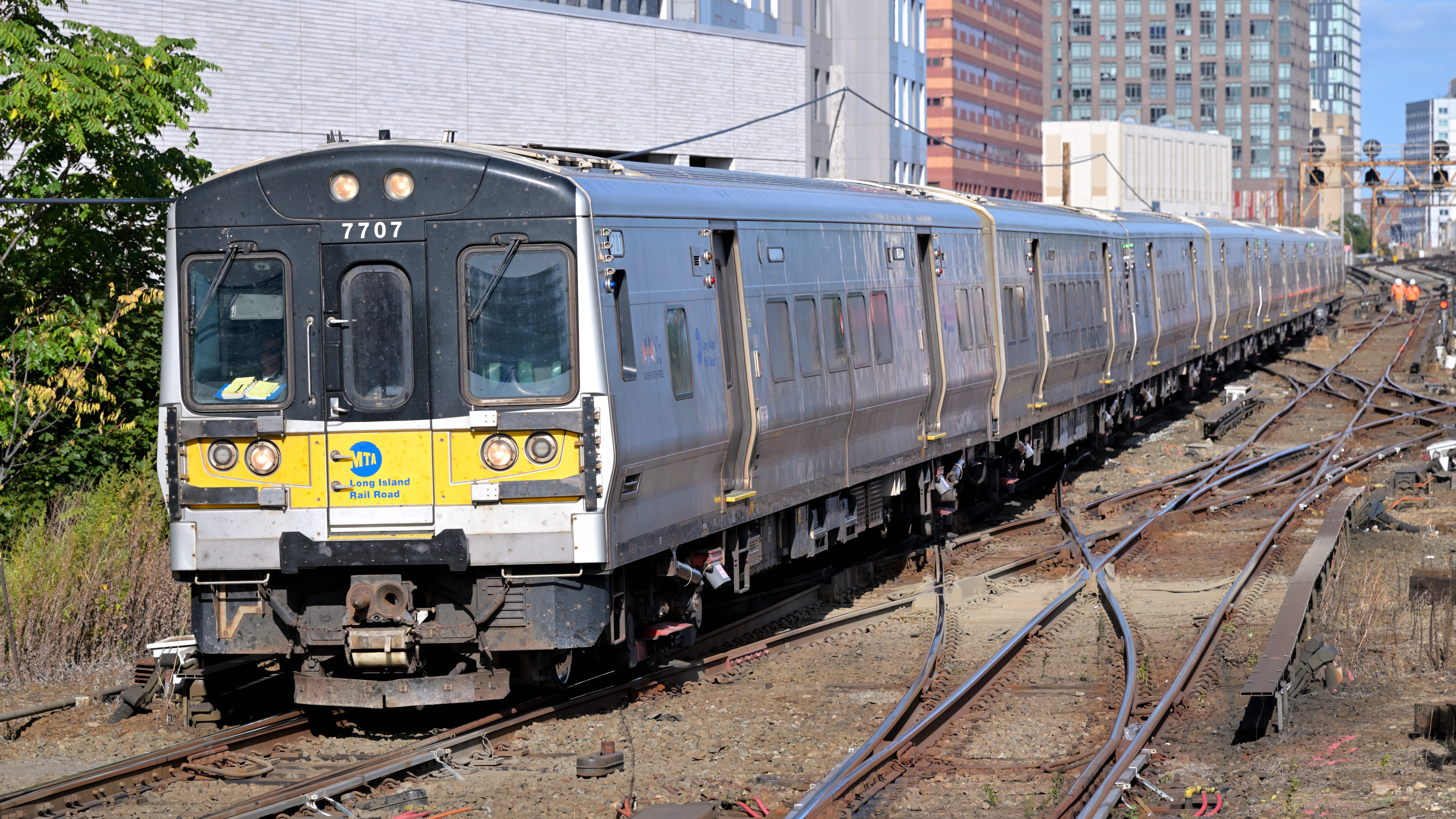
- LIRR M7 No. 7707 approaching Jamaica

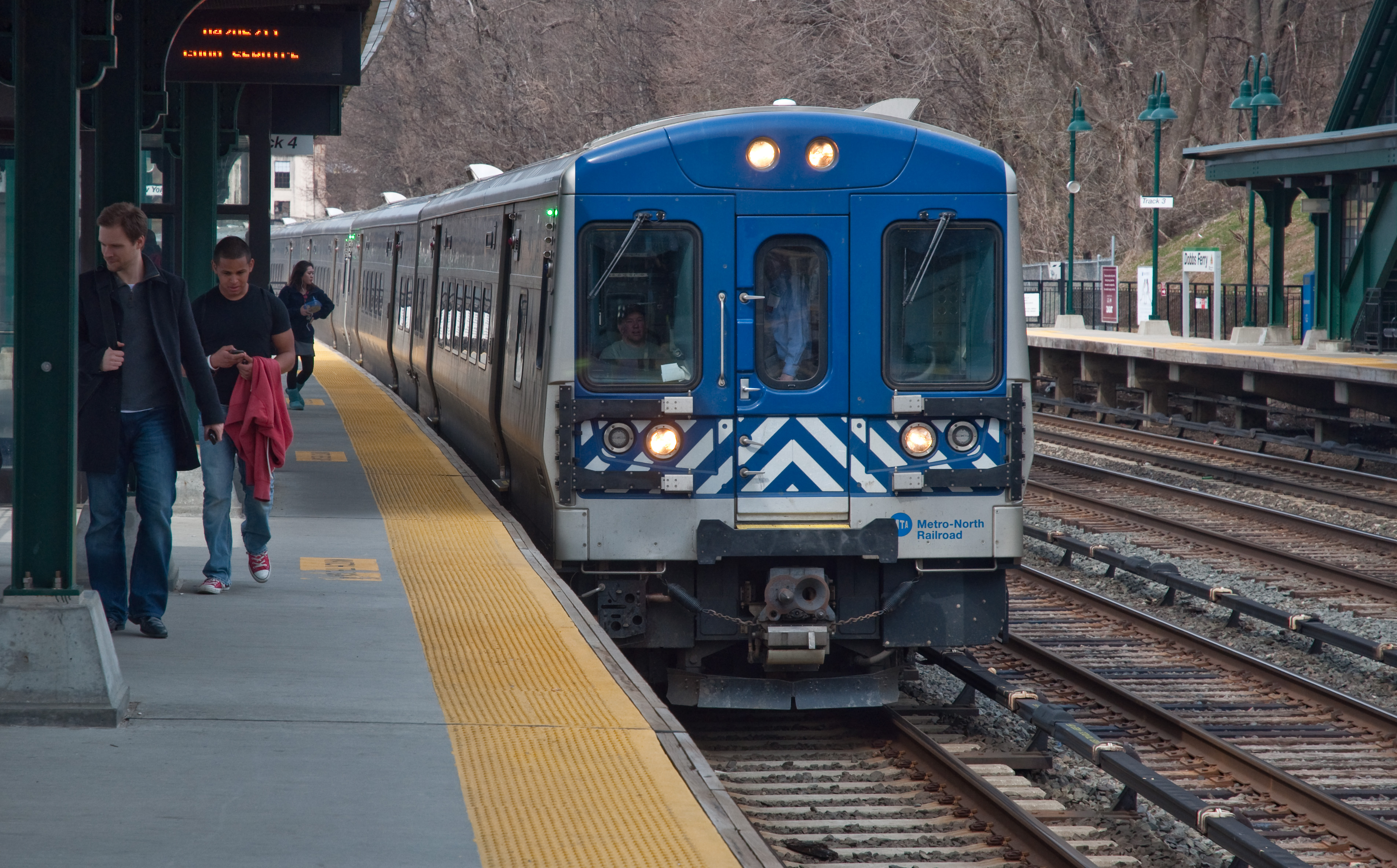
- Metro-North M7A stopped at Dobbs Ferry station
- In service: M7: 2002–present; M7A: 2004-present
- Manufacturer: Bombardier Transportation
- Built at: La Pocatière, Quebec, Canada + Plattsburgh, New York, US
- Replaced: All remaining M1s; All remaining ACMUs
- Constructed: 1999–2006
- Number built: 1,172 cars; Long Island Rail Road: 836 cars; Metro-North Railroad: 336 cars
- Number in service: 1,162; Long Island Rail Road: 828 cars; Metro-North Railroad: 334 cars
- Number scrapped: M7: 8; M7A: 2
- Formation: Married pairs
- Fleet numbers: LIRR: 7001–7836; MNCR: 4000–4335
- Capacity: 110 seated (A car); 101 seated (B car)
- Operators: MTA (LIRR and MNCR)

Specifications
- Car body construction: Stainless steel
- Car length: 85 ft (25,908 mm)
- Width: 10 ft 6 in (3,200 mm)
- Height: 13 ft 3 in (4,039 mm)
- Floor height: 4 ft 3 in (1,295 mm)
- Wheel diameter: 36 in (914 mm)
- Wheelbase: 8 ft 6 in (2,591 mm)
- Maximum speed: 100 mph (161 km/h) (design); 80 mph (129 km/h) (service)
- Weight: 128,300 lb (58,200 kg) (A car); 125,300 lb (56,800 kg) (B car)
- Traction system: Mitsubishi Electric IGBT–VVVF inverter: M7: MAP-202-75VD92
- Traction motors: 8 × Mitsubishi 200 kW (270 hp) asynchronous 3-phase AC; M7: MB-5088-A; M7A: MB-5088-A2
- Power output: 2,120 hp (1,580 kW) per unit
- Acceleration: 2 mph/s (3.2 km/(h⋅s))
- Deceleration: 3 mph/s (4.8 km/(h⋅s)) (service); 3.2 mph/s (5.1 km/(h⋅s)) (emergency)
- Electric systems: Third rail, 750 V DC
- Current collection: Contact shoe
- UIC classification: Bo′Bo′+Bo′Bo′
- AAR wheel arrangement: B-B+B-B
- Braking system: Regenerative / Pneumatic
- Safety systems: ATC and Pulse code cab signaling
- Coupling system: Budd Pin and Cup coupler
- Track gauge: 4 ft 8 1/2 in (1,435 mm) standard gauge

The M7 is an electric multiple unit railroad car built by Bombardier for use on the MTA's Long Island Rail Road (LIRR) and Metro-North Railroad. With delivery beginning in 2002, the M7 replaced the M1 railcars on both railroads as well as the ACMUs on Metro-North. The cars built for Metro-North were designated as the M7As, and contain minor differences from the M7s found on the LIRR. A total of 1,172 M7 cars were built for the two railroads.

== Description ==
Cars are arranged as married pairs, where each car contains a complete set of controls for an engineer, conductor, or brakeman. However, the 'B' Cars (denoted by odd-numbered car designations) contain a handicapped accessible restroom, which is larger than the restroom provided on the M1 and M3 railcars and designed to accommodate a wheelchair, as well as an attendant and/or service animal (such as a guide dog, hearing dog or service dog) accompanying the passenger. The enlarged bathroom reduces the number of seats in the car.

The M7 was built as two separate but similar models due to the different electrical and signaling systems on the LIRR and Metro-North. These two models, the M7 and M7A, share most of their attributes, but have a few notable differences. Most prominently, the styling of the end of the car is different; on the M7, it is mostly black with a single horizontal yellow stripe, while on the M7A it is mostly blue with several white stripes. This is the primary cosmetic difference, and the cars otherwise look nearly identical. Other, more minor, aesthetic differences include illuminated number boards, present on the M7 but absent on the M7A. Aside from differences in appearance, the cars are built for the different types of third rail used by the two railroads: the M7 is equipped for the LIRR's over-running third rail, while the M7A is equipped for Metro-North's under-running third rail. For this reason, the two cars are not interchangeable between the two railroads.

== History ==
=== Procurement ===
In late 1999, a contract was awarded to Bombardier for 836 LIRR M7s. Delivery began in early 2002, and test trains for the LIRR M7 began on the Ronkonkoma Branch. After several successful tests, LIRR M7 revenue service began on the Long Beach Branch on October 30, 2002, and Metro-North's first M7A started scheduled service in April 2004. All M7s were delivered by early 2007.

=== Early troubleshooting ===
The M7 cars swayed from side to side more than intended when introduced to service, and required modifications to reduce the sway. In late 2006 the MTA began a replacement of all M7 armrests after paying out over $100,000 to customers who filed complaints. The factory-installed armrests were notorious for slipping into trouser pockets and then tearing them when sitting. The new design is of a different profile and is coated in a more fabric-friendly rubber. Some passengers complained about having fewer seats per B car, a consequence of the larger ADA-compliant restrooms, and about the width of the seats. Metro-North's management received feedback about the M7, which influenced the development of the M8 railcars for the New Haven Line.

In the fall of 2006, the M7As started to experience serious braking problems due to foliage on the right-of-way, a condition known as "Slip-Slide." This caused nearly 2/3 of the Metro-North fleet to be taken out of service, due to flat spots on wheels. While the LIRR fleet performed significantly better, stripped M1s from both railroads were reactivated, and diminished schedules were instituted until the M7 fleet was able to resume full operation.

As of 2007, the fleet has the highest mean distance between failures out of the entire LIRR fleet. This partly had to do with the fleet's newness, and so the fleet often needed to be tested for reliability.

=== Later history ===
The Metro-North M7As were used in the 2016 film The Girl on the Train.

On April 19, 2021, the LIRR proposed equipping two pairs of M7 railcars with batteries for travel in diesel territory, pending feasibility studies.

== Accidents and incidents ==
- On February 3, 2015, an M7A train on Metro-North's Harlem Line was involved in a grade crossing collision with a car stopped on the tracks in Valhalla, New York. The driver of the car and five passengers on the train were killed and at least fifteen were injured. Car 4333 was destroyed in the subsequent fire.
- On October 8, 2016, an M7 train on the Long Island Rail Road's Port Jefferson Branch sideswiped a work train near the New Hyde Park station. Multiple cars – 7033, 7034, and 7044 – were seriously damaged and eventually scrapped. Car 7043, which was 7044's mate, was initially stored but was later remated with car 7554 after that car lost its mate.
- On January 4, 2017, an M7 train on the Long Island Rail Road's Atlantic Branch overshot a bumper at Atlantic Terminal's track 6. More than 100 people were injured. Car 7553 was seriously damaged in the collision – a broken rail pierced the underbody, creating a large hole – and was eventually scrapped. Its mate 7554 was mated with car 7043, which also lost its mate.
- On July 21, 2018, an M7 train stored in the Long Island Rail Road's West Side Yard derailed. Two cars, 7019 and 7364, were damaged and were eventually scrapped.
- On February 26, 2019, an M7 train on the Long Island Rail Road's Ronkonkoma Branch struck a truck, causing the lead car to derail and strike the Westbury station platform. Car 7425 was seriously damaged as a result and was eventually scrapped. Three people in the truck were killed, while there were no fatalities on the train. The individuals were fleeing the scene of a motor vehicle accident and went around lowered railroad crossing gates. Car 7426 was mated with car 7279 after the crash.
- Car 7054 had its front burned in a fire and was scrapped in 2023.
- On January 28, 2026, Metro-North M7A car 4041 caught fire from its undercarriage at Scarsdale station on the Harlem Line
- On February 2, 2026, LIRR car 7070 was badly damaged from a fire, after hitting a car on the Little East Neck Rd crossing between Pinelawn and Wyandanch stations on the Ronkonkoma Branch. Car 7069, which was mated to 7070, was later remated with car 7462.

== Gallery ==
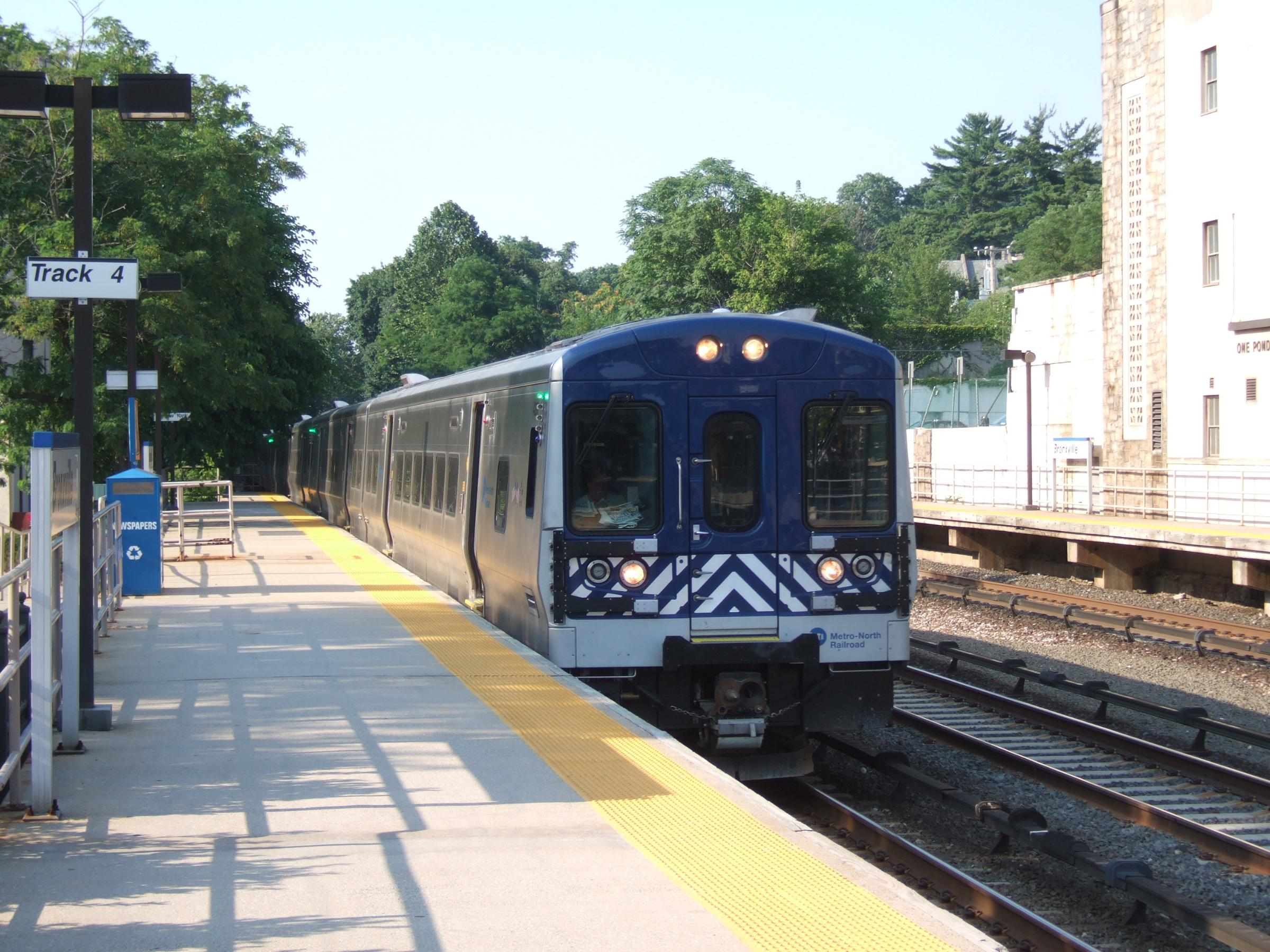
A Metro-North M7A entering Bronxville station

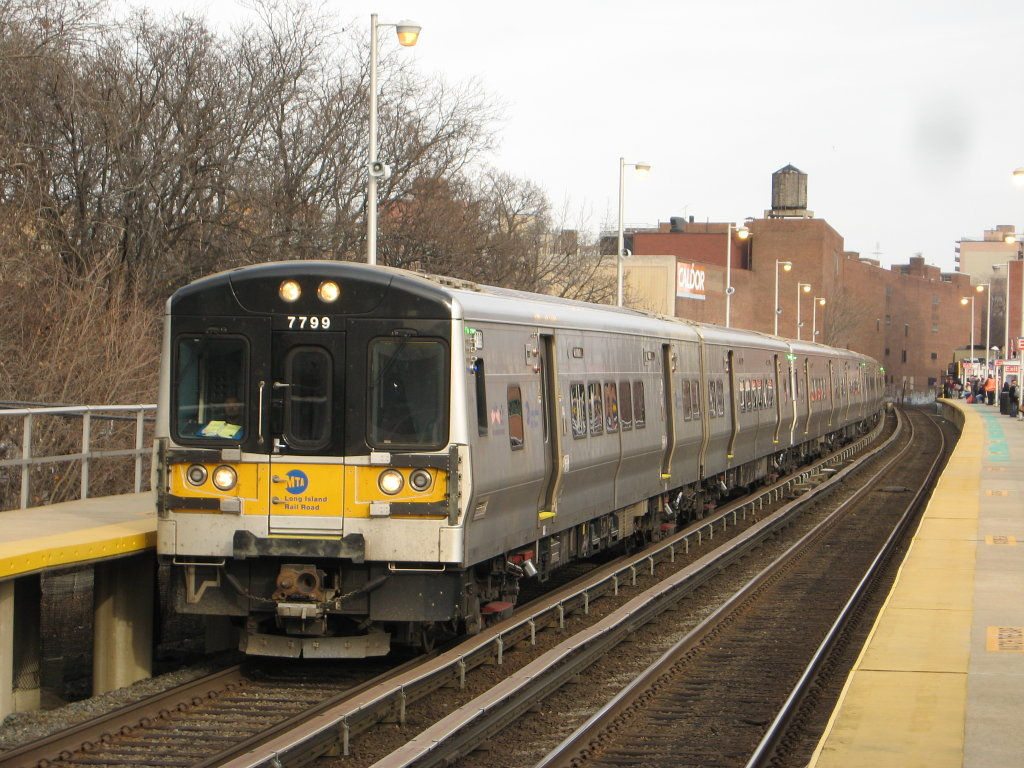
An LIRR M7 arriving at Flushing–Main Street

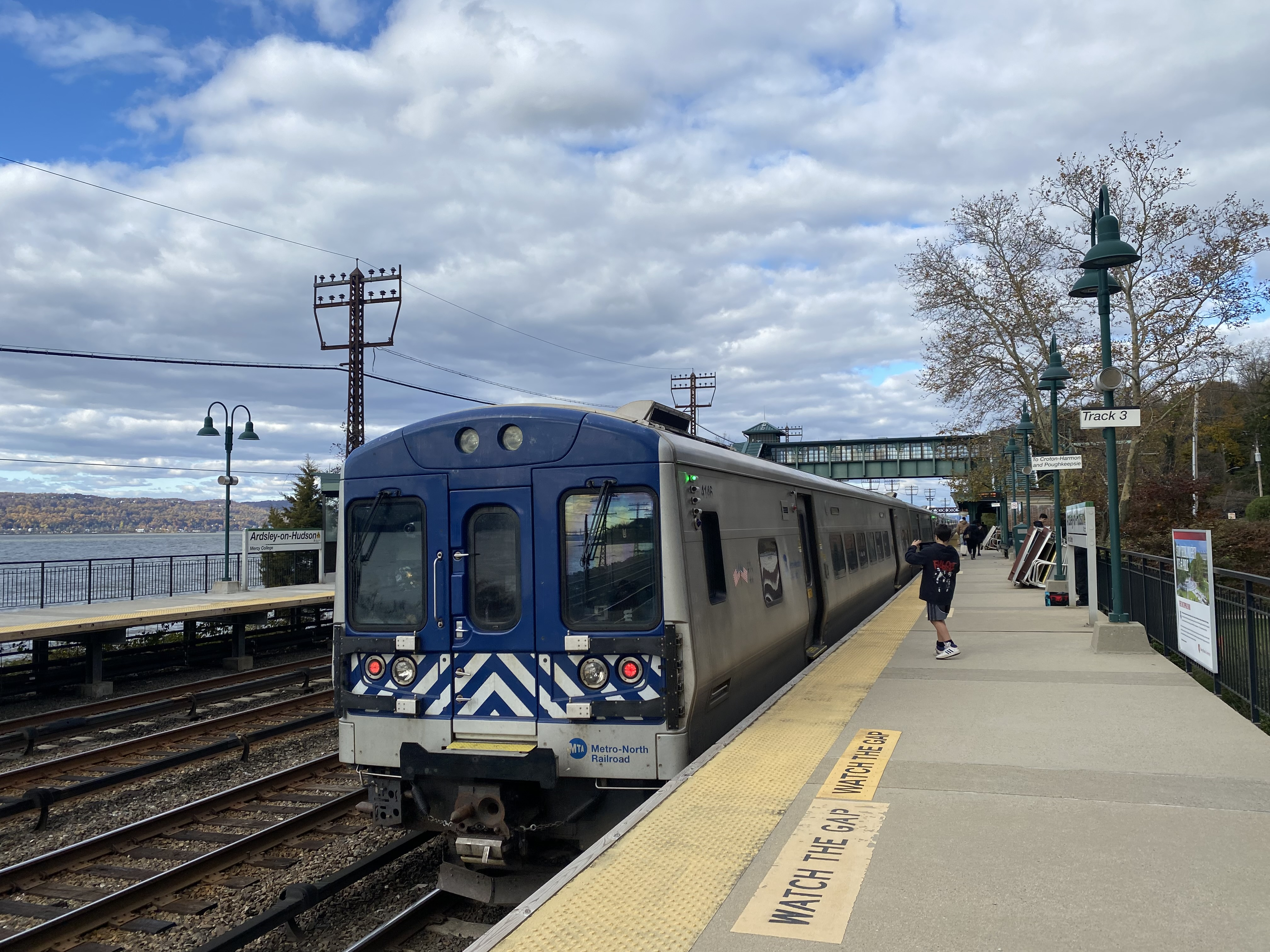
An 8 car M7A prepares for departure at Ardsley-on-Hudson station, heading towards Croton–Harmon station just 6 stations away. Car 4146 is seen trailing, with 4309 and 4308 leading the train

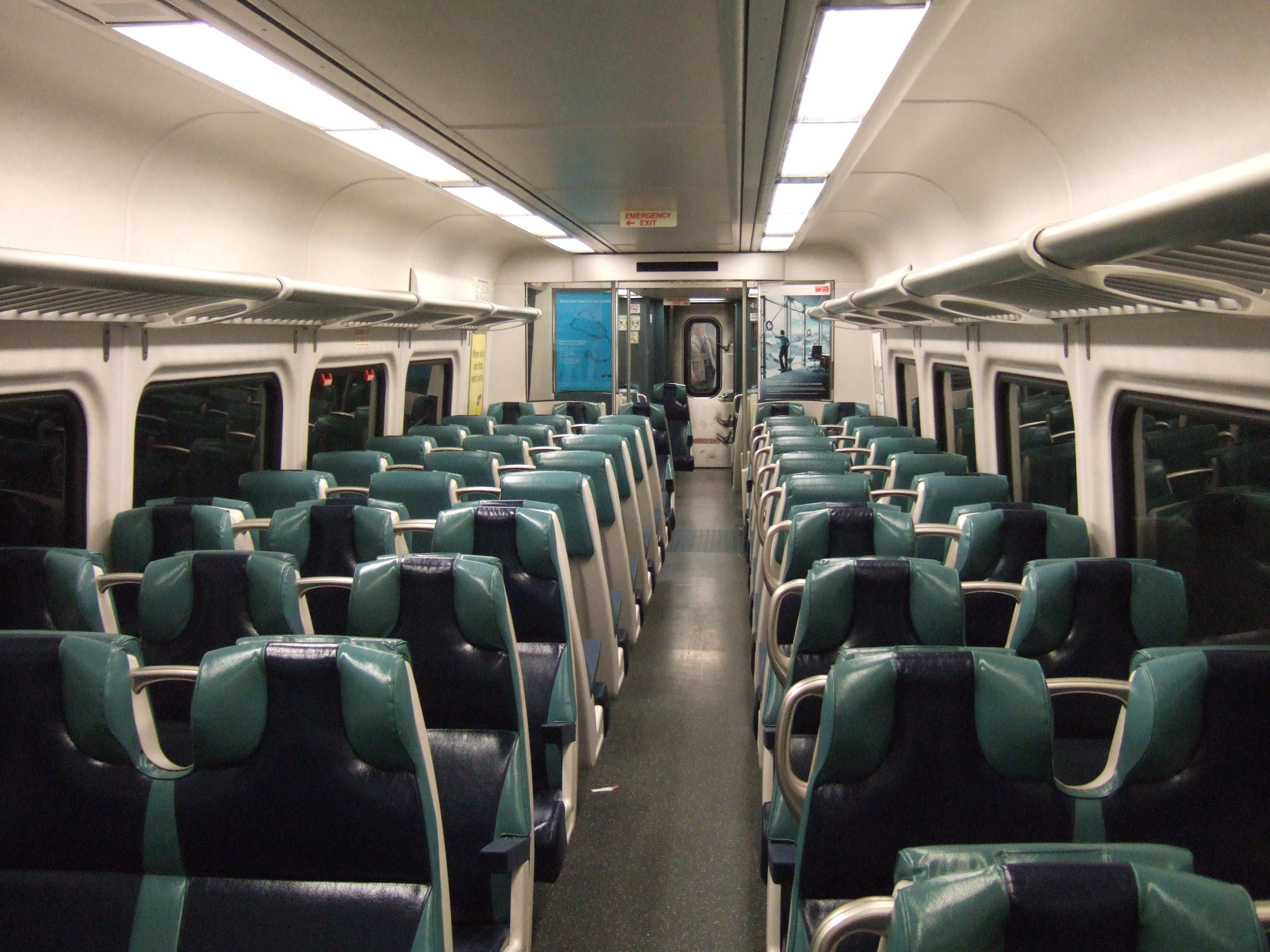
Interior of an M7A car

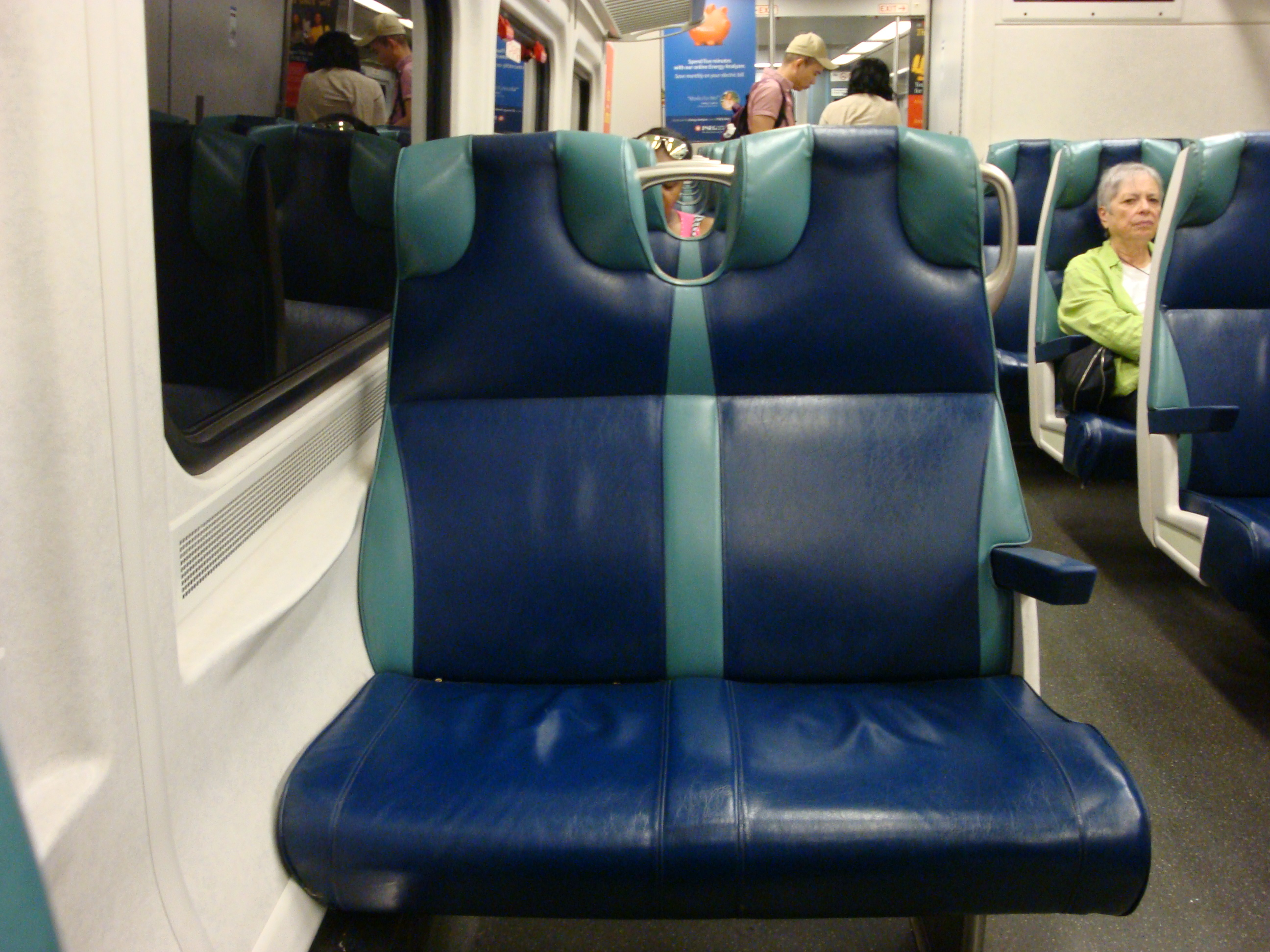
Seats in LIRR M7 cars

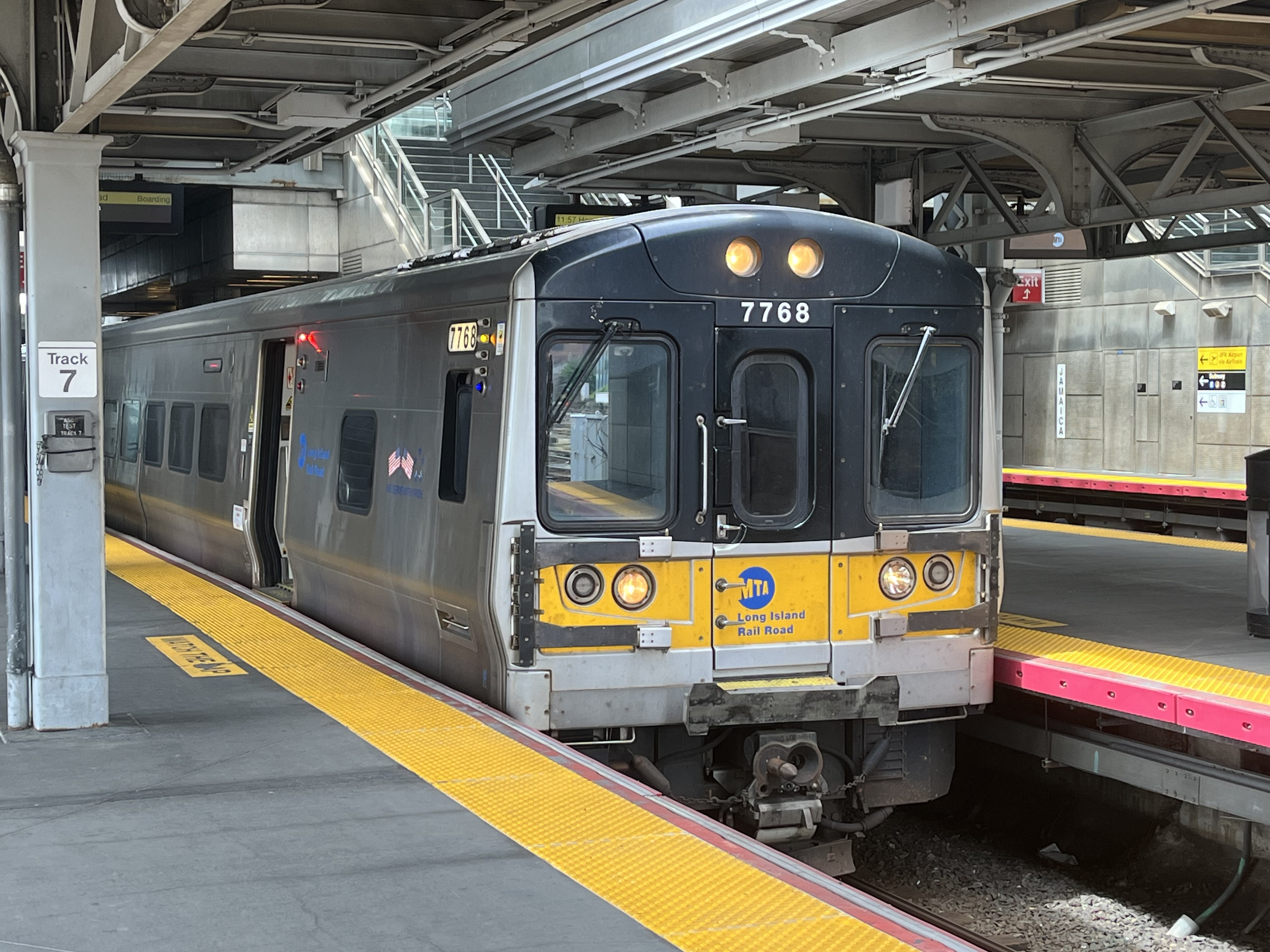
LIRR M7 at Jamaica on Track 7 (May 2024)

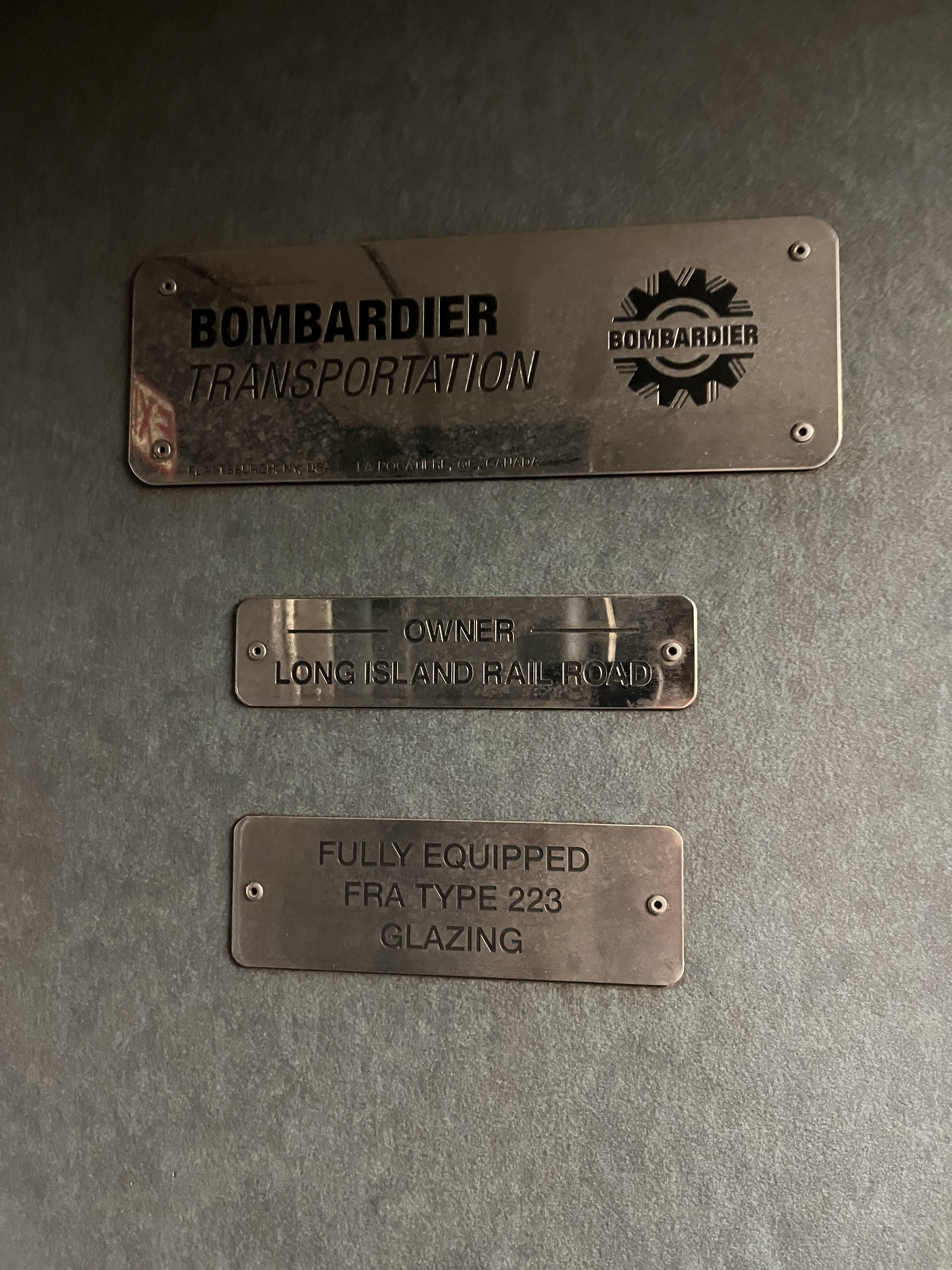
Builders plate of the M7s

== See also ==
- M1/M3 (railcar)
- M8 (railcar)
- M9 (railcar)
- Long Island Rail Road
- Metro-North Railroad
