= Hollis station =

Long Island Rail Road station in Queens, New York

Hollis
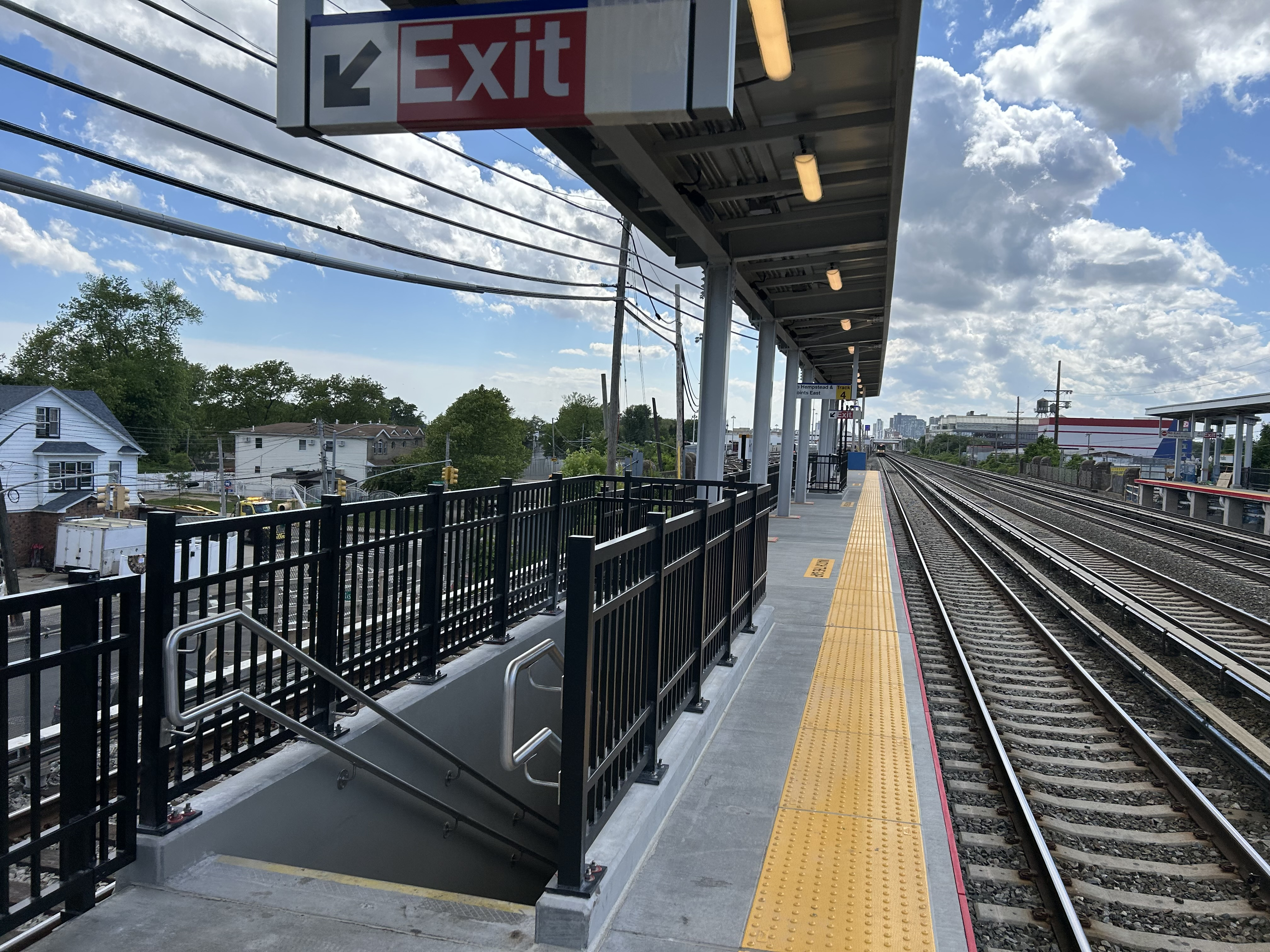
- The Hollis station in 2026

General information
- Location: 193rd Street and Woodhull Avenue; Hollis, Queens, New York
- Coordinates: 40.7102°N 73.7666°W
- Owner: Long Island Rail Road
- Line: Main Line
- Distance: 11.5 mi (18.5 km) from Long Island City
- Platforms: 2 side platforms
- Tracks: 5 (1 for yard access)
- Connections: NYCT Bus: Q2, Q3; MTA Bus: Q110

Construction
- Parking: No
- Accessible: No; accessibility improvements underway

Other information
- Station code: HOL
- Fare zone: 3

History
- Opened: May 1885
- Rebuilt: 1915, 1990s
- Electrified: 750 V (DC) third rail
- Former names: East Jamaica (May–September 1885)

Passengers
- 2012—2014: 413 per weekday

Services
Preceding station	Long Island Rail Road	Following station
Jamaica toward Penn Station, Grand Central or Atlantic Terminal	Hempstead Branch	Queens Village toward Hempstead
Jamaica toward Penn Station	Port Jefferson Branch weekends	Queens Village toward Huntington
Belmont Park Branch does not stop here
Oyster Bay Branch does not stop here
Ronkonkoma Branch does not stop here
Montauk Branch does not stop here
Former services
Preceding station	Long Island Rail Road	Following station
Rockaway Junction toward Long Island City or Penn Station	Main Line	Bellaire toward Greenport
Location

Hollis is a station on the Long Island Rail Road's Main Line, located at the intersection of 193rd Street and Woodhull Avenue in the Hollis neighborhood of Queens, New York City. Hempstead Branch trains primarily serve the station, with additional hourly service provided by Port Jefferson Branch trains on weekends.

== History ==
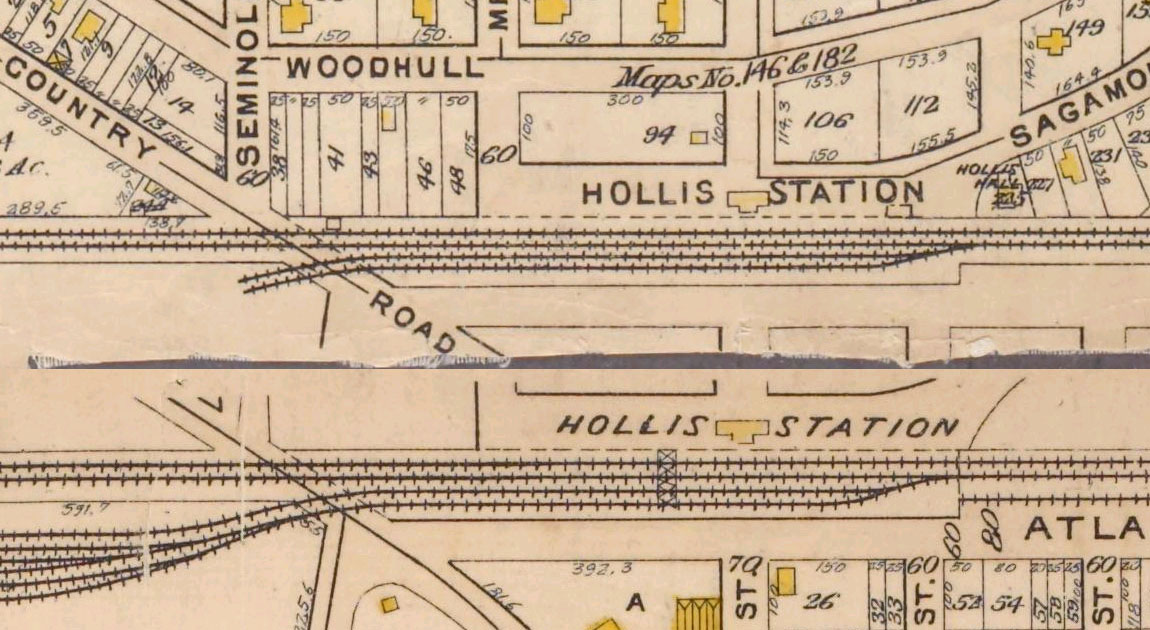
1909 map of Hollis station

The station was originally built as East Jamaica in May 1885 and was renamed as Hollis in September of the same year. It was rebuilt in 1915, as part of a grade crossing elimination project.

On June 22, 1958, five of 25 eastbound Hempstead Branch trains, and six of 26 westbound trains began skipping the station, reducing running times on those trains by one minute. Daily ridership at the station had decreased from 3,396 in 1930 to 230 in 1957.

The station house was destroyed by arson on November 2, 1967, and was never rebuilt; it now operates without a station house, with open-air shelters on the platforms providing passengers protection from the elements.

As part of the Metropolitan Transportation Authority's 2020–-2024 capital plan, the station was to undergo extensive renovations – in addition to being made fully ADA-accessible. One elevator and one ramp would be constructed to provide access to both platforms; the existing, deteriorated platforms would be demolished and replaced; the pedestrian underpass would be modified; platform canopies would replace the station shelters; artwork will be added; and lighting and architectural finishes will be upgraded. Additionally, the station's new platforms would allow for either six or eight cars on a train to platform – an increase from the original platforms' four car lengths. The MTA board awarded contracts for the accessibility upgrades in December 2023. Work on the project was briefly paused in mid-2024 due to the temporary postponement of congestion pricing in New York City, which will help fund the renovations, but has since resumed. The project is expected to be completed by the end of 2026.

== Station layout ==
This station has two high-level wooden side platforms, each four cars long. The two middle tracks, not next to either platform, are used by through trains on the Port Jefferson, Ronkonkoma, Oyster Bay, and Montauk branches. A fifth track south of the southern platform leads to the east end of the Hillside Facility and does not carry passenger service.

The station's only entrance is a pedestrian tunnel under the platforms and tracks that has a staircase to each platform and leads to 193rd Street and 99th Avenue on its south end and the dead-end of 193rd Street on its north end. Along the north platform is a pedestrian roadway that leads to 191st Street on its west end and Sagamore Avenue on its east end.

== See also ==
- List of Long Island Rail Road stations
