= Bellaire station =

Train station in New York City (1837–1972)

Bellaire

General information
- Location: 212th Street between 99th Avenue and Jamaica Avenue; Bellaire, Queens, New York
- Coordinates: 40°42′52.73″N 73°44′52.92″W
- Owner: Long Island Rail Road
- Line: Main Line

History
- Opened: November 27, 1837; June 1897
- Closed: 1871; June 26, 1972
- Rebuilt: 1924
- Electrified: September 22, 1905; 750 V (DC) third rail
- Former names: Brushville Road (1897–1900); Interstate Park (1900–1907)

Former services
Preceding station	Long Island Rail Road	Following station
Hollis toward Long Island City or Penn Station	Main Line	Queens Village toward Greenport
Hollis toward Floral Park	Hempstead Branch	Queens Village toward Hempstead
Location

Bellaire was a station stop along the Hempstead Branch of the Long Island Rail Road. The station was located between 211th Street and 212th Street between 99th Avenue and Jamaica Avenue in Bellaire, Queens.

The station was first opened in 1837 as Brushville, which opened as a replacement of a station further to the east. The station closed in 1871, and was reopened in 1897 as Brushville Road. This station was replaced by Interstate Park in 1900, and was renamed Bellaire in 1907. The station was rebuilt on an elevated structure in 1924 as part of a grade crossing elimination project, and was closed in 1972 due to low ridership.

== History ==
=== Brushville station ===
With the opening of the Long Island Rail Road Main Line from Jamaica to Hicksville on March 1, 1837, De Lancey Avenue station was opened, located in the vicinity of where Queens Village station is today at Springfield Boulevard. The station was constructed 4 miles (6.4 km) east of Jamaica.

On November 27, 1837, this station was replaced by Brushville station, located between Hempstead Turnpike, and what later became known as First Avenue and 212th Street. This station was renamed Queens from 1852 to 1856. The station was discontinued on October 19, 1871 as it was replaced by a permanent station known as Inglewood station. That station was built at Springfield Road (later Boulevard) by Colonel A. M. Wood on land across from his estate that he sold to the LIRR.

The Main Line was double-tracked to Hicksville in 1890, passing through the area.

An 1895 map showed a proposed new station at First Avenue. Brushville station reopened as Brushville Road at First Avenue in June 1897.

=== Interstate Park/Bellaire station ===
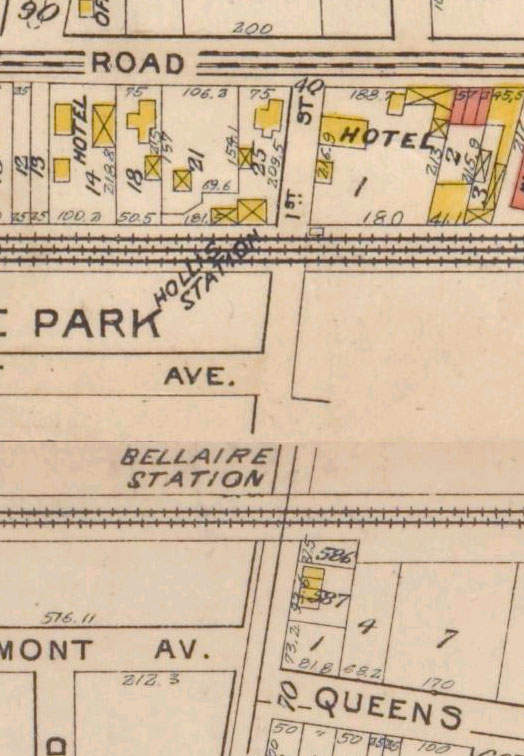
Map from 1909 showing the former location of the station

In February 1900, the LIRR filed plans to construct a frame depot station called Interstate Park to replace Brushville Road on the south side of the tracks to serve the grounds of the Interstate Park Association. Interstate Park was a shooting range and casino operated by the National Trapshooting Association. At its annual Grand American tournament, flying birds were released from their cages and shot by trained marksmen. The station opened on March 20, 1900, although it only served the Hempstead Branch. Interstate Park declared bankruptcy in 1902 after New York State passed a law prohibiting pigeon-shooting competitions.

Interstate Park was sold for residential development in 1906. The station was renamed "Bellaire" in 1907, following a request by developer Parvin Harbaugh. As part of the development of Bellaire in 1907, a wide road, known a Bellaire Boulevard, with a green median, now known as Mall 211, was constructed connecting to the station. It was given a green median with nine traffic islands serving as a centerpiece of the planned suburban community.

The line was electrified to Queens Village and Belmont Park on September 22, 1905. That year, a third track was added from Hollis to Queens, passing through the station.

=== Grade crossing elimination ===
On December 8, 1911, the New York Public Service Commission (PSC) adopted an order requiring the Long Island Rail Road to eliminate grade crossings at Hempstead Turnpike, Madison Avenue, Creed Avenue (Springfield Boulevard), Wertland Avenue, and Bennett Avenue. In October 1923, the LIRR submitted detailed plans for the five bridges that would be constructed to eliminate these crossings to the PSC, and in November 1923, the PSC approved these plans. On May 22, 1923, New York City and the LIRR agreed on a plan to extend Cross Island Boulevard and Bellaire Boulevard under the rail line, which would be elevated.

Work on the Queens Elimination Project, which extended from a point 2,000 feet (610 m) west of Bellerose station to Hollis station, was completed in 1924. As part of the project, five grade crossings, at Hempstead Turnpike, Springfield Boulevard, Bennet Avenue, Wertland Avenue, and Madison Avenue, were eliminated by placing the line on an embankment and constructing bridges, and two new streets were extended underneath the line, at Bellaire Boulevard and Cross Island Boulevard. In addition, the line was four-tracked and electrification was extended to Floral Park. Bellaire and Queens stations were rebuilt with concrete high-level platforms that could accommodate eleven-car trains. Pedestrian subways were constructed between platforms at Floral Park and Bellerose, station platforms at Hillside and Hollis were extended new interlockings were installed at Floral Park and Queens, and an automatic block signaling system was installed between Floral Park and Hillside. Telephone and telegraph lines were constructed as part of the project, as was a freight yard at Queens, and a storage yard east of Floral Park for electric local trains. On December 17, 1923, the first track on the embankment opened for service in the westbound direction. On January 7, 1924, a second track, an eastbound one, opened for service, increasing the completion of the project to 60 percent. With the opening of this track, service in both directions was relocated from the previous level, 20 feet (6.1 m) below the embankment level, to the embankment, allowing the old tracks to be discontinued, and for five grade crossings to be closed. In February 1924, work on the project was expected to be completed in May, though it was substantially completed in December. The new station at Bellaire opened on September 20, 1924 with high-level platforms. The project to eliminate the five grade crossings cost $2,500,000, while the project to extend Cross Island Boulevard under the line cost $75,000, and the project to do the same for Bellaire Boulevard (211th Street) cost $60,000. The entire cost of the project ended up being $2,760,000. A quarter of the $2,500,000 cost of the elimination of the five crossings was paid for by the State, while the cost of the new streets carried across the rail line was paid for by the City and the LIRR. The cost of four-tracking the line, and the construction of stations and other facilities was paid for by the LIRR. The line was elevated by carrying the line on a high fill embankment with steel and concrete bridges at street crossings. The State made three payments of $248,000, and the City made its first payment of $70,000, but objected to the second and third payments, totaling $178,000, as it questioned the legality of the LIRR's addition of tracks as part of the project.

The mapped out route for Cross Island Boulevard and Bellaire Boulevard extended across the tracks, but the section crossing the tracks had not been opened. The 100 foot (30 m)-wide streets would be carried under the new elevated line. The clearance between the streets and the railroad line would be 13 to 14 feet (4.0 to 4.3 m). As part of the project, Bellaire station was moved from being just west of Bennett Avenue, to extending from Bennett Avenue to Bellaire Boulevard. The original plan from 1923 called for a station long enough to accommodate eight-car trains.

On February 25, 1930, the Long Island Rail Road announced that additional trains would stop at Bellaire starting on March 3, following months of requests by the Bellaire Taxpayers Association. The request was granted due to the growth of the neighborhood. Eight more eastbound Hempstead Branch trains, which had already been stopping at Queens Village and Hollis, would stop daily and Sundays, and ten additional trains would stop on Saturdays heading east. Eight additional westbound trains would be added daily and on Sundays in June.

At a joint hearing of the PSC and the New York State Transit Commission on February 17, 1930, the Bellaire Community Association filed a petition requesting 16 additional rush hour trains stopping at the station, and 18 additional trains on Sunday. A counsel for the PSC found there was an 80 minute gap in service at the station, and that 76 people from the station boarded the train arriving at the station following the gap. He urged that the PSC to order the LIRR to improve service to the station. A Trainmaster for the LIRR denied that the quality of service at Bellaire was poor, but noted that some additional service could be provided to the station without inflicting hardship on service. The station, at the time, was served by 49 westbound and 56 eastbound trains on weekdays.

On May 9, 1936, a fire started at the station, causing $500's worth of damage. Multiple fires took place across Queens and Nassau County early on December 2, 1940 in ten degree weather, including a fire that damaged Bellaire station. The fire required the station to be temporarily closed for repairs and the relocation of its ticket office to a nearby store.

=== Closing ===
The station's agency was discontinued in 1968—1969.

On March 4, 1971, a representative of the Bellaire Taxpayers Association met with Long Island Rail Road officials to present a petition signed by 1,000 residents protesting the station's threatened closure. An LIRR spokesperson said that the railroad was leaning towards closing the station, but had not yet made a decision. The spokesperson cited a recent fire at the station, which caused significant damage, and said ridership at the station had been decreasing in recent years.

On June 18, 1972, the Long Island Rail Road announced a major change in train schedules to take place on all ten branches of the LIRR. As part of the changes, three stations with low ridership, Bellaire, South Farmingdale, and Landia, would be closed on June 26. The station was used by over 100 daily riders, and a railroad spokesperson said the cost of maintaining the station exceeded fare revenue from the station.

The potential closure of Bellaire was first reported eighteen months prior. On June 23, 1972, the Bellaire Commuters' Association won a court order from Queens Supreme Court Justice William G. Giaccio to enjoin the LIRR from closing the station on June 26 until a hearing took place that morning in which the Association could make its case to keep the station open. The order kept the station for an additional half day, with three trains leaving for Penn Station at 6:55 a.m., 7:22 a.m., and 7:40 a.m., and three trains leaving for Flatbush Avenue Terminal at 7:58 a.m., 8:23 a.m., and 8:56 a.m.

The Association submitted a petition to the railroad with 1,000 signatures opposing the closing. Queens Borough President Donald Manes also sent a letter to William Ronan, chairman of the Metropolitan Transportation Authority (MTA), saying that the MTA should reconsider its decision to close the station, considering the need to reduce car use due to pollution. The president of the Bellaire Commuters' Association, Mary Lennon, said that it made more sense to have area residents walk to the Bellaire station than having them drive to the nearby Hollis or Queens Village stations, both about 1 mile (1.6 km) away, causing more congestion. The Queens Supreme Court dismissed the Association's case, and the station closed on June 26, 1972.

== Station layout ==
Bellaire station had four tracks and two elevated side platforms. There originally were station houses on both platforms. Staircases covered by canopies used to lead from both platforms to 211th Street and 212th Street. The station was demolished between 1985 and 1994.

Nothing remains of the station except the concrete platform supports visible on both sides of the local tracks. At the time of its closing, the station had no ticket office.
