= Bellerose station =

Long Island Rail Road station in Nassau County, New York

Bellerose
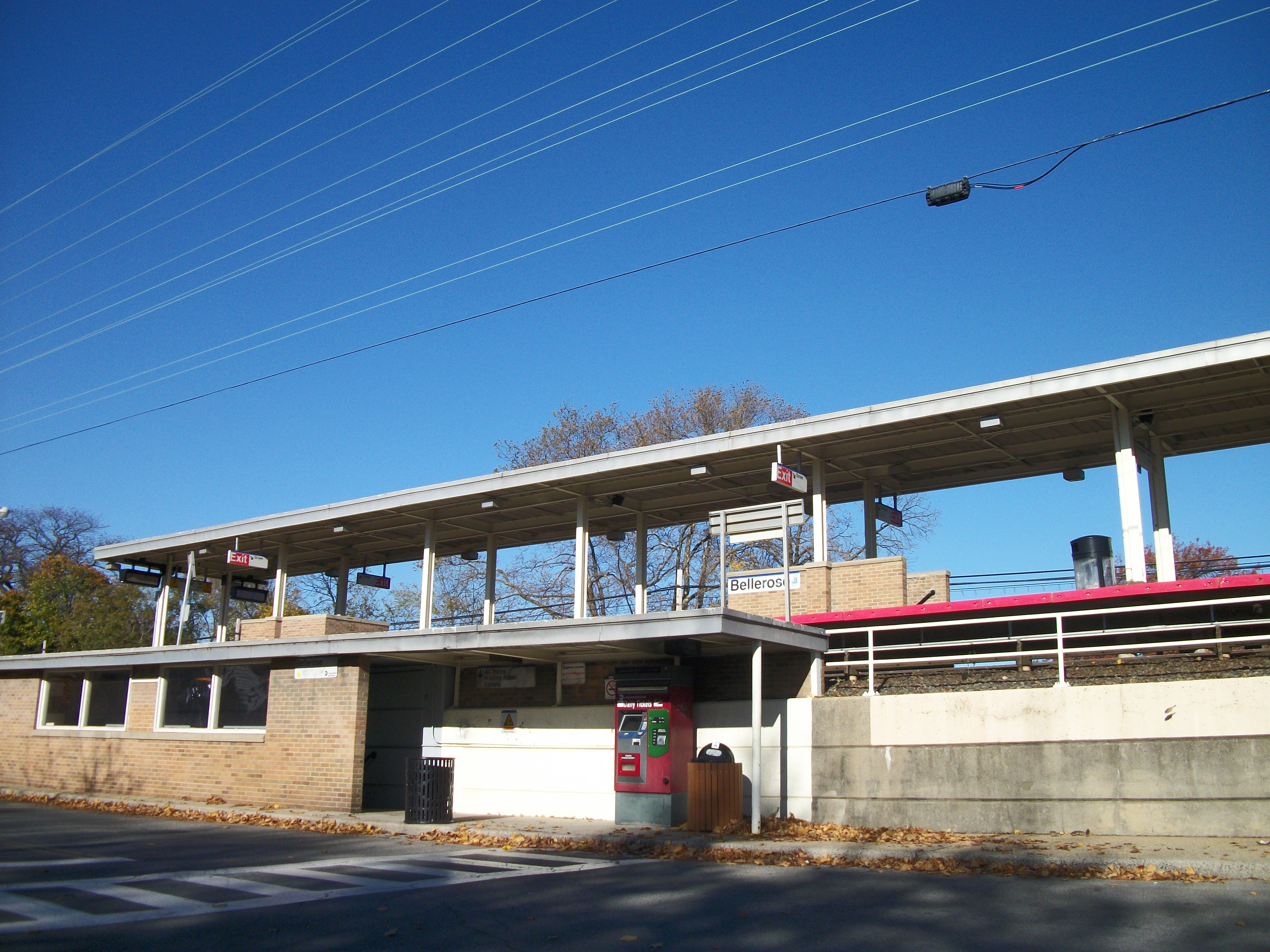
- The Bellerose station, seen from along Atlantic Avenue

General information
- Location: Commonwealth Boulevard & Superior Road; Bellerose and Floral Park, New York
- Coordinates: 40.7221°N 73.7166°W
- Owner: Long Island Rail Road
- Lines: Main Line; Hempstead Branch
- Distance: 14.3 mi (23.0 km) from Long Island City
- Platforms: 1 island platform
- Tracks: 4 (2 on the Hempstead Branch, and 3 on the Main Line, 1 track shared by both the Hempstead Branch and Main Line)
- Connections: New York City Bus: Q36; MTA Bus: Q110 (at Jericho Turnpike); Nassau Inter-County Express: n24 (at Jericho Turnpike)

Construction
- Parking: Yes
- Accessible: No; accessibility improvements underway

Other information
- Station code: BRS
- Fare zone: 4

History
- Opened: 1898
- Rebuilt: 1909, 1960–1961
- Electrified: 750 V (DC) third rail

Passengers
- 2012—2014: 1,278 per weekday

Services
Preceding station	Long Island Rail Road	Following station
Elmont–UBS Arena toward Penn Station, Grand Central or Atlantic Terminal	Hempstead Branch	Floral Park toward Hempstead
Port Jefferson Branch does not stop here
Oyster Bay Branch does not stop here
Ronkonkoma Branch does not stop here
Montauk Branch does not stop here
Former services
Preceding station	Long Island Rail Road	Following station
Queens Village toward Long Island City or Penn Station	Main Line	Floral Park toward Greenport
Location

Bellerose station is a commuter rail station along the Main Line and Hempstead Branch of the Long Island Rail Road, located in the incorporated villages of Bellerose and Floral Park, in Nassau County, New York. The station is at Commonwealth Boulevard and Superior Road, 0.25 miles (0.40 km) south of Jericho Turnpike (NY 25).

The station has a full-service ticket vending machine, which is located at the north entrance to the station, in addition to a daily ticket vending machine, which is located at the south entrance.

== History ==
Bellerose station was originally built in 1898 and rebuilt in the summer of 1909. It was out of service between December 12–15, 1960, and replaced with a third station between 1960 and 1961. Until 1960, the station had a platform on each side of the four-track Main Line, though almost all trains that stopped ran to and from Hempstead.

As part of the grade crossing elimination, the junction between the Main Line and Hempstead Branch was moved west of Bellerose. The two lines remain closely parallel to each other, along the same right-of-way, between Jamaica and Floral Park. The platform was placed between the two Hempstead Branch tracks.

=== 21st century ===
The station is set to undergo a modernization project in the 2020s, as part of the MTA's 2025–2029 Capital Plan. The project will include making the station wheelchair accessible and updating the station's infrastructure and components. In 2026, the wheelchair accessibility project received $250,000 in federal funds.

== Station layout ==
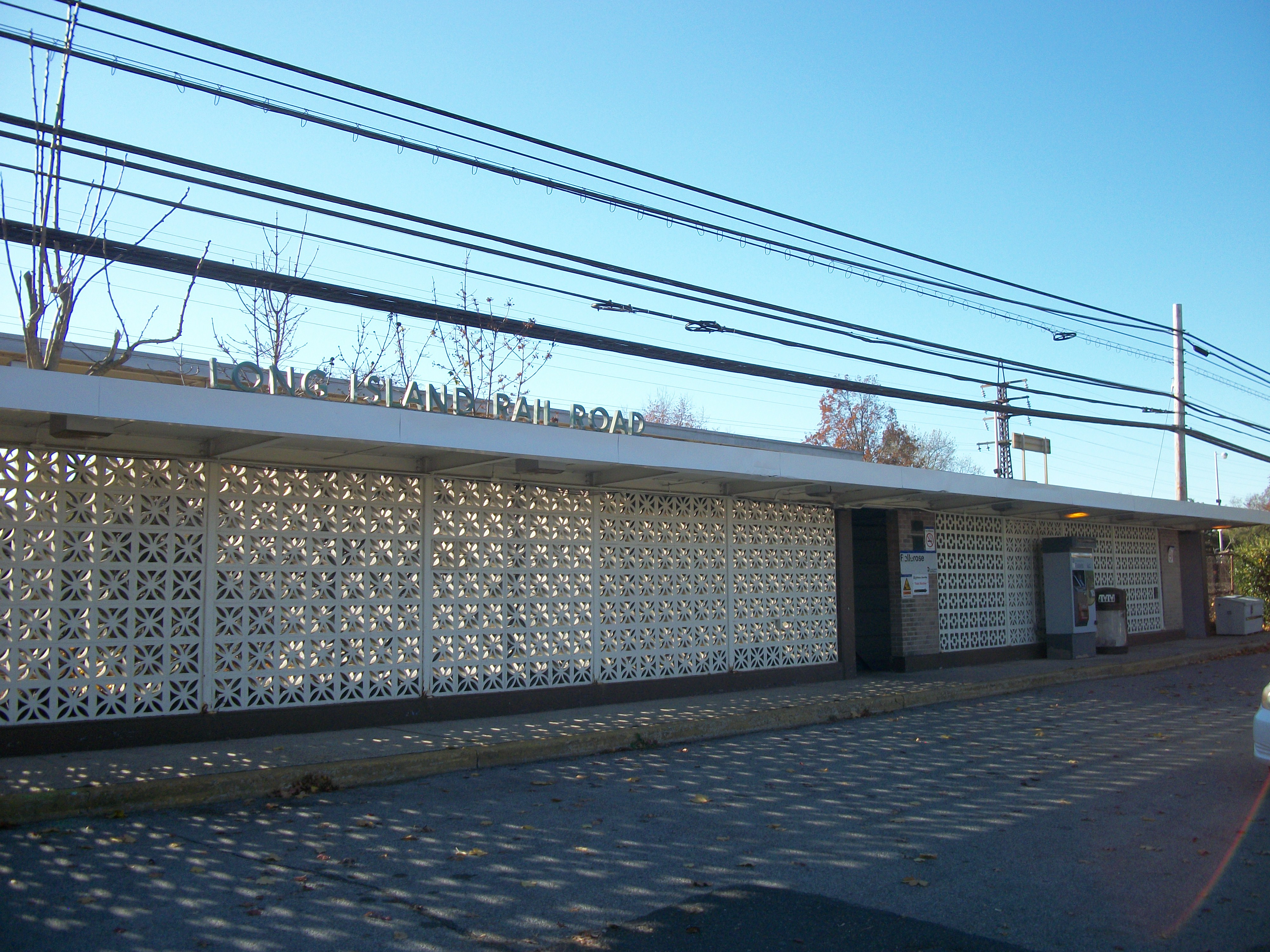
The station entrance from the parking lot, located on the north side of the tracks

The station has one eight-car-long high-level island platform serving the two southern tracks (tracks 2 & 4, north to south). Main Line trains (the Port Jefferson, Oyster Bay, Ronkonkoma, and Montauk Branches) bypass the station using the two northern tracks (tracks 3 & 1, north to south), while Hempstead Branch trains use the two southern tracks.

=== Connections ===
The station is served by the Q36, Q110, and the n24 bus routes along Jericho Turnpike a few blocks to the north, and local taxis stop directly in front of the station.

== See also ==
- List of Long Island Rail Road stations
- Bellerose Village Municipal Complex – The Village of Bellerose's municipal government complex, located adjacent to the station.
- Floral Park station
