= Elmont–UBS Arena station =

Long Island Rail Road station in Nassau County, New York

Elmont UBS Arena
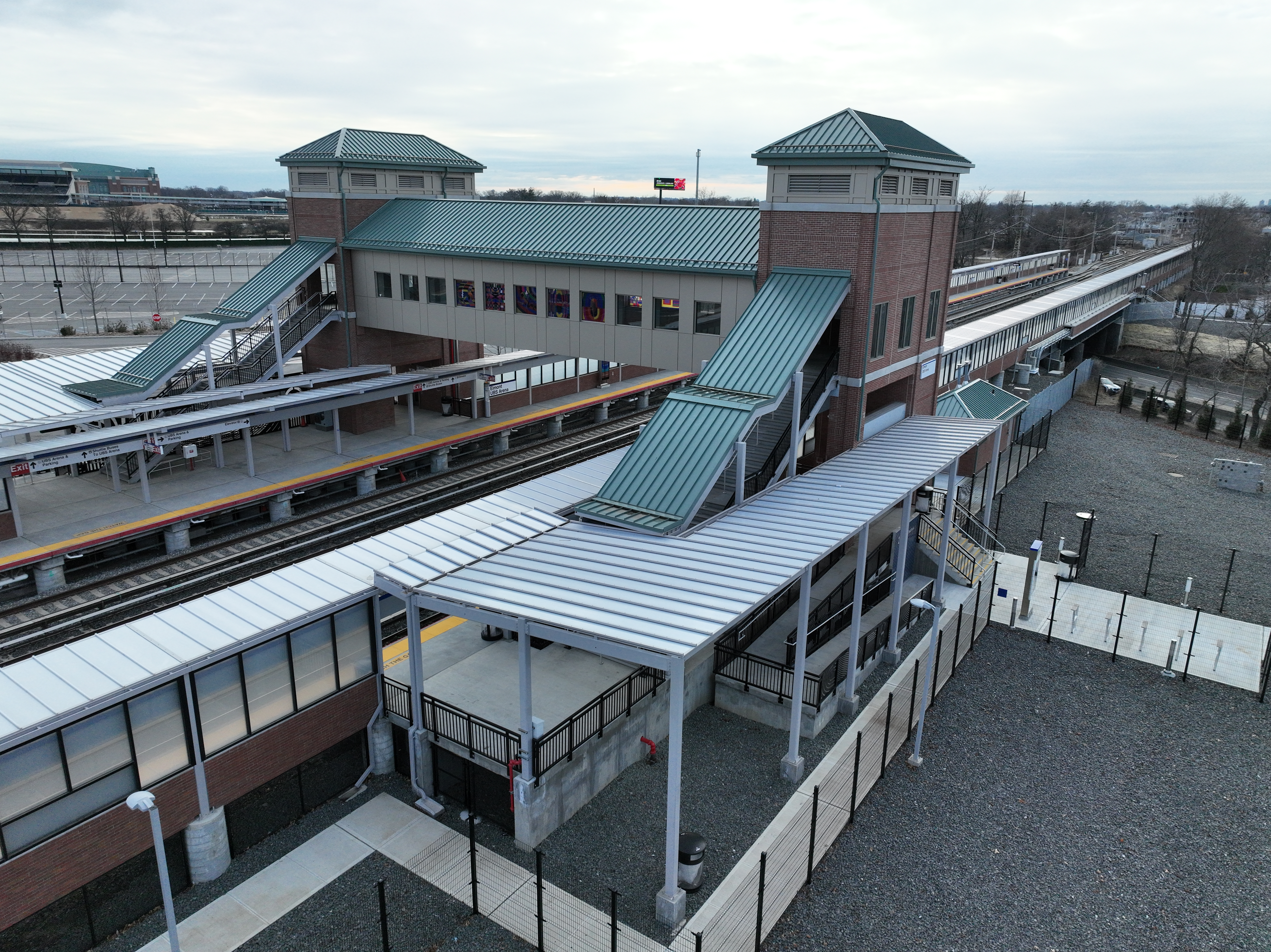
- The Elmont–UBS Arena station in 2023

General information
- Location: Superior Road; Elmont & Bellerose Terrace, New York
- Coordinates: 40.720007°N 73.726182°W
- Owner: Long Island Rail Road
- Line: Main Line
- Platforms: 2 side platforms
- Tracks: 4
- Connections: New York City Bus: Q2, Q36, Q82; MTA Bus: Q110; Nassau Inter-County Express: n1, n6, n24

Construction
- Cycle facilities: Yes
- Accessible: Yes

Other information
- Station code: EMT
- Fare zone: 4

History
- Opened: November 20, 2021 (eastbound service, event days only); October 6, 2022 (westbound service)

Services
Preceding station	Long Island Rail Road	Following station
Queens Village toward Penn Station, Grand Central or Atlantic Terminal	Hempstead Branch	Bellerose toward Hempstead
Jamaica toward Penn Station, Grand Central or Long Island City	Port Jefferson Branch limited service	Floral Park toward Huntington or Port Jefferson
Jamaica toward Penn Station or Grand Central	Ronkonkoma Branch limited service	Mineola toward Ronkonkoma
Oyster Bay Branch does not stop here
Montauk Branch does not stop here
Location

Elmont–UBS Arena (also known as Elmont) is a station along the Main Line of the Long Island Rail Road (LIRR) in Elmont and Bellerose Terrace, New York, just east of the Nassau County border with the New York City borough of Queens.

== Overview ==
The Elmont–UBS Arena station serves the LIRR Main Line and was built as part of the redevelopment of Belmont Park, which included the construction of the UBS Arena for the NHL's New York Islanders hockey team. The station opened for eastbound service in November 2021 and westbound service in October 2022.

== History ==
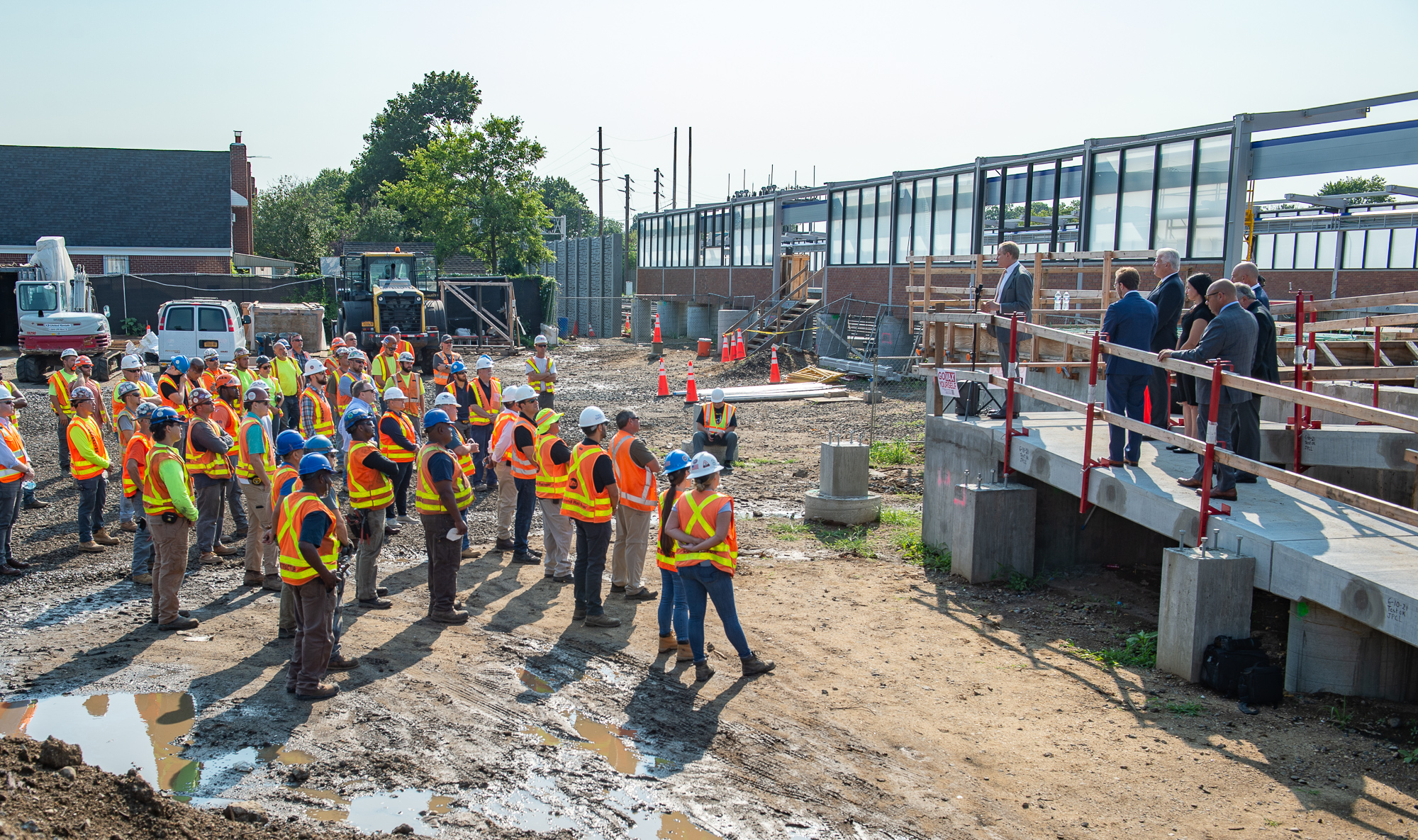
Construction of the station in July 2021

Plans for the station were first announced in July 2019 by then-New York governor Andrew Cuomo. New York Arena Partners, the main party behind the Belmont Park redevelopment, would pay $97 million of the estimated $105 million cost, with the balance being paid by the state. The station was the first completely new LIRR station since 1976, when the now-dismantled Southampton College station opened. The project was seen as a vital part of the Belmont Park redevelopment project. Though the Elmont station serves a portion of Elmont that did not previously have full-time train service, opponents of UBS Arena have claimed that the station plans conceal the real motivation behind building the arena.

The LIRR's officials stated that they did not expect the new Elmont station to generate new commuter ridership – but that the station would instead result in a shift of existing riders living in Bellerose Terrace and Elmont who previously used other stations. With the operation of the Elmont station, existing levels of commuter service to other LIRR stations (e.g., Queens Village, Bellerose, Floral Park) has been maintained, and officials further stated that the addition of the Elmont–UBS Arena station would not result in an impact to commuter service.

On November 20, 2021, the eastbound platform opened for the Islanders' first game at UBS Arena that night. While construction of the westbound platform continued, customers were required to use free shuttle buses or walk to UBS Arena or Belmont Park station until the westbound platform opened the following year. The westbound platform officially opened on October 6, 2022, for the Islanders–Devils preseason game that night.

On February 8, 2023, the LIRR announced that the Elmont–UBS Arena station would be served by trains on the Port Jefferson Branch as far as Huntington and on the Ronkonkoma Branch, with limited service during peak hours and most trains stopping during weekday evening or weekend hours. As of April 2024, service is primarily provided by trains on the Hempstead Branch, with the Ronkonkoma and Port Jefferson Branches providing limited service.

== Station layout ==
The station has two 12-car-long side platforms, both of which are compliant with the Americans with Disabilities Act of 1990. Unlike the Belmont Park station directly to the south, it is served by Main Line trains from both the west and east. The station also includes platform canopies, LED signs, benches, USB charging ports, bike racks, and artwork.

The station is located directly east of (and partially over) the overpass across the Cross Island Parkway. The location of the station gives platform access on the Bellerose Terrace side via an overpass.

=== Shuttle buses ===
Shuttle buses provide service from the station to events at UBS Arena and to Belmont Park Village, an open-air outlet mall located on the south side of Belmont Park. The shuttle bus pick-up area is located on the south side of the station, next to the commuter parking lot. Paid daily parking is available in the commuter parking lot for Elmont residents who have purchased an annual permit.

== See also ==
- List of Long Island Rail Road stations
- Atlantic Terminal
- Mets–Willets Point station (LIRR)
- The Lighthouse Project
