= Queens Village station =

Long Island Rail Road station in Queens, New York

Queens Village
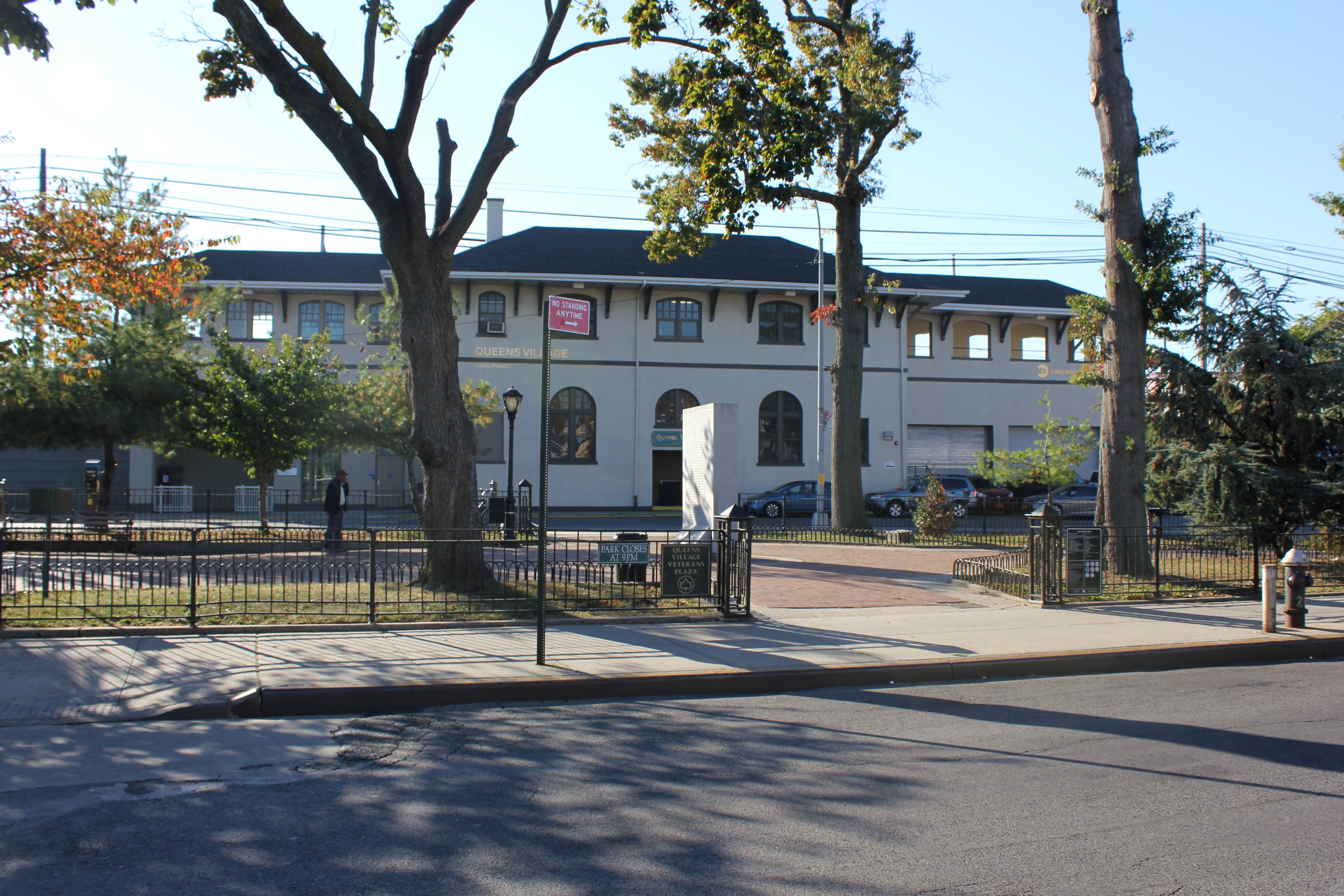
- The front entrance to Queens Village station, following its 2013 rehabilitation and modernization.

General information
- Location: Jamaica Avenue and Springfield Boulevard; Queens Village, Queens, New York
- Coordinates: 40.717469°N 73.73638°W
- Owner: Long Island Rail Road
- Lines: Main Line; Belmont Park Branch; Hempstead Branch
- Distance: 13.2 mi (21.2 km) from Long Island City
- Platforms: 2 side platforms
- Tracks: 5 (1 used for storage)
- Connections: New York City Bus: Q27, Q36, Q88; MTA Bus: Q110; Nassau Inter-County Express: n24

Construction
- Parking: Yes; Metered and Private
- Accessible: Yes

Other information
- Station code: QVG
- Fare zone: 3

History
- Opened: 1879
- Rebuilt: 1924, 2013
- Electrified: October 2, 1905? 750 V (DC) third rail
- Former names: Inglewood (1871–1879); Queens (1879–1924)

Passengers
- 2012—2014: 1,756 per weekday

Services
Preceding station	Long Island Rail Road	Following station
Hollis toward Penn Station, Grand Central or Atlantic Terminal	Hempstead Branch	Elmont–UBS Arena toward Hempstead
Hollis toward Penn Station	Port Jefferson Branch weekends	Elmont-UBS Arena toward Huntington
Belmont Park Branch does not stop here
Oyster Bay Branch does not stop here
Ronkonkoma Branch does not stop here
Montauk Branch does not stop here
Former services
Preceding station	Long Island Rail Road	Following station
Bellaire toward Long Island City or Penn Station	Main Line	Bellerose toward Greenport
Location

The Queens Village station is a commuter rail station on the Long Island Rail Road's Main Line, located between 218th Street and Springfield Boulevard, in the Queens Village neighborhood of Queens, New York City. It has two side platforms along the four-track line, and is served primarily by Hempstead Branch trains.

Just east of the station is Queens Interlocking, a universal interlocking that splits the four-track line into two parallel two-track lines—the Main Line and Hempstead Branch—and controls the junction with the spur to Belmont Park. The station is elevated and the tracks leading in and out are on raised ground and only above the road at intersections.

== History ==
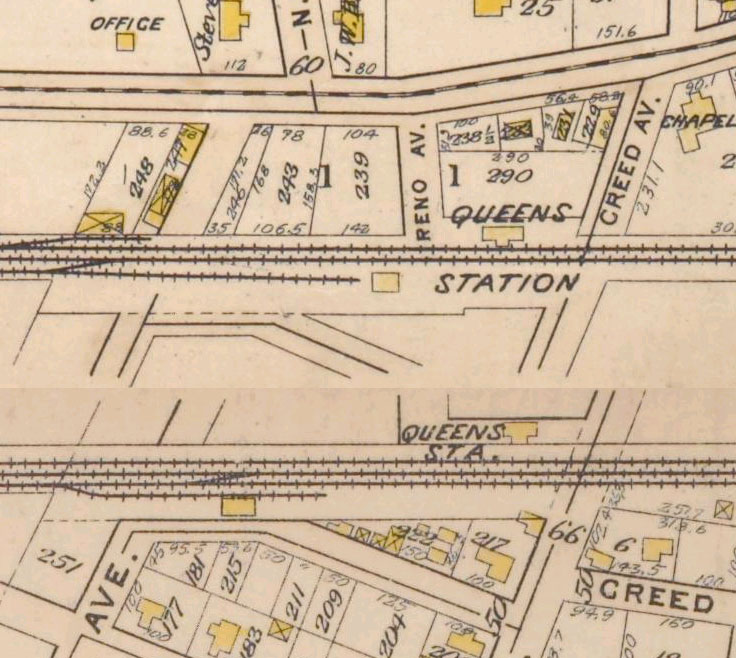
1909 Map of Queens (now Queens Village) station.

Between March and November 1837, the current site of Queens Village station was the site of an early Brooklyn and Jamaica Railroad station named Flushing Avenue station then renamed DeLancey Avenue station and later named Brushville station until it was moved to what is today 212th Street, the site of the former Bellaire station, which was used to serve Ben Lane's Hotel. By 1871, a new station was originally installed across Jericho Turnpike from the estate of Colonel A.M. Wood which was on the northwest corner of Springfield Boulevard. The estate was named "Inglewood," and the new station which resulted in the closing of the Brushville-Ben Lane's station was named for this estate.

Queens Village station originally opened at ground level as Queens station in 1879 (some sources say 1881). The original station house contained a sign with the distance to Long Island City and Greenport stations. The station house was moved to a private location as a new one was being built as part of a grade elimination project, and opened on September 24, 1924. It was then renamed "Queens Village." On October 30, 2013, the LIRR unveiled a renovated station, with passenger elevators, improved lighting, security cameras and a repainted building.

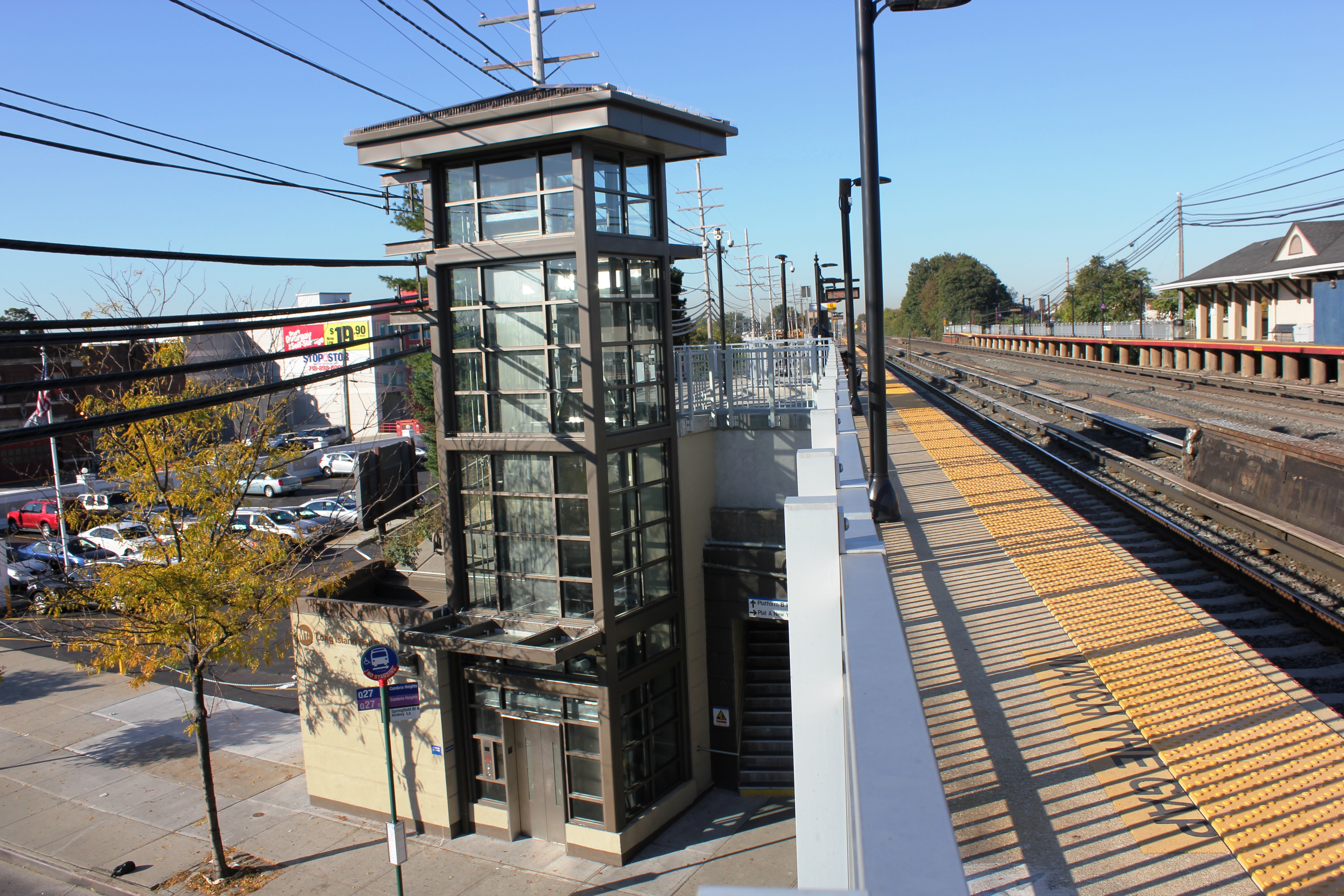
One of the renovated platforms and new elevators installed, as seen following the renovations from the bridge over Springfield Blvd.

== Station layout ==
The station has two high-level side platforms, both of which are eight cars long and are served by a passenger elevator and stairs. Platform A has the station's only station house, a two-story building. The two middle tracks, not next to either platform, are used by the Port Jefferson, Ronkonkoma, Oyster Bay, and Montauk branch trains.

A non-powered storage track is south of the south platform. The Queens Village Freight Yard is located just west of the station, and consists of three tracks. It is used by the LIRR for maintenance and storage, and was sporadically utilized by LIRR freight customers, as well, before the New York and Atlantic Railway assumed freight service operations.

== Services ==
Queens Village station is primarily served by Hempstead Branch trains. On weekends, Port Jefferson Branch trains also serve the station hourly.
