= Mall 211 =

Traffic medians in Queens, New York

Coordinates: 40.7125°N 73.746°W

Mall 211 is a series of nine traffic medians on 211th Street, between 99th Avenue and Hollis Avenue in the Bellaire section of the Queens Village neighborhood of Queens. When the Bellaire section was developed in 1907, a wide road connecting to the Bellaire station on the Long Island Rail Road was given a green median with nine traffic islands serving as a centerpiece of the planned suburban community. Bellaire Boulevard connected two historic roads that predate the neighborhood’s development, Jamaica Avenue and Hollis Avenue.

Prior to its development as a residential community, the nearly 40 acres around Mall 211 were part of Interstate Park, a shooting range and casino operated by the National Trapshooting Association. At its annual Grand American tournament, flying birds were released from their cages and shot by trained marksmen. The park held its first tournament in 1900 but declared bankruptcy two years later after the state passed a law prohibiting pigeon-shooting competitions. Interstate Park was sold for residential development in 1906. At the request of developer Parvin Harbaugh, the Interstate Park station was renamed Bellaire and the neighborhood also adopted this name. Bellaire Boulevard was later designated as 211th Street in compliance with the grid laid out across all of Queens.

Although the Bellaire station closed in 1972 as a result of low usage, the Bellaire community remains an attractive neighborhood due to its suburban appearance and the half-hour commute to Midtown Manhattan from the nearby Queens Village station.
