= 343 Madison Avenue =

Future skyscraper in Manhattan, New York

- Interactive map of the 343 Madison Avenue area

General information
- Coordinates: 40°45′15″N 73°58′40″W
- Estimated completion: 2029

Design and construction
- Architect: Kohn Pedersen Fox

343 Madison Avenue is a skyscraper under construction in the Midtown Manhattan neighborhood of New York City. The building was designed by Kohn Pedersen Fox for developer BXP, Inc. The building will replace the former Metropolitan Transportation Authority headquarters across from Grand Central Terminal. As of April 2026, excavation at the site was under way. An entrance to the Grand Central Madison station, on part of the building's site, opened in May 2026.

Norges Bank Investment Management was an investor in the project, though they later exited the arrangement, returning their investment to BXP for $43.5 million. BXP secured $1.2 billion in financing for the building from Wells Fargo, Bank of America, BNY, and JPMorgan Chase in July 2026.

Starr, an insurance company, signed a lease for 275,000 square feet in the building, serving as its anchor tenant, in October 2025. McDermott Will & Schulte, a Chicago-based law firm, signed a lease in the building for 150,000 square feet in 2026.

== See also ==
- List of tallest buildings in New York City
