= Floral Park station =

Long Island Rail Road station in Nassau County, New York

Floral Park
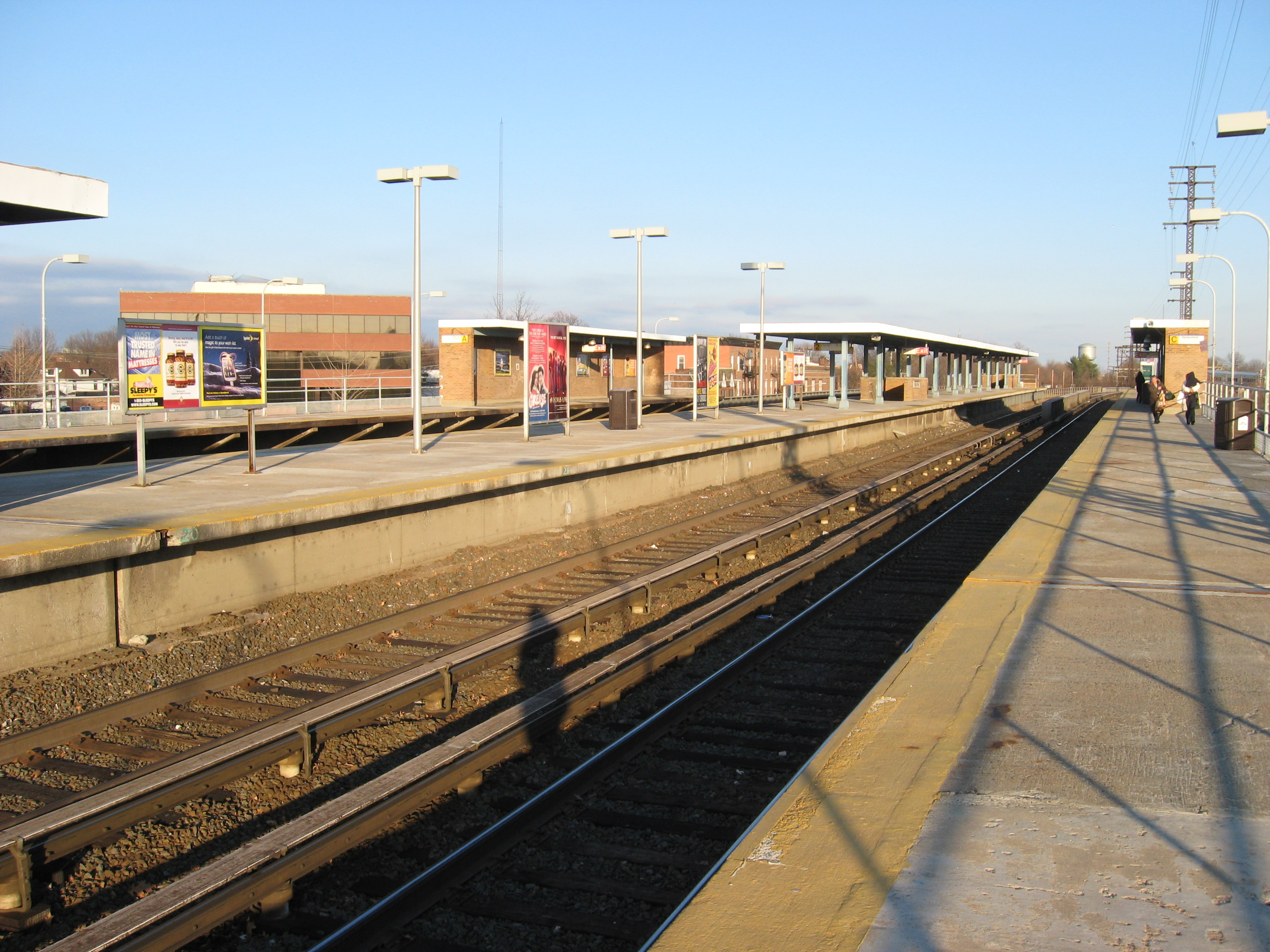
- Looking east at Floral Park, from Platform C, prior to the construction of the Main Line's third track

General information
- Location: Tulip Avenue & Atlantic Avenue; Floral Park, NY
- Coordinates: 40.724622°N 73.706398°W
- Owner: Long Island Rail Road
- Lines: Main Line; Hempstead Branch
- Distance: 14.9 mi (24.0 km) from Long Island City
- Platforms: 2 side platforms 1 island platform
- Tracks: 4 (2 on the Hempstead Branch, and 3 on the Main Line, 1 track shared by both the Hempstead Branch and Main Line)
- Connections: New York City Bus: Q36; MTA Bus: Q110 (at Jericho Turnpike, Little Neck Parkway, 256th and 257th Streets); Nassau Inter-County Express: n24 (at Jericho Turnpike)

Construction
- Parking: Yes
- Cycle facilities: Yes
- Accessible: Yes; 3 Elevators, 1 for each platform

Other information
- Station code: FPK
- Fare zone: 4

History
- Opened: 1878
- Rebuilt: 1909, 1960
- Electrified: May 26, 1908; 750 V (DC) third rail
- Former names: Stewart Junction (1878–1879); Hinsdale (1879–1887); East Hinsdale (1887–1890)

Passengers
- 2012—2014: 2,922 per weekday

Services
Preceding station	Long Island Rail Road	Following station
Bellerose toward Penn Station, Grand Central or Atlantic Terminal	Hempstead Branch	Stewart Manor toward Hempstead
Elmont–UBS Arena toward Penn Station, Grand Central or Long Island City	Port Jefferson Branch	New Hyde Park toward Huntington or Port Jefferson
Oyster Bay Branch does not stop here
Ronkonkoma Branch does not stop here
Montauk Branch does not stop here
Former services
Preceding station	Long Island Rail Road	Following station
Bellerose toward Long Island City or Penn Station	Main Line	New Hyde Park toward Greenport
Terminus	Hempstead Branch	Stewart Manor toward Hempstead
Location

Floral Park is a Long Island Rail Road train station in the Village of Floral Park, in Nassau County, New York, United States. It is located at Tulip and Atlantic Avenues, on the Main Line and Hempstead Branch, just west of their split. Most service at the station is provided by trains on the Hempstead Branch and the Port Jefferson Branch.

== History ==
The first Floral Park station was built between October and November 1878 as "Stewart Junction," for the junction between the LIRR Main Line and the Central Railroad of Long Island built by Alexander Turney Stewart. Five years earlier the CRRLI had bridged the LIRR, and the station served as a connection between both lines. Connecting tracks were available at the southwest corner of the bridge at the station, and on the northwest corner of the bridge west of the station. It was renamed "Hinsdale" in 1879 with the closing of the CRRLI depot of the same name along the Creedmoor Branch, then renamed "East Hinsdale" in 1887. That same year, the station gained a control tower known as "Tower #47." Apparently due to the presence of the florist John Lewis Childs, the station was renamed "Floral Park" by 1890. Tower #47 was replaced with the "FK Tower" in 1904, the station itself was razed in 1909, and a second station was rebuilt and relocated the same year in July. In 1924, the LIRR replaced the FK Tower with the Park Tower, and rebuilt it again in 1946.

The third and current elevated structure was built in 1960 as part of a grade-separation project executed by the New York Public Service Commission, as the second one was razed on October 20 of that same year.

The ticket office at this station was staffed until August 19, 2009, when it was closed during cost-cutting measures across the Metropolitan Transportation Authority.

As part of the LIRR third track project, the Floral Park station was renovated starting in spring 2019 and three vehicular crossings east of the station were rebuilt starting that year. The station was rebuilt and received elevators, making it ADA-accessible as of July 2021. On August 15, 2022, the track designations at Floral Park were changed.

With the opening of Grand Central Madison in 2023, significant service changes occurred at Floral Park. Generally, Hempstead Branch trains provide a one seat ride to Grand Central while Main Line trains provide a one seat ride to Penn Station; previously, almost all Main Line trains bypassed the station. Direct service to Atlantic Terminal is limited to one peak Hempstead Branch train in each direction.

In August 2026, the MTA awarded a contract for significant renovations to Floral Park station as part of its third package of LIRR accessibility improvements. The project will replace and extend Platforms A and B to accommodate 10- and 12-car trains, respectively, construct a new waiting room on Platform B, install snow-melting systems, replace the existing escalator, and repair the station building and viaduct. The renovations will take place alongside a similar rehabilitation project at the nearby Bellerose station.

== Station layout ==
This station has three high-level platforms serving four tracks. Platform A is eight cars long, while Platforms B and C are 10 cars long. Main Line trains (the Port Jefferson, Oyster Bay, Ronkonkoma, and Montauk Branches) use the three northern tracks while Hempstead Branch trains use the two southern tracks.

== See also ==
- History of the Long Island Rail Road
- Long Island Rail Road stations
- Bellerose station
- Creedmoor Branch
