= Hempstead Branch =

Long Island Rail Road branch

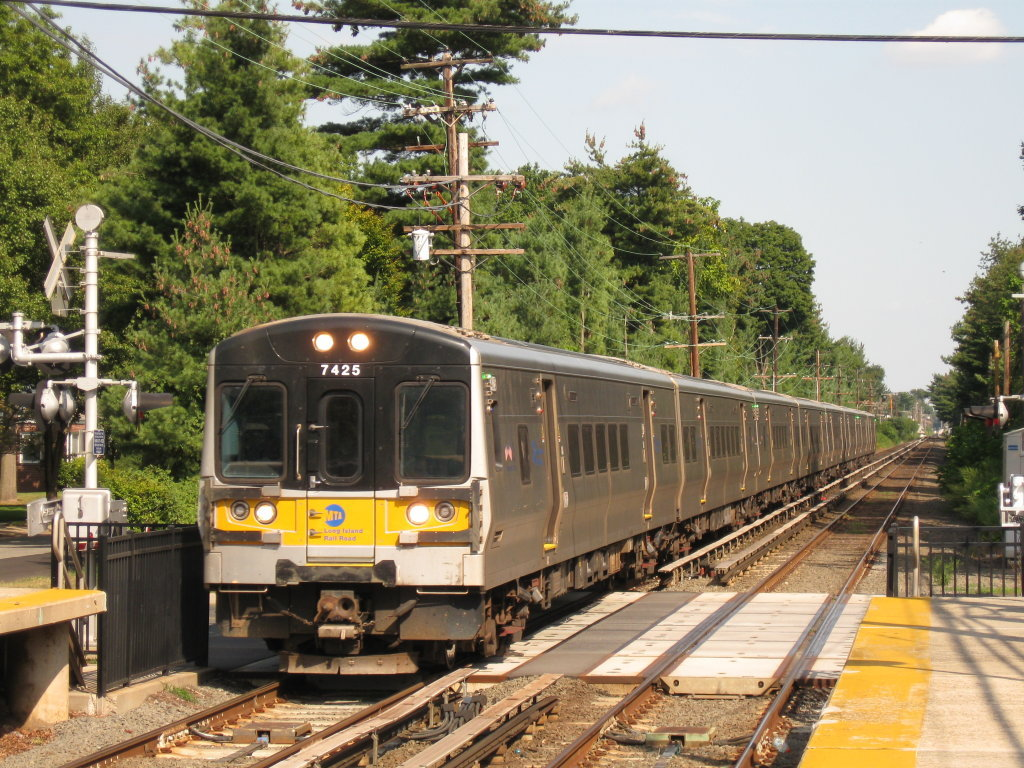
- Hempstead Branch train #757 enters Stewart Manor, due west to Brooklyn.

Overview
- Status: Operational
- Owner: Long Island Rail Road
- Locale: Queens and Nassau County, New York, USA
- Termini: Hillside Facility; Hempstead
- Stations: 10

Service
- Type: Commuter rail
- System: Long Island Rail Road
- Services: Hempstead Branch
- Operator: Metropolitan Transportation Authority
- Ridership: 4,078,296 (annual ridership, 2025)

History
- Opened: 1873 (as part of the Central Railroad of Long Island)

Technical
- Track gauge: 4 ft 8 1/2 in (1,435 mm) standard gauge
- Electrification: Third rail, 750 V DC
Route map
- Distances shown from Long Island City

The Hempstead Branch is an electrified rail line and service owned and operated by the Long Island Rail Road in the U.S. state of New York. The branch begins at the Main Line at Queens Interlocking, just east of Elmont–UBS Arena station. It parallels the Main Line past Bellerose to Floral Park, where it splits southward and continues east via the village of Garden City to Hempstead Crossing. There it turns south to the final two stations, Country Life Press and Hempstead.

LIRR maps and schedules show Hempstead Branch service continuing west along the Main Line to Jamaica. Hempstead Branch trains provide most service at Hollis and Queens Village. The line is double tracked to just east of Garden City Station, where it is reduced to one track at Garden Interlocking for the final 1.4 miles (2.3 km) to Hempstead station.

== History ==
The original Hempstead Branch of the LIRR ran south from Mineola, ending just west of the current terminal in Hempstead. It opened on July 4, 1839, as the first branch of the LIRR.

The Central Railroad of Long Island opened from Flushing east to Hempstead Crossing and south to Hempstead on January 8, 1873; the main line east from Hempstead Crossing opened later that year on May 26. CRRLI extended their line east to Bethpage, Farmingdale, and Babylon resulting in the creation of their own Hempstead Branch running parallel to the one owned by the LIRR. The Central Railroad's successor, the Flushing, North Shore and Central Railroad, was leased to the LIRR on May 3, 1876, and in June a connection at Hempstead Crossing was built, allowing trains from Mineola to use the ex-Central's Hempstead Branch; the original LIRR Hempstead Branch was abandoned south of Hempstead Crossing.

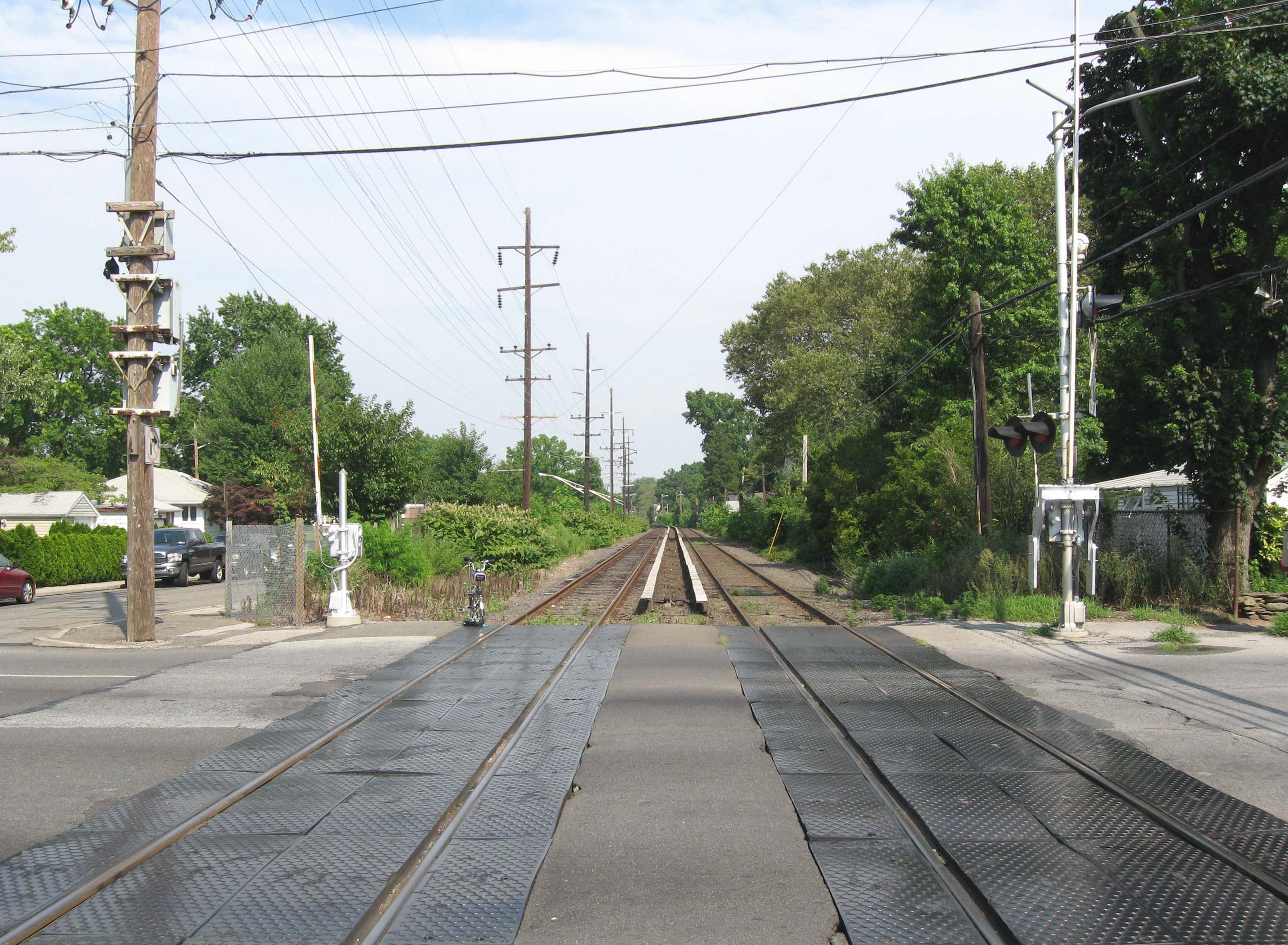
Covert Avenue grade crossing

The old Central main line through Hempstead was named the Central Branch by the LIRR, while the line from Mineola on the LIRR's Main Line south past Hempstead Crossing to Hempstead was the Hempstead Branch. The New York Bay Extension Railroad opened the current West Hempstead Branch in 1893, resulting in a realignment of the Hempstead Branch from Hempstead Crossing south to Meadow Street to better connect to the new line.

Electric service on the current route of the Hempstead Branch, from Queens Village east along the Main Line and Central Branch and south along the Hempstead Branch to Hempstead, was inaugurated on May 26, 1908. In 1910, the branch's connection to the Main Line was double-tracked. The then-Hempstead Branch north to Mineola was electrified on October 20, 1926, along with the West Hempstead Branch.

The line north of Hempstead Crossing last saw passenger service on September 14, 1935, and was abandoned for freight in 1965. Park Interlocking at Floral Park was eliminated in the circa-1960 grade crossing elimination; Hempstead Branch trains switch off the Main Line at Queens Interlocking, just east of Elmont–UBS Arena station, and continue next to it to Floral Park.

Since the opening of the East River Tunnels in 1910 and until 2023, westbound service on the Hempstead Branch and its predecessors primarily terminated at Penn Station in Manhattan or Atlantic Terminal in Brooklyn. Following the opening of Grand Central Madison, the primary terminal and origin of Hempstead Branch trains became Grand Central Madison. Hempstead trains now service both Penn and Grand Central on and off peak. This service change caused a decrease in service to Atlantic Terminal and thus to compensate and to allow for a few peak cross-platform-transfers at Jamaica for Brooklyn-bound customers, some peak trains from Hempstead service Atlantic Terminal directly.

== Projects ==
=== New Elmont-UBS Arena station ===
The MTA built the Elmont-UBS Arena station in Elmont, New York, as part of the Belmont Park redevelopment in the early 2020s. The station includes two new 12-car platforms, and ADA-compliant elevators. The eastbound platform opened first on November 20, 2021. The westbound platform officially opened on October 6, 2022.

== Stations ==
West of Hollis, most trips go on to terminate at Grand Central Madison or Penn Station, with some trips ending at Jamaica.

| Zone | Location | Station | Miles (km) from Long Island City | Date opened | Date closed | Connections and notes |
|---|---|---|---|---|---|---|
| 3 | Jamaica, Queens | Hillside Facility | | July 22, 1991 | | Employees-only station |
| 3 | Hollis, Queens | Hollis | 11.5 (18.5) | 1885 | | New York City Bus: Q2, Q3; MTA Bus: Q110 |
| 3 | Queens Village, Queens | | | | | |
| 3 | Queens Village, Queens | Bellaire | | 1837 | 1972 | Originally named Flushing Avenue, then Brushville, then Interstate Park, then Brushville Road |
| 3 | Queens Village, Queens | Queens Village | 13.2 (21.2) | 1881 | | New York City Bus: Q27, Q36, Q88; MTA Bus: Q110; Nassau Inter-County Express: n24 |
4
| 4 | Elmont | Elmont–UBS Arena | | November 20, 2021 (eastbound); October 6, 2022 (westbound) | | New York City Bus: Q2, Q36, Q82; MTA Bus: Q110; Nassau Inter-County Express: n1, n6, n24 |
| 4 | Floral Park | Bellerose | 14.3 (23.0) | 1898 | | |
| 4 | Floral Park | Floral Park | 14.9 (24.0) | 1878 | | Long Island Rail Road: ■ Port Jefferson Branch (limited service) |
| 4 | Garden City | Stewart Manor | 16.3 (26.2) | 1873 | | Nassau Inter-County Express: n25/58 |
| 4 | Garden City | Nassau Boulevard | 17.3 (27.8) | 1907 | | Adelphi University Shuttle |
| 4 | Garden City | Garden City | 18.4 (29.6) | 1872 | | Nassau Inter-County Express: n40 |
| 4 | Garden City | Country Life Press | 19.0 (30.6) | 1911 | | |
| 4 | Hempstead | Rosa Parks Hempstead Transit Center | 19.8 (31.9) | 1872 | | Nassau Inter-County Express: n6, n6X, n15, n16, n16C, n27, n31, n31x, n32, n35, n40, n41, n48, n49, n54, n55, n70 Mercy Medical Shuttle; Greyhound Bus |
