= Belmont Park station =

Long Island Rail Road station in Queens, New York

Belmont Park
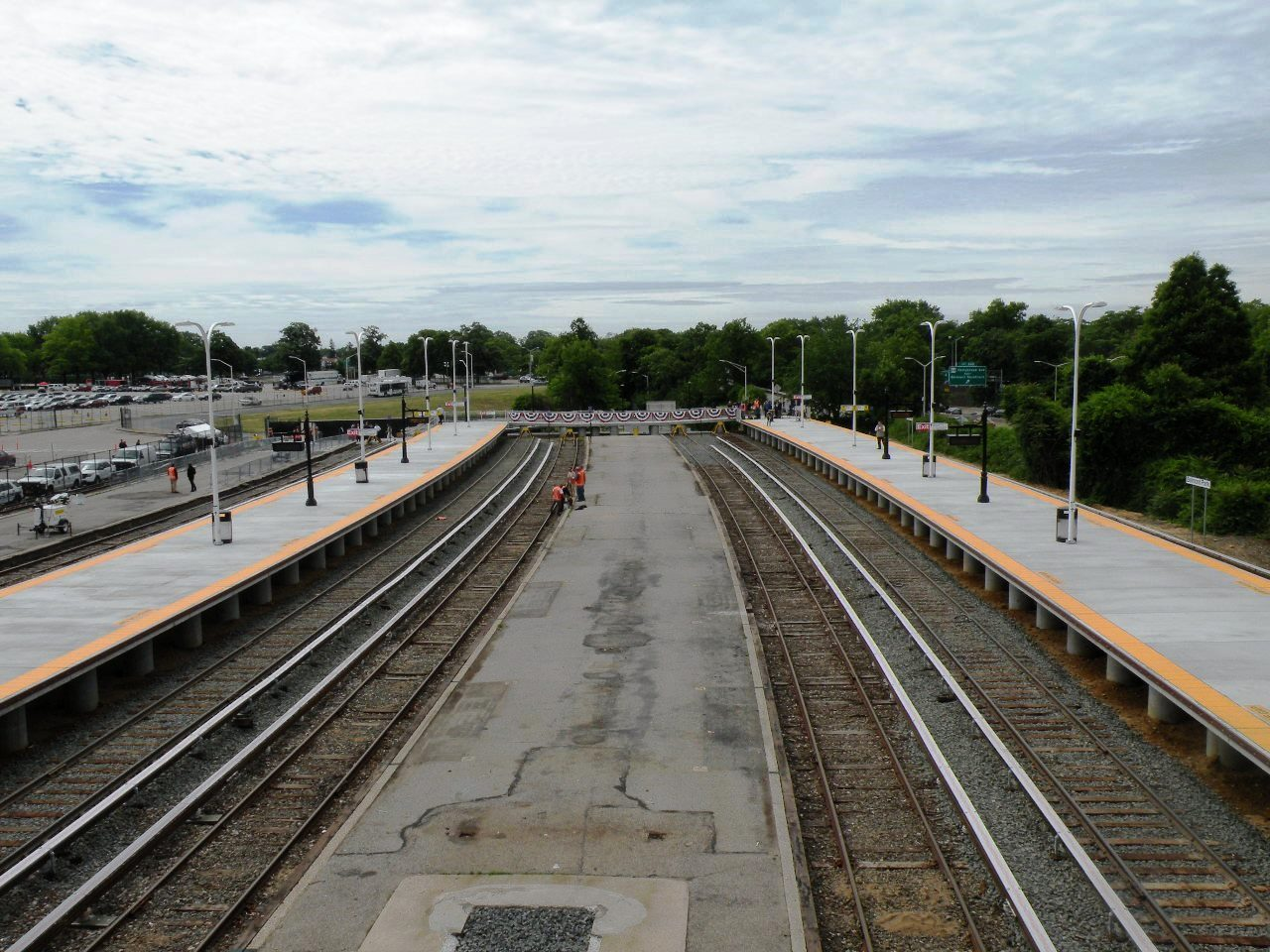
- Belmont Park station after the addition of two high-level platforms

General information
- Location: Belmont Park; Queens, New York
- Coordinates: 40.713655°N 73.728299°W
- Owner: Long Island Rail Road; State of New York
- Line: Belmont Park Branch
- Distance: 0.1 mi (0.16 km) from Queens Village
- Platforms: 2 low-level and 2 high-level island platforms
- Tracks: 8
- Connections: NYCT Bus: Q2, Q82; Nassau Inter-County Express: n1, n6

Construction
- Parking: No
- Accessible: Yes

Other information
- Station code: BRT
- Fare zone: 4

History
- Opened: May 4, 1905
- Rebuilt: 1957, 2015
- Electrified: October 2, 1905

Services
Preceding station	Long Island Rail Road	Following station
Jamaica toward Penn Station or Grand Central	Belmont Park Branch special events	Terminus
Location

Belmont Park is a seasonal-use Long Island Rail Road station on the grounds of the Belmont Park racetrack in the New York City borough of Queens. The station is a terminus of a spur line that lies south of and between the Queens Village and Elmont–UBS Arena stations on the Main Line/Hempstead Branch. Consistent with the names of other lines and branches of the LIRR, the spur line is called the Belmont Park Branch.

== Overview ==
The Belmont Park station is a terminus of a spur line that lies south of and between the Queens Village and Elmont–UBS Arena stations on the Main Line/Hempstead Branch. Consistent with the names of other lines and branches of the LIRR, the spur line is called the Belmont Park Branch.

Train service to the Belmont Park station is operated only for special events such as the Belmont Stakes. Starting in November 2021, the venue has also been served full-time by the Elmont–UBS Arena station, located directly to the north and along the Main Line/Hempstead Branch.

Unlike the rest of the property on Belmont Park, the Belmont Park station is part of a small sliver of Belmont property (including some parking) that is located in Queens. The racing complex is located in Nassau County.

== Service ==
On the day of the Belmont Stakes, a total of 15 trains depart from Pennsylvania Station and six trains depart from Grand Central Madison, providing service to Belmont Park between 9:30 am and 5 pm. Returning trains to Manhattan begin departing Belmont Park at 4 pm and service is increased to departures at a frequency of every 15 minutes immediately following the Belmont Stakes race until the park closes. Trains serving Belmont Park operate express to and from Jamaica, where connections are available to City Terminal Zone trains as well as service to other LIRR stations.

For the 2023 Belmont Stakes, the Long Island Rail Road carried a total of 22,902 riders to and from Belmont Park station, which amounted to approximately 25 percent of the total track attendance. Trains did not stop at the Elmont station between 8 am and 10 pm on Belmont Stakes day.

The New York & Atlantic Railway serves the park twice a week, delivering boxcars loaded with feed for the park's horses, usually BNSF cars. The LIRR also stores its own gondolas, hoppers and flatcars used in work train service at the Belmont Park station.

== History ==
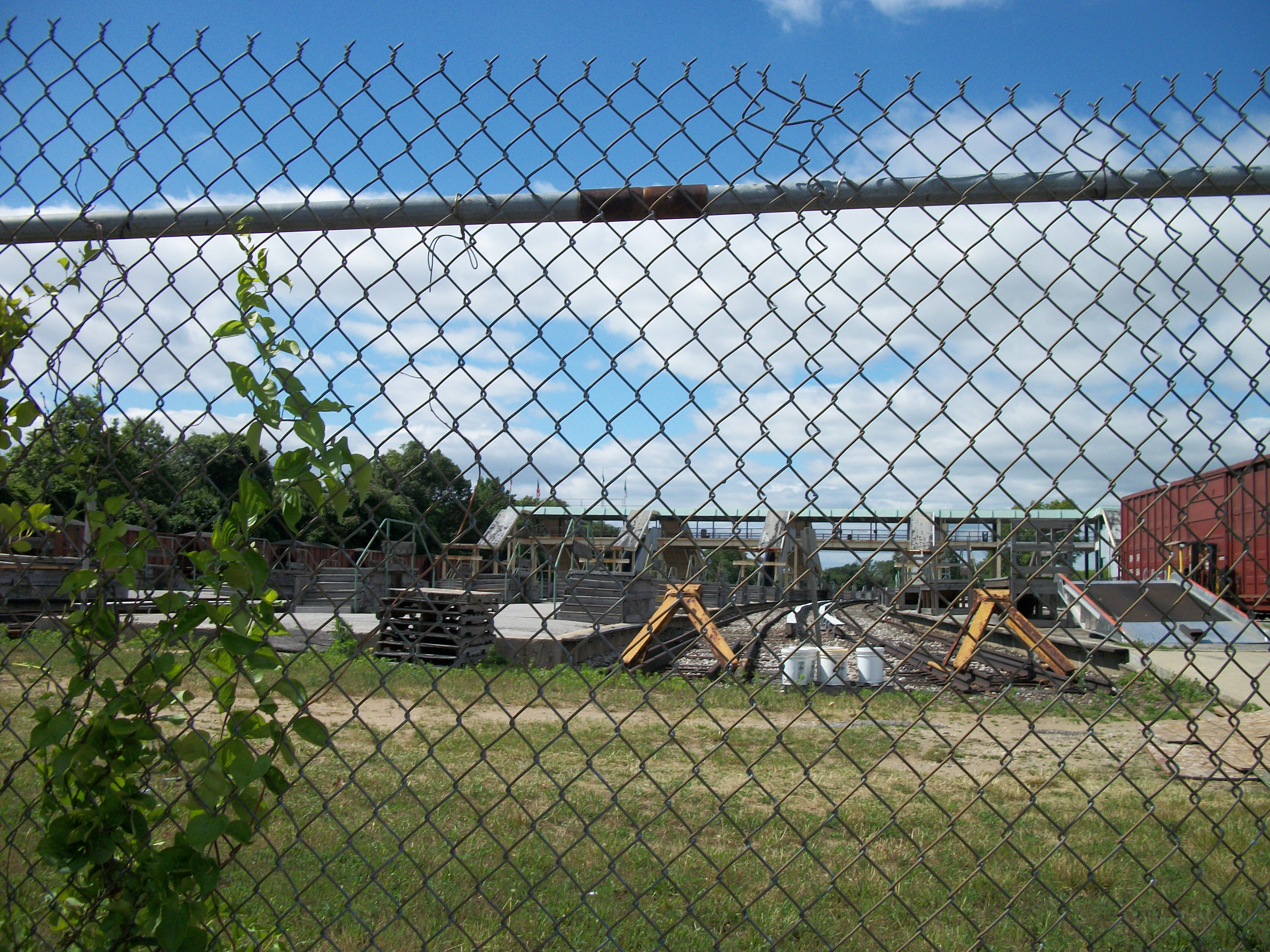
The station, as seen from the Cross Island Parkway–Hempstead Turnpike Interchange in 2010. Note the BNSF boxcar on the easternmost track in the terminal.

When Belmont Park opened on May 4, 1905, about 19,000 passengers—nearly half of all racetrack attendees—took the railroad to the racetrack on opening day. The first electric trains to Belmont Park ran on October 2, 1905, the opening day of the fall meet. The original station was located south of Hempstead Turnpike; the present terminal north of Hempstead Turnpike was opened in 1957.

When the spring 2009 meet began on April 29, 2009, the MTA halted daily service to Belmont Park station due to insufficient funding in the MTA's budget. The New York Racing Association provided shuttle bus service from the Queens Village station to Belmont Park; the n6, Q2 and Q110 also offered alternate service. On May 28, 2009, Belmont Park service resumed per the MTA board's approval as the New York State legislature passed a funding plan for the MTA. This was the only service reduction enacted as part of the MTA's 2009 "doomsday" budget.

However, regular service to Belmont Park was suspended again in 2010 due to MTA budget cuts and trains only operated on June 4 and 5 during the weekend of the Belmont Stakes. On other racing days, the New York Racing Association provided shuttle bus service between the racetrack and the Queens Village station. On April 26, 2011 the NYRA announced that it would subsidize the cost of providing LIRR service to the racetrack for the entire spring/summer meet.

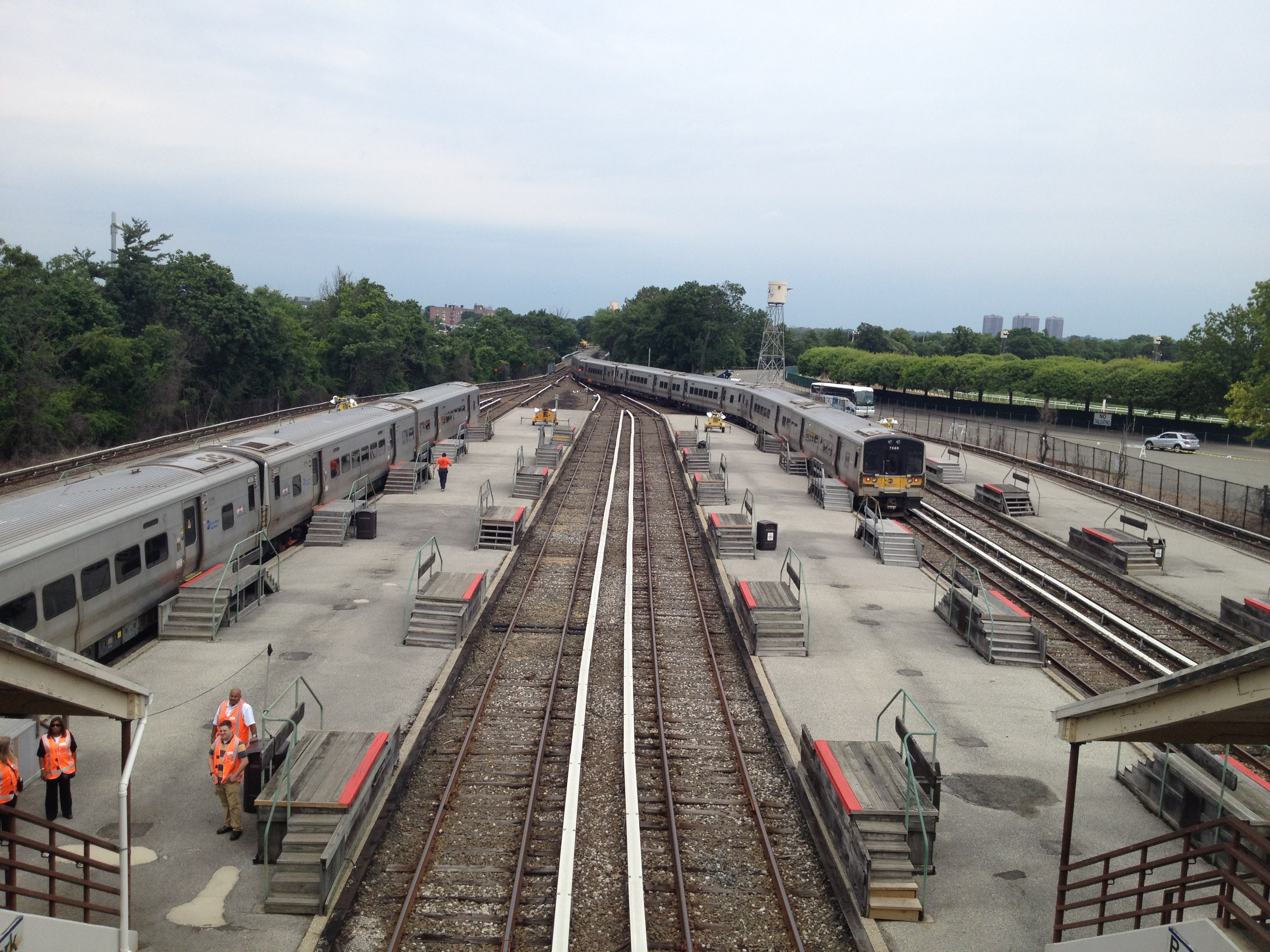
The station prior to its 2010s renovation

In 2014, the Belmont Park line became the subject of controversy when the LIRR found itself struggling to transport the larger-than-expected number of visitors to the Belmont Stakes. Due to this overcrowding the NYRA funded a fast-tracked improvement program to partially upgrade the station in time for the 2015 Belmont Stakes. Two of the four low-level platforms—which were the only ones in the LIRR system since the 1990s, when all other LIRR stations had full-height platforms installed—were replaced with newly built high-level platforms in compliance with the Americans with Disabilities Act of 1990. The other two platforms still have fixed steps attached to them, as all four platforms used to have. The renovated station opened on June 4, 2015, before the Belmont Stakes. As part of the new station changes, the LIRR was also planning to use the eastern wye track from the Hempstead Branch to speed up service leaving the station.

In July 2019, the UBS Arena development plan was adopted by the Empire State Development board. The plan included a new Elmont station on the LIRR Main Line, to the north of Belmont Park station. The eastbound platform at Elmont initially opened on November 16, 2021, while the westbound platform opened on October 6, 2022.

On February 24, 2023, the LIRR eliminated shuttle services for special events at UBS Arena. This coincided with Elmont operating full time as part of the redevelopment of train schedules for East Side Access.

Prior to the full time opening of the Elmont station, on racing days the Long Island Rail Road operated two trains to and from Belmont Park. One train originated and terminated at Pennsylvania Station with a stop at Woodside. The average daily ridership for the station was 100.

== Station layout ==
The station has two ten-car-long high-level island platforms (B and D) level with train doors and two low-level at-grade island platforms (A and C). Platforms A and C can only be used when temporary wooden stairwells are installed, as LIRR coaches do not have steps fixed to them. Tracks 1 and 2 are also not electrified.

== See also ==
- Elmont–UBS Arena station
- Mets–Willets Point station (LIRR)
