= Grand Central Madison =

Long Island Rail Road station in Manhattan, New York

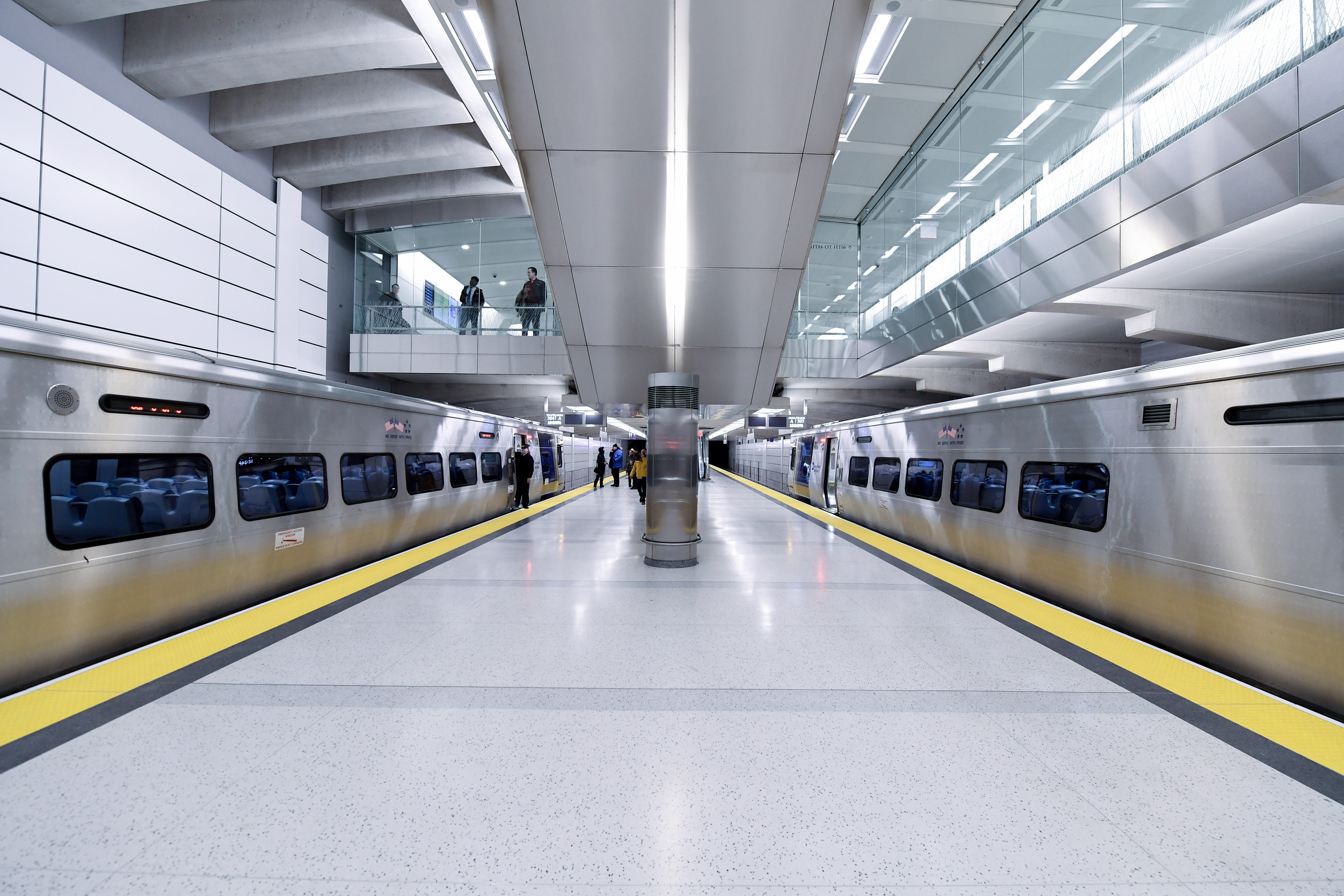
- One of Grand Central Madison's lower-level platforms on opening day in 2023

General information
- Coordinates: 40.7542°N 73.9770°W
- Owner: Metropolitan Transportation Authority
- Operator: MTA Grand Central Madison Concourse Operating Company
- Line: Grand Central Branch
- Platforms: 4 island platforms
- Tracks: 8
- Connections: Metro-North Railroad: Harlem, Hudson, and New Haven lines at Grand Central Terminal; New York City Subway: at Grand Central–42nd Street; NYCT Bus: M1, M2, M3, M4, M42, M101, M102, M103; MTA Bus: Q32; MTA Bus, Academy Bus: express services

Construction
- Structure type: Underground
- Depth: 140 ft (43 m)
- Platform levels: 2
- Accessible: Yes
- Architect: AECOM (structural engineering and architecture design)

Other information
- Station code: GCT
- Fare zone: 1

History
- Opened: January 25, 2023; 3 years ago

Passengers
- 17.1 million annually

Services
Preceding station	Long Island Rail Road	Following station
Terminus	Port Washington Branch	Woodside toward Port Washington
Terminus	Hempstead Branch	Woodside toward Hempstead
Terminus	Port Jefferson Branch	Woodside toward Huntington
Terminus	Ronkonkoma Branch	Woodside toward Ronkonkoma
Terminus	Far Rockaway Branch	Woodside toward Far Rockaway
Terminus	Babylon Branch	Woodside toward Babylon
Terminus	West Hempstead Branch	Woodside toward West Hempstead
Terminus	Long Beach Branch	Woodside toward Long Beach
Terminus	Belmont Park Branch special events	Woodside toward Belmont Park
Location

Grand Central Madison, also known as the Madison Concourse and announced on trains as Grand Central, is a commuter rail terminal for the Long Island Rail Road (LIRR) in the Midtown East neighborhood of Manhattan, in New York City. It sits beneath Grand Central Terminal, which serves the Metro-North Railroad – the other commuter rail system operated by the Metropolitan Transportation Authority (MTA). Built as part of the East Side Access project, the terminal's construction commenced in 2008, and it opened on January 25, 2023.

Grand Central Madison was built to reduce travel times to and from Manhattan's East Side and to ease congestion at Penn Station, the West Side station where all Manhattan-bound LIRR trains had terminated since 1910. The new terminal enables passengers to transfer to Metro-North's Harlem, Hudson, and New Haven Lines, as well as the New York City Subway at Grand Central–42nd Street station.

The station is managed by MTA Grand Central Madison Operating Company (GCMOC), a subsidiary public benefit corporation of the MTA created in October 2021 to manage the assets of the East Side Access project. The company is led by Paul Grether and has five total employees, with most services being handled by centralized functions at the MTA.

== Services ==
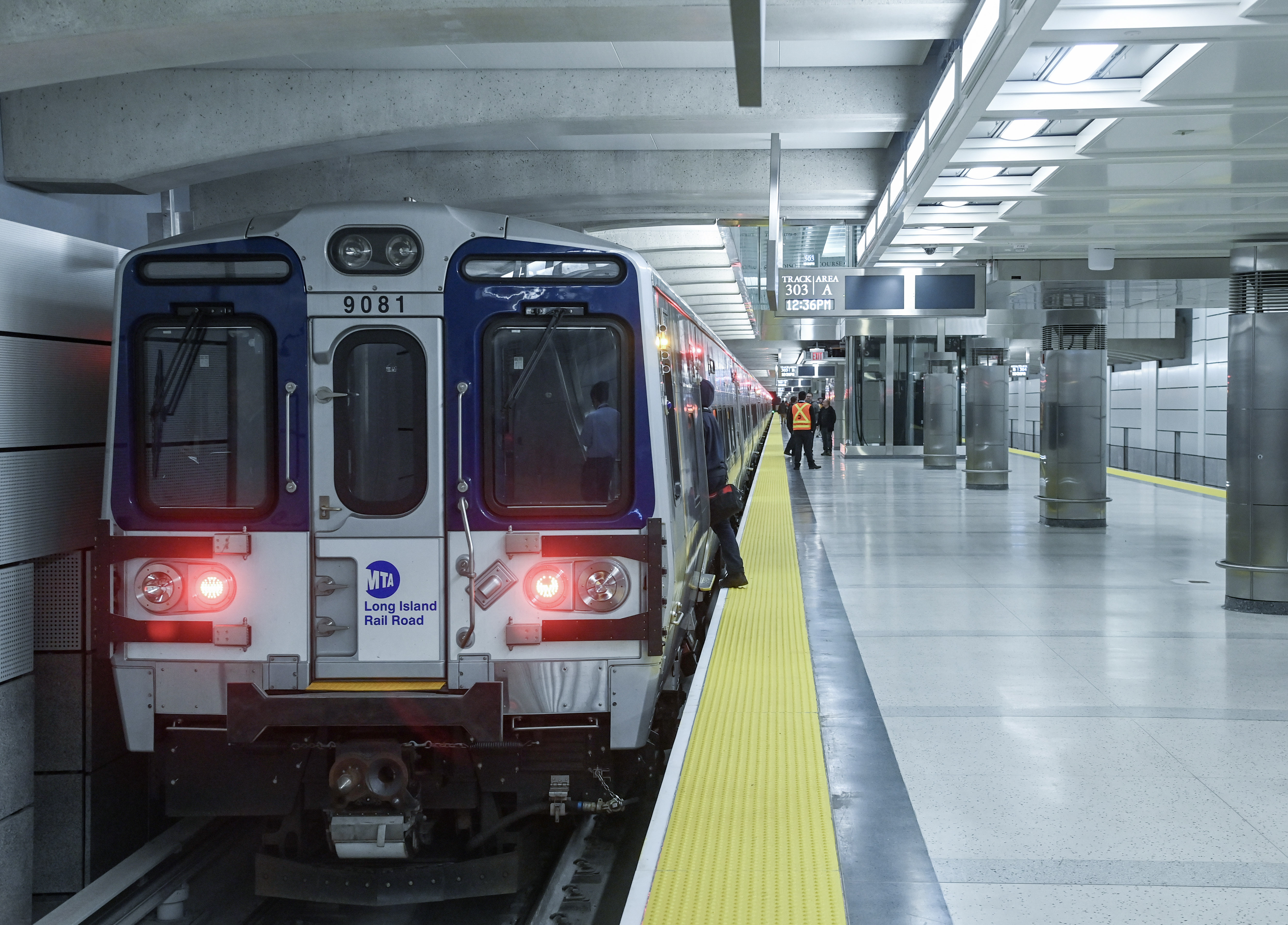
A LIRR train of M9 cars on Track 303

The station serves the Long Island Rail Road's Main Line, which connects to all passenger branches and almost all stations. Service started on January 25, 2023, with a shuttle to Jamaica. Full service at the station began on February 27, 2023, with trains continuing beyond Jamaica to most branches.

Passengers traveling to and from non-electrified portions of the LIRR system – specifically the Oyster Bay Branch, the Port Jefferson Branch east of Huntington, the Main Line east of Ronkonkoma, and the Montauk Branch east of Babylon – must transfer between trains at Jamaica or points east therefrom, as the bilevel C3 coaches used in non-electrified areas cannot fit through the 63rd Street Tunnel.

Grand Central Madison also provides an alternative route from the east side of Manhattan and from Metro-North lines to John F. Kennedy International Airport, via a connection with the AirTrain JFK people mover at Jamaica.

== History ==
=== Planning and construction ===
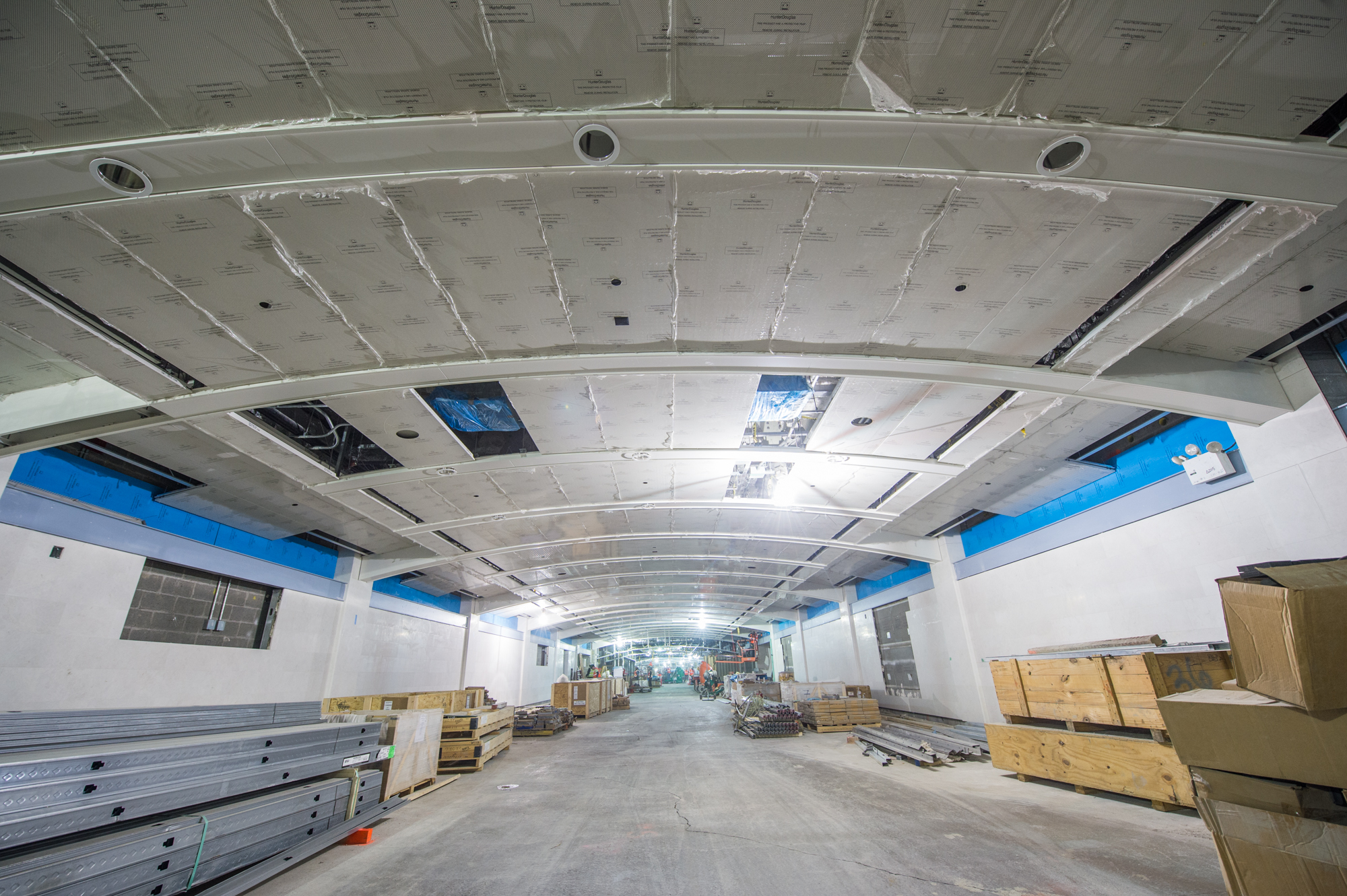
LIRR concourse construction in 2019

Formal proposals to bring Long Island Rail Road trains to the east side of Manhattan date to 1963. In 1968, the 63rd Street Tunnel and a LIRR "Metropolitan Transportation Center" at 48th Street and Third Avenue were proposed as part of the Program for Action. After people living near the proposed transportation center objected, the MTA's board of directors voted to instead route LIRR trains to Grand Central by 1977. However, the LIRR project was postponed indefinitely – along with several others proposed by the agency – during (and as a result of) the 1975 New York City fiscal crisis.

The East Side Access project was restarted after a study in the 1990s showed that more than half of LIRR riders work closer to Grand Central than to Penn Station. The cost of the project, estimated at $4.4 billion in 2004, jumped to $6.4 billion in 2006 and to $11.1 billion by 2017.

In May 2022, the MTA announced that the station would be named Grand Central Madison because it sits under Grand Central Terminal and the "Madison Avenue corridor".

=== Opening and early years ===
The LIRR received operational control of Grand Central Madison on December 9, 2022, upon which the station and tracks became subject to Federal Railroad Administration regulations. A few weeks later, the MTA postponed the station's planned December 2022 opening because of a single ventilation fan that could not exhaust enough air. On January 23, 2023, officials said the station would open and revenue service would begin on January 25. The initial service was provided by the Grand Central Direct – a temporary shuttle service running to and from Jamaica station, with some trains running express and others making intermediate stops at Woodside, Forest Hills, and Kew Gardens. The MTA announced on February 8 that it would begin full service on February 27. The Biltmore Connection to Grand Central Terminal's Biltmore Room opened in May 2023. The MTA upgraded cellular service within the Grand Central Madison station and surrounding tunnels in late 2023.

In early 2024, the MTA board voted to buy a battery-powered locomotive to serve as a "rescue locomotive" that could tow disabled passenger trains through the 63rd Street Tunnel. The line had lacked one because the LIRR's locomotives could only fit through the larger East River Tunnels. In March 2024, Tracks Raw Bar and Grill became the first commercial tenant to sign a lease at Grand Central Madison. The following month, the MTA issued a formal request for proposals for the station's retail space. The station was to have separate dining and retail areas. Parts of the station remained incomplete a year and a half after the station opened. The MTA began looking for a contractor to finish the last portions of the station that August at a cost of up to $50 million. In October, MTA and developer BXP began building a new entrance from the intersection of 45th Street and Madison Avenue, where BXP was erecting 343 Madison Avenue. At the time, the entrance was planned to be completed in 2026. A waiting area also opened at the station in late 2024, near the 47th Street entrance. In December, UNESCO gave its 2024 Prix Versailles Interior Award to Grand Central Madison, calling the station one of the world's most beautiful. At the end of 2024, the storefronts at Grand Central Madison remained vacant, and Tracks Raw Bar and Grill had not yet opened.

The MTA announced in February 2025 that it was no longer looking for a master tenant to take over the retail space at Grand Central Madison, since most of the station's retail space had been leased out. Stores are not scheduled to open until 2026 because of problems with the ventilation system. The Tracks Bar opened in June 2025 as the station's first concessionaire. The MTA added more benches to the mezzanine in August 2025; the benches have seat dividers to prevent people from lying on them. The 343 Madison Avenue entrance opened in May 2026. The final temporary construction walls were removed in October 2026, nearly four years after the station's opening.

== Station layout ==
Grand Central Madison has an area of 700,000 sq ft (65,000 m^{2}), including 120,000 sq ft (11,000 m^{2}) for passengers and 25,000 sq ft (2,300 m^{2}) of retail space. The station also has a total of 47 escalators—more than in the remainder of the LIRR network combined – and 22 elevators.

=== Concourse ===
The retail and dining concourse, called the Madison Concourse, is reached from street level or the Metro-North terminal via stairwells and elevators. It sits at the same depth as the western part of Metro-North's Lower Level, underneath tracks 38 to 42 of Metro-North's Upper Level and Vanderbilt Avenue. The concourse contains a ticket office, ticketed waiting area, nursing room, and customer-service office under 47th Street. It also has restrooms, ticket machines, and retail spaces throughout the concourse. The only seating in the terminal is in the ticketed waiting area, which contains 29 seats; passengers can be fined $50 if they stay in the waiting area for more than 90 minutes. An MTA spokesperson said the rule was an extension of an existing restriction at Grand Central Terminal and that "a customer should not have to wait more than 90 minutes to catch their train, barring a significant service disruption".

The LIRR terminal has entrances from Grand Central Terminal's Dining Concourse and Biltmore Room, and the MTA added new entrances to the LIRR station at 45th, 46th, and 48th streets. In 2021, the 45th Street entrance alone was projected to serve 10,000 passengers per day.

Gallery

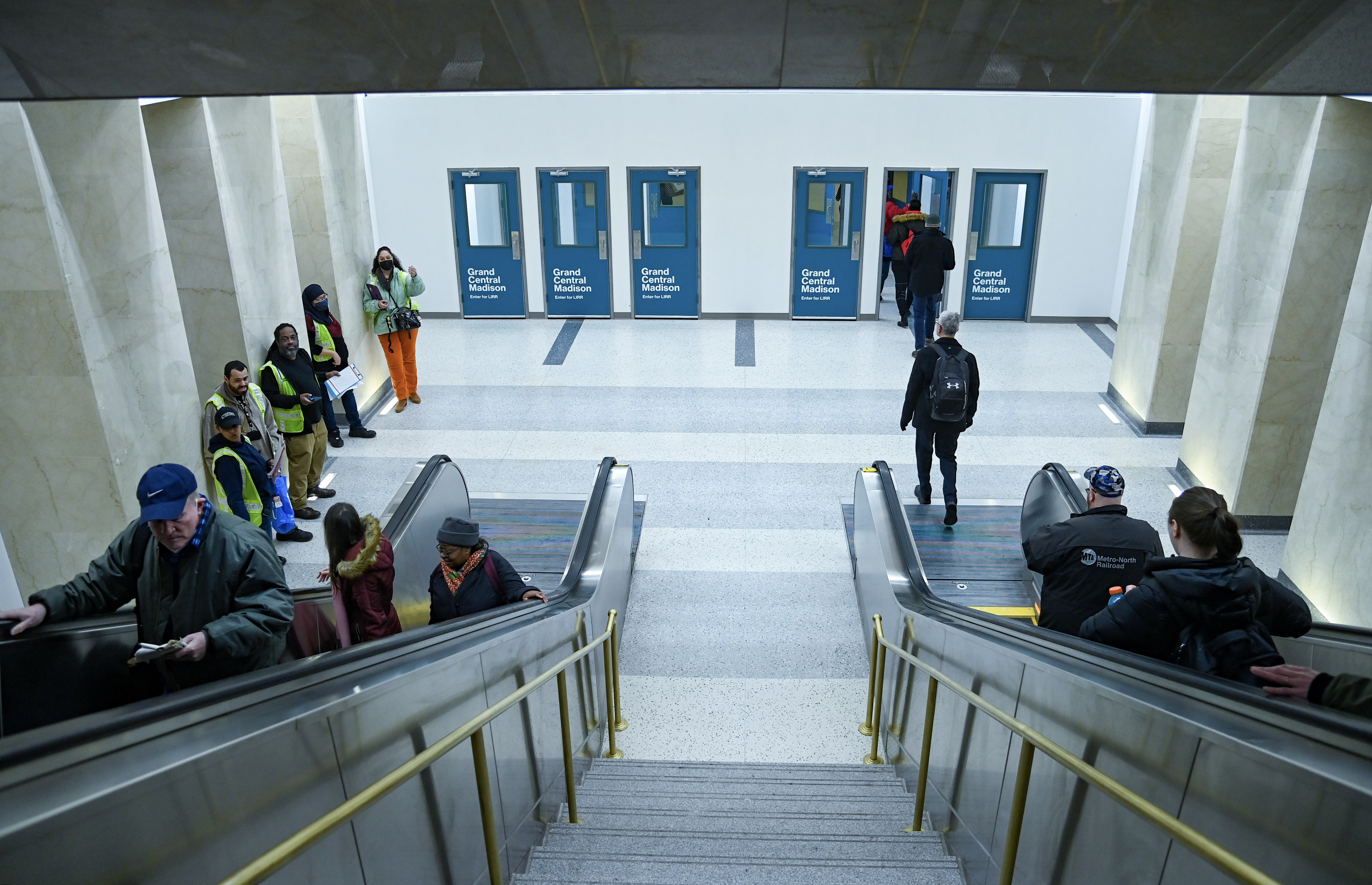
Concourse entrance from the Metro-North terminal

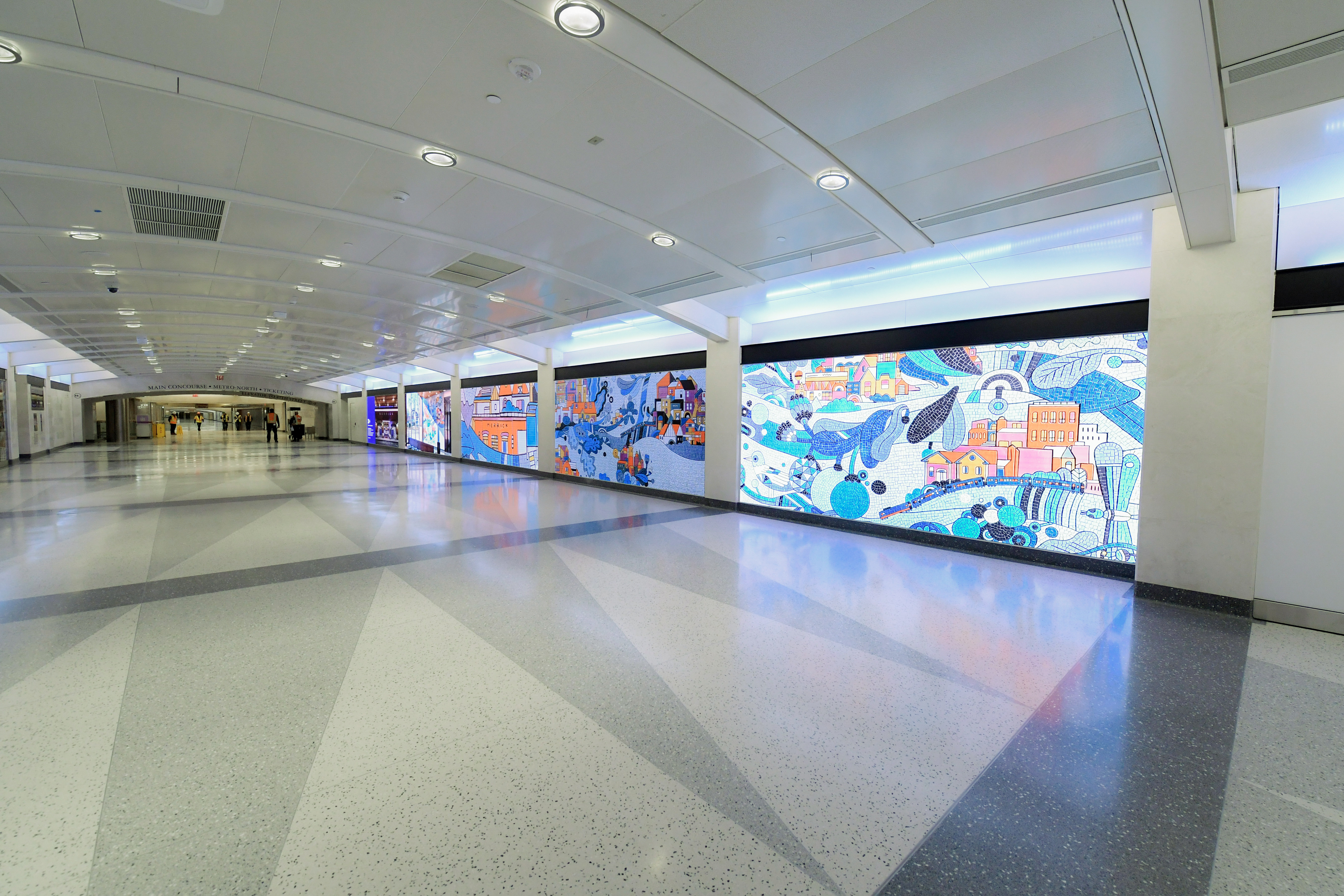
Wide-angle view of the concourse

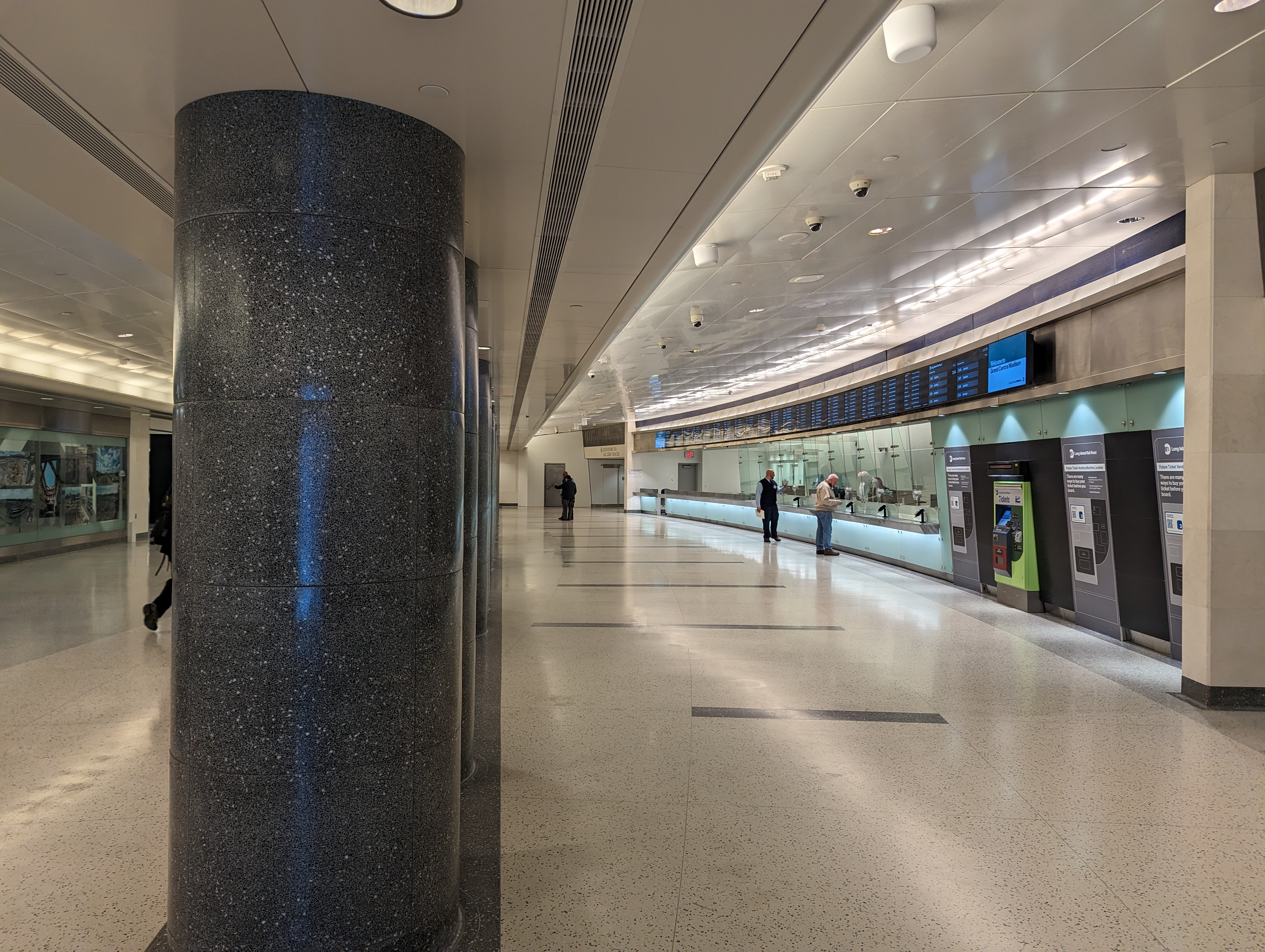
Ticket counter and TVMs

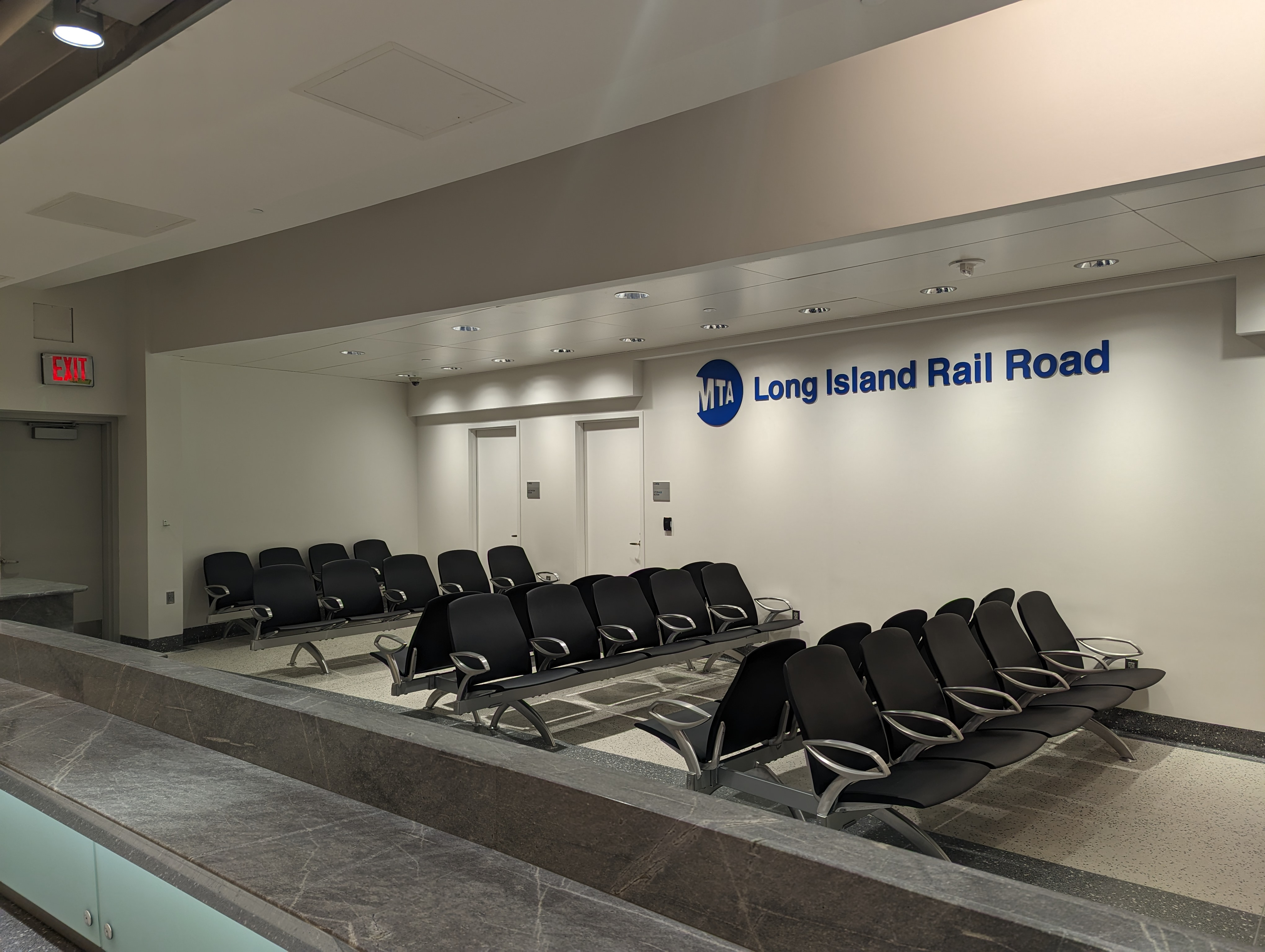
Ticketed waiting area

=== Mezzanine ===
A mezzanine sits on a center level between the LIRR's two track levels. It is more than 140 ft (43 m) deep below Park Avenue, and is connected to the Concourse via four banks of escalators up to 180 ft (55 m) long and descend more than 90 ft (27 m) under 45th, 46th, 47th, and 48th Streets, in which one of its largest has more than five escalators. One of these escalators is also the longest escalator in the city. The escalators and elevators are among the few which are privately operated in the entire MTA system. Additionally, the tiling around the sets of escalators and lights in the mezzanine near each set of escalators exhibits a degree of color coordination, with the set under 45th Street's lighting and tiling in shades of light green, 46th Street's in shades of blue, 47th Street's in shades of purple and 48th Street's in shades of cyan.

Gallery

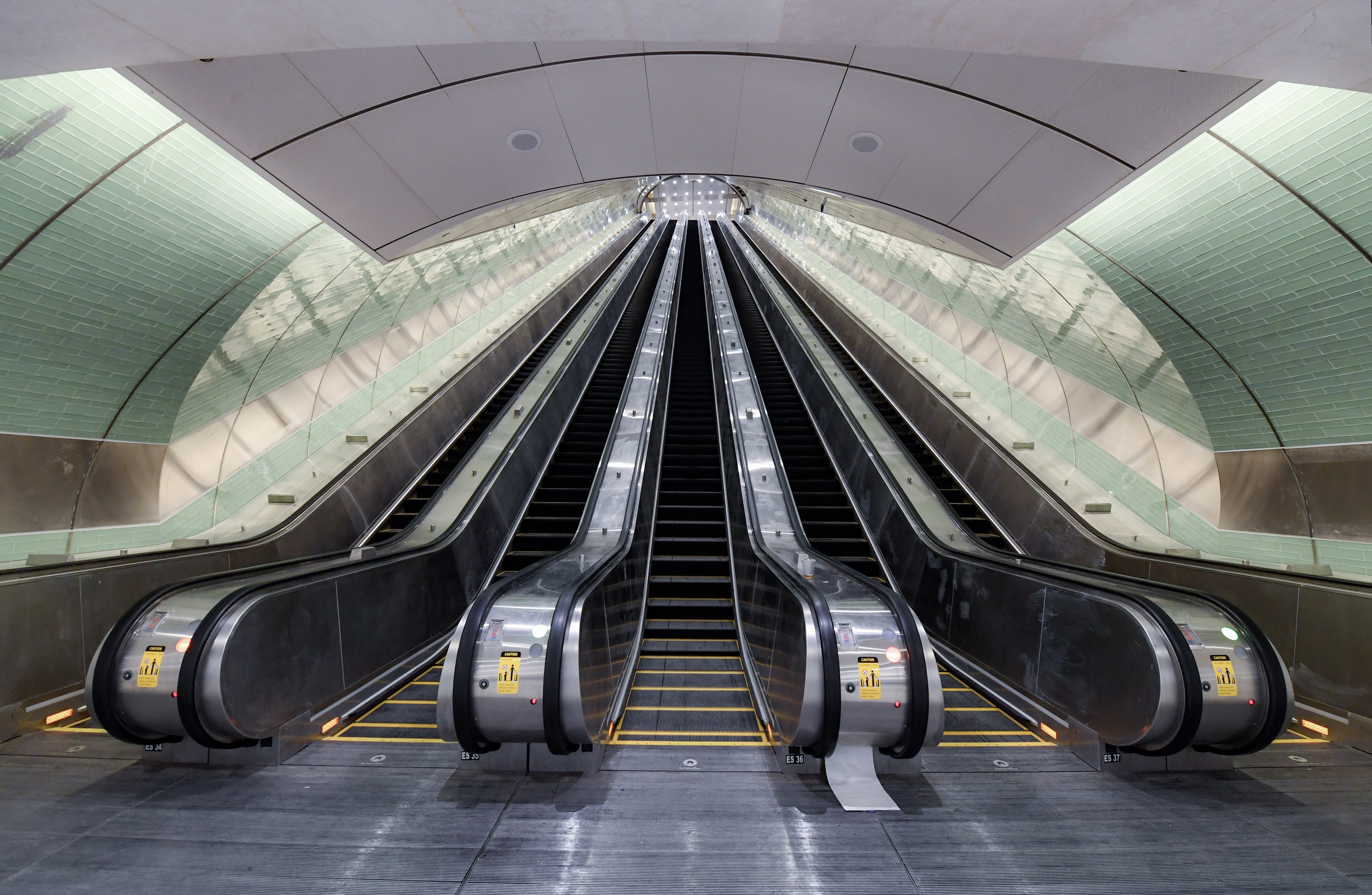
Escalator cavern connecting the concourse and mezzanine

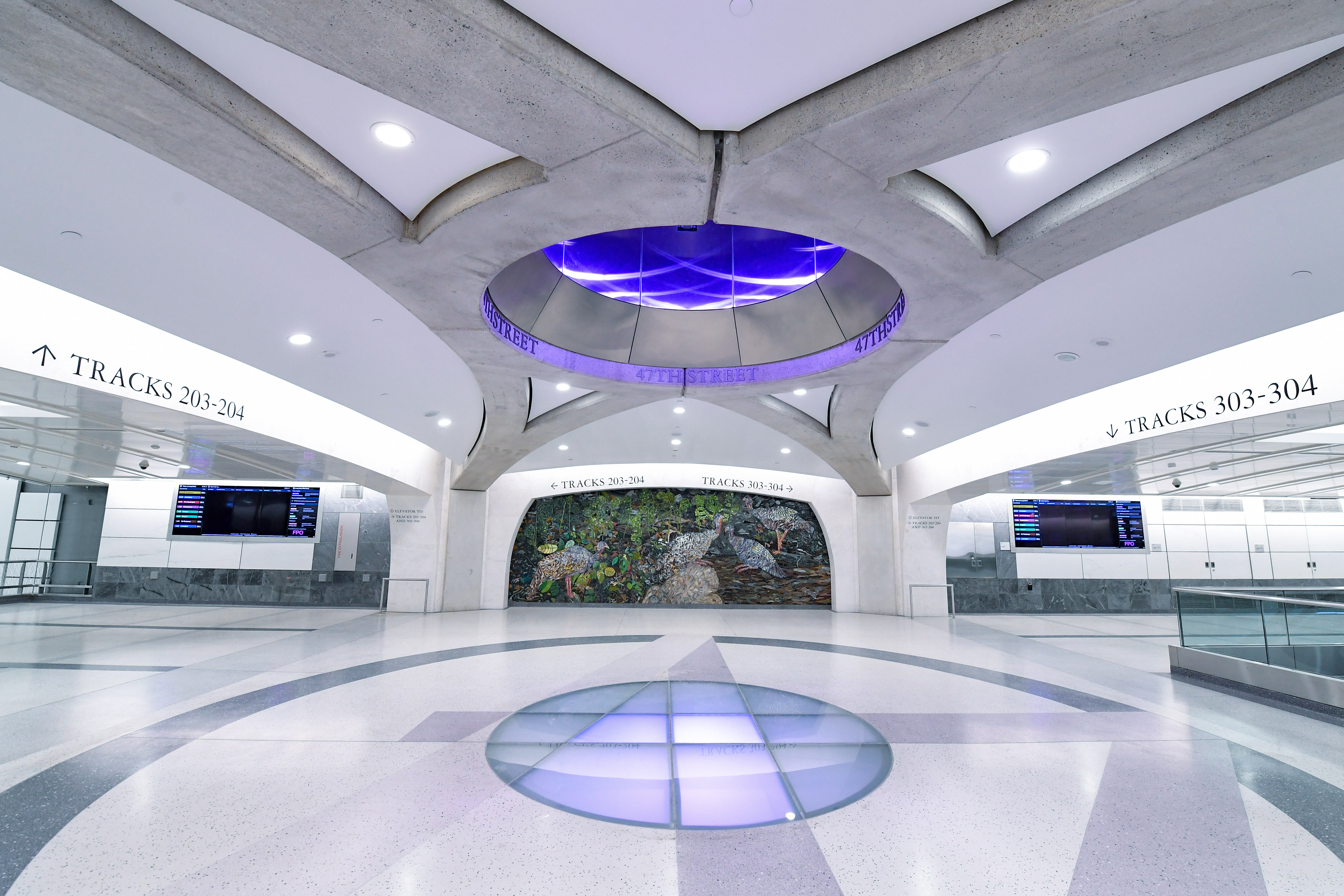
Artwork at the mezzanine level

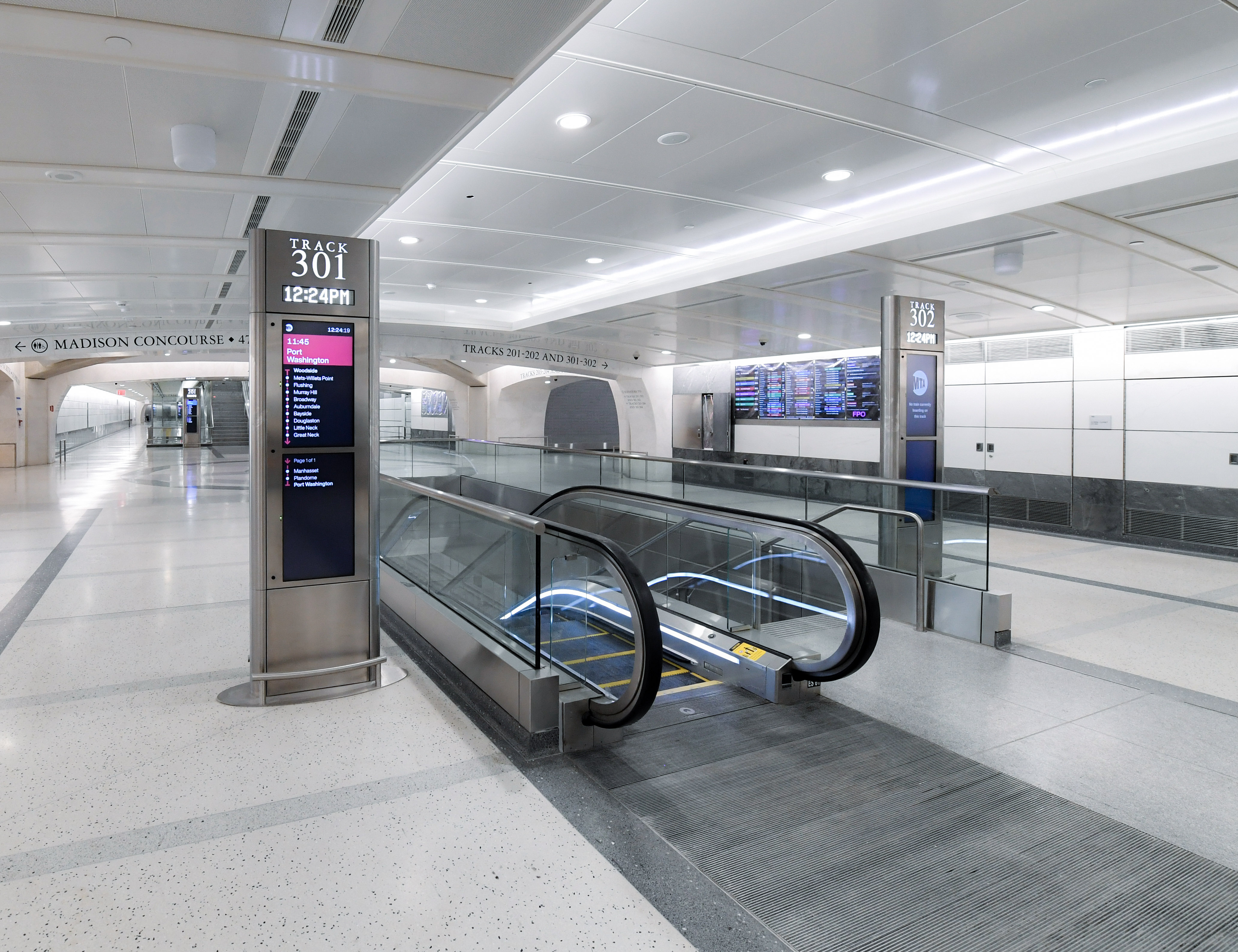
Track entrance from the mezzanine

=== Platforms and tracks ===
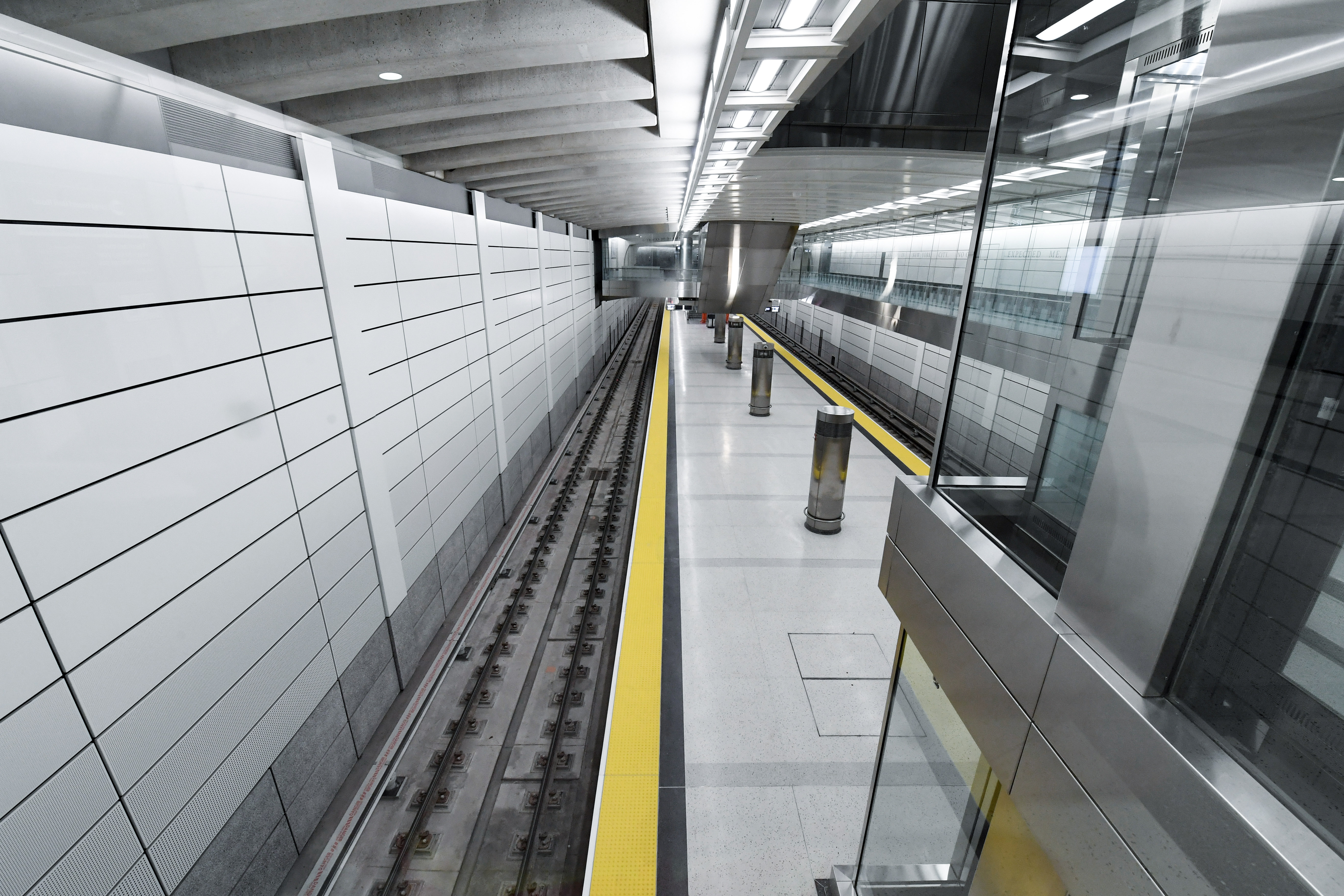
Lower-level platforms viewed from the mezzanine

LIRR trains arrive and depart from the twin station caverns and through a tunnel located 140 ft (43 m) below Park Avenue and more than 90 ft (27 m) below the Metro-North tracks.

The LIRR terminal contains four platforms and eight tracks (numbered 201–204 and 301–304) in two bi-level caverns. There are four tracks and two platforms in each of the two caverns, with each cavern containing two tracks on one island platform per level.

=== Exits ===
The MTA originally planned to build and open entrances at 44th, 45th, 47th, and 48th Streets. The station connects to existing entrances at Grand Central North. The new LIRR station also contains entrances at 335 Madison Avenue, near the southeast corner with 44th Street; at 270 Park Avenue and 280 Park Avenue near 47th and 48th–49th Streets, respectively; and at 347 Madison Avenue, on the east side of the avenue at 45th Street. An entrance on 46th Street between Lexington and Park Avenue was also built, connecting with Grand Central North. However, the MTA later announced its intent to defer construction of an entrance at 48th Street because the owner of 415 Madison Avenue wanted to undertake a major construction project on the site. The MTA also connected the new station to the existing 47th Street cross-passage.

Another entrance with an elevator, a stair, and two staircases was developed at 45th Street. This entrance opened in 2026 and is part of the proposed 343 Madison Avenue development. Two entrances north of 47th Street are being planned as well.

== Art ==
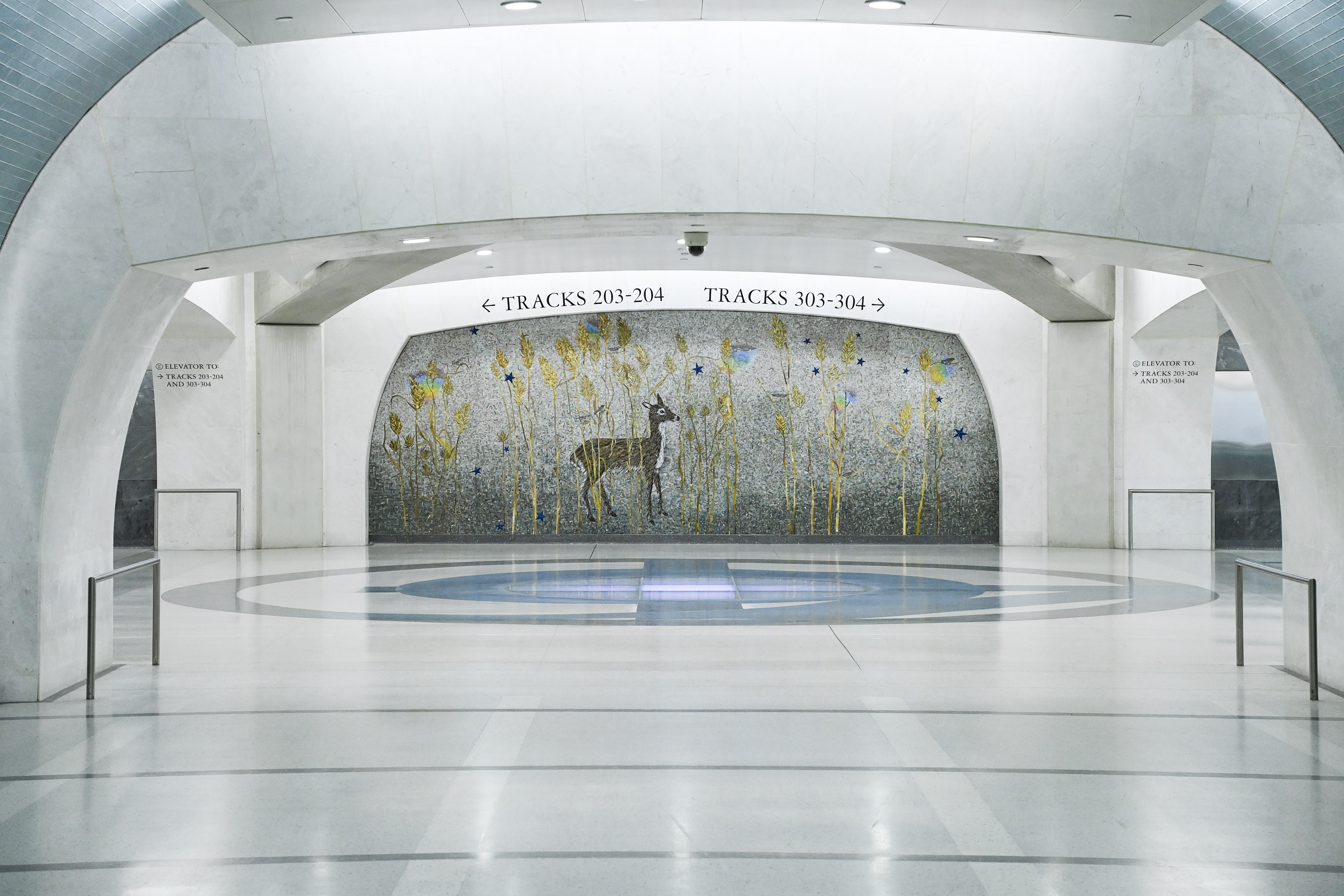
The Presence, a Kiki Smith mosaic

Like the art in the original Grand Central Terminal, the new station includes permanent site-specific works of art. Among them are five large glass mosaics on natural themes by Kiki Smith. The Madison Concourse level contains River Light, an 80 ft-long (24 m) abstract, largely blue-and-white depiction of sunshine on the East River. The other four, one level down in the LIRR mezzanine, are: The Presence, a landscape with a deer; The Sound, a seascape with a gull; The Spring, featuring four turkeys; and The Water's Way, a beach scene. "I wanted places for people to say, 'Meet you by the deer'," Smith told The New York Times.

The Madison Concourse level also holds an even larger 120 ft-long (37 m) mosaic by Yayoi Kusama: A Message of Love, Directly from My Heart unto the Universe.

== See also ==
- Transportation in New York City
- List of Long Island Rail Road stations
