= Main Line (Long Island Rail Road) =

Long Island Rail Road branch

LIRR Main Line
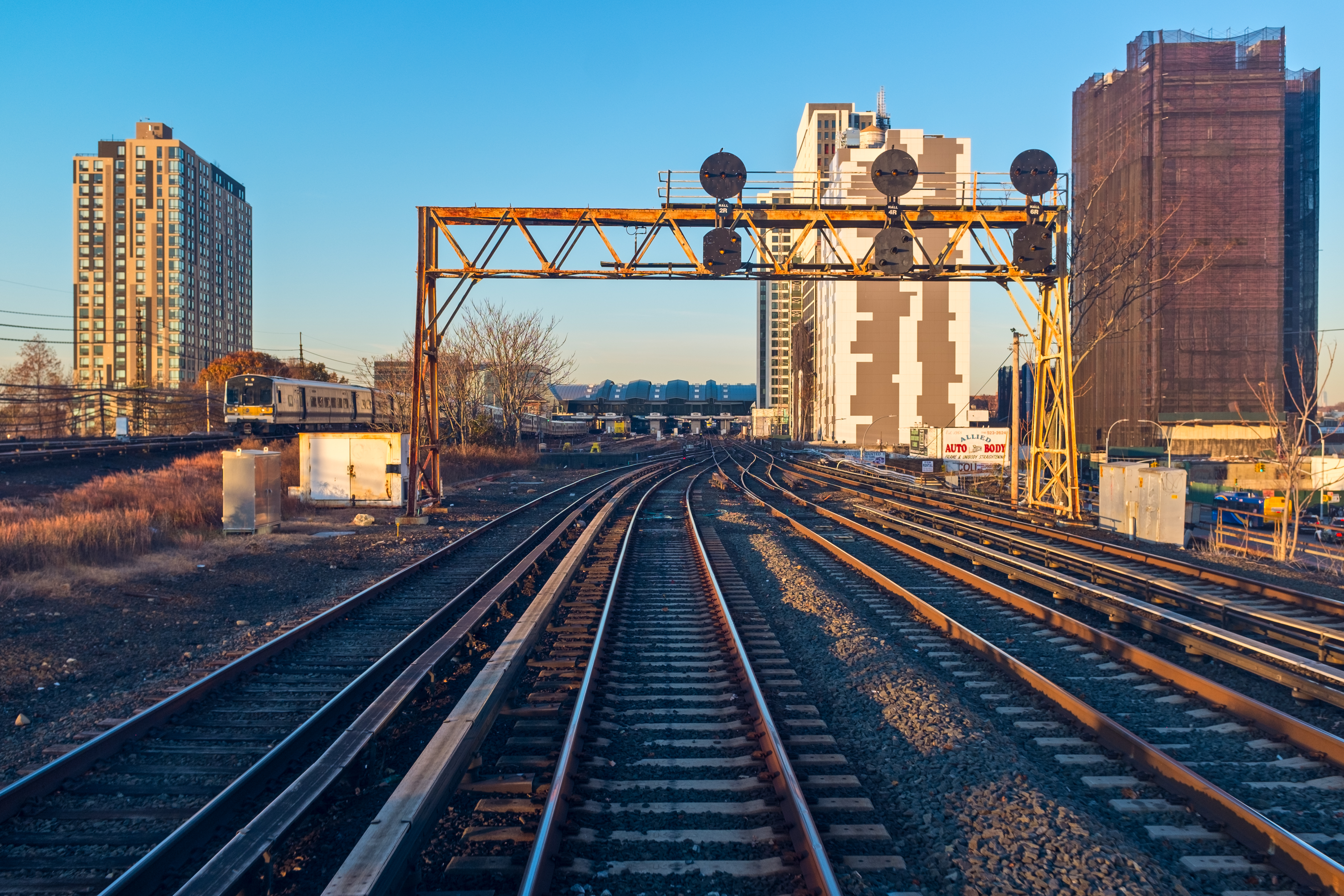
- The Main Line near Jamaica, which is visible in the foreground.

Overview
- Status: Operational
- Owner: Long Island Rail Road
- Locale: Long Island, New York, USA
- Termini: Long Island City; Greenport
- Stations: 30 passenger, 1 employee-only

Service
- Type: Commuter rail
- System: Long Island Rail Road
- Services: City Terminal Zone Belmont Park Branch Hempstead Branch Oyster Bay Branch Port Jefferson Branch Port Washington Branch Ronkonkoma Branch
- Operator: Long Island Rail Road

Technical
- Track gauge: 4 ft 8 1/2 in (1,435 mm)
- Electrification: Third rail, 750 V DC (west of Ronkonkoma)

The Main Line is a rail line owned and operated by the Long Island Rail Road in the U.S. state of New York. It begins as a two-track line at Long Island City station in Long Island City, Queens, and runs along the middle of Long Island about 95 miles (153 km) to Greenport station in Greenport, Suffolk County. At Harold Interlocking approximately one mile east of Long Island City, the tracks from the East River Tunnels and 63rd Street Tunnel into Manhattan intersect with the Main Line, which most trains use rather than using the Long Island City station.

Continuing east, five branches split from the Main Line. In order from west to east, they are:

- Port Washington Branch (at Harold Interlocking in Long Island City, Queens)
- Hempstead Branch (at Queens Interlocking along the Queens/Nassau County border)
- Oyster Bay Branch (at Nassau Interlocking, east of Mineola station)
- Port Jefferson Branch (at Divide Interlocking, east of Hicksville station)
- Central Branch (at Beth Interlocking, east of Bethpage station)—single non-electrified track with no stations, connecting the Main Line to the Montauk Branch

West of Ronkonkoma station, the Main Line is largely double tracked and electrified with 750V DC third rail, with trains governed by Automatic Block and Interlocking Signals and by Automatic Train Control. The line contains a third track between Divide and Park Interlockings and a fourth track between Park and Harold Interlockings. East of Ronkonkoma to Greenport, the line is not electrified and trains operate in non-signaled dark territory, with all train movements being governed by timetable and train order authority. Passenger service east of Hicksville station is covered by Ronkonkoma Branch timetables, as it is the final connecting point to other services.

== Route description and current service ==
The Main Line has one track from just east of Long Island City, where it splits into two tracks just before Borden Avenue, which continue through Hunterspoint Avenue station to Harold Interlocking (Harold, 0.6 miles (0.97 km) northwest of the Woodside station), where the four track Northeast Corridor from Penn Station in Manhattan joins the Main Line after passing through the East River Tunnels. East of Harold, (Note: from 40.75075°N 73.912°W to 40.7382°N 73.894°W) the four-track Main Line runs adjacent to the two-track Port Washington Branch until, 0.7 miles (1.1 km) southeast of the Woodside station, the Port Washington Branch turns northeastward. The Main Line continues southeast with four tracks to Jay Interlocking where it meets the Atlantic Branch and Montauk Branch at the west end of Jamaica station. Eight platform tracks and two bypass tracks pass Jamaica station, along with a few yard tracks and two former freight tracks on the south side that can be used by trains bypassing Jamaica. At Hall Interlocking (Note: 40.70025°N 73.8061°W) just east of the station there are eight through tracks: two usually westward tracks for Main Line and Montauk trains, two Atlantic Branch tracks that are about to duck under and turn southeast, two usually eastward Main Line/Montauk tracks, and the two former freight tracks on the south side of Hall tower.

Just east of there, Montauk Branch trains get their own two tracks in the center of the four Main Line tracks until the Montauk tracks fly over (Note: 40.70585°N 73.7845°W) the other tracks and head southeast. At Queens and Park Interlockings, just inside Nassau County between the Queens Village and Floral Park stations, the four-track Main Line splits into the three-track Main Line and the two-track Hempstead Branch (with one track shared by both lines); the four tracks continue parallel through Floral Park station, after which the Hempstead Branch curves away southward and the three-track Main Line continues east to Mineola. East of Mineola, the Oyster Bay Branch splits from the northernmost Main Line track and curves to the north. The Main Line then continues east from Mineola to Hicksville, where the two track Port Jefferson Branch begins and curves to the north. At Hicksville, the Main Line reverts to two tracks. From Farm Interlocking (just east of Farmingdale station), the Main Line continues to Ronkonkoma, except for some freight sidings along the route.

The Main Line west of Jamaica to Harold Interlocking is the only line that connects to the East River Tunnels and the 63rd Street Tunnel, so it is used by all trains operating to New York Penn Station and Grand Central Madison, both in Manhattan. The portion between Harold and the Long Island City station is used by trains originating or terminating at Hunterspoint Avenue or Long Island City.

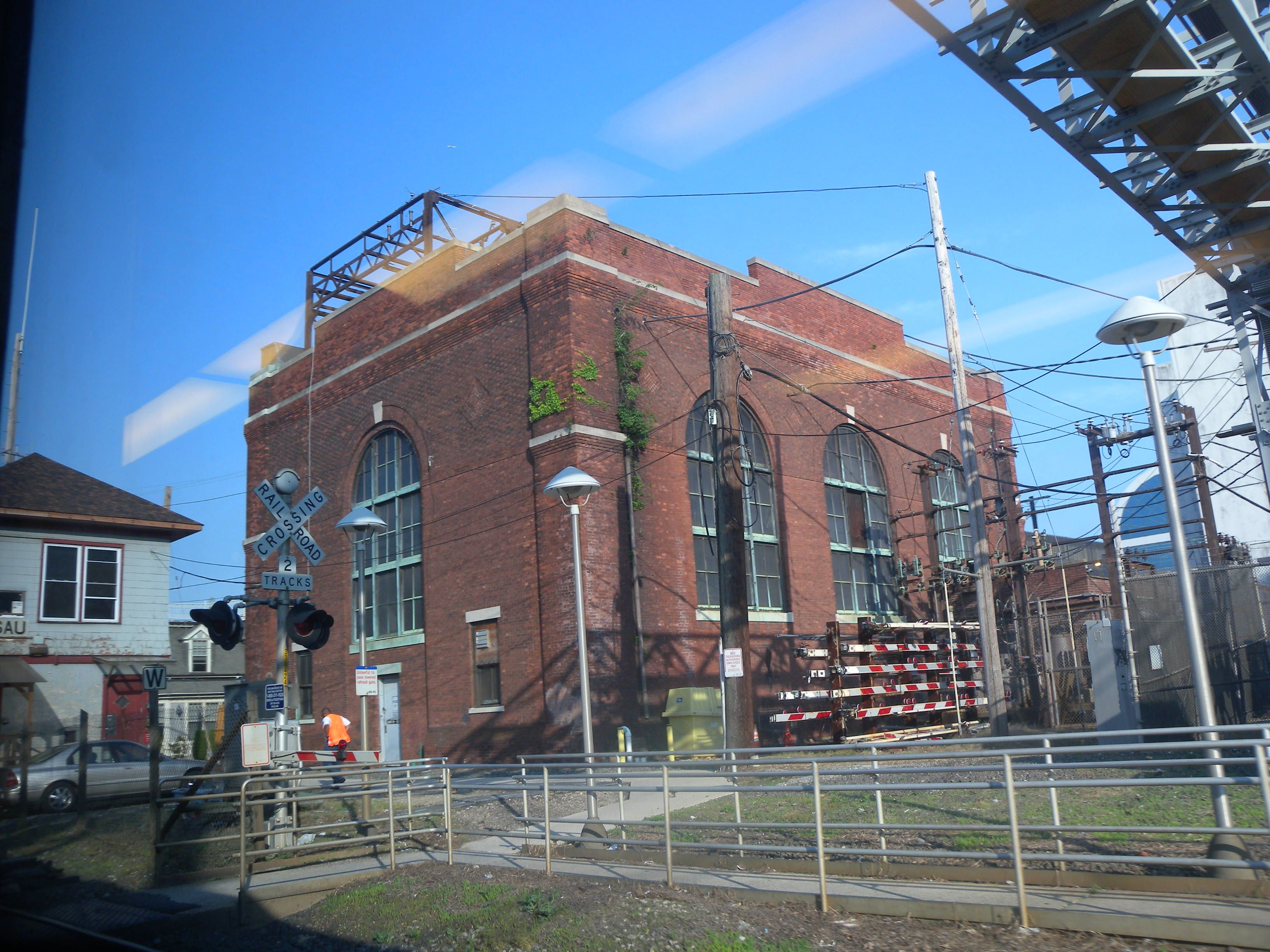
Power station at NASSAU Interlocking in Mineola

East of Jamaica station, the Main Line is used by all trains on the Hempstead Branch (diverging east of Queens Village), the Oyster Bay Branch (diverging east of Mineola), the Port Jefferson Branch (diverging east of Hicksville), and the Ronkonkoma Branch (terminating at Ronkonkoma, the eastern limits of the line's electrification). Some Montauk Branch trains use the Main Line on their way to Babylon via the Central Branch, diverging east of Bethpage.

Only a few diesel shuttle trains, informally known as scoots, operate between Ronkonkoma and Greenport.

== History ==
=== 19th century ===
The Main Line opened beyond Jamaica to Hicksville on March 1, 1837; shortly afterwards, the Panic of 1837 severely curtailed construction. Construction on the line to Greenport resumed in 1840. It was extended to Farmingdale on October 15, 1841, Deer Park on March 14, 1842, Brentwood on June 24, 1842, Central Islip on July 14, 1842 and Yaphank on June 26, 1844. An opening excursion to Greenport was operated on July 27, 1844, and revenue service began over the full line on July 29.

The city of Brooklyn banned the LIRR from using steam propulsion within city limits effective July 1, 1851. The railroad refused to comply until early October, when they stopped freight and passenger trains at Jamaica, directing passengers to take Fulton Street stages to Bedford and transfer there to "Jamaica Line" stages. Laws passed on April 19, 1859 allowed for the appointment of commissioners, empowered to contract with the LIRR to close the Cobble Hill Tunnel, cease using steam within city limits, and instead run horse cars for freight and passengers to the city line or East New York, connecting with steam trains to and beyond Jamaica there. By the fall of 1861, both use of steam as propulsion and of the tunnel had ceased.

In order to maintain access to New York, the LIRR chartered the New York and Jamaica Railroad (NY&J) on September 3, 1859, and a supplement to the LIRR's charter passed March 12, 1860 authorized it to buy the NY&J and build a new main line from Jamaica to Hunters Point. The LIRR carried through with the NY&J purchase on April 25, along with the purchase of a short piece of the Brooklyn and Jamaica at Jamaica. The new line to Hunters Point was officially opened on May 9, 1861, with regular service starting May 10, using a portion of the tracks of the Flushing Railroad between Winfield and Hunters Point.

Floral Park station was built between October and November 1878 as "Stewart Junction," for the junction between the LIRR Main Line and the Central Railroad of Long Island built by Alexander Turney Stewart. Five years earlier the CRRLI had bridged the LIRR, and the station served as a connection between both lines. Connecting tracks were available at the southwest corner of the bridge at the station, and on the northwest corner of the bridge west of the station. It was renamed "Hinsdale" in 1879 with the closing of the CRRLI depot of the same name along the Creedmoor Branch, then renamed "East Hinsdale" in 1887. That same year, the station gained a control tower known as "Tower #47." Apparently due to the presence of the florist John Lewis Childs, the station was renamed "Floral Park" by 1890.

On January 1, 1881, Austin Corbin took over the Long Island Rail Road and sought out to install new rails on the Main Line from Winfield Junction to Jamaica. In February 1881, all service on the Main Line was halted, and this station was temporarily abandoned at this time. Starting in April, the old rails were torn up and used on the South Side Railroad of Long Island. The temporary abandonment inconvenienced visitors to the Cemetery, and during this period, the managers of the cemetery made arrangements to have visitors transported free of charge to the Richmond Hill station on the Montauk Division.

The tracks were relaid during September and October 1882, and the line was rebuilt as a double-track line with iron rails. The line was reopened on October 25, 1882 for freight only to allow the Montauk Division to be exclusively used for passenger service. Service resumed on May 30, 1883 with one daily train in each direction after the managers of the cemetery made a request to the directors of the Long Island Rail Road. In 1886, the station was moved 40 feet (12 m) to provide space for a lawn and flowerbed.

After Hopedale station closed in 1884, this was the only station on the Main Line between Winfield and Jamaica, and as of 1897, the line was mostly used for freight, with the exception of some passenger service during commuting hours.

The line was double-tracked to Hicksville in 1890.

=== Early 20th century ===
The line was electrified to Queens Village and Belmont Park on October 2, 1905. On May 26, 1908, the line was electrified to Floral Park; Hempstead Branch stations southeast of Floral Park were electrified on the same date. The line was triple-tracked between Bellerose and Floral Park in 1908.

Around the same time, the construction of Pennsylvania Station and Sunnyside Yard necessitated the construction of a new grade-separated route within Woodside to increase train capacity, which was limited by the previous at-grade routing. Land acquisition for this reroute, dubbed the "Woodside/Winfield Cut-Off", starting in 1908.

In order to provide fast service for the opening of the Pennsylvania Railroad's East River Tunnels in 1910, the Long Island Rail Road completely rebuilt the Main Line between Winfield and Jamaica from one track to four tracks, with two additional tracks between the Glendale Cut-Off and Winfield. 40 grade crossings were eliminated as part of the project. In addition, the line was electrified using a third rail. This was expected to reduce the running time between Jamaica and Sunnyside Yard from 18 minutes to 12 minutes.

==== Maple Grove Cut-off ====
To speed up service through Kew Gardens, the LIRR undertook the construction of the Maple Grove Cut-Off for $500,000. The Cut-Off shortened the Main Line by 328 feet (100 m), and sped up service with the construction of a new straightened four-track route that ran at a lower grade. The Cut-Off branched from the original line about 400 feet (120 m) north of Ascan Avenue in Forest Hills, and continued to 84th Drive in Kew Gardens, or about 700 feet (210 m) east of Lefferts Avenue. The original line ran straight from Winfield to within a few feet of Queens Boulevard at Lefferts Avenue (now Boulevard) and then curved sharply southeast around the southern edge of Maple Grove Cemetery, slowing service.

The land for the right-of-way to the west of Lefferts Avenue was acquired from the Cord Meyer Development Corporation, while the land to the east was purchased from Alrick Man, the founder of the urban neighborhood of Richmond Hill. While he had to sell the property of the Richmond Hill Golf Club and 25 acres of estate, he still owned a lot of the land in Richmond Hill, and therefore financially benefitted from the move. Since the golf course was going to be cut in half by the railroad, Man closed the course in 1906, and decided to sell the course and turn it into a residential community. The right-of-way initially had room for six tracks, of which four tracks were built. The two additional tracks would have been used for freight. The LIRR's right-of-way increased from 50 to 60 feet (15 to 18 m) to 150 feet (46 m). Crystal Lake, which was in the path of the Cut-Off, was drained in 1909. As part of the initial agreement, bridges over the new right-of-way were to be built over Quentin Road (now 80th Road) and Lefferts Avenue.

The Maple Grove station was moved from its location 500 feet (150 m) south of Kew Gardens Road (old Newtown Avenue) to a spot 600 feet (180 m) south along the north side of tracks on the west side of Lefferts Avenue, closer to the built-up portion of Richmond Hill. Man built streets through the property of the old golf club, and built elegant homes close to the new railroad station, creating what is known as Kew Gardens today. On November 20, 1908, the New York Public Service Commission approved the LIRR's application to complete the Maple Grove Cut-Off.

Limited construction began on the Cut-Off in November 1908, with real work beginning in March 1909. On December 4, 1908, the New York City Board of Estimate approved the plans for bridges at Union Turnpike and Ascan Avenue, but did not approve the plans for the bridge carrying Quentin Road and Lefferts Avenue over the line as these streets were not yet included on the city's map. The plans were modified in 1909 to add bridges at Penelope Avenue and Ascan Avenue. The grading of the right-of-way and the laying of track was completed by September 1909. On July 26, 1909, eastbound trains started running over the Maple Grove Cut-Off. On July 30, westbound trains began running via the cut-off with its completion. Following the completion of the Cut-Off, riders who patronized the Richmond Hill station on the Montauk Division were concerned that passenger service to their station would be discontinued, requiring them to use the station replacing Maple Grove on the Main Line. The LIRR stated that the station would continue to receive service.

Provisions were left for future crossings at Roman Avenue (72nd Avenue), Puritan Avenue (75th Avenue), and Allegheny Avenue (77th Avenue). The floor system of the Union Turnpike bridge was designed to allow for two trolley tracks to pass over it. All of the bridges completed as part of the project were constructed with concrete floors, heavy steel girders, and watertight steel.

==== Extension to Manhattan ====
On September 8, 1910, the line between Long Island City and Jamaica was electrified, and service to Pennsylvania Station was inaugurated. Initially, service consisted of 101 trains in each direction to the Hempstead, Far Rockaway and Long Beach branches. On September 8, 1910, the new Kew station opened along with the introduction of electric service to Penn Station using the Maple Grove Cut-Off. The first train left the station at 4:14 a.m. The first passenger boarding at Kew was also the first passenger to pass through the gates at Penn Station.

==== Jamaica improvement ====
The present Jamaica station was designed by Kenneth M. Murchison and built between 1912 and 1913 as a replacement for the two former stations in Jamaica. Both former stations were discontinued as station stops. The 1912–13 "Jamaica Improvement" was the final step in consolidating the branch lines of the LIRR. To the west of the station, Jay Interlocking was built, and to the east, Hall Interlocking was constructed. These interlockings allowed any line to reach any other line, allowing easy transfer between lines at Jamaica station, which is the hallmark of current day LIRR service.

When the new Jamaica station opened, residents of Jamaica were dissatisfied with its location; downtown Jamaica was centered around Union Hall Street, 0.6 miles (0.97 km) east of the new station at Sutphin Boulevard and Archer Avenue. The LIRR thus decided to add a new Union Hall Street station in 1913. (The Union Hall Street station closed on May 20, 1977.)

==== Winfield Cut-off ====
Meanwhile, the Winfield relocation project was delayed due to uncertainties about certain portions of the project, such as the new trestle that had to be erected across the under-construction Queens Boulevard near 67th Street, as well as the need to construct the elevated IRT Flushing Line over the new route at 61st Street. Work on the Winfield project resumed in 1912, and the following year, the Dual Contracts finalized the plans for the Flushing Line. The project entailed building six electrified tracks between Woodside and the Winfield Junction station, four for the Main Line and two for the North Side Railroad (now Port Washington Branch), with seven steel viaducts carrying the LIRR diagonally over the intervening street grid. A temporary Woodside station near 61st Street and Woodside Avenue opened in April 1913, replacing the old Woodside station at 39th Avenue and 58th Street. When the project was completed in November 1915, both the temporary Woodside station and the original Winfield Junction station on the old routing were replaced by stations along the new route.

==== Further improvements ====
Work on the Queens Elimination Project, which extended from a point 2,000 feet (610 m) west of Bellerose station to Hollis station, was completed in 1924. As part of the project, five grade crossings, at Hempstead Turnpike, Springfield Boulevard, Bennet Avenue, Wertland Avenue, and Madison Avenue, were eliminated by placing the line on an embankment and constructing bridges, and two new streets were extended underneath the line, at Bellaire Boulevard and Cross Island Boulevard. In addition, the line was four-tracked and electrification was extended to Floral Park. Bellaire and Queens stations were rebuilt with concrete high-level platforms that could accommodate eleven-car trains. Pedestrian subways were constructed between platforms at Floral Park and Bellerose, station platforms at Hillside and Hollis were extended new interlockings were installed at Floral Park and Queens, and an automatic block signaling system was installed between Floral Park and Hillside. Telephone and telegraph lines were constructed as part of the project, as was a freight yard at Queens, and a storage yard east of Floral Park for electric local trains. On December 17, 1923, the first track on the embankment opened for service in the westbound direction. On January 7, 1924, a second track, an eastbound one, opened for service, increasing the completion of the project to 60 percent. With the opening of this track, service in both directions was relocated from the previous level, 20 feet (6.1 m) below the embankment level, to the embankment, allowing the old tracks to be discontinued, and for five grade crossings to be closed. In February 1924, work on the project was expected to be completed in May, though it was completed in the fall. The new station at Bellaire opened on September 20, 1924 with high-level platforms. The project to eliminate the five grade crossings cost $2,500,000, while the project to extend Cross Island Boulevard under the line cost $75,000, and the project to do the same for Bellaire Boulevard (211th Street) cost $60,000.

On January 16, 1923, the Transit Commission ordered the LIRR to eliminate five crossings on the Main Line east of Jamaica station and a crossing at Hillside on the Montauk Division to complete the elimination of grade crossings on the Main Line east of Jamaica within city limits. The LIRR accepted the order and expected to begin construction on the project following the completion of the Queens Elimination project. As part of the project, grade crossings at New York Avenue, Puntine Street, Smith Street, Canal Street, Brenton Avenue with the Main Line, and at South Street with the Montauk Division would be eliminated. Existing grade-separated crossings at Union Hall Street, Washington Street, and Prospect Street, which crossed over the rail line would be modified to be under-grade crossings. At the time, the Main Line tracks were elevated at Jamaica, and then descended on a steep grade to the east of the station to a level 20 feet (6.1 m) lower. After Hillside station, the line went up on a more gradual grade and rose to approximately the same elevation at Jamaica Station at Farmers Avenue in Hollis. All the at-grade crossings in the section were heavily trafficked, and buildings and other obstacles obstructed views of the crossings. The Canal Street crossing had seven tracks, while the others had five tracks. During the summer, car traffic would pile up for several blocks on both sides when the gates at the crossings were down. It was decided to construct the grade separation on an elevated structure rather than in an open cut so as to not interfere with the city sewer system and as it would require ridiculously steep grades. The existing bridges at Prospect Street, Washington Street, and Union Hall Street were very old, had steep grades of over 8 percent on either side. The steep grade starting west of Prospect Street caused many delays for westbound service as trains had to increase speed before going up the grade and could not operate as slowly as would be necessary for efficient train operations at Jamaica.

As part of the plan, the Main Line would be increased to eight tracks, four of which would connect with the four-track right-of-way starting at Hollis. Two tracks would allow freight traffic to go to Holban Yard without having to use the Main Line tracks as was done at the time, and the two other tracks would be used for Montauk Division trains, which would no longer need to cross Main Line tracks at grade. The line would be built on embankment with concrete retaining walls, with all crossings to be made below grade, with a clearance of at least 14 feet (4.3 m). A new street would be carried across the line east of Hillside station. The LIRR planned to replace existing stations at Hillside and Union Hall Streets with more up-to-date facilities with full length concrete high-level platforms. The estimated cost of the project was $2,460,000.

On December 6, 1923, the Transit Commission ordered the LIRR to extend 195th Street under the Main Line in Hollis. Work was complete soon afterwards. Work began on the Jamaica Elimination project in October 1929, and was completed in 1931. At the same time, work was done to extend 177th Street under the Montauk Division. The total cost of the project was $5,897,000. The grade crossings were eliminated by raising the line onto an embankment between retaining walls.

Stations along the Main Line east of Floral Park to Mineola were electrified by October 1926. The Oyster Bay Branch, which left the main line at Mineola, was partially electrified in June 1934 north to East Williston station.

New York City applied to extend 199th Street and 202nd Street across the Main Line in Queens. On September 26, 1928, the Transit Commission ordered to extend 202nd Street across the line below the grade of the line, and to create a pedestrian only underpass for 199th Street. The plans for the crossing at 199th Street were approved on April 17, 1929, while the plans for 202nd Street were approved on August 19, 1931. In 1931, it was expected to begin work in 1932.

On March 17, 1936, at a hearing of the New York State Transit Commission and the New York State Public Service Commission, the LIRR said that it would seek permission in 1937 to abandon the three stations along the Main Line between Jamaica and Pennsylvania Station—Kew Gardens, Forest Hills, and Woodside. The LIRR had said that it anticipated a loss of annual revenue between $750,000 and $1 million with the opening of the extension of the Independent Subway System's Queens Boulevard Line to Jamaica.

Westbridge station closed on January 1, 1939.

=== Signaling upgrades ===
On August 15, 1955, LIRR officials announced that it would install a complicated arrangement of signals and switches to the east of the station within two weeks for nearly $100,000 to allow eastbound express trains in the evening rush hour to bypass the station via the station's westbound tracks. The LIRR was in the process of planning improvements to the station's west to allow westbound express trains in the morning rush hour to run via the station's eastbound tracks.

On July 10, 1956, the LIRR began work on a $750,000 project to install reverse signaling on the 15.7 miles of the Main Line between Divide Interlocking in Hicksville and Hall Interlocking in Jamaica. The project modified existing signaling with remotely-controlled switches. Along with additional crossovers, this would enable peak-direction express trains to bypass local trains by using the track that was currently being used for infrequent reverse-peak service. This would enable running times on existing expresses trains from Hicksville to be reduced, and allow local trains to make additional stops west of Hicksville. Under the existing service plan, the number of stops local trains could make were limited to avert delaying express trains following behind them. On July 10, 1956, to the west of Hicksville, a pre-fabricated bridge that would hold automatic signals was installed. The first 6.3-mile section, between Hicksville and Mineola, was completed in early 1957. Completing this section required the installation of three sets of crossover switches, over 400 electrical relays, housed in 18 steel cabinets, 1,500 feet of pipe for air lines for the operation of switches, and about 42 miles of cable and wire. In December 1957, the project was expected to be completed by the end of the year to Floral Park, and in 1958 to Jamaica. The equipment was provided by the Union Switch and Signal Company.

On April 22, 1957, work began on a $12,500 project to extend the station platform at Hicksville by 470 feet to allow trains to stop without blocking grade crossings at Broadway and Jerusalem Avenue. Work was expected to be complete about May 6. To complete the project, changes were made in the handling of express and freight operations, a switch was moved, and tracks in the freight yard were relocated. The LIRR had completed similar platform extension projects at Manhasset, Bethpage, Westbury, Copiague, Malverne, and Brentwood.

Merillon Avenue station was rebuilt in 1958, featuring a smaller structure, as well as a narrow, 11'6" bridge under the tracks for Nassau Boulevard; this bridge was replaced with a 14"-high bridge as part of the Main Line Expansion Project in October 2019.

In November 1963, the LIRR announced a plan to shorten the platforms at Forest Hills and Kew Gardens by 300 feet (91 m). The railroad's justification was that ridership at the stations was low, and did not warrant repairing the crumbling concrete. These sections of platforms had been installed in about 1929 to allow the stations to accommodate full-length trains. This move was opposed by civic groups, and resulted in an investigation by the Public Service Commission. However, the platform extensions were removed by March 1964. Prior to their removal, the platforms extended to the overpass at 82nd Avenue (formerly known as Onslow Place). A staircase from each platform allowed passengers to enter and leave the station from its western end.

=== Grade-crossing eliminations and electrification to Huntington ===
On September 12, 1964, a grade-crossing elimination project at Hicksville was completed, with the new station being located on an elevated structure. The $15 million project eliminated seven grade-crossings, provided 556 parking spaces, and rebuilt the Hicksville station as a three-track station with two 1,235 foot (376 m)-long island platforms. The parking spaces were built along the old at-grade right-of-way. A grade crossing at Charlotte Avenue to the west of the station was removed in 1969.

The LIRR was acquired by New York State in 1965 and was put under the control of the Metropolitan Commuter Transportation Authority (MCTA). It authorized engineering studies for the extension of electrified service along the Main Line from Mineola to Hicksville, then along the Port Jefferson Branch to Huntington. On June 13, 1967 the LIRR received a $22,697,500 federal grant from the Urban Mass Transportation Administration (UMTA) for the project. The total cost was estimated at $45 million. Construction on the project began in 1968. On October 19, 1970, the LIRR's $69 million electrification project from Mineola to Huntington was completed. The project was funded through grants from UMTA and a New York State Transportation bond issue. 16 miles (26 km) of track were electrified as part of the project. Diesel service on this section was replaced with electric service running directly to Penn Station, eliminating the need to change at Jamaica, and saving passengers an average of 15 minutes. This was the LIRR's first new electrification project since 1925.

Union Hall Street closed on May 20, 1977. Some people in the area were already under the impression the station was closed. Some time before, wire fences were installed to seal Union Street, which passes under the station, to car traffic. An opening was left to allow people to reach the staircases to the platforms.

In October 1979, work began on a $525,000 project to extend the platforms at New Hyde Park station to accommodate ten-car trains. At the time, the westbound platform was eight cars long, while the eastbound platform was four cars long. The work, which also required some renovations to the station building, was expected to be completed in four months.

On February 1, 1980, the LIRR, in response to audit released by the state comptroller on November 16, 1979, submitted a proposal to close 29 stations, including Kew Gardens, to save $250,000. The audit evaluated ticket sales in 1976, and recommended that stations with fewer than 60 transactions per hour be closed. Thirty-nine LIRR stations fell in to this category, but ten were not recommended for closure, either because they were terminals or switch locations. In addition to Kew Gardens, Forest Hills, East Hampton, Westhampton, Sea Cliff and Locust Valley would be completely closed. The other stations would have been closed on weekends, every day but Monday, or closed half of the day.

=== Electrification to Ronkonkoma ===
As part of the MTA's first capital program, the signaling system on the Main Line between Jamaica and Penn Station would be upgraded to reduce congestion and allow for increased capacity. The project would construct a new control center at Penn Station, allowing for remote control of Harold Interlocking, redesign Harold Interlocking, modernize towers and switching systems at Penn Station, and install reverse-signaling on the Main Line, allowing for increased peak direction capacity without adding additional tracks. The signaling project would also install automatic speed control and interlocking improvements. To provide interim benefits from reverse-signaling, one block reverse signaling was installed on the eastbound Main Line 2 track, allowing westbound diesels in the morning peak to head west by signal indication, reducing congestion on the westbound tracks. This operation started in May 1983. These projects were expected to cost $66.2 million. At the time, in 1983, the Main Line west of Jamaica heading to Penn Station was at capacity, with 40 trains using the two Main Line tracks in the peak direction.

In 1983, the LIRR recommended electrifying and double-tracking sections of the Main Line from Farmingdale to Ronkonkoma. As part of the project, four stations would be eliminated (Grumman, Republic, Pine Aire and Deer Park), eight stations would receive high-level platforms (Bethpage, Farmingdale, Pinelawn, Wyandanch, a new Deer Park stop, Brentwood, Central Islip and Ronkonkoma). The platforms at Farmingdale and Bethpage were replaced as part of a separate program. In addition, the line would receive new signaling, additional passing sidings, and a new yard at Ronkonkoma. Double-track would be installed between Deer Park and Brentwood. Initially, a full second track was going to be built between Farmingdale and Ronkonkoma. However, due to funding issues, only passing sidings, and double tracking at some stations was completed. In addition, bridges, substations and most platforms were built to accommodate a second track.

On June 17, 1985 work began on a project to extend electrification from Hicksville to Ronkonkoma. New stations were built at Wyandanch, Deer Park, Brentwood and Central Islip with high-level platforms. On April 30, 1987 electric service was extended by 3 miles (4.8 km) to Bethpage. Electric service was extended to Farmingdale on June 22, 1987. Limited electric service to Ronkonkoma began on December 28, 1987, with full electric service was completed on January 18, 1988. The entire project cost $168 million and electrified 23.5 miles (37.8 km) of track. $49.875 million of the cost was funded by the Urban Mass Transportation Administration. Some of the funding for the project was originally allocated for the construction of a yard in Northport on the Port Jefferson Branch, which would have been part of that branch's electrification project. The electrification of the Port Jefferson Branch became a lesser priority, since the Ronkonkoma Branch runs straight through the center of Long Island through less developed areas, and thus, there was more space to build large park-and-ride facilities along the Ronkonkoma Branch than along the Port Jefferson Branch. Electric service reduced travel time by an average of 26 minutes, and allowed for direct service to Penn Station, eliminating transfers at Hicksville or Jamaica. It was expected that ridership at the stations now in electrified territory would be increased by 4,000 in 1988, attracting ridership from other diesel branches. While the anticipated growth in ridership was expected to take place gradually, it took place within the first month of service. By the 1990s, there was also an increased number of reverse commuters on the LIRR, and further improvements to the Main Line were needed, including the extension of electrification from Ronkonkoma to Yaphank and the installation of a third track from Bellerose to Hicksville.

On April 28, 1998, a bridge over Herricks Road opened, replacing a grade crossing which was once "labeled the most hazardous in the United States by the National Transportation Safety Board." The grade-crossing elimination project was initiated after an incident on March 14, 1982, when a van with ten teenagers got struck at the rail crossing with the crossing gates down, killing nine of them. The project took five years and cost $85 million. Work continued for a year to widen the overpass to allow for a future third track.

On October 30, 2013, the LIRR unveiled a renovated Queens Village station, with passenger elevators, improved lighting, security cameras and a repainted building.

In the Metropolitan Transportation Authority (MTA)'s 2010–2014 capital program, it proposed lengthening the four-car-long platforms at Kew Gardens to allow additional train cars to board at the station. The platform extensions would reduce waiting time at the station while allowing for more efficient operations between Jamaica and Penn Station. Although $4.5 million was allocated for the project, the money was ultimately redistributed to other projects. (Note: A revision to the Capital Program from June 2010 does not include the Kew Gardens platform extension project.) The MTA also recommended lengthening the platforms at Kew Gardens and Forest Hills in its 2015-2034 Twenty-Year Capital Needs Assessment, its strategic vision for capital needs over the twenty year period.

On July 26, 2018, it was announced that the LIRR planned to extend the platforms at Kew Gardens and Forest Hills by 200 feet (61 m) to accommodate six-car trains. The platform extensions will consist of fiberglass decking supported by steel scaffolding structures, allowing the extensions to be completed quickly, and at a low cost, while allowing the LIRR to plan for a permanent solution. Preparation work began during the week of July 23, and the new extensions went into service on September 10, 2018.

== Major infrastructure improvements ==
=== Second track between Farmingdale and Ronkonkoma ===
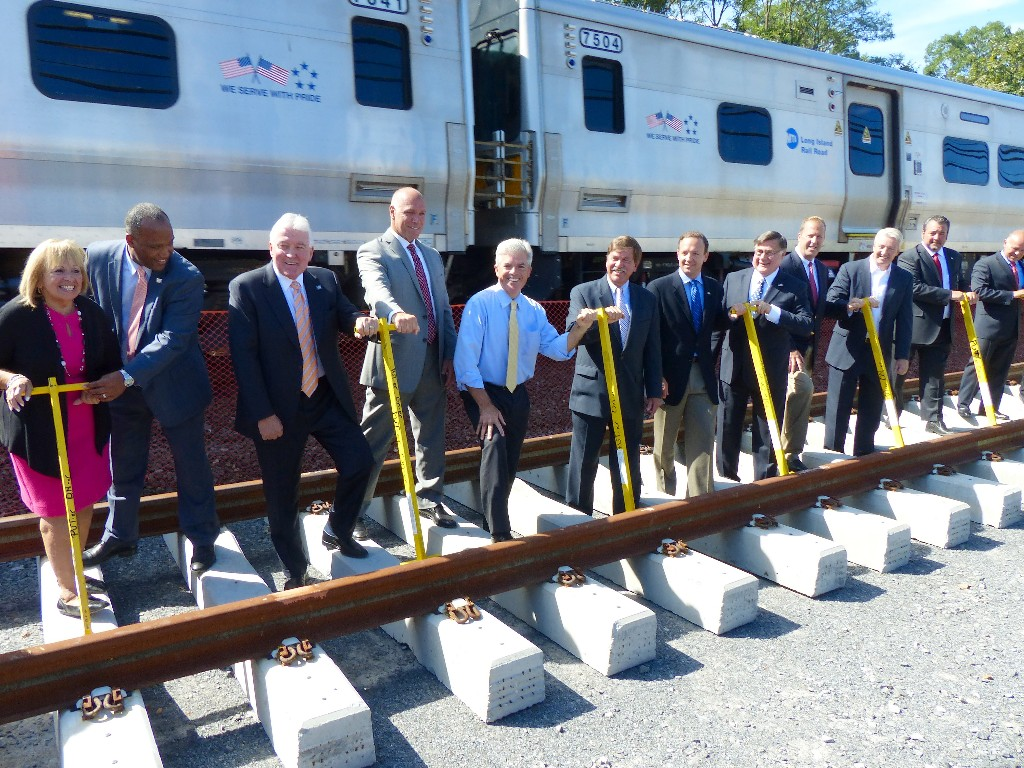
Groundbreaking for Phase 1

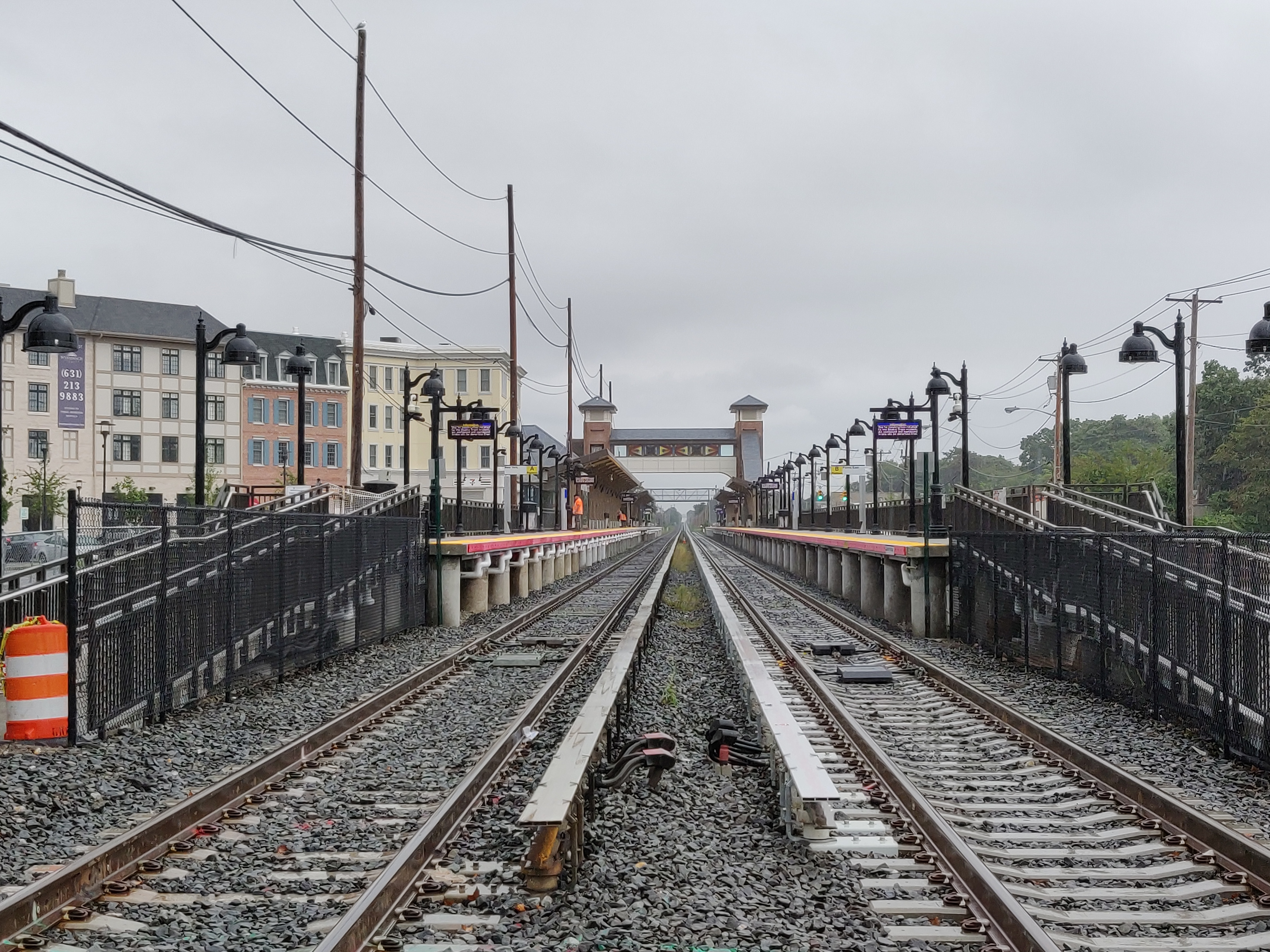
The completed second track, as viewed from the reconstructed Wyandanch station

In 2012, the MTA approved a project to build a second track between Ronkonkoma and Farmingdale. At the time, the only areas east of Farmingdale with two tracks were the segment between Deer Park and Brentwood stations, inclusive; at Central Islip station; and at Ronkonkoma station. Construction of the double track occurred on land that the LIRR has owned since the 1980s, when the land was acquired for the electrification project. The double track project also included upgrades to switches, grade crossings, and station facilities. This project increased operational flexibility by enabling reverse-peak service between Farmingdale and Ronkonkoma and increased off-peak service between Hicksville and Ronkonkoma, with service able to operate half-hourly instead of just hourly. This additional capacity allows the Main Line to better serve as a substitute for South Shore lines in case of a disturbance caused by extreme weather. With the use of the New Track Construction (NTC) method, rail was laid down ten times faster than regular track laying methods, saving $7 million, and allowing the project to be completed 16 months ahead of schedule.

Work on the two-phase project began in August 2015. As part of Phase 1, the section from Ronkonkoma to Central Islip, consisting of 4 miles (6.4 km) of track, was built to the north of the existing track. This section was laid using a NTC machine, followed by the installation of third rail. The southern track at Central Islip was extended to Brentwood to the south of the existing track. Phase 1 was completed in August 2016. As part of Phase 2, a second track was added between Deer Park, through Wyandanch, and past Pinelawn to the east end of FARM interlocking at Republic to the south of the existing track. A design–build contract for this phase was awarded in June 2016. This phase also involved rehabilitating grade crossings, demolishing pedestrian bridges, and building a second platform Wyandanch. Starting in August 2016, to accommodate the second track, supports were pile-driven into the existing embankment near the old site of the Deer Park station, brush was, and embankment was added between Pinelawn and the grade crossing at Little East Neck Road. The last five miles of track were added in January 2018, and the LIRR began connecting the new second track to the existing double-track segments in spring 2018.

The entire project cost $387.2 million and was completed in September 2018, over a year ahead of schedule. As indicated in the MTA's 2015–2034 Capital Needs Assessment, the MTA will extend the double-track to Yaphank if funding is available. This will allow the LIRR to provide additional service in diesel territory, thereby saving travel time.

=== Mid-Suffolk Yard ===
In 2015, the MTA conducted environmental studies to determine the impact of expanding the existing rail yard in Ronkonkoma. This expansion, called the Mid-Suffolk Yard, will add 11 new tracks, increasing the number of total tracks from 12 at present to 23. The expansion will use space already owned by the MTA located immediately to the south of the existing rail yard and north of MacArthur Airport. The increase in storage space will allow the MTA to increase peak-hour service once East Side Access is complete and service to Grand Central begins. The project is budgeted for $76.6 million. Locations in Deer Park, Central Islip, and Yaphank were also considered for the construction of the yard. The Deer Park option was dismissed as it would have impacted several grade crossings, duplicated employee facilities and as it would not have benefited riders east of the station. The Central Islip site was dismissed as it would have been located in Connetquot River State Park. The Yaphank option was rejected because of the high cost of electrification and the requirement that Medford and Yaphank stations receive upgrades. Construction was expected to be finished by late 2018, but the completion date was pushed back to September 2020.

=== Possible reopening of Republic station ===
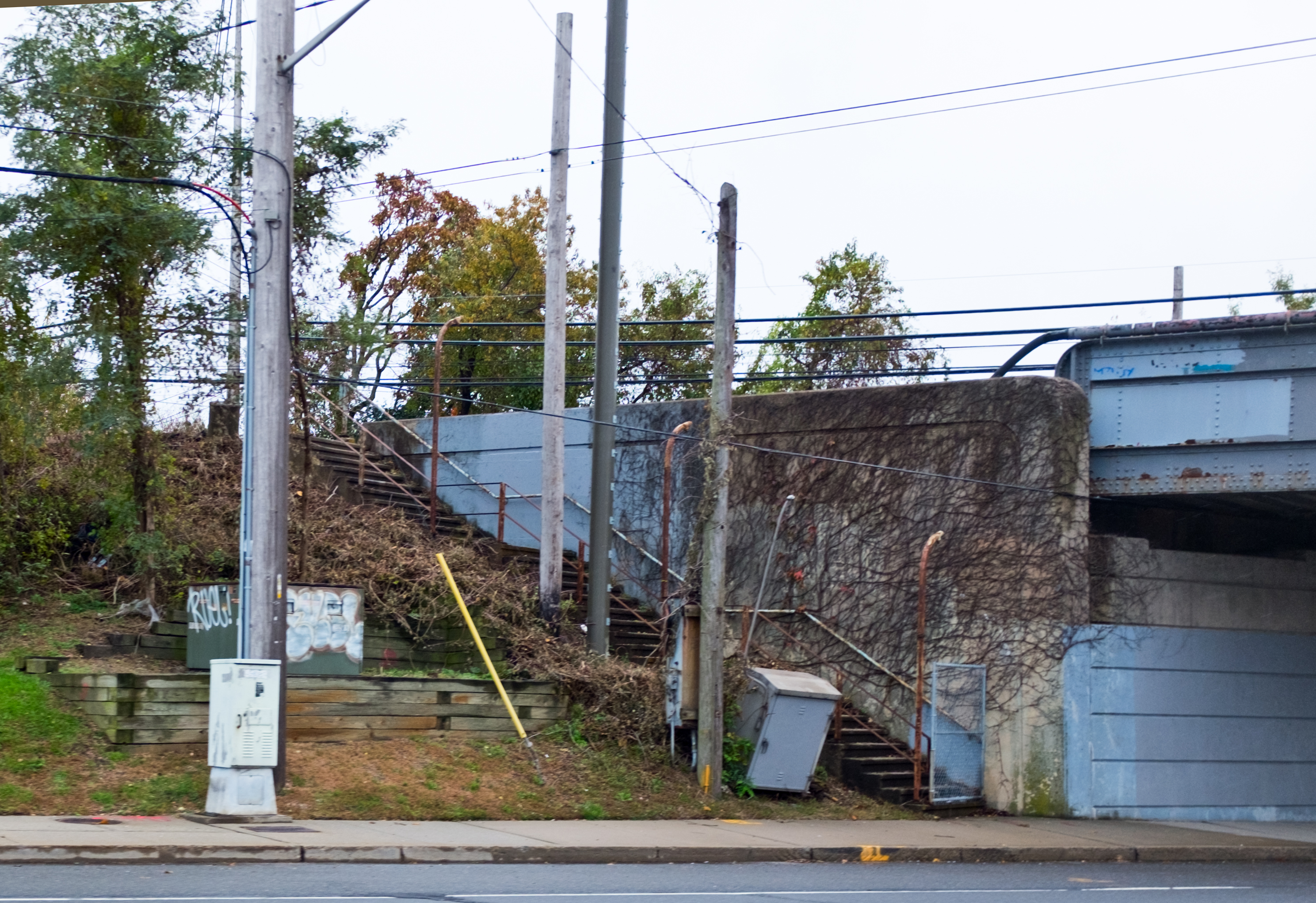
Staircase to former Republic station

The MTA plans to reopen Republic station, which is located between Farmingdale and Pinelawn. The station closed in 1987 as part of the electrification project between Hicksville and Ronkonkoma, and was only used by about a dozen riders daily, not making it cost-effective to upgrade the station to support electric railcars. However, since its closure, there has been an increased amount of commercial and residential development along the Route 110 corridor near the station, a major north–south commercial route. The reopened station would serve this corridor. Funding for the station was deferred from the MTA's 2010–2014 budget due to budgetary issues, but was revived in 2012. The MTA budgeted $5 million in 2015 to design a new station and carry out environmental studies, although construction itself has not been funded yet. The rebuilt station will have two new 12-car platforms, and ADA-compliant ramps.

=== Third track between Floral Park and Hicksville ===
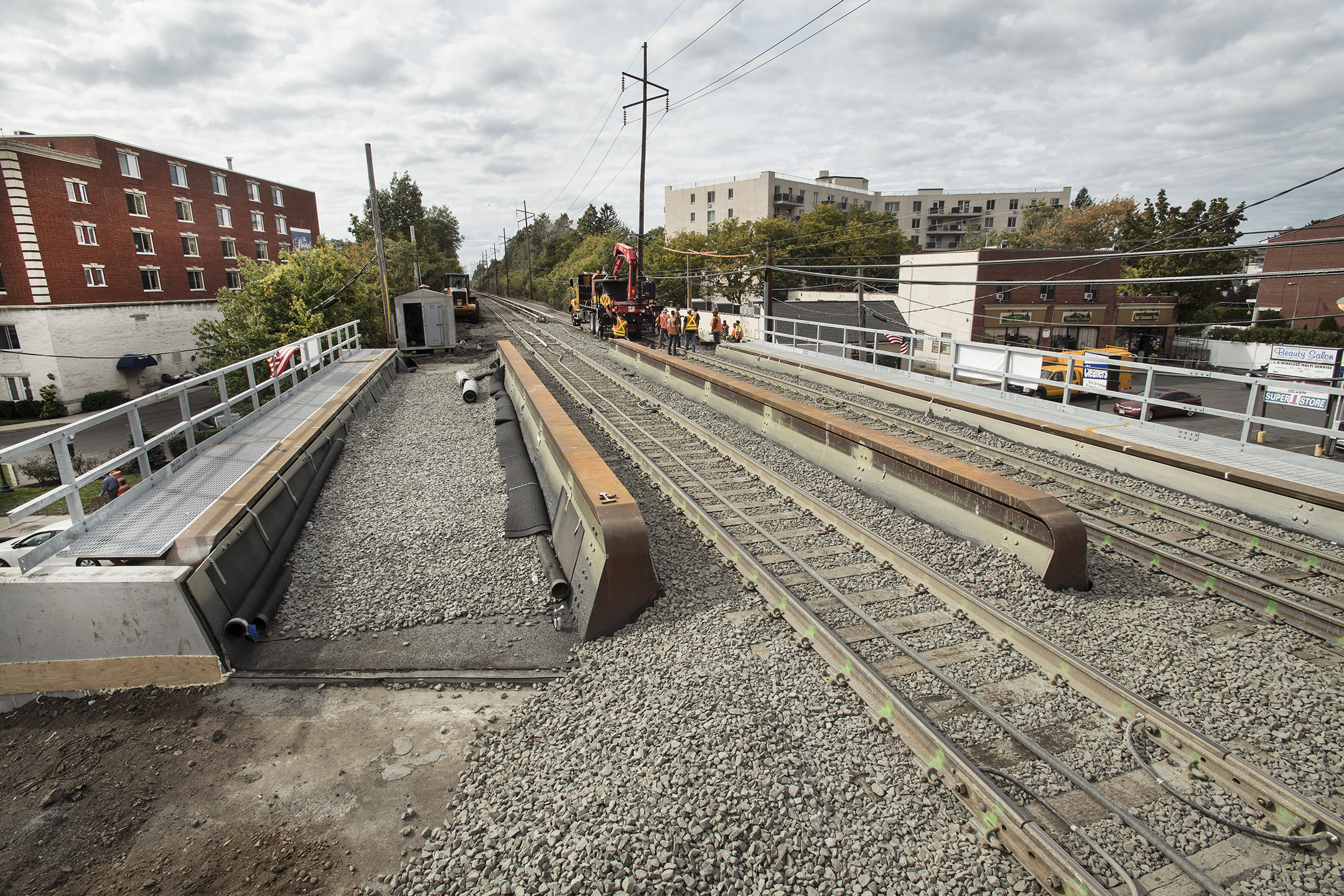
The Post Avenue Bridge near Westbury station, which was replaced in October 2017 to accommodate a third track

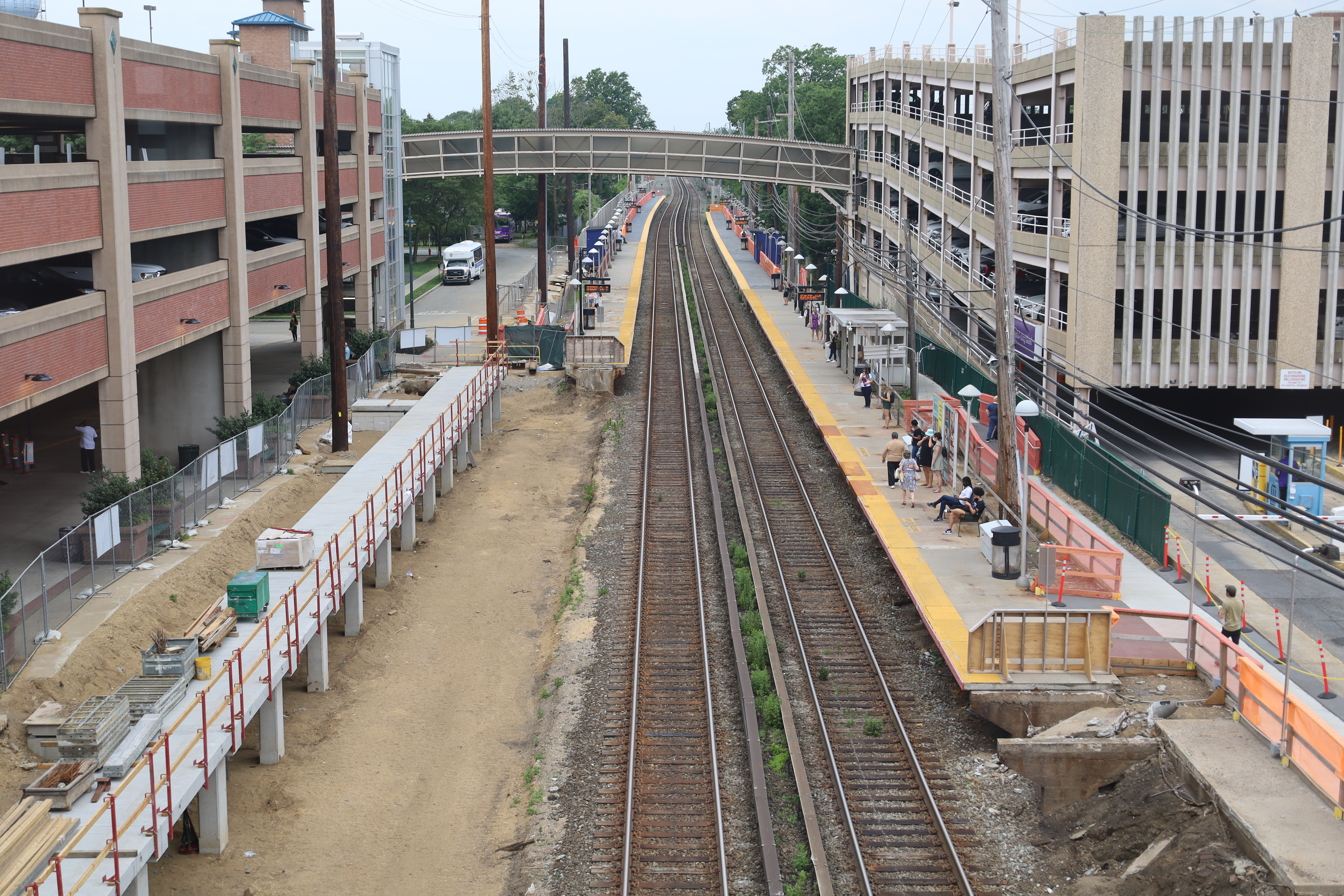
Construction of new platforms at the Mineola station in 2021 to accommodate the third track

To accommodate a projected increase in Long Island Rail Road ridership following completion of the East Side Access project to Grand Central Terminal, and to expand local and reverse-peak service, a third track was built on the Main Line between Floral Park and Hicksville. The construction project, also known as the LIRR Expansion Project, included purchasing properties in the track's right of way, eliminating grade crossings (in conjunction with New York State Department of Transportation), relocating existing stations, and reconfiguring Mineola Station. The project was stalled by fierce opposition from the villages of Floral Park, New Hyde Park, and Garden City, which advocated that construction and the resulting increased train service will reduce the quality of life in their neighborhoods. These villages did, however, support the station improvements and the elimination of grade crossings that the LIRR has planned in conjunction with the third track, and called for the LIRR to complete them in lieu of third track expansion, but the MTA has long insisted that a third track is a necessary component of LIRR's East Side Access expansion. In March 2015, LIRR president Patrick Nowakowski declared that the LIRR would not proceed with the project without the support of the local communities.

Small segments of the third track already existed: one segment between Merillon Avenue and Mineola, built in the vicinity of Herricks Road during the grade crossing elimination project that took place in 1998, and another was built during a 2014–2018 renovation project at Hicksville station, which connected Track 1 at Hicksville station to the North Siding track located about 3,000 feet (910 m) west of the station. This short segment would eventually become the eastern end of the Third Track, and already allowed for a slight increase in peak-hour service upon its completion. The MTA had also left provisions for a third track in construction of other infrastructure along the line, such as the Mineola Intermodal Center located adjacent to Mineola station, Mineola Boulevard Bridge, Roslyn Road Underpass in Mineola, and the replacement Ellison Avenue Bridge over the Main Line in Westbury.

In January 2016, Governor Andrew Cuomo announced a transportation improvement plan which included several million dollars in funding to restart third track development. Governor Cuomo said that unlike previous third track proposals, his plan would involve building the third track within existing LIRR right of way, which would reduce the number of existing homes and businesses affected by installation of the third track. While previous proposals would have affected around 250 properties, 80 of which were homes, Governor Cuomo's proposal would only require taking small amounts of property from 50 properties in total, including around 20 homes. This reduction in properties affected was accomplished by shifting the alignments of tracks in some areas to make room for the third track within the right-of-way and building a shorter third track than previous proposals, resulting in a 9.8-mile (15.8 km) three-track segment starting at Floral Park (the easternmost station shared by the Hempstead Branch and Main Line, where the Hempstead Branch and Main Line split from a 4-track corridor into two distinct pairs of tracks), instead of the previously planned 11.5-mile (18.5 km) segment starting from Queens Village. Despite the promise of mitigation efforts, several local politicians denounced the governor's plan within a day of its announcement; Floral Park's mayor told The New York Times that "we thought this was dead and buried", while New Hyde Park's mayor pledged to "fight the governor vehemently on this" and a local state senator called the governor's plan "dead on arrival."

In December 2017, the LIRR awarded a contract for the project to the consortium 3rd Track Constructors for $1.8 billion, with construction beginning in 2018 and completion estimated for 2022. The first part of the contract included the reconstruction of the Carle Place, Mineola, and Floral Park stations; the construction or reconstruction of six railroad crossings and underpasses; and the construction of a parking structure at Mineola station. A groundbreaking ceremony for the Third Track project was held on September 5, 2018. All eight grade crossings in the Third Track construction area were removed by February 2021. The first phase of the third track opened on August 15, 2022, and a second phase opened on August 30. The entirety of the third track was complete by October 3, 2022.

=== New Elmont-UBS Arena station ===
The MTA built the Elmont-UBS Arena station in Elmont, New York, as part of the Belmont Park redevelopment in the early 2020s. The station includes two new 12-car platforms, and ADA-compliant elevators. The eastbound platform opened first on November 20, 2021. The westbound platform officially opened on October 6, 2022.

On December 15, 2021, the MTA Board awarded a contract for the installation of new switches and signals at Queens Interlocking.

== Stations ==
This list details which Main Line services stop at each station, but not all trains stop at every station. "○" indicates that select trains of a branch may stop at a given station, but this may not be indicated in the branch timetable. Once a service leaves the Main Line, its cells are filled in black.

Zone	Location	Services					Station	Miles (km) (Note: Distance from Long Island City station)	Date opened	Date closed	Connections and notes
Zone	Location	HS	OB	PJ	MT	RK	Station	Miles (km)	Date opened	Date closed	Connections and notes
1 (Note: Part of the City Terminal Zone)	Long Island City, Queens		●	●	●		Long Island City (rush hours, peak direction only)	0.0 (0)	1854		New York City Subway: (at Vernon Boulevard–Jackson Avenue); MTA Bus: Q101, Q103; NYC Ferry: East River Ferry; Served only by 7 AM peak trains and 5 PM peak trains daily
1	Long Island City, Queens		●	●	●		Hunterspoint Avenue (rush hours, peak direction only)	0.6 (0.97)	1860		New York City Subway: (at Hunters Point Avenue); New York City Bus: B62, Q67; MTA Bus: Q101; Served only by 11 AM peak trains and 10 PM peak trains daily
1	Woodside, Queens	●		●		●	Woodside	3.1 (5.0)	1869		Long Island Rail Road: ■ Port Washington Branch; New York City Subway: (at 61st Street–Woodside); MTA Bus: Q18, Q32, Q53 SBS, Q70 SBS
1	Maspeth, Queens						Winfield Junction		1864	1929	
1	Elmhurst, Queens						Grand Street		1913	1925	
1	Rego Park, Queens						Rego Park		1928	1962	
1	Rego Park, Queens						Matawok		1922	1925	
1	Forest Hills, Queens	●		●		●	Forest Hills	6.7 (10.8)	1906		New York City Subway: (at Forest Hills–71st Avenue); MTA Bus: Q23, Q60, Q64, Q74
1	Kew Gardens, Queens										
1	Kew Gardens, Queens						Hopedale		1875	c. 1884	
1	Kew Gardens, Queens	●		●		●	Kew Gardens	7.7 (12.4)	1879		New York City Subway: (at Kew Gardens–Union Turnpike); New York City Bus: Q45, Q46, Q48, QM63, QM64, QM68; MTA Bus: Q10, Q37, Q60, Q80, QM18, QM65; Originally named Maple Grove, then Kew
1	Richmond Hill, Queens						Westbridge		1916	1939	Originally named High Bridge
1	Richmond Hill, Queens						Dunton		1897	1939	
3	Jamaica, Queens	●	●	●	●	●	Jamaica	9.3 (15.0)	1836		Long Island Rail Road: ■ Atlantic Branch, ■ Babylon Branch, ■ Far Rockaway Branch, ■ Long Beach Branch, ■ West Hempstead Branch; New York City Subway: (at Sutphin Boulevard–Archer Avenue–JFK Airport); New York City Bus: Q1, Q20, Q24, Q30, Q31, Q43, Q44 SBS, Q54, Q56, Q75; MTA Bus: Q6, Q8, Q9, Q25, Q40, Q41, Q60, Q65; Nassau Inter-County Express: n4 AirTrain JFK: ■ Jamaica Train
3	Jamaica, Queens						Union Hall Street		1890	1976	Originally named New York Avenue
3	Jamaica, Queens						Canal Street		1853	1899	
3	Jamaica, Queens						Hillside		c. 1909; May 15, 1911	1911; 1966	
3	Jamaica, Queens	●		●		●	Hillside Facility	11.0 (17.7)	1991		Employee-only station
3	Jamaica, Queens						Rockaway Junction		1875 or 1890	c. 1905	Also known as Woodhull Park
3	Hollis, Queens										
3	Hollis, Queens						Willow Tree		March 1, 1837	June 1872	
3	Hollis, Queens	●		○		○	Hollis	11.5 (18.5)	1885		New York City Bus: Q2, Q3; MTA Bus: Q110; Originally named East Jamaica
3	Queens Village, Queens										
3	Queens Village, Queens						Bellaire		1837	1972	Originally named Flushing Avenue, then Brushville, then Interstate Park, then Brushville Road
3	Queens Village, Queens	●		○		○	Queens Village	13.2 (21.2)	1881		New York City & MTA Bus: Q27, Q36, Q88, Q110; Nassau Inter-County Express: n24
4
4	Elmont	●		○		○	Elmont-UBS Arena		2021–2022 (Note: Eastbound platform opened November 20, 2021; westbound platform opened October 6, 2022)		New York City & MTA Bus: Q2, Q36, Q82, Q110; Nassau Inter-County Express: n1, n6, n24
4	Floral Park	●		○		○	Floral Park	14.9 (24.0)	c. 1870		Originally named Plainfield, then Stewart Junction, then Hinsdale, then East Hinsdale
4	New Hyde Park			●		○	New Hyde Park	16.2 (26.1)	1845		Nassau Inter-County Express: n24, n25 Originally named Hyde Park
4	Garden City Park			●		○	Merillon Avenue	17.3 (27.8)	1837		Originally named Clowesville, then Garden City
4	Mineola		●	●	○	●	Mineola	18.6 (29.9)	1837		Nassau Inter-County Express: n15, n22, n22X, n23, n24, n40 Originally named Hempstead, then Branch or Hempstead Branch
7	Carle Place			●		○	Carle Place	20.4 (32.8)	1837		Nassau Inter-County Express: n22 Originally named Carll Place
7	Westbury			●		○	Westbury	21.4 (34.4)	1837		Nassau Inter-County Express: n22, n35
7	New Cassel						New Cassel		November 1875	Unknown (Note: The station was open until at least 1877, when it was served by one westbound train. In 1891, a large area of land was purchased in New Cassel to create a village by Jacob Hicks and Joshua Romell. As part of their development, they proposed reopening the railroad depot. An 1893 article in The Port Jefferson Echo reported that the station would be reopened. The station was on a 1898 station list, but was not on the list of 1900. The former depot was later moved to the north side of Railroad Avenue and the north side of Rushmore Street.)	
7	Hicksville			●	○	●	Hicksville	24.8 (39.9)	1837		Nassau Inter-County Express: n20H, n22, n22X, n48, n49, n78, n79, n80 Suffolk County Transit: Long Island Express
7	Bethpage										
7	Bethpage						Grumman		1942	1985	
7	Bethpage					●	Bethpage	27.9 (44.9)	c. 1854		Originally named Jerusalem, then Central Park
7	Bethpage						Bethpage Junction			1873	
7	Farmingdale					●	Farmingdale	30.2 (48.6)	1841		Nassau Inter-County Express: n70
9	Farmingdale										
9	Farmingdale						Republic		1940	1987	
9	East Farmingdale					●	Pinelawn (limited service)	32.4 (52.1)	c. 1890		Originally named Melville
9	Wyandanch					●	Wyandanch	34.7 (55.8)	1875		Suffolk County Transit: 3, 12; Originally named West Deer Park, then Wyandance
9	Baywood										
9	Baywood						Edgewood		1892	1914	
9	Baywood					●	Deer Park	38.4 (61.8)	1842		Suffolk County Transit: 4 Tanger Shuttle Bus
9	Brentwood										
9	Brentwood						Thompson		1842	1869	
9	Brentwood						Pineaire		1915	1986	
10	Brentwood					●	Brentwood	41.1 (66.1)	1870		Suffolk County Transit: 4, 5, 7, 11, 58; Originally named Modern Times
10	Central Islip										
10	Central Islip						Suffolk		1842	1873	
10	Central Islip					●	Central Islip	43.6 (70.2)	1873		Suffolk County Transit: 4, 6, 17, 52A, 52B
10	Islandia						Nichols Road				
10	Ronkonkoma										
10	Ronkonkoma						Lakeland		1843	1883	Originally named Lake Road
10	Ronkonkoma					●	Ronkonkoma	48.6 (78.2)	1883		Suffolk County Transit: 51, 52A, 52B, Long Island Express; Eastern terminus of electrification, originally named Lake Ronkonkoma
10	Ronkonkoma						Hermanville		1850		
10	Holbrook						Holbrook		1907	1962	
10	Holtsville						Holtsville		1843	1998	Originally named Waverly
10	Medford					○	Medford	54.1 (87.1)	1844		
10	Yaphank										
10	Yaphank						Bartlett's		1844	1880	Originally named Bellport
10	Yaphank						Fire Place		June 26, 1844	1845	
12	Yaphank										
12	Yaphank						Yaphank	58.6 (94.3)	1845	2026	Originally named Milleville
12	East Yaphank					○	Yaphank–BNL	61.7 (99.3)	2026		Replaced Yaphank on July 18, 2026.
12	East Yaphank						Carman's River		June 26, 1844	June 14, 1845	
12	Upton						Upton Road		1918	1922	
12	Upton						Camp Upton		1917	1922	
12	Manorville						Wampmissic		c. 1847–1848		
12	Manorville						Manorville		1844	c. 1968	Originally named St. George's Manor, then Manor
12	Calverton						Calverton		1852; 1880	1858; 1981	Originally named Hulse Turnout, then Baiting Hollow
14	Riverhead					○	Riverhead	73.3 (118.0)	1844		Suffolk County Transit: 58, 62, 66, 80, 92, Long Island Express
14	Aquebogue						Aquebogue		June 1892	July 1967	
14	Jamesport						Jamesport		1844	1985	
14	Laurel						Laurel			1967	
14	Mattituck					○	Mattituck	82.4 (132.6)	1844		Suffolk County Transit: 92
14	Cutchogue						Cutchogue		1844	1962	
14	Peconic						Peconic		1844	1970	Originally named Hermitage
14	Southold					○	Southold	90.1 (145.0)	1844		Suffolk County Transit: 92
14	Greenport					○	Greenport	94.3 (151.8)	1844		Suffolk County Transit: 92; North Ferry
