= Wampmissic station =

Former train station in New York, US

Wampmissic

General information
- Location: LIRR at North Street, Manorville, New York
- Coordinates: 40.858833°N 72.843589°W
- Owner: LIRR
- Line: Main Line

History
- Opened: 1847–1848
- Former names: Wampmissick
Location

Wampmissick or Wampmissic was a station on the Main Line of the Long Island Rail Road.

== History ==
Wampmissick was named after the Native American name for extensive swamps 2 miles (3.2 km) west of Manorville. Wampmissick was 4 miles (6.4 km) east of Yaphank and 2 miles (3.2 km) west of Manor. After James Wick, also known as James H. Weeks, became the president of the LIRR in 1847 he built a large woodhouse and turntable at Wampmissic and had trains stop at Wampmissic because he owned a large farm and woodlands here. He had hoped to boom his property but when he ceased to be president the buildings were torn down. The station was built in the years 1847–1848 when Wick was president. The station is mentioned in the Annual Report of the American Institute, on the Subject of Agriculture, Volume 6, and in the Annual Report of the American Institute of the City of New York also in 1848, which describes a growth of herd grass by the train. Near the present-day location of the station are streets, Weeks Avenue and North Weeks Avenue, that bear his name. The station is mentioned in the American Railway Guide, and Pocket Companion, for the United States from 1851, although no trains are listed as stopping there. It only appears on the 1852–1853 timetable. It was also used as a meeting and passing location. It also appears on an 1855 map, and in A New and Complete Statistical Gazetteer of the United States from 1855. The station appears again in 1857 in Mitchell's New Traveller's Guide.

A siding at this location bore the name Wampmissic on the 1916 LIRR valuation plans and in the LIRR's 1924 CR4 book which indicted freight siding locations.
