= New Hyde Park station =

Long Island Rail Road station in Nassau County, New York

New Hyde Park
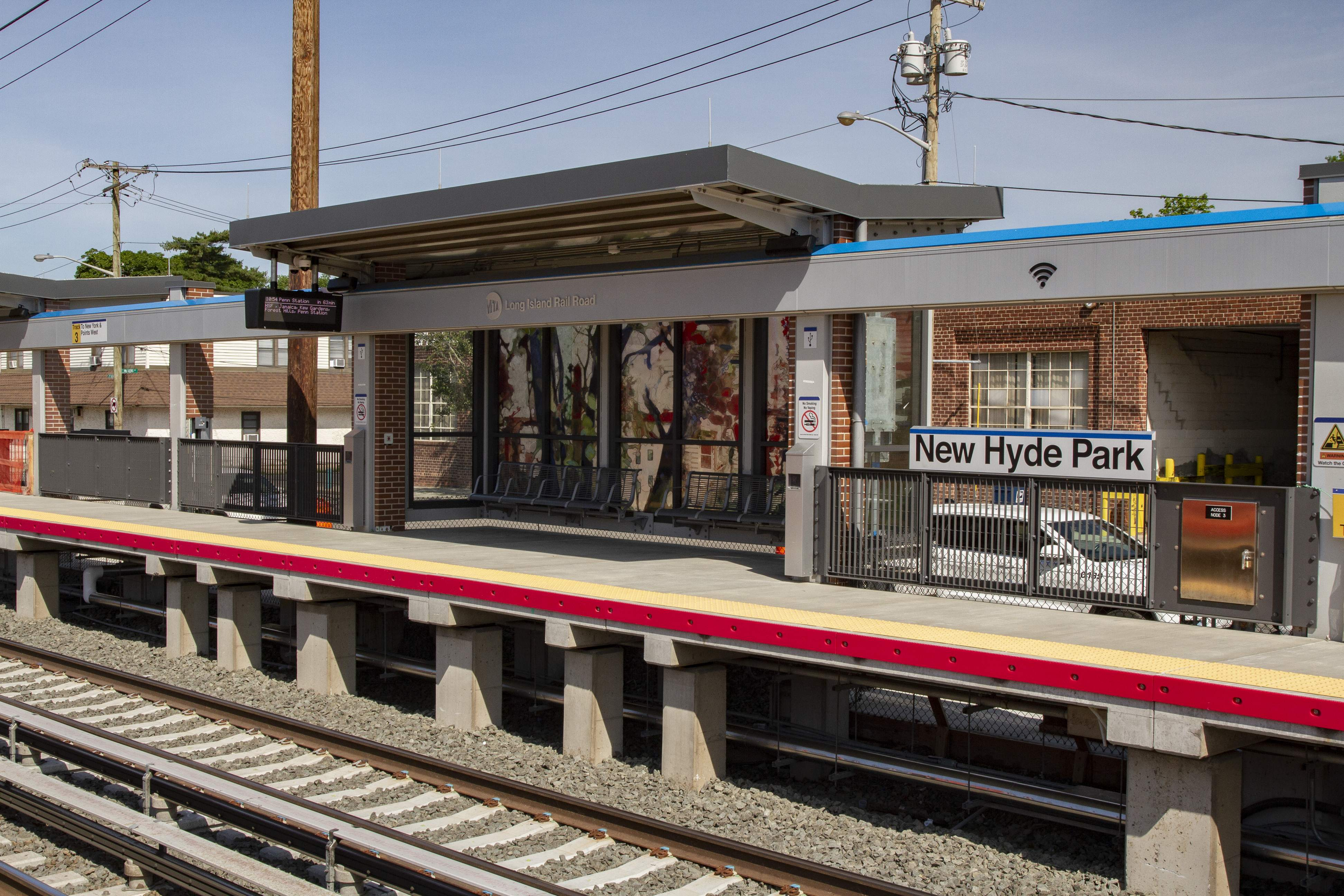
- New Hyde Park station in August 2022

General information
- Location: New Hyde Park Road & Second Avenue; New Hyde Park, NY
- Coordinates: 40.730932°N 73.680569°W
- Owner: Long Island Rail Road
- Line: Main Line
- Distance: 16.2 mi (26.1 km) from Long Island City
- Platforms: 2 side platforms
- Tracks: 3
- Connections: Nassau Inter-County Express: n24, n25

Construction
- Parking: Yes
- Cycle facilities: Yes
- Accessible: yes

Other information
- Station code: NHP
- Fare zone: 4

History
- Opened: 1845
- Rebuilt: 1870, 1947, 2002–2003, 2021
- Electrified: October 1926; 750 V (DC) third rail
- Former names: Hyde Park (1845–1904)

Passengers
- 2012—2014: 3,984 per weekday

Services
Preceding station	Long Island Rail Road	Following station
Floral Park toward Penn Station, Grand Central or Long Island City	Port Jefferson Branch	Merillon Avenue toward Huntington or Port Jefferson
Oyster Bay Branch does not stop here
Ronkonkoma Branch does not stop here
Montauk Branch does not stop here
Former services
Preceding station	Long Island Rail Road	Following station
Floral Park toward Long Island City or Penn Station	Main Line	Merillon Avenue toward Greenport
Location

New Hyde Park is a station on the Long Island Rail Road's Main Line. It is located at New Hyde Park Road and Second Avenue within the villages of New Hyde Park and Garden City, in Nassau County, New York, United States. The station is wheelchair accessible and had two grade crossings on either side of the station until late 2020; both were subsequently demolished and turned into underpasses.

The New Hyde Park station is only listed on the Port Jefferson Branch timetable and most service is provided by that branch.

== History ==
=== Early history ===
The Long Island Rail Road was built through the area in 1837, although no station was built until 1845. It was originally named "Hyde Park" station, and was rebuilt in 1870. Despite Hyde Park changing its name to "New Hyde Park" in March 1871 in order to avoid confusion with another Hyde Park in Dutchess County, the LIRR kept the original name of the station until September 1904. The 1870-built station was located along the eastbound tracks with an open wooden shelter shed along the westbound tracks. This station contained elaborate gingerbread woodwork, similar to that of Yaphank station during the same period.

=== Station renovations ===
In 1947, the station house was rebuilt again with a smaller and less elaborate brick structure, and relocated along the westbound tracks, with a matching brick open shelter along the eastbound tracks. Sometime during the 1960s, high-level platforms were added to the station, with a white stucco wall between the platforms and station house containing a blue sign with white lettering reading "LONG ISLAND RAIL ROAD" on top and "NEW HYDE PARK VILLAGE" on the bottom. This was replaced between 2002 and 2003 with the retro-classic structure seen today.

In October 1979, work began on a $525,000 project to extend the platforms at the station to accommodate ten-car trains. At the time, the westbound platform was eight cars long, while the eastbound platform was four cars long. The work, which also required some renovations to the station building, was expected to be completed in four months.

As part of the Main Line third track project, the New Hyde Park station received significant upgrades, and Platform B was relocated. The two platforms were demolished and replaced by 8 foot (2.4 m)-wide platforms that can handle 12-car trains. Canopies, benches, signage, and security cameras were installed, and the new platforms are heated to facilitate snow removal. The station was made compliant with the Americans with Disabilities Act of 1990 via the installation of two ramps to each platform – and four and five new staircases were built connecting to the westbound and eastbound platforms, respectively, while an underpass was constructed under the tracks. Amenities such as Wi-Fi, USB charging stations, artwork, and digital information displays were included in the renovation, and electrical substation at the New Hyde Park station was replaced to make way for the third track.

Additionally, the grade crossing at New Hyde Park Road was eliminated and replaced with a vehicular underpass. The road was closed on February 3, 2020 and the crossing was eliminated in summer 2020; the underpass opened to traffic on August 24, 2020. A new park-and-ride facility was built between Plaza and Second Avenues. On October 24, 2020 the 12th Street grade crossing at the west end of the station was closed permanently to traffic, and in early 2021 was replaced with a pedestrian underpass.

== Station layout ==
This station has two high-level side platforms, each 12 cars long. At the height of rush hour, especially during the morning rush, both tracks are used in the peak direction. The westbound platform has the only station house and parking lot. Each platform has a staircase at South 12th Street on the western end and New Hyde Park Road on the eastern end. An ADA-accessible pedestrian underpass is located where the 12th Street grade crossing used to exist.

== Image gallery ==
New Hyde Park LIRR station

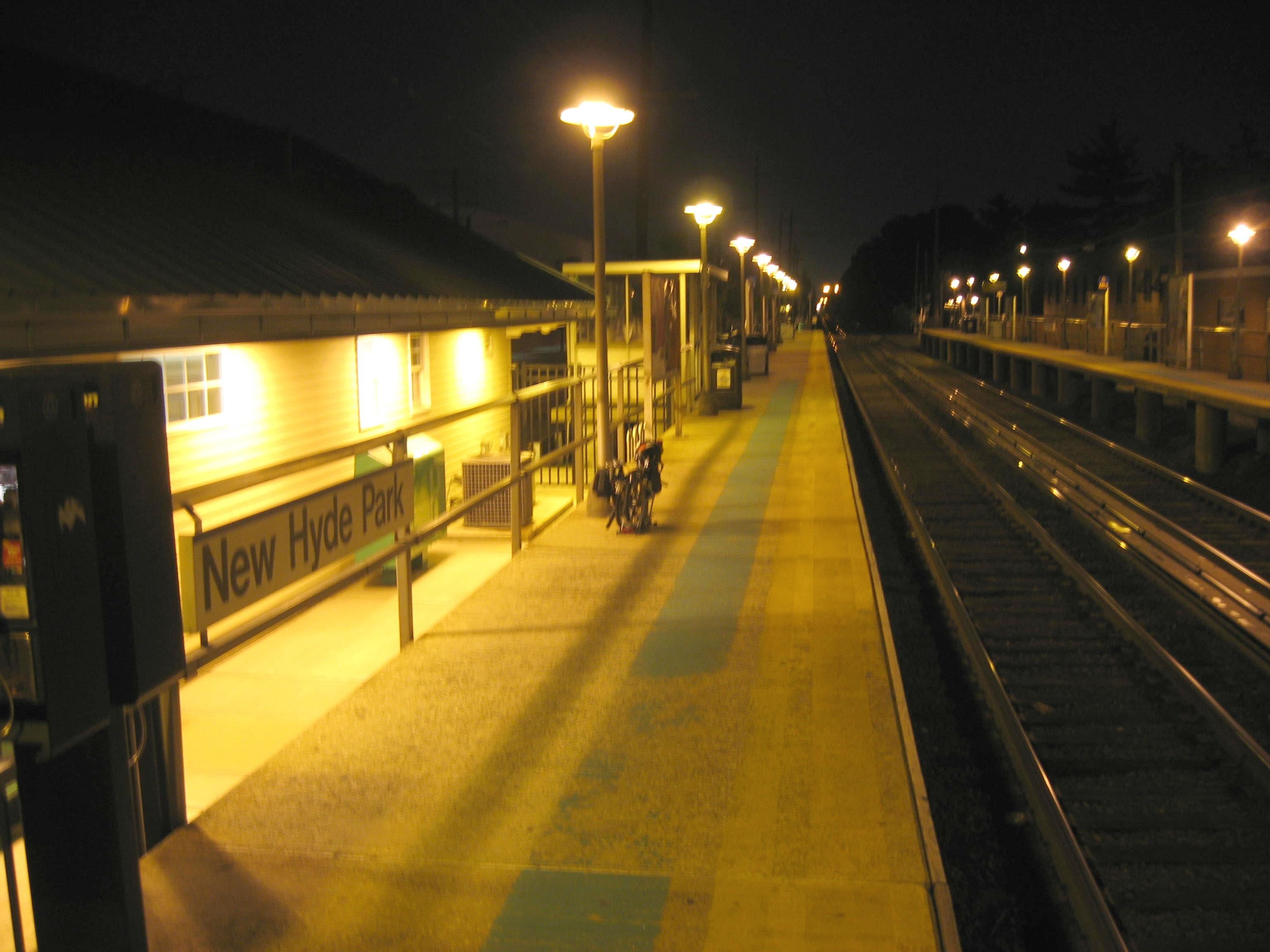
Central and eastern part

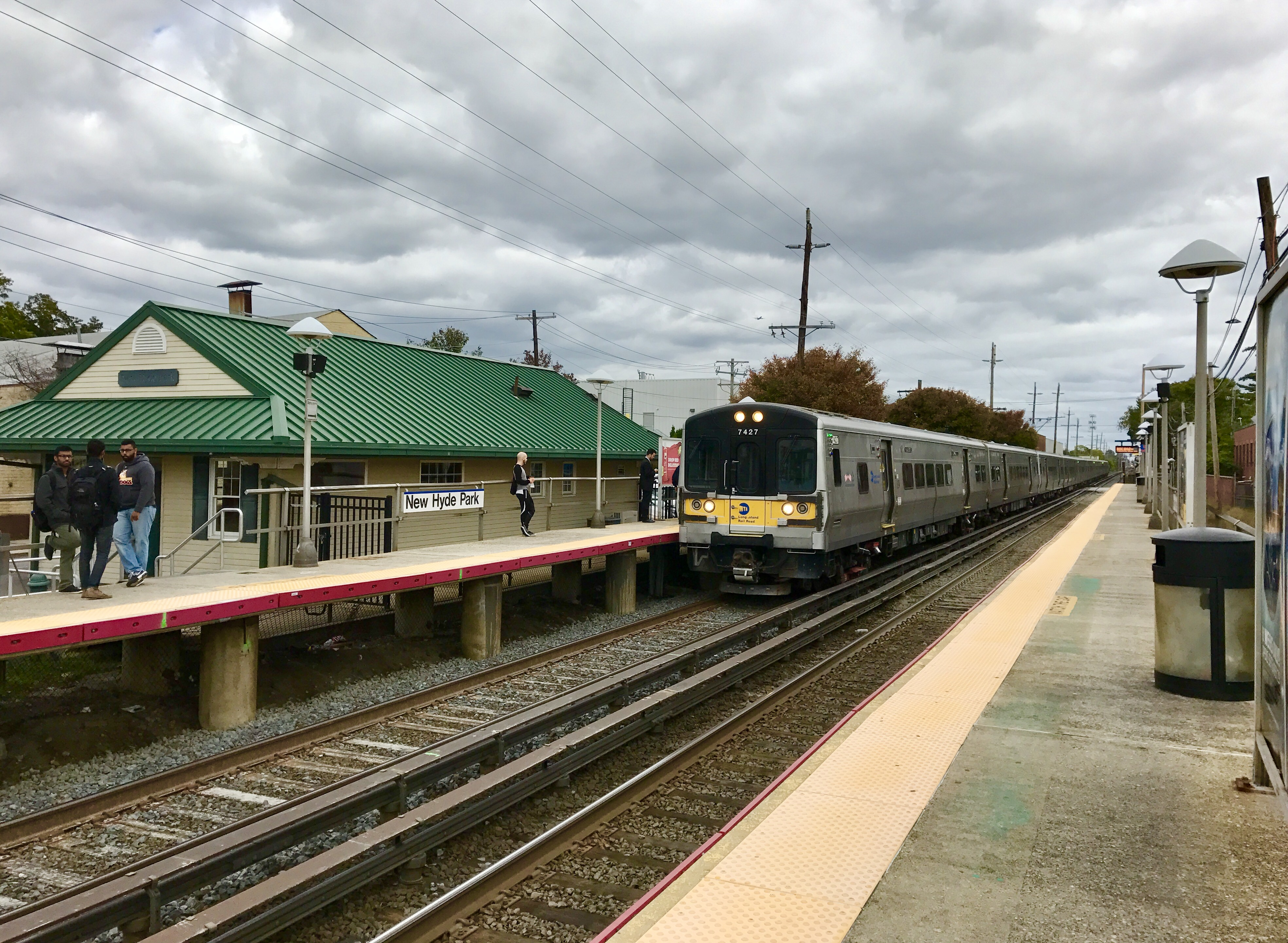
A train approaching the station, prior to its reconfiguration and modernization.

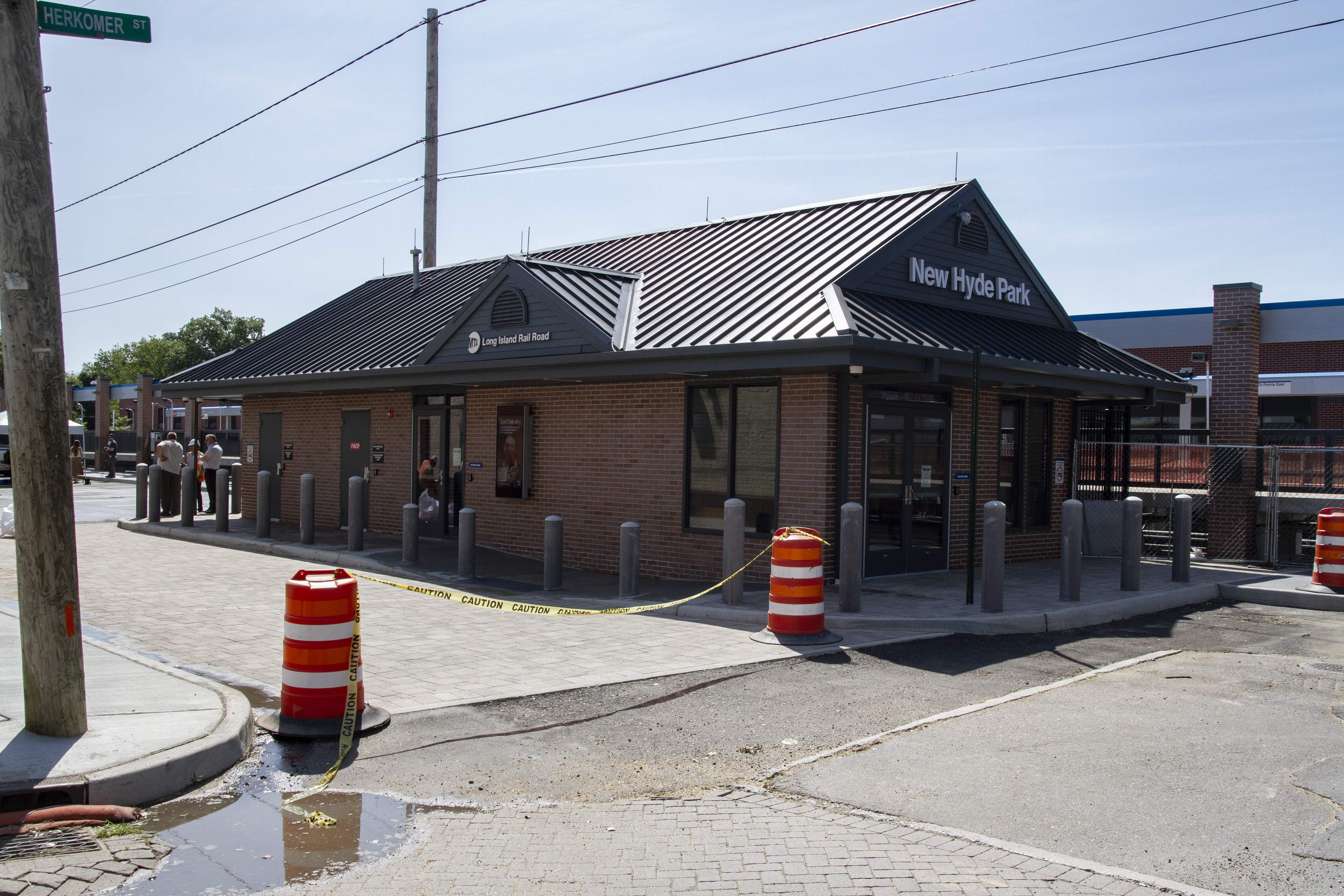
The station house.
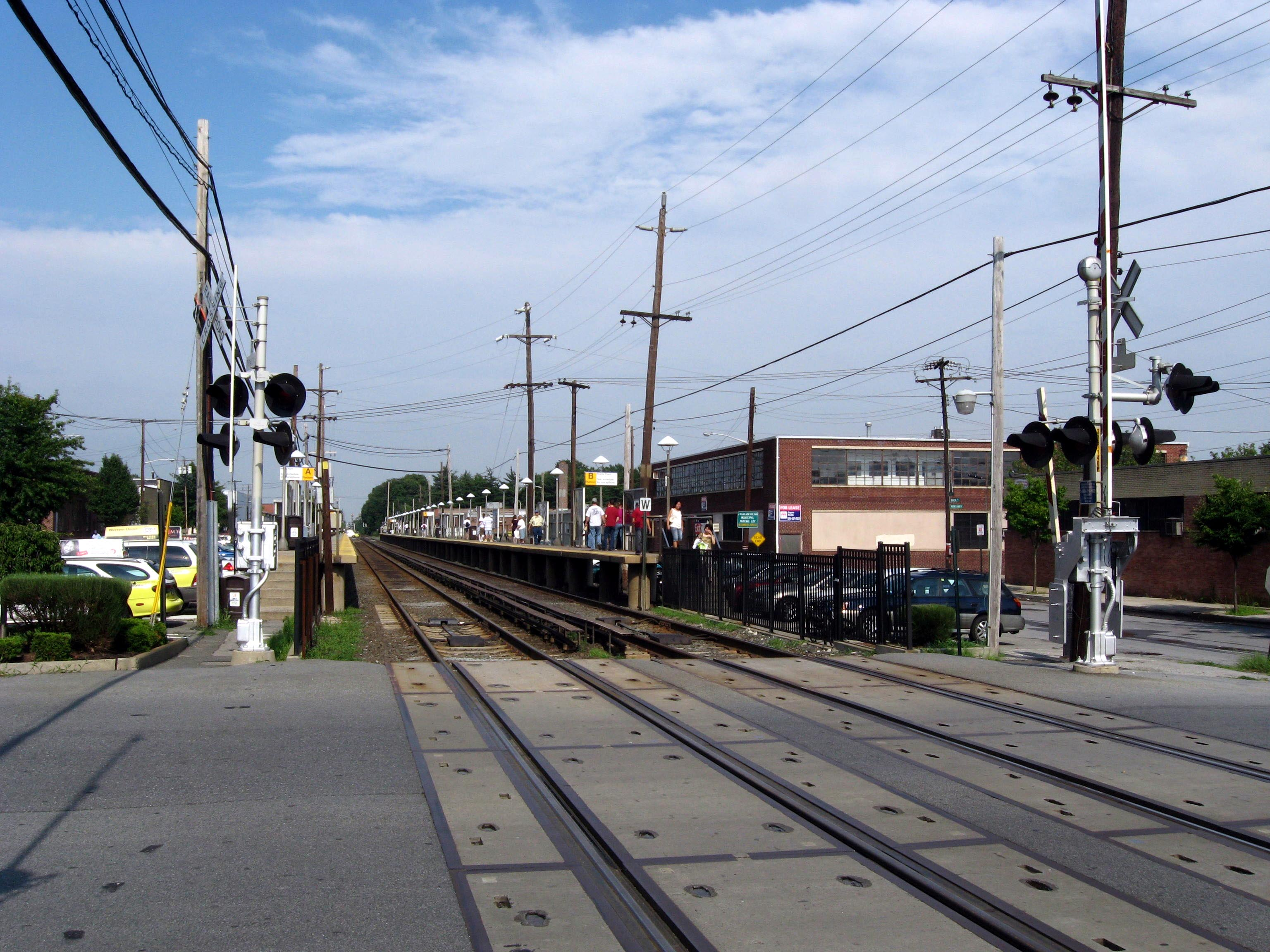
One of the grade crossings before replacement

One of the underpasses in 2022
