= Harold Interlocking =

Railroad junction in New York City

Coordinates: 40.7485°N 73.927°W

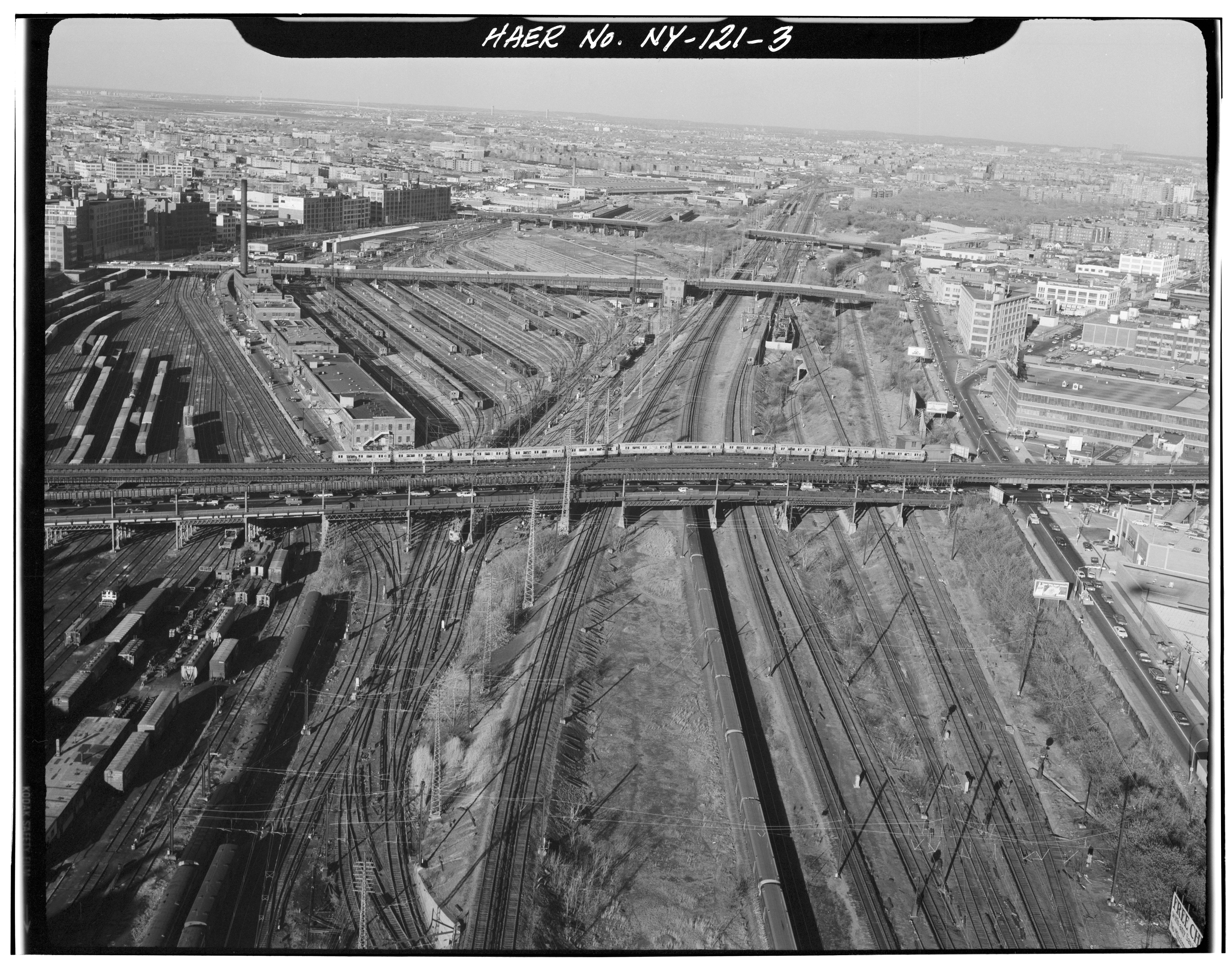
Harold Interlocking and Sunnyside Yard in 1977

Harold Interlocking is a large railroad junction in New York City. The busiest rail junction in the United States, it serves trains on Amtrak's Northeast Corridor and the Long Island Rail Road's Main Line and Port Washington Branch, which diverge at the junction.

Reconstruction work on Harold Interlocking started in 2009, as part of the East Side Access project to bring LIRR service to a new station under Grand Central Terminal. As part of the project, two tunnels for Northeast Corridor trains to bypass Harold Interlocking were built to reduce congestion and accidents.

== Location and operation ==
The junction sits in Queens, New York, east of the East River Tunnels and next to Amtrak's and NJ Transit Rail Operations' Sunnyside Yard. It sees 783 trains each weekday, including more than 40 per hour at peak periods. The interlocking serves Amtrak trains on the Northeast Corridor and the Long Island Rail Road (LIRR), whose Main Line and Port Washington Branch diverge from the Corridor here.

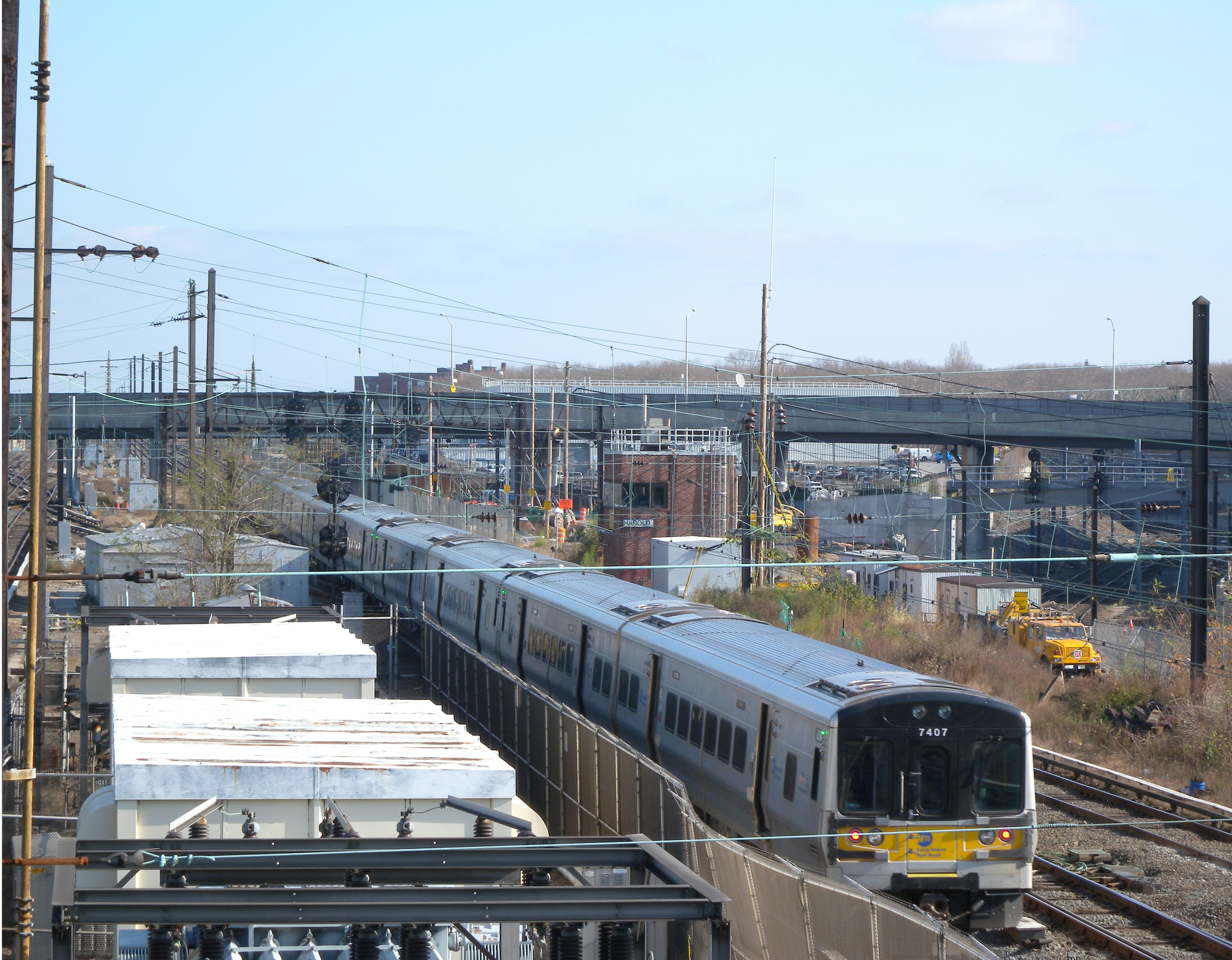
View from a nearby overpass

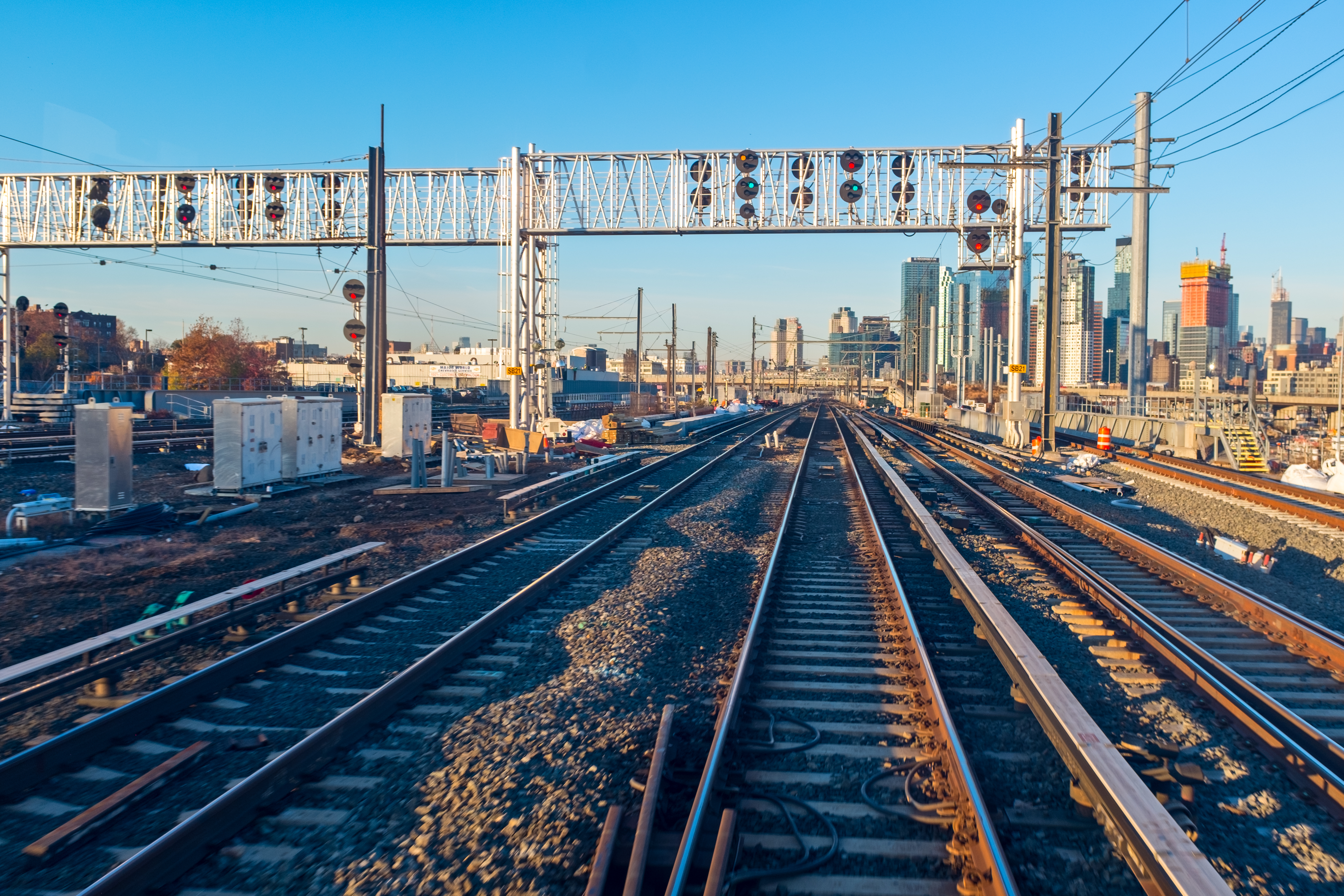
Entering the Harold Interlocking on the LIRR from the east

The complexity of the junction and the large volume of traffic have caused frequent delays and occasional accidents.

== History ==
The Pennsylvania Railroad built the Harold Interlocking in 1908 as part of the New York Tunnel Extension project, which built Pennsylvania Station, the North River Tunnels (under the Hudson River), the East River Tunnels and Sunnyside Yard.

A view of Harold Interlocking from the Ed Koch Queensboro Bridge exit ramp

The interlocking was renovated over a nine-week period in summer 1990, several months after a power surge caused trains to be stuck in the interlocking. Since the 1990s, Harold Interlocking has been controlled from a tower at Penn Station.

== East Side Access improvements ==
The Metropolitan Transportation Authority (MTA) began construction of several infrastructure improvements to the junction area in 2009, but a major project to redesign and rebuild the interlocking required additional funding.

In May 2011, a $294.7 million federal grant was awarded to address congestion at the interlocking. The work allowed for a grade-separated route between the East River Tunnels and the Hell Gate Bridge for Amtrak trains traveling to or from New England, thus avoiding LIRR traffic. Northeast Corridor trains from the Hell Gate Bridge and New England would be able to avoid the junction entirely, while trains to the Hell Gate Bridge and New England would be able to bypass a major section of the junction. The MTA undertook this effort as part of the adjacent East Side Access project to bring LIRR service to Grand Central Terminal. By November 2018, two of three East Side Access tunnel portals had been built at Harold Interlocking; the remaining portal was completed by early 2021. The full East Side Access project was completed on January 25, 2023, in line with the MTA's schedule estimates.

== Other improvements ==
Work on the Northeast Corridor bypass started in 2013. However, by October 2015, the tunnels were behind schedule because Amtrak and the MTA could not cooperate on track access schedules. These delays ultimately raised construction costs by almost $1 billion as of April 2018, and in a report that month, the MTA attributed the delays to a lack of cooperation on Amtrak's part. The work at Harold Interlocking also included the installation of a microprocessor-based interlocking logic, replacing the old relay-based one.

While some of the interlocking improvement projects are complete as of early 2023, several other projects are ongoing and will be complete by late 2025.
