= Yaphank–BNL station =

Long Island Rail Road station in Suffolk County, New York

Yaphank–BNL
- The station on opening day in 2026

General information
- Location: 201 Precision Drive; Shirley, NY 11967
- Coordinates: 40.849303°N 72.864516°W
- Owner: Long Island Rail Road
- Line: Main Line
- Tracks: 1

Construction
- Parking: Yes; Free
- Cycle facilities: Yes
- Accessible: Yes

Other information
- Station code: YPK
- Fare zone: 12

History
- Opened: July 17, 2026

Services
Preceding station	Long Island Rail Road	Following station
Medford toward Ronkonkoma	Ronkonkoma Branch Greenport Branch	Riverhead toward Greenport
Location

Yaphank–BNL is a station along the Main Line (Greenport Branch) of the Long Island Rail Road (LIRR) located in East Yaphank, New York. Opened in 2026, it is the newest LIRR station and serves the nearby Brookhaven National Laboratory.

The station replaced the former Yaphank station, which was located 3.5 mi (5.6 km) to the west.

== History ==
On January 10, 2017, Governor Andrew Cuomo, as part of his State of the State Address, announced a proposal to build a new LIRR station at Brookhaven National Laboratory for $20 million. The station is intended to serve the community of East Yaphank and Brookhaven National Laboratory. This proposal is intended to create jobs and stimulate economic growth in Suffolk County. As part of the April 2018 revision to the Metropolitan Transportation Authority's 2015–2019 Capital Program, the proposed station was renamed East Yaphank to better describe the station's potential location. The station would replace the stop at Yaphank, which was hard to find, according to local residents, and averaged 30 daily riders.

Before the Governor's announcement, on July 21, 2016, elected officials from Brookhaven and the East End of Long Island had requested that the LIRR move the little-used stop at Yaphank to an industrial park near Brookhaven Technology Center and the William Floyd Parkway. In response, LIRR officials announced that the agency had been evaluating the potential relocation of the station as part of its Network Strategy Study. County officials agreed on the new location, just east of the William Floyd Parkway, in 2021.

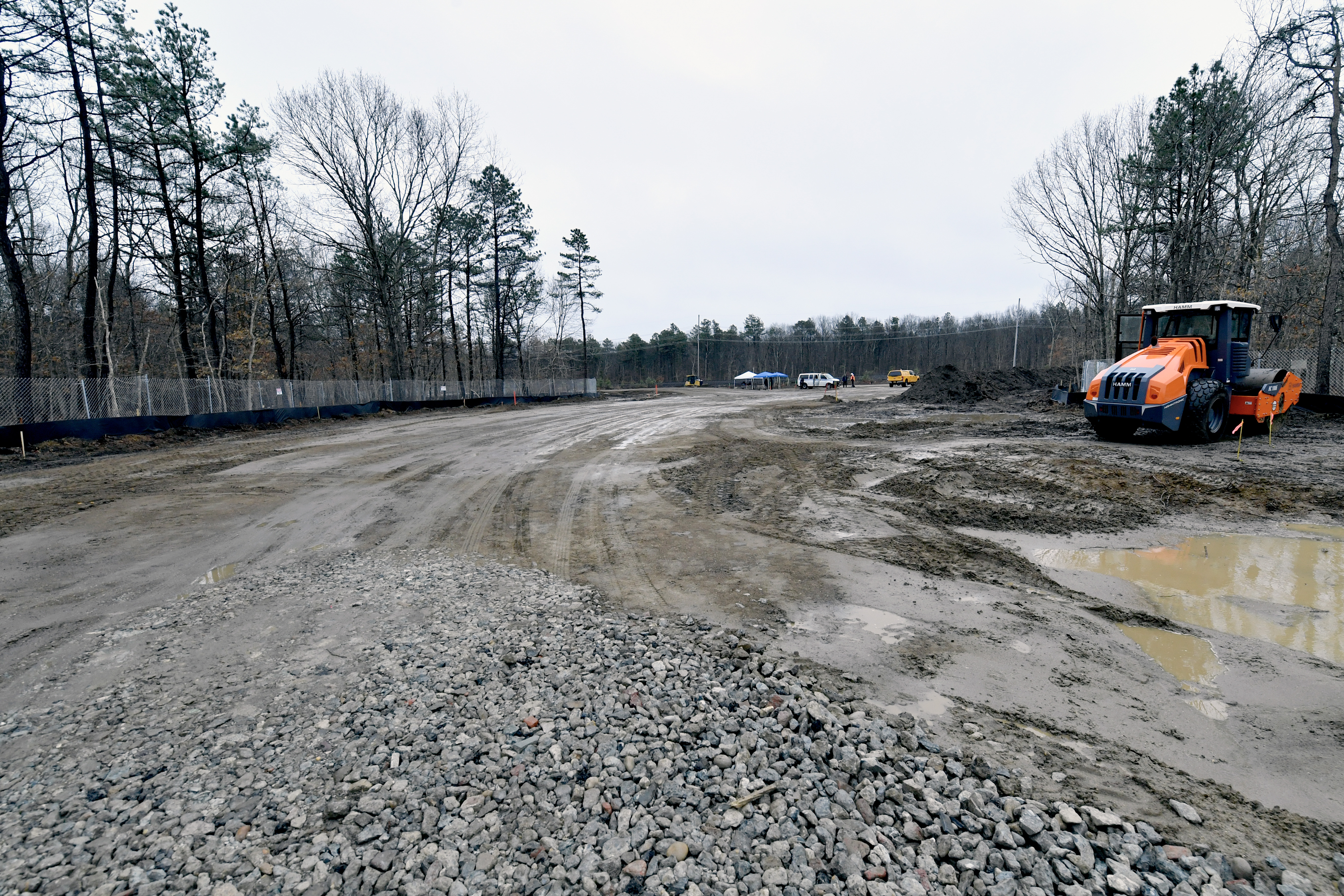
The station's location in April 2025

In December 2018, the consulting contract for the project's Preliminary Design and Environmental Review was awarded to Gannet Fleming for $4,040,289. The consultant would identify and evaluate potential station sites, and 30% of the design of the station, which could be in electric territory later on. The environmental review was scheduled to be completed in December 2019, with procurement on the design-build contract scheduled for 2020. The remainder of the $20 million would be used for the second phase of the project, which would be the design-build portion of the project – including the removal and demolition of the existing Yaphank station.

On January 31, 2024, bidding opened on procuring the station construction project. Brookhaven supervisor Dan Panico announced in January 2025 that work would begin shortly, and the Metropolitan Transportation Authority acquired land for the station. On April 3, 2025, officials broke ground on the new station.

At the time of the groundbreaking, officials announced that the new station would open in 2026. On May 11, 2026, the MTA clarified that the station would open May 15, 2026, and would now be known as Yaphank–BNL. However, the next day, the MTA announced the opening was postponed. The station finally opened on July 17, 2026 with full scheduled service commencing on July 18, 2026.

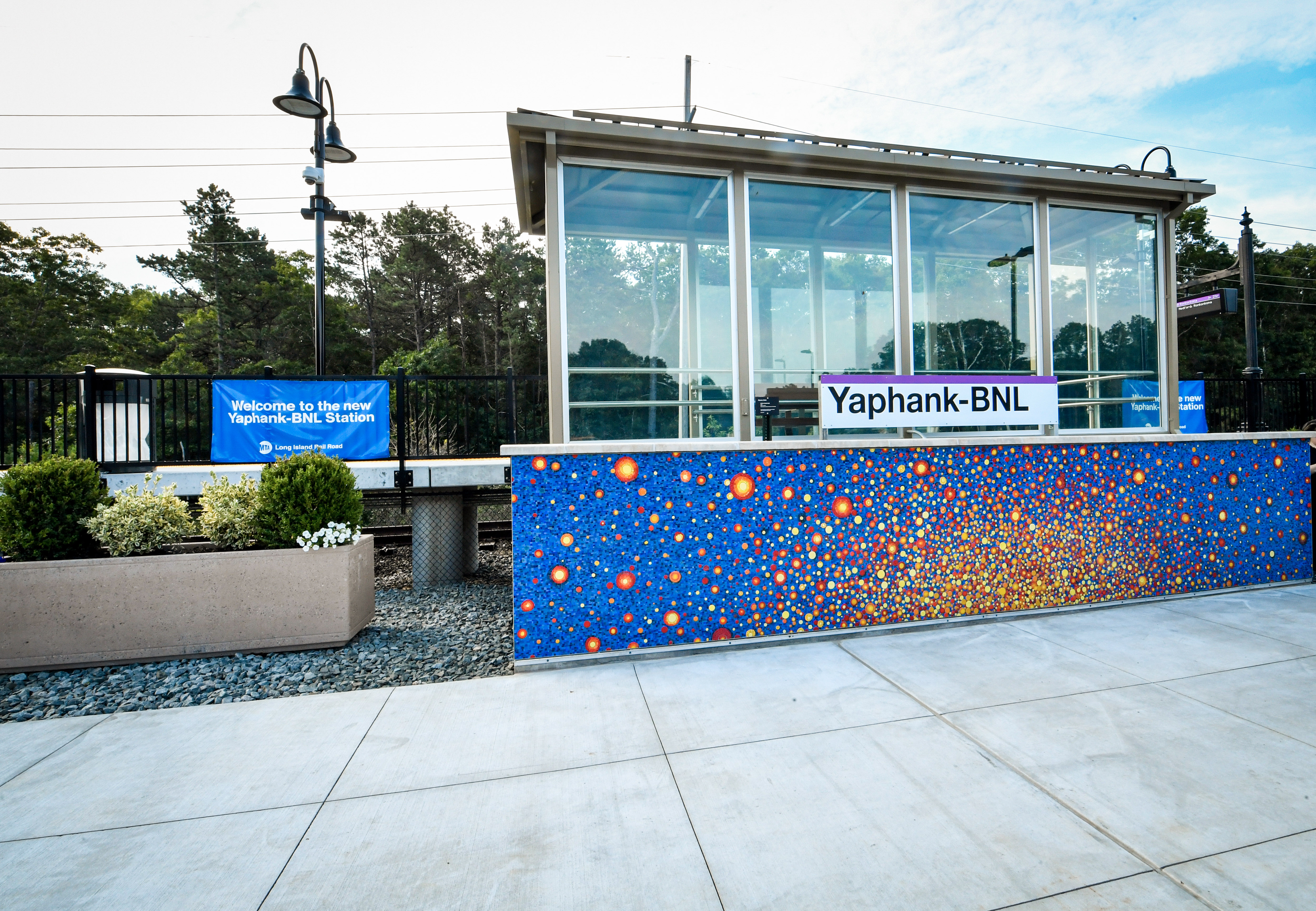
Opening of Yaphank-BNL station

== Station layout ==
The Yaphank–BNL station consists of one high-level side platform long enough for two cars to receive and discharge passengers. This new station also includes a paved, 50-car parking lot, a bus loop, a plaza, bicycle racks, and a sheltered waiting area on the platform.

== See also ==
- List of Long Island Rail Road stations
- History of the Long Island Rail Road
