= Westbridge station =

Train station in New York City (1888–1935)

Westbridge

General information
- Location: Jamaica Avenue; Richmond Hill, Queens, New York
- Coordinates: 40°42′5.8″N 73°49′19.2″W
- Owner: Long Island Rail Road
- Line: Main Line
- Platforms: 2 side platforms
- Tracks: 4

Other information
- Fare zone: 1

History
- Opened: 1916
- Closed: 1939
- Former names: High Bridge

Former services
Preceding station	Long Island Rail Road	Following station
Kew Gardens toward Long Island City or Penn Station	Main Line	Dunton toward Greenport
Location

Westbridge was a railroad station located on the Main Line of the Long Island Rail Road. It was located on the main line south of Jamaica Avenue.

== History ==
The station opened as a pair of sheltered sheds on June 28, 1916 and a ticket office at street level. The station's original name was High Bridge.

In 1916 there was a complaint by the Westbridge Civic Association to have one train in each direction to stop at Westbridge as they do at Forest Hills and Kew Gardens.

Westbridge was out of service on January 1, 1939 and was discontinued as a station stop. However, Westbridge last appeared in an employee timetable on September 18, 1938.

== Station layout ==
The station had four tracks and two side platforms. There are still remnants of this station; at the south end crossing of Jamaica Avenue you can see where the platforms used to be, the concrete footstones are still there and can be seen along the westbound side. Westbridge used to operate as a freight station after its closing. There is currently some old wood which lays alongside the outer edge of the roadbed which is most likely from the Wooden shelter that used to be on the platform. Some current maps and atlases still have Westbridge listed as a freight only station to this day; quite to the contrary that freight is no longer used here. While this station was open, one could see BMT trains on the BMT Jamaica Line overhead from the main line tracks when the trains ran to 168th Street.
