= East River Tunnels =

Tunnel under the East River in New York City

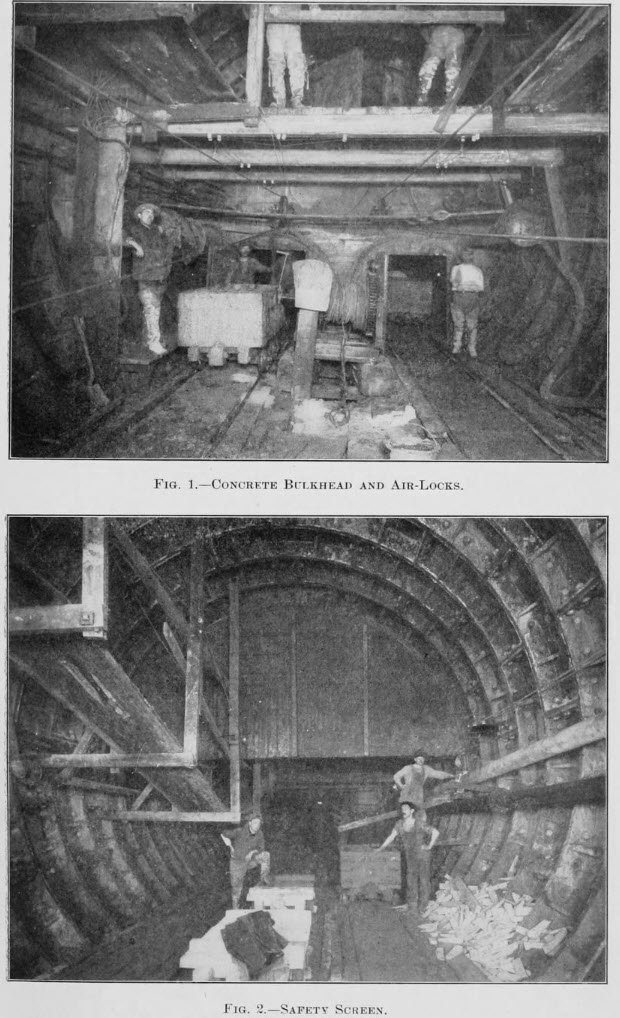
- Construction of the East River Tunnels, 1909

Overview
- Line: Northeast Corridor
- Location: East River between Manhattan and Queens in New York City

Operation
- Constructed: 1904–1909
- Opened: September 8, 1910
- Owner: Amtrak
- Traffic: Rail
- Character: Passenger

Technical
- Design engineer: Alfred Noble
- Length: 3,949 feet (1,204 m)
- Electrified: 600V DC (1910), 11,000 V 25 Hz AC (1917)
- Width: 23 feet (7.0 m)

Route map
- Location in New York City

The East River Tunnels are four single-track railroad passenger service tunnels that extend from the eastern end of Pennsylvania Station under 32nd and 33rd Streets in Manhattan and cross the East River to Long Island City in Queens. The tracks carry Long Island Rail Road (LIRR) and Amtrak trains travelling to and from Penn Station and points to the north and east. The tracks also carry New Jersey Transit trains deadheading to Sunnyside Yard. They are part of Amtrak's Northeast Corridor, used by trains traveling between New York City and New England via the Hell Gate Bridge.

== History ==
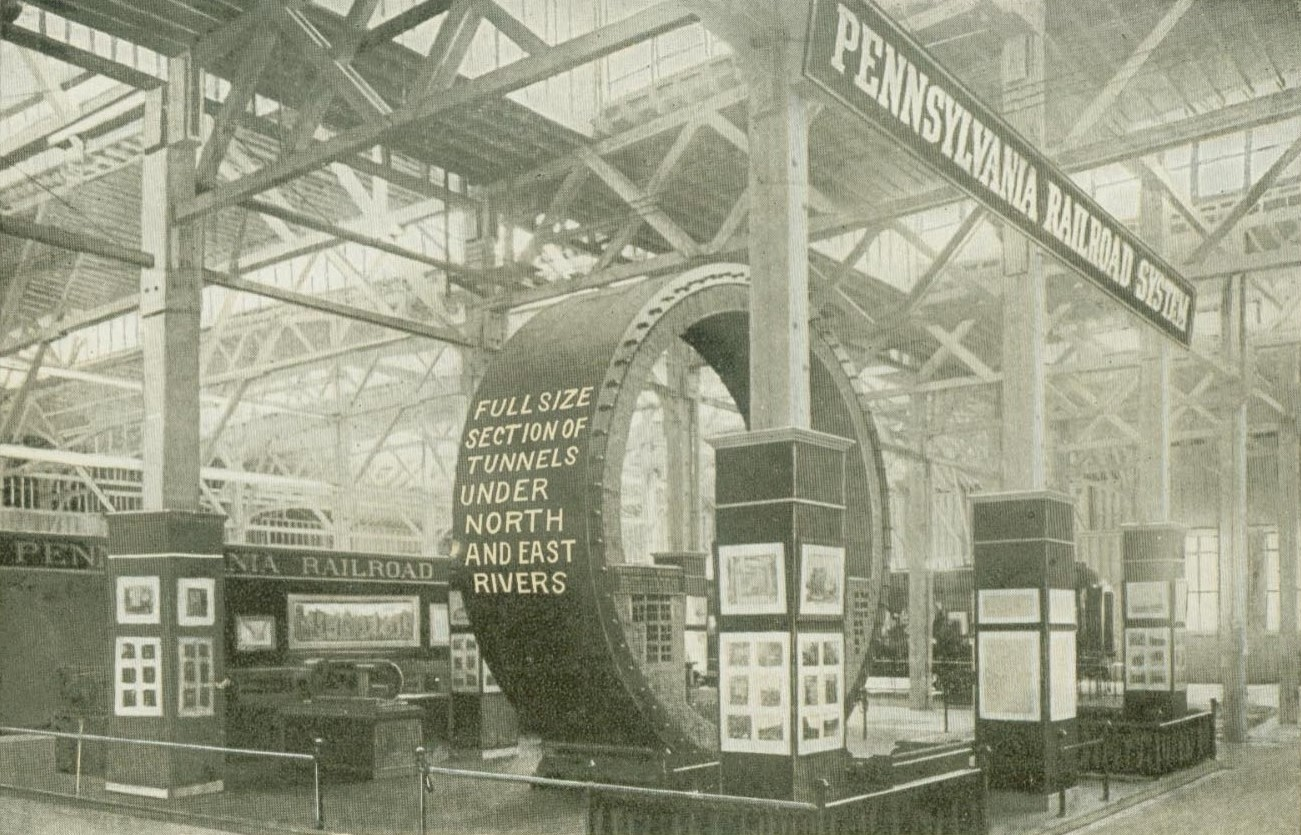
1907 exposition display showing cross-section of East and North River railroad tunnels

=== Construction ===
The tunnels were built in the first decade of the 20th century as part of the New York Tunnel Extension. The original plan for the extension which was published in June 1901, called for the construction of a bridge across the Hudson River between 45th and 50th Streets in Manhattan, as well as two closely spaced terminals for the LIRR and Pennsylvania Railroad (PRR). This would allow passengers to travel between Long Island and New Jersey without having to change trains; at the time, LIRR trains ran to Long Island City, where passengers took ferries across the East River to the 34th Street Ferry Terminal in Manhattan. As part of the extension, the LIRR became a subsidiary of the Pennsylvania Railroad. In December 1901, because of the high cost of building a bridge, the plans were modified so that the PRR would construct the North River Tunnels under the Hudson River.

The New York Tunnel Extension quickly gained opposition from the New York City Board of Rapid Transit Commissioners, who objected that they would not have jurisdiction over the new tunnels, as well as from the Interborough Rapid Transit Company, which saw the New York Tunnel Extension as a potential competitor to its as-yet-incomplete rapid transit service. The project was approved by the New York City Board of Aldermen in December 1902, on a 41–36 vote. The North and East River tunnels were to be built under the riverbed of their respective rivers. The PRR and LIRR lines would converge at New York Penn Station, an expansive Beaux-Arts edifice between 31st and 33rd Streets in Manhattan. The entire project was expected to cost over $100 million.

The contract for building the East River Tunnels was awarded to S. Pearson & Son in 1903. Originally, the tunnel would have comprised two tubes, but this was later expanded to four tubes. The project was led by Chief Engineer Alfred Noble.

Work began in 1904. The four tunnels were built simultaneously, digging east from Penn Station, west from Long Island City, and east and west from shafts just east of First Avenue. The tunnel technology was so innovative that in 1907 the PRR shipped an actual 23-foot (7.0 m) diameter section of the new East River Tunnels to the Jamestown Exposition in Norfolk, Virginia, to celebrate the 300th anniversary of the nearby founding of the colony at Jamestown. The same tube, with an inscription indicating that it had been displayed at the Exposition, was later installed under water and remains in use. Construction was completed on the East River tunnels on March 18, 1908.

=== Opening ===
The tubes opened along with Pennsylvania Station on September 8, 1910.

As part of the New York Connecting Railroad improvement project, a connection from the East River Tunnels to the New Haven Railroad tracks was also built. New Haven trains began running through the East River Tunnels, serving Penn Station, in 1917 after the Hell Gate Bridge opened.

=== Later years ===
The East River Tunnels were flooded with 14 million US gallons (53,000,000 L) of water during Hurricane Sandy in 2012. Even after the tunnels were drained, corrosion continued to occur inside the tunnels, and the signal systems broke down with increasing frequency compared to before the storm. Amtrak, which owns the tunnels, originally proposed to start repairing the tunnels in 2019 at a cost of $1 billion, with each tunnel being closed for two years. However, due to delays in the East Side Access project (which would give LIRR riders a second direct route into Manhattan via the 63rd Street Tunnel), Amtrak later pushed back the start date of the East River Tunnels' reconstruction to 2025, and increased the construction time to four years. In April 2023, Amtrak launched a request for qualifications for contractors to repair the tunnels.

Amtrak hired Skanska E-J ERT Joint Venture in July 2024 to repair the tunnels for about $1.6 billion. The next year, Amtrak proposed shuttering the two non-LIRR tubes, lines 1 and 2, entirely for more than a year. One tube at a time would be closed for 13 months each; the closure was to start on May 9, 2025, but was pushed back by two weeks. City and state officials asked Amtrak to close the affected tubes only during nights and weekends, stating that a 24/7 closure would reduce operational flexibility, but Amtrak rejected these plans. Construction work began on May 23, 2025. The first phase of the project to repair line 2 was completed on August 17, 2026; the second phase to repair line 1 will start in late 2026.

== Operation ==
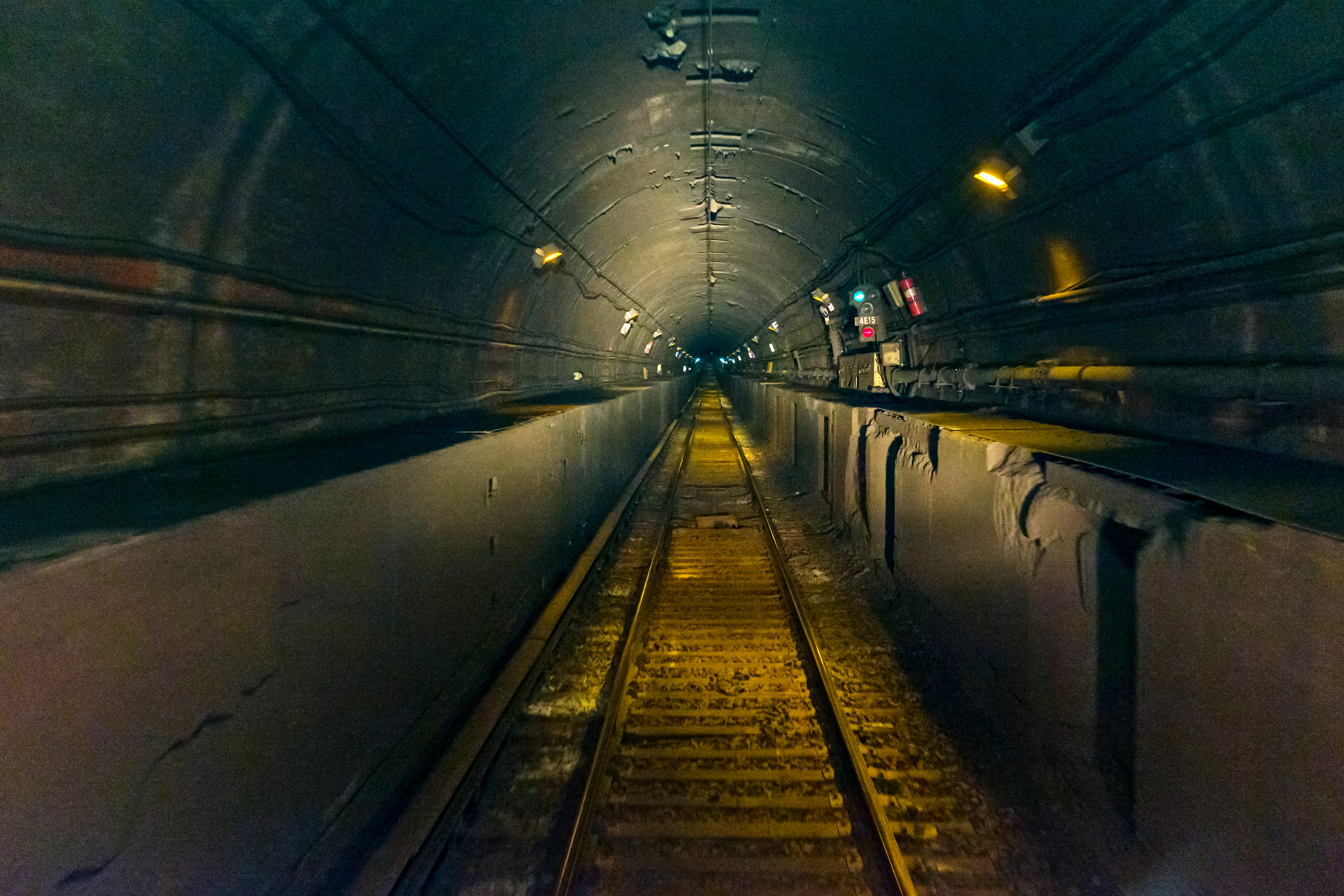
Tunnel#4 looking toward Penn Station, with both overhead wire and third rail visible

The East River Tunnels are owned by Amtrak and are electrified by both third rail and overhead catenary. Diesel-powered locomotives are not allowed in the tunnels except in emergency situations because of ventilation concerns, so the LIRR uses DM30AC dual-mode locomotives to power a few trains from non-electrified lines into and out of Penn Station during rush hours.

East of Penn Station, tracks 5–21 merge into two 3-track tunnels, which then merge into the East River Tunnels' four tracks. The tunnels end and the tracks rise to ground level east of the Queens shoreline. The four lines under the East River are numbered south to north, lines 1 and 2 running beneath 32nd Street and Lines 3 and 4 under 33rd Street. Eastward trains usually use lines 1 and 3, and westbound usually use lines 2 and 4. To bring the same-direction tunnels into adjacency, line 2 crosses beneath line 3 underground a few hundred feet west of the east end of the line 2 tunnel.

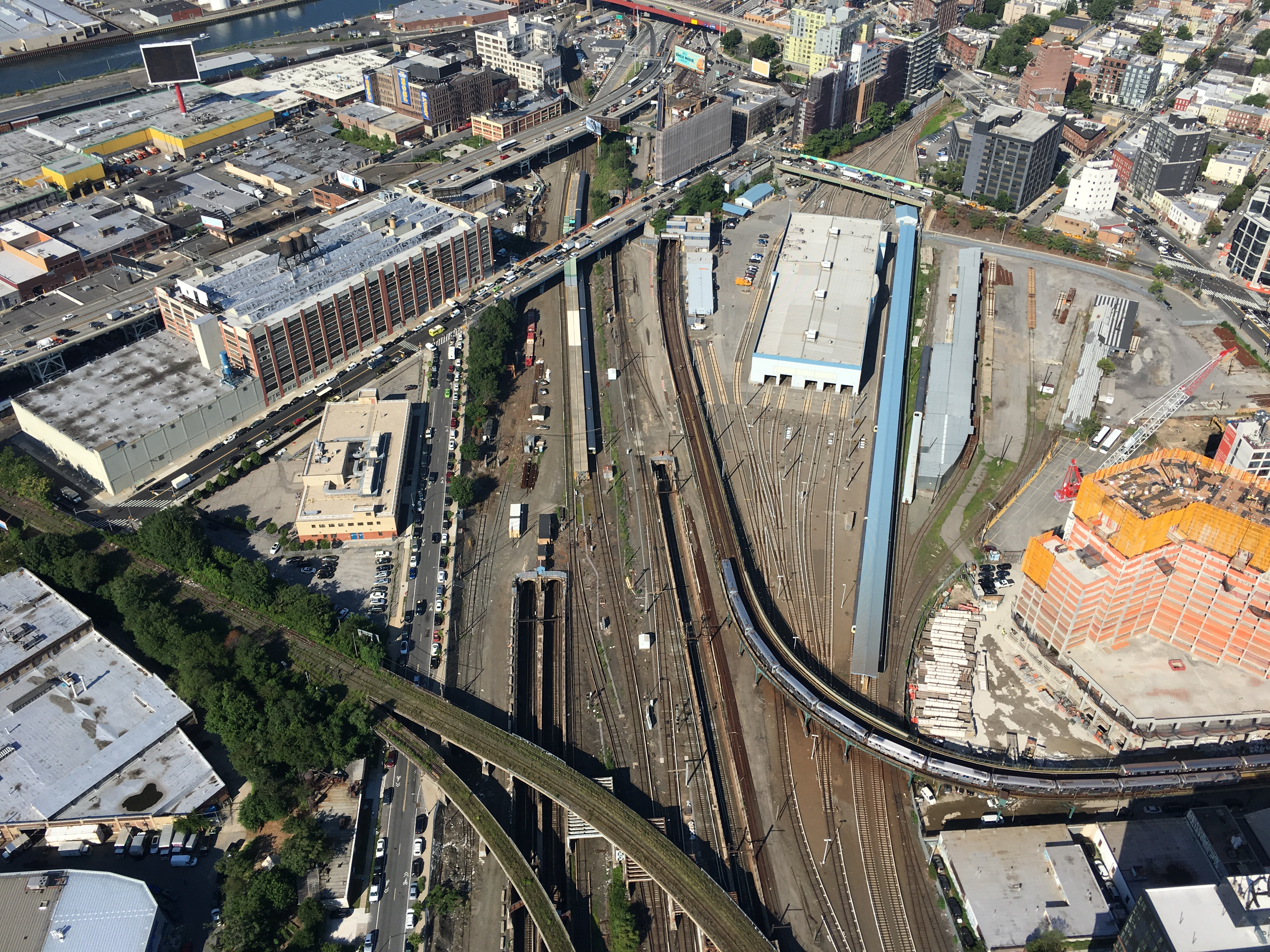
East River Tunnel portals in Queens

East portals for Lines 1 and 3: 40.7429°N 73.9450°W
East portal for Line 2: 40.7421°N 73.9483°W
East portal for Line 4: 40.74305°N 73.94585°W

Approaching Harold Interlocking from the west, the four tracks are Lines 1-3-2-4 south to north (with three LIRR tracks between Lines 2 and 3, and Sunnyside Yard approach tracks scattered between the passenger tracks). East of Harold, Lines 1-3 become LIRR Main Line Tracks 4-2 south to north, while Lines 2-4 become LIRR Main Line Track 3 and the westward Port Washington main. (Harold was rearranged in 1990; until then Lines 2-4 became the westward Port Washington and the westward Hell Gate track).

Amtrak's Superliner fleet cannot use the tunnels due to the inadequate clearances, so Amtrak instead uses Amfleet and Viewliner sets.

== See also ==
- North River Tunnels (Hudson River tunnels to New Jersey)
- New York Tunnel Extension (construction project for East River Tunnels)
