= Yaphank station =

Former train station in New York, US

Yaphank
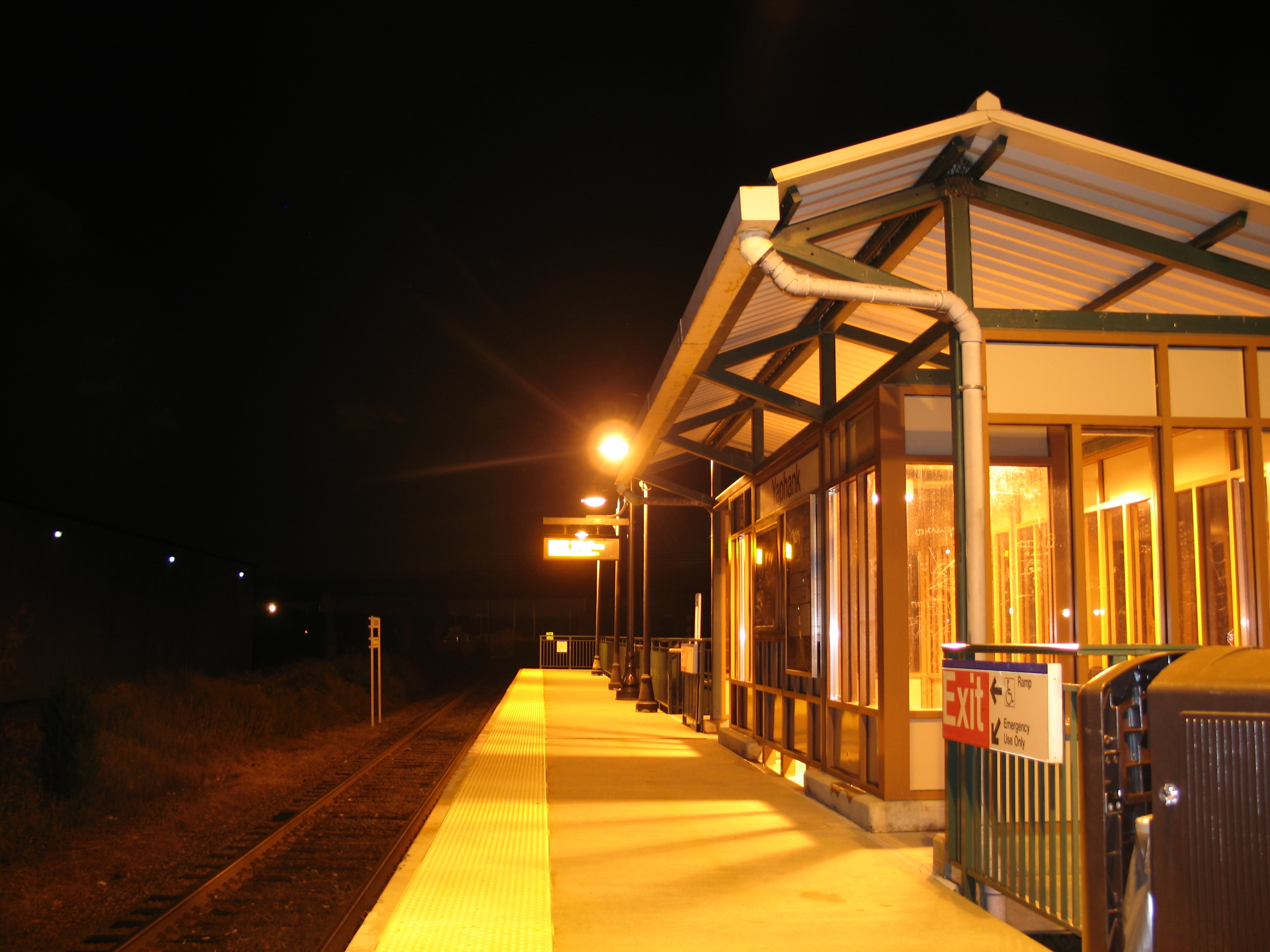
- The Yaphank station's platform at night in 2006, looking west

General information
- Location: Park Street; Yaphank, New York
- Coordinates: 40.825656°N 72.915841°W
- Owner: Long Island Rail Road
- Line: Main Line

Construction
- Parking: Yes; Free
- Accessible: Yes

Other information
- Station code: YPK
- Fare zone: 12

History
- Opened: 1845
- Closed: July 18, 2026
- Rebuilt: 1871
- Former names: Milleville (1845–1846)

Passengers
- 2012–2014: 30 per weekday

Former services
Preceding station	Long Island Rail Road	Following station
Medford toward Ronkonkoma	Ronkonkoma Branch Greenport Branch	Riverhead toward Greenport
Preceding station	Long Island Rail Road	Following station
Medford toward Long Island City or Penn Station	Main Line	Manorville toward Greenport
Location

Yaphank (originally known as Milleville) was a station in Yaphank, New York on the Main Line (Greenport Branch) of the Long Island Rail Road from 1845 to 2026. It was located on Park Street near Yaphank Avenue (CR 21). The distance between Yaphank and the next station, Riverhead, was the longest distance between stations on the LIRR, at 14.7 miles (23.7 km).

The station was replaced in 2026 by the new Yaphank–BNL station, located 3.5 mi (5.6 km) to the east.

== History and location ==
Yaphank station was originally built as Milleville station in 1845, and was spelled both as Millville or Milleville on LIRR timetables. It was renamed Yaphank a year later, and has kept that name ever since. The station also included a hotel until December 1873. Yaphank station was replaced by a second station building in 1875 that contained elaborate gingerbread woodwork. Before World War II, Yaphank station was known as the stop for the "Camp Siegfried Special," a train that took members of the German American Bund Nazi organization from parts of New York City to an infamous Hitler Youth camp known as Camp Siegfried. The decorative features were reduced considerably in June 1941, and then the station house was closed in 1958 and burned down in 1961. After this, it was little more than a sheltered platform surrounded by concrete. During the late 1970s, it became the stop for special trains with a connecting bus to Parr Meadows Racetrack. High-level platforms replaced this configuration in the late 1990s.

Government buildings are located on the north side of former station at the bottom of the Yaphank Avenue overpass. The two sites that were closest to the station are the Suffolk County Police Department auto mechanics shop (a.k.a. "Vector Center") as well as a Georgia-Pacific railroad lumber yard. The historic Suffolk County Almshouse Barn and the former Suffolk County Sanitorium can be found northwest of the station, as well as the Yaphank Avenue bridge over the tracks.

This was replaced by a new station in East Yaphank, New York, in 2026, to better serve the local community and nearby Brookhaven National Laboratory. A groundbreaking ceremony for the new station was held on April 3, 2025. Yaphank was planned to be closed and replaced by Yaphank–BNL station on May 15, 2026, though this was later postponed to July 18, 2026.

=== Carman's River station ===
Just east of Yaphank station, another station in Yaphank, Carman's River station, opened on June 26, 1844. It served as the temporary terminus of the LIRR main line until Manorville and Riverhead stations were built in 1845. The station was removed from the June 14, 1845 timetable.

== Station layout ==
This station had one high-level side platform north of the track that was long enough for one and a half cars to receive and discharge passengers.

== See also ==
- History of the Long Island Rail Road
- List of Long Island Rail Road stations
- Deer Park station
