= Locust Manor station =

Long Island Rail Road station in Queens, New York

Locust Manor
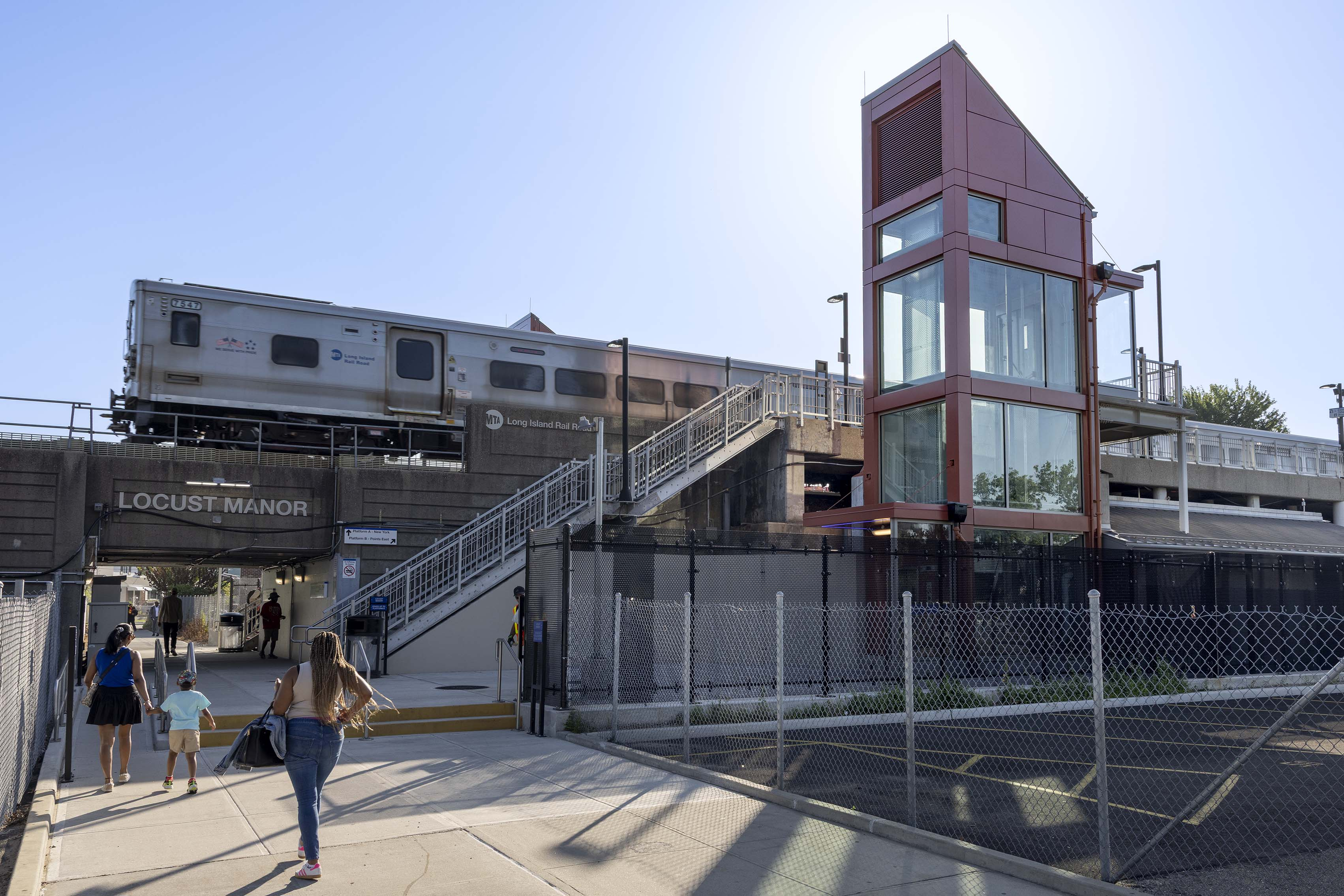
- The Locust Manor station in 2026

General information
- Location: Farmers Boulevard and Bedell Street; Locust Manor, Queens, New York
- Coordinates: 40.675022°N 73.764897°W
- Owner: Long Island Rail Road
- Line: Atlantic Branch
- Distance: 12.2 mi (19.6 km) from Atlantic Terminal
- Platforms: 2 side platforms
- Tracks: 2
- Connections: NYCT Bus: Q3, Q85, Q89; MTA Bus: QM21, QM65

Construction
- Parking: No
- Accessible: Yes

Other information
- Station code: LMR
- Fare zone: 3

History
- Opened: June 1869 (SSRRLI) c. 1876
- Closed: June 1876
- Rebuilt: 1876, 1959, 2018-19
- Electrified: October 16, 1905; 750 V (DC) third rail
- Former names: Locust Avenue (1867–1929)

Passengers
- 2012—2014: 1,389
- Rank: 64 of 125

Services
Preceding station	Long Island Rail Road	Following station
Jamaica toward Penn Station or Grand Central	Far Rockaway Branch weekdays	Laurelton toward Far Rockaway
Jamaica toward Penn Station or Grand Central	Long Beach Branch weekends	Laurelton toward Long Beach
Former services
Preceding station	Long Island Rail Road	Following station
Cedar Manor toward Flatbush Avenue	Atlantic Division	Higbie Avenue toward Valley Stream
Location

The Locust Manor station is a station on the Long Island Rail Road's Atlantic Branch in the Locust Manor neighborhood of Queens, New York City. The station is located at Farmers Boulevard and Bedell Street and is 14.0 miles (22.5 km) from Penn Station in Midtown Manhattan.

The stop serves the Rochdale and Locust Manor sections of Queens, along with its Rochdale Village cooperative apartment complex.

== History ==
=== Early years ===
The Locust Manor station first opened in 1869, and it was rebuilt in 1876. For many years, it served as the stop for the racecourse on which Rochdale Village was erected, known as the Jamaica Race Course.

=== 20th century ===
In February 1956, the Long Island Rail Road (LIRR) unsuccessfully petitioned the New York State Public Service Commission (PSC) for permission to close and remove the station if racing was transferred from Jamaica Race Course to Belmont Park due to low ridership. The station was used by 80 riders on weekdays, and by 30 riders on non-racing Saturdays. The LIRR suggested that riders use the Higbie Avenue station, instead.

On August 23, 1956, the PSC rejected plans to build a permanent railroad station alongside Jamaica Race Course, and approved a revised plan to close the Locust Manor station and a bridge at 120th Avenue, which would save $1,087,000. The PSC ruled that it was not justified for the LIRR to spend $847,000 on a new station in light of public knowledge about the closure of the racetrack in 1958. The PSC permitted the LIRR to construct temporary facilities instead. The LIRR's application was opposed by the counsel for the Mayor's Committee on Slum Removal, who stated that as soon as racing ended at the track in 1958 following the rebuilding of Belmont Racetrack, and the modernization of Aqueduct Racetrack, a builder would start work on the site.

On May 19, 1957, the PSC granted the LIRR permission to discontinue the Higbie Avenue and Locust Manor stations following the completion of a station between them at Farmers Boulevard. The new station would initially be accessed by a stairway at its southern end and by a pedestrian walkway at the northern end, which would be extended to Bedell Street after Jamaica Race Course was replaced by a housing project. The PSC also directed the LIRR to combine the project with its planned Old Southern–Rosedale grade crossing elimination project, and approved its $8,170,000 estimated cost. The new station included high-level platforms and Populuxe shelters for passengers. The reconstruction project was completed in 1959.

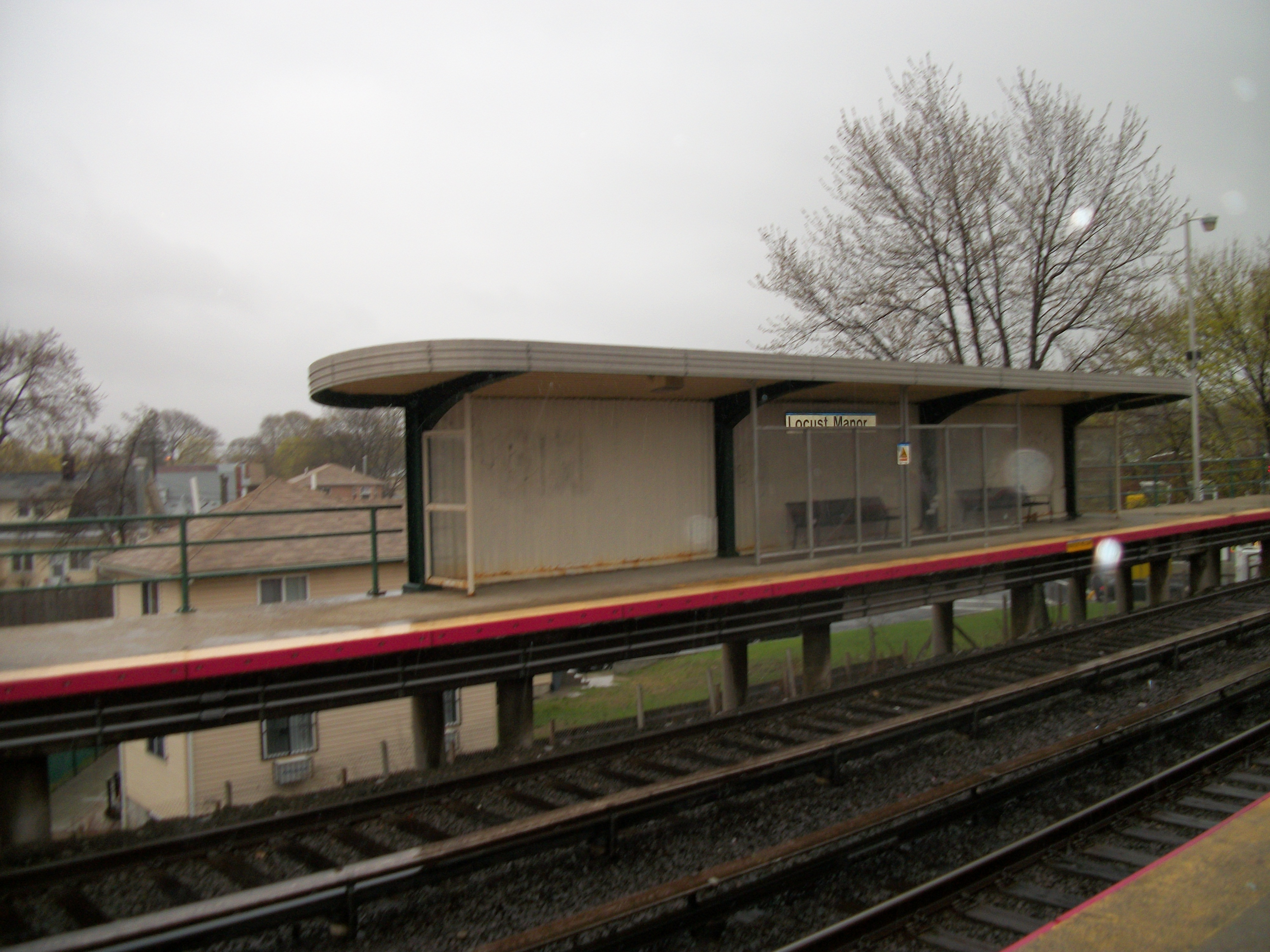
One of the station's former Populuxe-designed shelters, prior to replacement.

=== 21st century ===
The station underwent extensive renovations between 2018 and 2019, during which time it received upgraded features such as LED lighting and improved staircases. The project also saw a complete reconstruction of the pathway connecting the station with Bedell Street and 134th Avenue – including the addition of a pedestrian ramp, making the walkway ADA-accessible.

In March 2022, the Metropolitan Transportation Authority announced that it would be making the Locust Manor station and several other non-wheelchair-accessible stations in Queens compliant with the Americans with Disabilities Act of 1990, thus making the stations wheelchair-accessible. Elevators would be installed at the Locust Manor station to make it accessible. The MTA approved contracts for the elevators' construction in November 2022. The elevators opened in December 2025.

== Station layout ==
This station has two high-level side platforms, each eight cars long.

This station has two exits. One exit is on the northeast portion of the sprawling Rochdale Village housing co-operative. At that end of the station, the staircase leads to a walkway linking Bedell Street and residential 134th Avenue, in between two private Rochdale parking lots; both ends of the walkway are connected via a pedestrian underpass below the tracks. The southern exit leads to Farmers Boulevard, between Garrett Street and Bedell Street.

There are platform shelters near the exits. Ticket machines are located within the pedestrian tunnel on the north end of the station, at the base of the eastbound LIRR station staircase.

== See also ==
- List of Long Island Rail Road stations
- Brooklyn Manor station
- Rosedale station (LIRR)
- Springfield Gardens station
- Stewart Manor station
