= Locust Manor, Queens =

Neighborhood in New York City

Coordinates: 40°40′30″N 73°45′53″W

Locust Manor is a neighborhood in the New York City borough of Queens. It is bordered on the north by Baisley Boulevard to Irwin Place to Roe Road to 120th Avenue, on the east by the tracks of the Long Island Rail Road to 121st Avenue to Farmers Boulevard, on the south by North Conduit Boulevard, and on the west by Guy R. Brewer Boulevard to 137th Avenue to 173rd Street to 134th Road to Bedell Street. Nearby neighborhoods include Jamaica, South Jamaica, and Rochdale Village. Locust Manor, which was named after a 1906 residential development in the area, was formerly the location of the Jamaica Race Course, which operated from 1903 to 1959, and was torn down in 1960 in order to construct Rochdale Village.

Locust Manor is a "quiet residential neighborhood" which is home to a predominantly African American and Afro-Caribbean constituency of middle-class income. Locust Manor Estates, on 172nd Street and Baisley Boulevard, is a state-subsidized residential complex of two- and three-family homes, cooperative apartments and senior-living units, subsidized through the New York City Housing Partnership.

The neighborhood is served by the Locust Manor station on the Long Island Rail Road, located at Farmers Boulevard and Bedell Street, which offers service to Manhattan by both the Far Rockaway and Long Beach branches.
