= AirTrain JFK =

Airport people mover in New York City

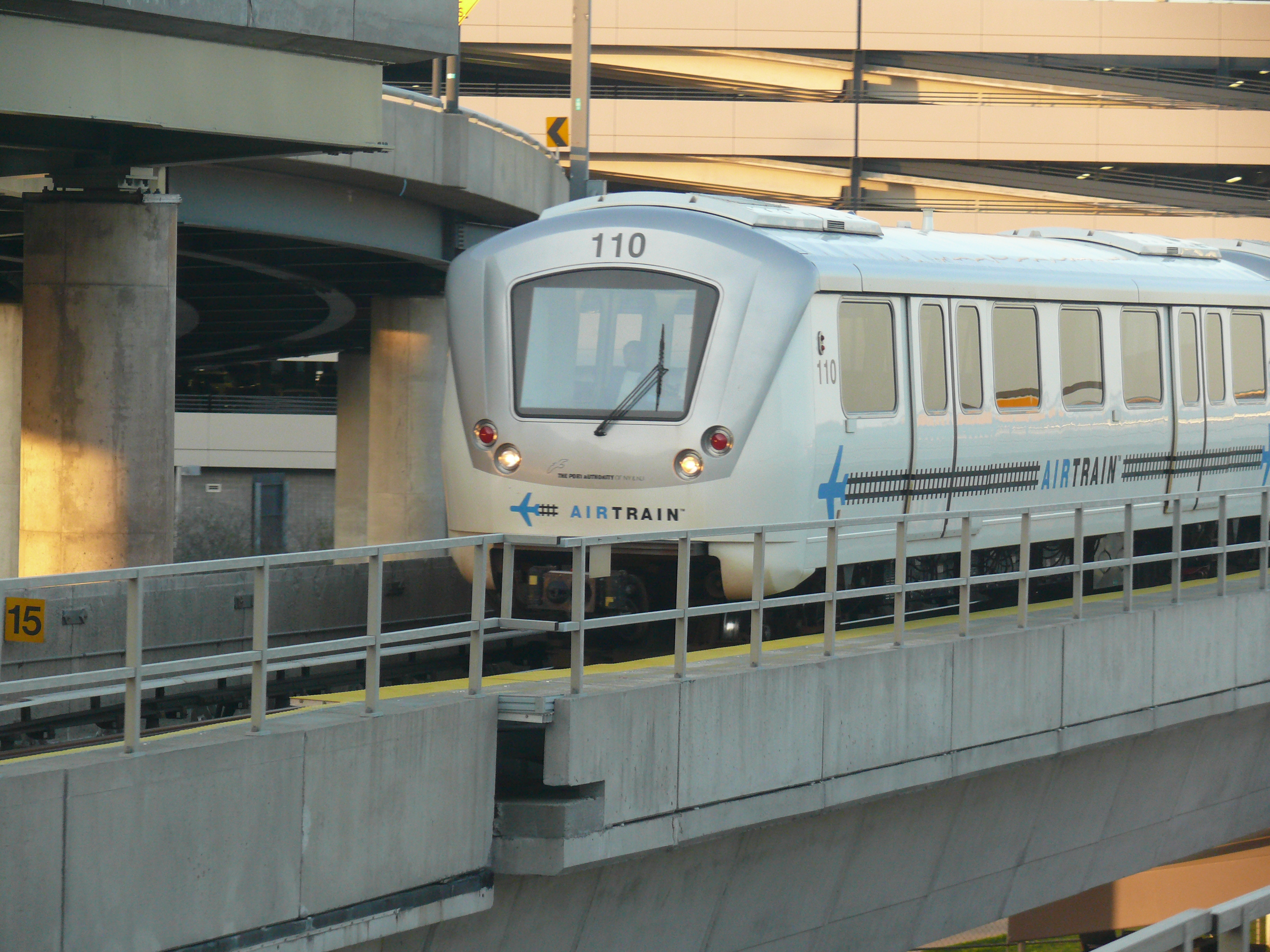
- The AirTrain JFK in 2012.

Overview
- Status: Operational
- Owner: Port Authority of New York and New Jersey
- Locale: Queens, New York, U.S.
- Termini: Jamaica Howard Beach; John F. Kennedy International Airport
- Stations: 9

Service
- Type: People mover, airport rail link
- Services: 3
- Operator: Alstom
- Rolling stock: 32 × Innovia Metro ART 200
- Daily ridership: 30,700 (weekdays, Q2 2026)
- Ridership: 11,658,100 (2025)

History
- Opened: December 17, 2003; 22 years ago

Technical
- Line length: 8.1 mi (13 km)
- Character: Elevated
- Track gauge: 4 ft 8 1/2 in (1,435 mm) standard gauge
- Electrification: Third rail, 750 V DC
- Operating speed: 60 mph (97 km/h)
Route map

AirTrain JFK is an 8.1-mile-long (13 km) elevated people mover system and airport rail link serving John F. Kennedy International Airport (JFK Airport) in New York City, New York, US. The driverless system operates 24/7 and consists of three lines and nine stations within the borough of Queens. It connects the airport's terminals with the New York City Subway at the Howard Beach station in the eponymous neighborhood, and with the Long Island Rail Road and the subway in the Jamaica neighborhood. Alstom operates AirTrain JFK under contract to the airport's operator, the Port Authority of New York and New Jersey.

A railroad link to JFK Airport had been proposed since the 1940s. Various plans to build such a link were put forth in the 1990s, though none were carried out due to a lack of funding. The JFK Express subway service and shuttle buses provided an unpopular transport system to and around JFK. In-depth planning for a dedicated transport system at JFK began in 1990 but was ultimately cut back from a direct rail link to an intra-borough people mover. Construction of the current people-mover system began in 1998. During construction, AirTrain JFK was the subject of several lawsuits, and an operator died during one of the system's test runs. The system opened on December 17, 2003, after many delays. Several improvements were proposed after the system's opening, including an unbuilt extension to Manhattan. AirTrain JFK originally had ten stations, but the Terminal 2 stop was closed in 2022.

All passengers entering or exiting at either Jamaica or Howard Beach must pay an $8.75 fare, while passengers traveling within the airport can ride for free. The system was originally projected to carry 4 million annual paying passengers and 8.4 million annual inter-terminal passengers. The AirTrain has consistently exceeded these projections since opening. In 2025, the system carried a total of 11,658,100 passengers, or about 30,700 per weekday as of the second quarter of 2026.

== History ==
=== Plan for direct rail connection ===
==== Early plans ====
The first proposal for a direct rail link to JFK Airport was made in the mid-1940s, when a rail line was proposed for the median of the Van Wyck Expressway, connecting Midtown Manhattan with the airport. New York City parks commissioner Robert Moses, at the time an influential urban planner in the New York City area, refused to consider the idea. In 1968, the Metropolitan Transportation Authority (MTA) suggested extending the Long Island Rail Road (LIRR) to the airport as part of the Program for Action, an ambitious transportation expansion program for the New York City area. Ultimately, the rail link was canceled altogether due to the New York City fiscal crisis of 1975. Another proposal, made by the Port Authority of New York and New Jersey in 1987, called for a rail line to connect all of JFK Airport's terminals with a new $500 million transportation center. The Port Authority withdrew its plans in 1990 after airlines objected that they could not fund the proposal.

In 1978, the MTA started operating the JFK Express, a premium-fare New York City Subway service that connected Midtown Manhattan to the Howard Beach–JFK Airport station. The route carried subway passengers to the Howard Beach station, where passengers would ride shuttle buses to the airport. The shuttle buses transported passengers between the different airport terminals within JFK's Central Terminal Area, as well as between Howard Beach and the terminals. The JFK Express service was unpopular with passengers because of its high cost, and because the buses often got stuck in traffic. The service was ultimately canceled in 1990.

==== 1990s plans ====
By the 1990s, there was demand for a direct link between Midtown Manhattan and JFK Airport, which are 15 miles (24 km) apart by road. At the time, the airport was only served by two highways: the Belt Parkway and Van Wyck Expressway. During rush hour, the travel time from JFK to Manhattan could average up to 80 minutes by bus; during off-peak hours, a New York City taxi could make that journey in 45 minutes, while a bus could cover the same distance in an hour. The Port Authority, foreseeing economic growth for the New York City area and increased air traffic at JFK, began planning for a direct rail link from the airport to Manhattan. In 1991, the Port Authority introduced a Passenger Facility Charge (PFC), a $3 tax on every passenger departing from JFK, which would provide $120 million annually.

In 1990, the MTA proposed a $1.6 billion rail link to LaGuardia and JFK airports, which would be funded jointly by federal, state, and city government agencies. The rail line was to begin in Midtown Manhattan, crossing the East River into Queens via the Queensboro Bridge. It would travel to LaGuardia Airport, then make two additional stops at Shea Stadium and Jamaica before proceeding to JFK. After the Port Authority found that the ridership demand might not justify the cost of the rail link, the MTA downgraded the project's priority. The proposal was supported by governor Mario Cuomo and Queens borough president Claire Shulman. The transport advocacy group Regional Plan Association (RPA) called the plan "misguided", and the East Side Coalition on Airport Access's executive director said, "We are going to end up with another ... uncompleted project in this city."

The Port Authority started reviewing blueprints for the JFK rail link in 1992. At the time, it was thought that the link could be partially open within six years. In 1994, the Port Authority set aside $40 million for engineering and marketing of the new line, and created an environmental impact statement (EIS). The project's budget had grown to $2.6 billion by that year. The EIS, conducted by the New York State Department of Transportation and the Federal Aviation Administration (FAA), found the plan to be feasible, though the project attracted opposition from area residents and advocacy groups.

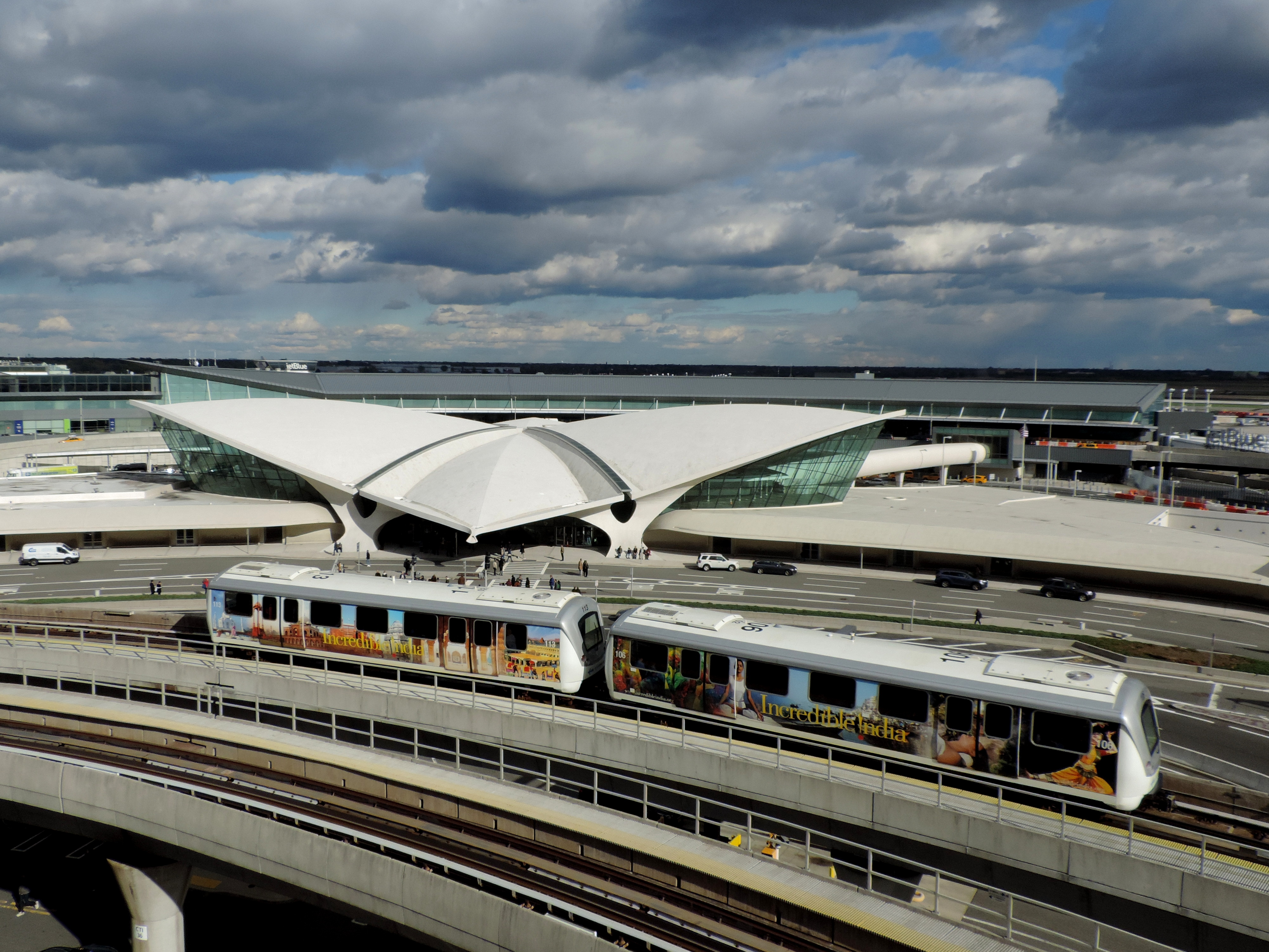
An AirTrain in front of the TWA Flight Center

The project was to start in 1996, but there were disputes over where the Manhattan terminal should be located. The Port Authority had suggested the heavily trafficked corner of Lexington Avenue and 59th Street, though many nearby residents opposed the Manhattan terminal outright. The Port Authority did not consider a connection to the more-highly used Grand Central Terminal or Penn Station because such a connection would have been too expensive and complicated. To pay for the project, the Port Authority would charge a one-way ticket price of between $9 and $12. By February 1995, the cost of the planned link had increased to over $3 billion in the previous year alone. As a result, the Port Authority considered abridging the rail link plan, seeking federal and state funding, partnering with private investors, or terminating the line at a Queens subway station. The following month, the administration of governor George Pataki directed the Port Authority to devise and finalize revised plans for the JFK rail link.

==== Curtailment of plan ====
The direct rail connection between Manhattan, LaGuardia Airport, and JFK Airport was canceled outright in mid-1995. The plan had failed to become popular politically, as it would have involved increasing road tolls and PATH train fares to pay for the new link. In addition, the 1990s economic recession meant that there was little chance that the Port Authority could fund the project's rising price. Following the cancellation, the planned connection to JFK Airport was downsized to a 7.5-mile (12.1 km) monorail or people mover, which would travel between Howard Beach and the JFK terminals. The Port Authority initially proposed building a $827 million monorail, similar to AirTrain Newark at Newark Airport, which would open the following year. In August 1995, the FAA approved the Port Authority's request to use the PFC funds for the monorail plan (the agency had already collected $114 million, and was planning to collect another $325 million). After the monorail was approved, the Port Authority hoped to begin construction in 1997 and open the line by 2002.

The Port Authority voted to proceed with the scaled-down system in May 1996, and it simultaneously set aside $25 million for planning and engineering. The FAA had already given the Port Authority permission to collect PFC funds for the Howard Beach branch and the terminal section, but not for the branch to Jamaica. The Port Authority's final environmental impact statement (FEIS) for the JFK people mover, released in 1997, examined eight possibilities. Ultimately, the Port Authority opted for a light rail system with the qualities of a people mover, tentatively called the JFK Light Rail System. It would replace the shuttle buses and run to Jamaica and Howard Beach. The FEIS determined that an automated system with frequent headways was the best design. Although there would not be a direct connection to Manhattan, the Port Authority estimated it would halve travel time between JFK and Midtown, with the journey between JFK and Penn Station taking one hour. The New York Times wrote that 21 prior recommendations for direct rail links to New York-area airports had been canceled in the preceding 30 years, while the Engineering News-Record said 22 such proposals had failed.

The people mover system was one of several major projects proposed at JFK Airport during the late 1990s. Pataki supported the revised people-mover plan, but New York City mayor Rudy Giuliani said the city would have to contribute $300 million, and that it was not a direct rail link from Manhattan, and thus would not be profitable because of the need to transfer from Jamaica. The Port Authority was originally planning to fund the project using $1.2 billion in PFC fees and $300 million in rental income. Giuliani wanted the Port Authority to study extending the Astoria elevated to LaGuardia Airport, as well as making the light rail system compatible with the subway or LIRR to allow possible future interoperability. By March 1997, five companies had expressed interest in building the system. The next month, Pataki agreed to provide $100 million to study a rail link to LaGuardia; in exchange, Giuliani and Shulman agreed to not oppose the JFK link. The Port Authority was reluctant to approve more than $5 million for the LaGuardia study.

Giuliani's continued opposition to the system delayed the project, and, if construction did not start by October, the project could lose $100 million worth of federal funds. Giuliani agreed to the plan in October 1997, when the state agreed to reimburse the city for its share of the system's cost. As part of the agreement, the state would also conduct a study on a similar train link to LaGuardia Airport. By that time, the Port Authority had collected $441 million in PFC funds. An artist's impression of the proposed people mover was presented to residents of southern Queens that November. Public reception was mixed. One civic leader in Jamaica was optimistic that the people mover would spur development in that neighborhood, and other supporters said it would benefit business and alleviate Van Wyck Expressway traffic in the long run. On the other hand, two community boards and several civic groups claimed the people mover would worsen traffic, and local newspaper Newsday criticized the proposal as being ineffective without a direct link to Manhattan, citing the failure of the JFK Express.

=== Construction ===
==== Approval and groundbreaking ====
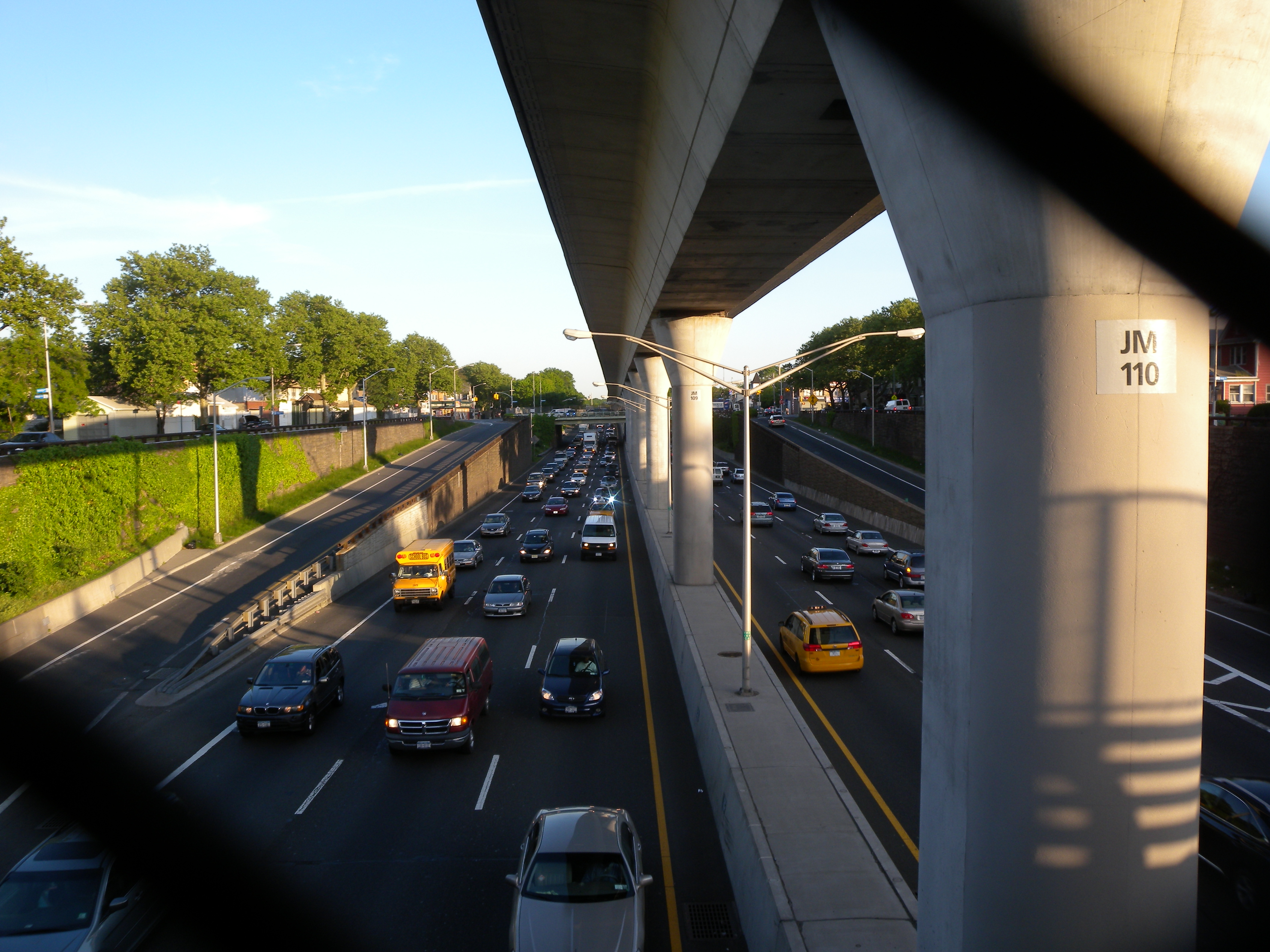
AirTrain viaduct over the Van Wyck Expressway

The Port Authority could use the funds from the Passenger Facility Charge only to make improvements that exclusively benefited airport passengers. As a result, only the sections linking Jamaica and Howard Beach to JFK Airport were approved and built, since it was expected that airport travelers would be the sole users of the system. The federal government approved the use of PFC funds for the new light rail system in February 1998. The PFC funds could not be used for as much as $200 million of the cost because, according to the FAA, the tax funds could not be used to pay for additional costs such as storage, maintenance, operation, and fare collection expenses. The Air Transportation Association of America (ATA), which argued that PFC funds could only be used for projects within the airport itself, sued the FAA the next month, saying the light rail project was using the funds illegally.

The Port Authority awarded a $930 million design–build–operate–maintain contract in April 1998 to AirRail Transit Consortium, a group composed of Slattery Skanska, Bombardier Transportation, STV Inc., Perini Corporation, and numerous consultants. Giuliani, who did not want the city to pay the project's $200 million cost difference, said he would not allow construction to begin unless the funding dispute was resolved. Construction of the system ultimately began in May 1998, and an official groundbreaking took place on September 16, 1998. By the beginning of 1999, the system was known as the AirTrain.

The route was to run mostly along existing rights-of-way, but three commercial properties were seized and demolished to make way for the route. Members of the New York City Planning Commission approved the condemnation of several buildings along the route in May 1999 but voiced concerns about the projected high price of the tickets, ridership demand, and unwieldy transfers at Jamaica. Before major construction could begin, the New York City Council had to vote on whether to approve the project, and the AirTrain's supporters and opponents both lobbied the City Council heavily. Although City Council speaker Peter Vallone was publicly neutral on the project, his own office had published a study in early 1999, which criticized the AirTrain's lack of direct access to Manhattan and predicted that it would be of little help to the local economy. To attract local support, the Port Authority offered to pay for other projects in surrounding neighborhoods, such as a waterfront park. The council approved the AirTrain that June on a 47–3 vote, even though many council members also had reservations about the AirTrain.

==== Early construction ====
Most of the system was built one span at a time, using cranes mounted on temporary structures that erected new spans as they progressed linearly along the structures. Several sections were built using a balanced cantilever design, where two separate spans were connected to each other using the span-by-span method. The Jamaica branch's location above the median of the busy Van Wyck Expressway, combined with the varying length and curves of the track spans, caused complications during construction. One lane of the Van Wyck had to be closed in each direction during off-peak hours, causing congestion. The Port Authority also installed new sidewalks, plantings, and fences along the Van Wyck. By the end of 1999, the columns in the Van Wyck's median were being erected, and half of the viaduct spans had been built, although only fifteen percent of the system was finished at the time.

The project also included $80 million of tunnels within the airport, which was built using a cut-and-cover method; the tunnels had been among the first contracts to be awarded. Two shifts of workers excavated a trench measuring 25 feet (7.6 m) deep, 100 feet (30 m) wide, and 1,000 feet (300 m) long. The water table was as shallow as 5 feet (1.5 m) beneath the surface, so contractors pumped water out of the trench during construction. For waterproofing, subcontractor Trevi-Icos Inc. poured a U-shaped layer of grout, measuring 80 feet (24 m) wide and between 50 and 90 feet (15 and 27 m) deep.

==== Reception, opposition, and complaints ====
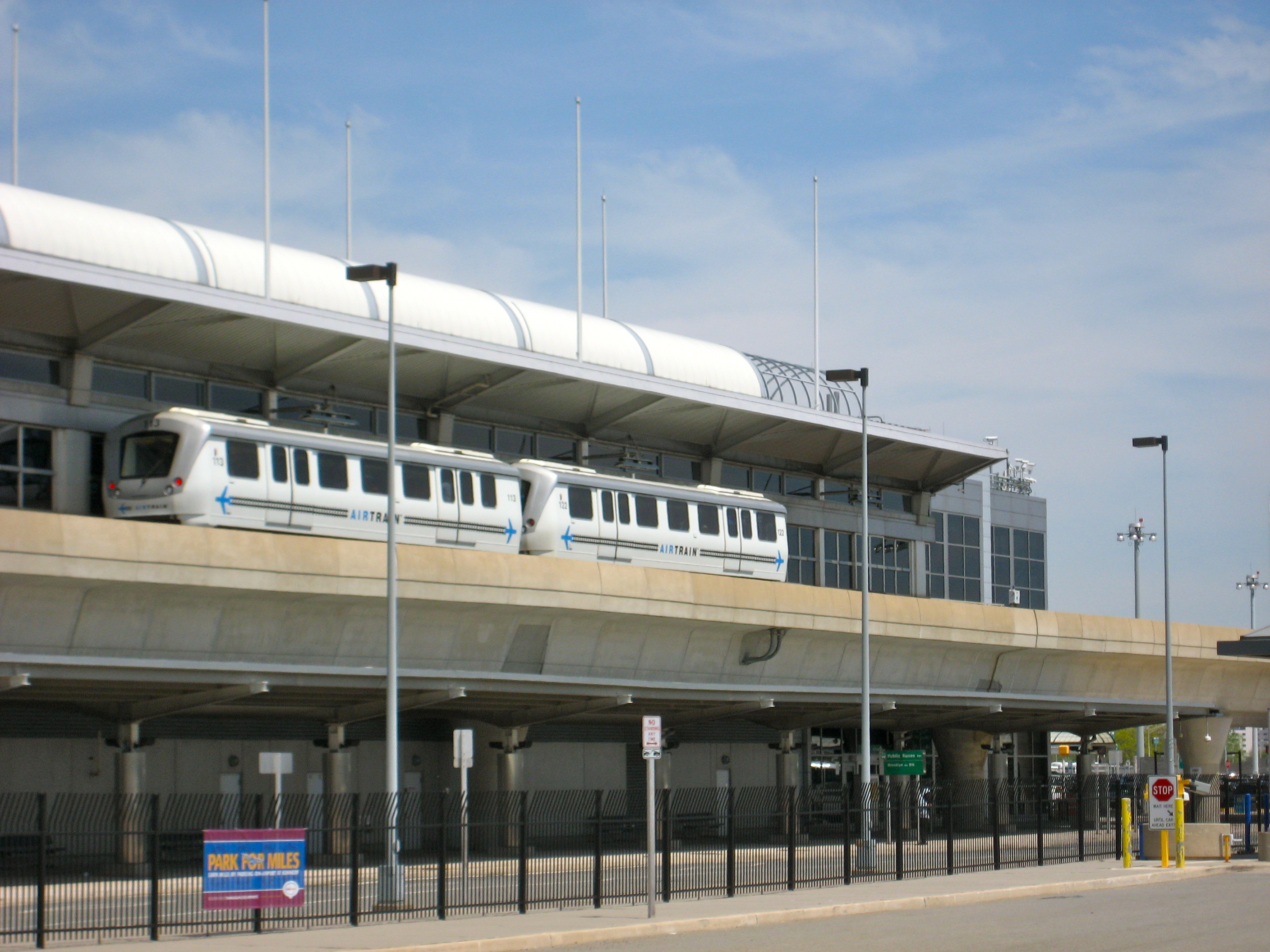
The Lefferts Boulevard station

The project was controversial from the outset: although several local politicians, community leaders, and the politically powerful construction industry supported the AirTrain, it faced opposition from the ATA and local residents. Community leaders supported the project because of its connections to the Jamaica and Howard Beach stations. Proponents, including retired U.S. congressman Floyd Flake and the Greater Jamaica Development Corporation, claimed the system would attract businesses to downtown Jamaica and create jobs. Queens community boards 10, 12, and 13 cast advisory votes in support of the project.

Almost all civic groups along the Jamaica branch's route opposed it due to concerns about nuisance, noise, and traffic. Opponents claimed that the system had not undergone the Uniform Land Use Review Procedure process, and more than 90 local organizations wanted the FAA to allow the public to discuss the PFC charges. Residents of Briarwood, a neighborhood that was not even near the AirTrain, also opposed the project because they feared the Jamaica branch would be extended to LaGuardia. There were multiple protests against the project, such as in 2000, when a crane caught fire in a suspected arson. Homeowners believed the concrete viaducts would lower the value of their houses, and some residents reported that vibrations from construction had caused their homes to shake and crack. Residents were also concerned about the noise that an elevated structure would create; according to a 2012 study, the majority of residents' complaints were due to "nuisance violations".

In light of the ATA's 1998 lawsuit, the Port Authority threatened to halt the development of a new terminal for American Airlines (one of the ATA's primary members) at JFK Airport unless American dropped its opposition to the system. The ATA filed a federal lawsuit in January 1999, alleging misuse of PFC funds. In March, a federal judge vacated the project's approval because the FAA had collected and perused public comments after the public-comment deadline, but found that the PFC funds had not been misused. Additionally, the judge found that the Port Authority and FAA had shut the ATA out of discussions. The FAA opened a second request for public comment and approved the project for the second time in August 1999. The ATA and two local advocacy groups appealed the funding decision in late 1999. The advocacy groups filed a second federal lawsuit in 2000, claiming that the FEIS had included misleading statements about the effects of the elevated structure on southern Queens neighborhoods. The ATA withdrew from the lawsuit, but one of the advocacy groups proceeded with the appeal and lost.

The Port Authority also hired a community liaison in 1998 to address local residents' concerns. During the next two years, the liaison received 400 calls seeking damages or complaining about vibrations and construction. In response to complaints, the Port Authority imposed strict rules regarding disruptive or loud construction activity, as well as implementing a streamlined damage claim process to compensate homeowners. Through 2002, there were 550 nuisance complaints over the AirTrain's construction, of which 98 percent had been resolved by April of that year. By contrast, Queens Community District 12—which includes the neighborhood of South Jamaica, along the AirTrain's route—recorded few complaints about the construction process.

==== Testing, delays, and completion ====
A website for the project was launched in April 2000. Pile-driving for elevated columns was nearly completed in late 2000, when two-thirds of the system's columns had been installed. The United States Congress provided almost $2 million in November 2000 for wayfinding, marketing, and access projects and a study related to the AirTrain. The system was ready for its first test trains by the end of the year, and two AirTrain cars were delivered and tested after the system's guideway rails were complete by March 2001. By then, workers had completed 140 columns for the guideways in the Van Wyck Expressway's median. The guideways themselves were completed that August. Although the Port Authority had planned to award 17% of contracts for the first phase of AirTrain's construction to minority- and women-owned business enterprises (MWBEs), only 8.6% of contracts had been awarded to MWBEs by mid-2001. Following a small protest by one group of minority workers, the Port Authority agreed to hire consultants and create a committee to oversee the awarding of contracts. Despite the September 11 attacks later the same year, work on the project was not interrupted.

As part of the AirTrain's construction, a renovation of the Jamaica LIRR station was announced in 2000. A $75 million renovation of the Howard Beach station was completed in May 2001, with an ADA-compliant transfer to and from the AirTrain. The same month, work started on the renovation of the Jamaica station, which entailed building a transfer passageway to the AirTrain; the Port Authority planned to spend $326 million on the AirTrain terminal and some work on the LIRR station at Jamaica. Though the Jamaica station's rehabilitation was originally supposed to be finished by 2005, it was not completed until September 2006.

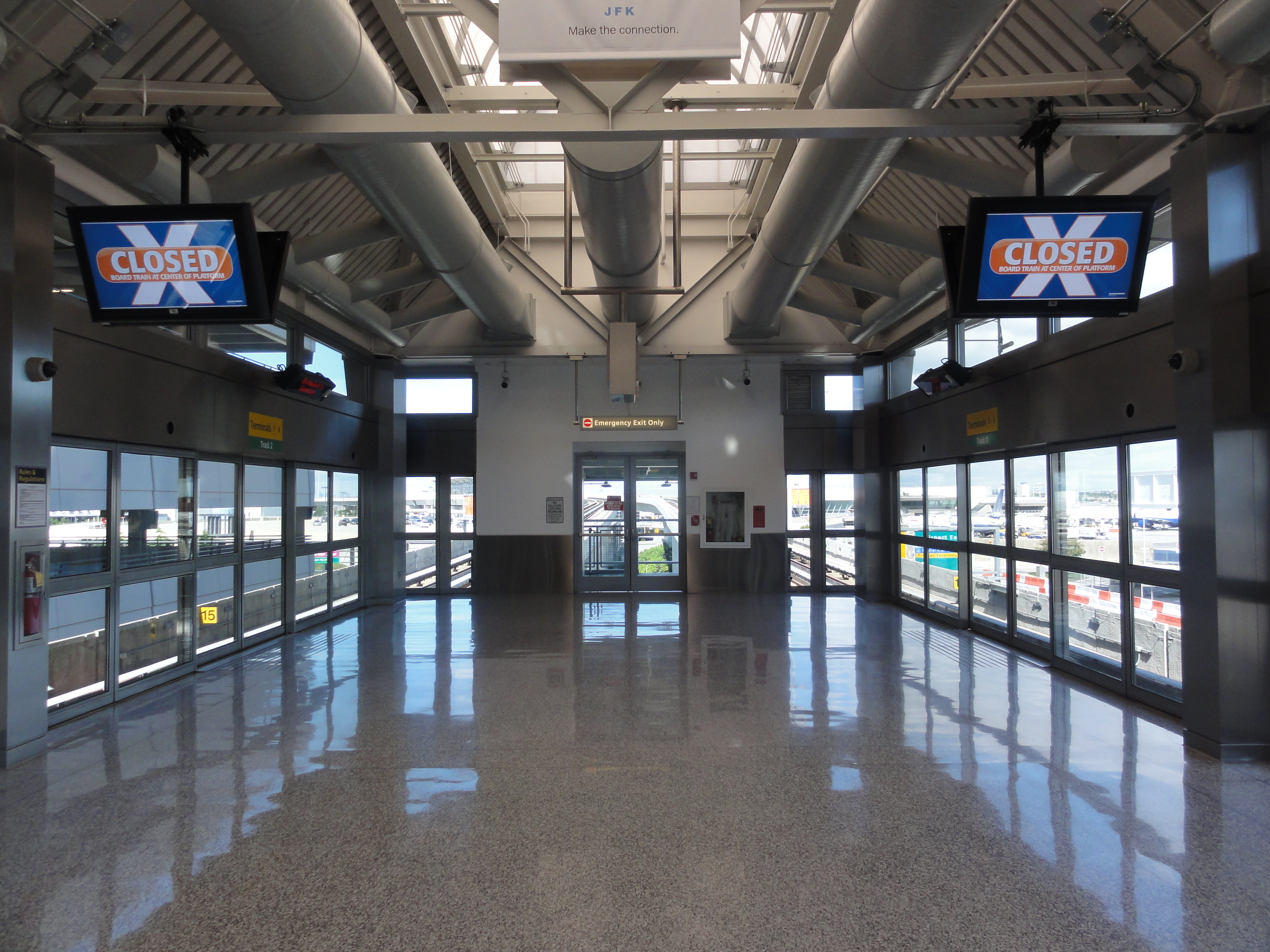
Terminal 5 station interior

Service was originally planned to begin on the Howard Beach branch in October 2002, followed by the Jamaica branch in 2003, but the opening was delayed because of incidents during testing. In July 2002, three workers were injured during an AirTrain derailment. By the next month, the guideway, most of the stations and substations, and the rolling stock were complete, and test trains were running on the system. Bombardier employee Kelvin DeBourgh was piloting a test train with concrete ballast blocks when his train derailed in September 2002, causing the blocks to tilt forward and kill him. DeBourgh's death prompted an investigation by the National Transportation Safety Board (NTSB), which found that the train had been speeding on a curve; in particular, it had been going as fast as 55 mph (89 km/h) on a segment of track that was meant to be traversed at 25 mph (40 km/h). Further investigations found that DeBourgh's supervisors had not correctly trained him.

The opening was postponed indefinitely as officials looked into the cause of the derailment that killed DeBourgh. In February 2003, the Port Authority announced that the system could open that June, although the opening was then delayed further. Work on the stations continued throughout early 2003, and the Port Authority resumed test runs of the system in April after its internal safety board found that DeBourgh's death had not been caused by the system's design. DeBourgh's family sued the Port Authority and Bombardier in September 2003, as the new Jamaica terminal was being unveiled. At the time, the system was planned to open by the end of the year. The AirRail Transit Consortium said in November 2003 that it would open the entire system later that month, but this date was subsequently delayed to December 17. The latter date was chosen to mark the centennial of the Wright Flyer's maiden flight, as well as to accommodate increased air traffic for the Christmas and holiday season.

=== Opening and early years ===
The system opened on December 17, 2003, and was fare-free on its first day. According to Newsday, politicians were optimistic about the AirTrain, but travelers' enthusiasm was dampened by the fact that travelers had to transfer—though, the paper said, "the stations where the schlepping will take place are polished and sleek". Newsday, which sent several reporters to test out whether the LIRR and AirTrain were faster than a car and a taxi, said the AirTrain was ideal for people "looking for a modern ride removed from the stresses of the roadway". The New York Daily News said that riders had mixed opinions of the new system. A writer for The New York Times said that, while the system was superior to the bus routes that it replaced, the AirTrain was "a complicated travel experience" that required a transfer, necessitated an additional fare, and lacked adequate signage.

Southeast Queens residents feared the project could become a boondoggle, as the construction cost of the system had increased to $1.9 billion. This figure was $400 million over what had been budgeted for the system in 1999. Like other Port Authority properties, the AirTrain did not receive subsidies from the state or city for its operating costs. This was one of the reasons cited for the system's relatively high initial $5 fare, which was more than twice the subway's fare at the time of the AirTrain's opening. The Port Authority predicted that the AirTrain's opening would create 118 jobs at JFK Airport. Crain's New York Business said in 2003 that the system's opening and other upgrades at JFK Airport would allow the airport to accommodate 50 million annual passengers by 2007; by comparison, the airport had recorded 31.7 million travelers in 2003.

Early riders had difficulty finding the trains because navigational signs were still covered up. In its first month of service, the system experienced several outages, delays, and lower-than-expected ridership, and some travelers could not easily find the system because it was not shown on LIRR and subway maps. These issues had subsided by the AirTrain's first anniversary, when Bombardier reported that the system had an uptime rate of between 97 and 99 percent.

==== Effects on development ====
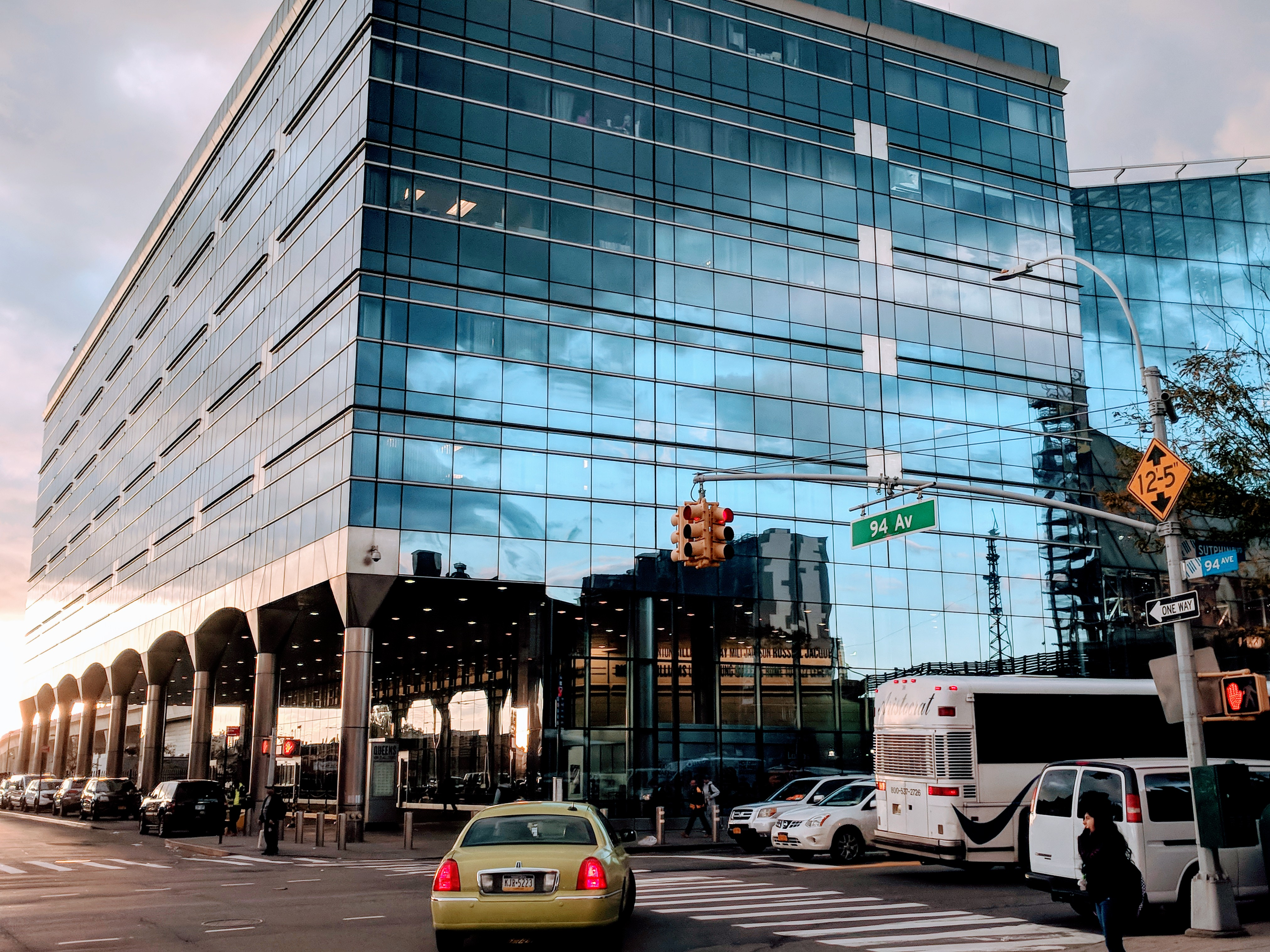
Exterior of the AirTrain station building at Jamaica station

Several projects were developed in Jamaica in anticipation of the system's opening, and local civic leaders hoped the system would help revitalize downtown Jamaica. The Jamaica Center Mall, Joseph P. Addabbo Federal Building, the Civil Court, and a Food and Drug Administration laboratory and offices were all built in the five years before the AirTrain opened. As early as 2000, local leaders had envisioned hotels, offices, and parking around the AirTrain station in Jamaica. One development firm began constructing a 300,000-square-foot (28,000 m^{2}) office building at the site in 2001. Another project, a 250-room hotel above the AirTrain terminal, was deferred after the September 11 attacks. By mid-2003, a 500,000-square-foot (46,000 m^{2}), 16-story building was being planned on Sutphin Boulevard across from the Jamaica station; this structure was the first building in a planned mixed-use development spanning 4,500,000 square feet (420,000 m^{2}).

After AirTrain JFK began operating, Jamaica saw a boom in commerce, and the area around Sutphin Boulevard in particular was expected to attract more business activity. A 15-screen movie theater opened in the area in early 2004, and developers were also planning a 13-floor building in the area. In 2004, the city proposed rezoning 40 blocks of Jamaica, centered around the AirTrain station, as a commercial area. According to the RPA, the rezoning was part of a proposal to re-envision Jamaica as a "regional center" because of the area's high usage as a transit hub. During the average weekday, 100,000 LIRR riders and 53,000 subway riders traveled to or from Jamaica, and the Port Authority had estimated that the AirTrain JFK would carry 12.4 million passengers a year. The area was rezoned in September 2007, and the first development to be proposed in the rezoned area, a 13-story merchandise mart and showroom building, was announced the next month.

A New York Times reporter wrote that the presence of AirTrain JFK riders was one factor in the redevelopment of downtown Jamaica, where, by 2011, three budget hotels had been developed near the Jamaica station. The area west of the Jamaica station was still underdeveloped, so many travelers chose to transfer to the LIRR or subway in Jamaica rather than stay there overnight.

==== Unbuilt extensions ====
Plans to extend the AirTrain to Manhattan were examined even before the system's opening. In 1998, the Port Authority examined the possibility of reactivating the abandoned Rockaway Beach Branch, allowing LIRR trains to run from Manhattan directly onto the Howard Beach Branch. The RPA also published a report in 1999, in which it recommended the construction of new lines and stations for the New York City Subway. The plan included one service that would travel from Grand Central Terminal to JFK Airport via what eventually became the AirTrain. Ultimately, the MTA rejected the RPA's proposal.

U.S. senator Chuck Schumer had proposed a direct rail link from JFK Airport to Manhattan's Fulton Center the day the AirTrain opened. Between September 2003 and April 2004, several agencies, including the MTA and the Port Authority, conducted a feasibility study of the Lower Manhattan–Jamaica/JFK Transportation Project, which would allow trains to travel directly from JFK Airport to Manhattan. The study examined 40 alternatives, and four options for extending the AirTrain had been announced by early 2004. The project was halted in 2008 before an environmental impact statement could be created. Though a direct route to Grand Central was never built, the LIRR's East Side Access project opened in 2023, connecting the East Side of Manhattan to the Jamaica station. However, passengers were still required to transfer between the LIRR and AirTrain at Jamaica.

=== Renovation of JFK Airport ===
On January 4, 2017, the office of New York Governor Andrew Cuomo announced a $7–10 billion plan to renovate JFK Airport. As part of the project, the AirTrain JFK would either see lengthened trainsets or a direct track connection to the rest of New York City's transportation system, and a direct connection between the AirTrain, LIRR, and subway would be built at Jamaica station. Shortly after Cuomo's announcement, the Regional Plan Association published an unrelated study for a possible direct rail link between Manhattan and JFK Airport. Yet another study in September 2018, published by the MTA, examined alternatives for an LIRR rail link to JFK as part of a possible restoration of the abandoned Rockaway Beach Branch.

In July 2017, Cuomo's office began accepting submissions for master plans to renovate the airport. The next year, Cuomo released details of the project, whose cost had grown to $13 billion. The improvements included lengthening AirTrains as well as adding lanes to the Van Wyck Expressway. The Terminal 2 station was closed on July 11, 2022, prior to the permanent closure of Terminal 2 six months later. To accommodate the reconstruction of Terminal 1, the PANYNJ closed the Terminal 1 station for seven months starting on May 1, 2023. The station was reopened in December 2023. Alstom, which had purchased Bombardier's rail operations in 2021, extended its contract with the Port Authority in 2025, agreeing to operate the AirTrain for seven more years. In November 2025, as part of its 2026–2035 capital plan, the Port Authority announced plans to renovate AirTrain stations so they could accommodate trains with higher passenger capacities.

== System ==
=== Routes ===
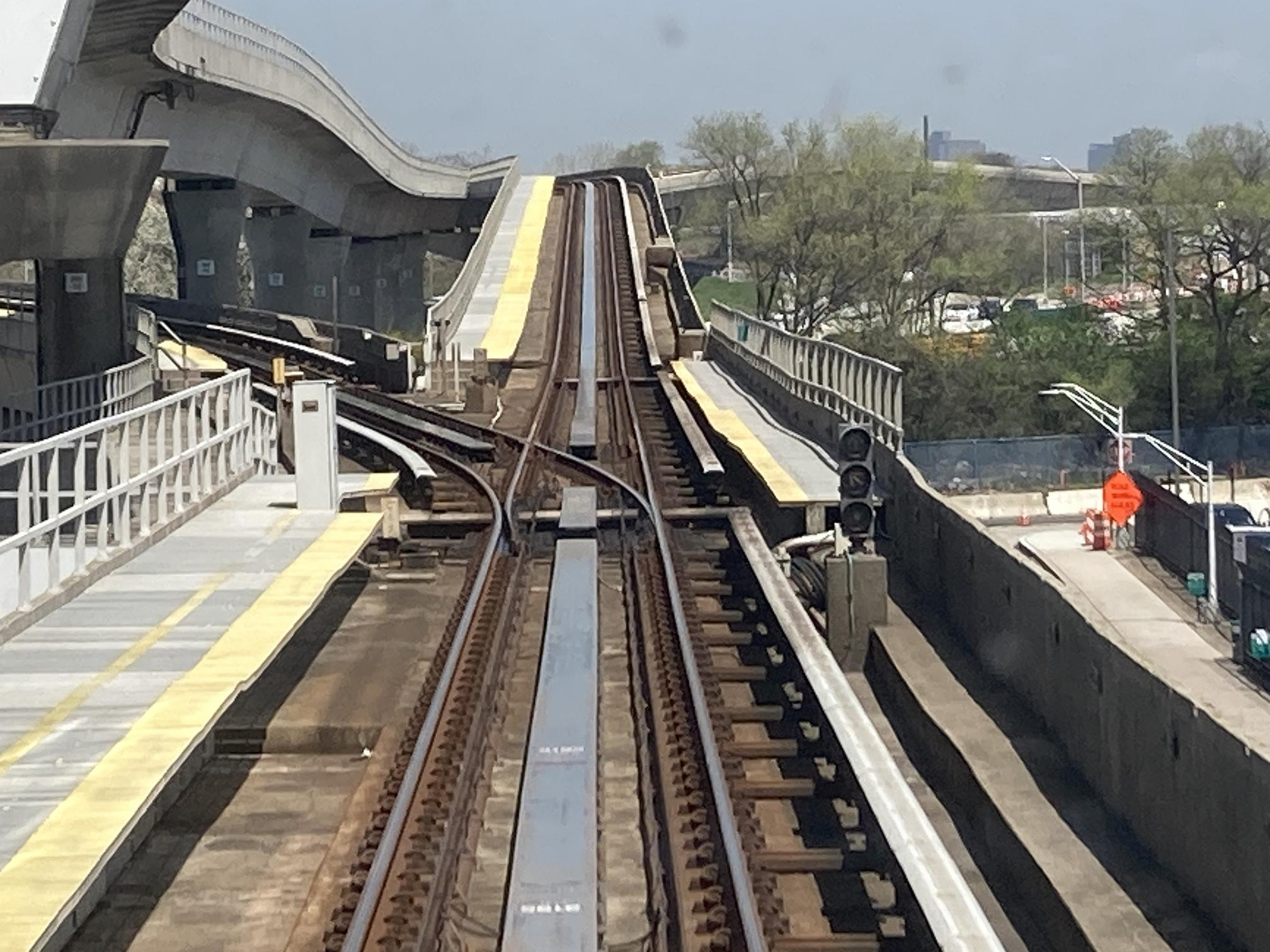
The tracks diverge at the Federal Circle station. The track continuing straight goes to Jamaica, while the track diverging to the left goes to Howard Beach.

AirTrain JFK connects the airport's terminals and parking areas with the Howard Beach and Jamaica stations. It runs entirely within the New York City borough of Queens. The system consists of three routes: two connecting the terminals with either the Howard Beach or Jamaica stations, and one route looping continuously around the central terminal area. It is operated by Alstom under contract to the Port Authority. Trains to and from Jamaica and Howard Beach were originally planned to run every two minutes during peak hours, with alternate trains traveling to each branch. The final environmental impact statement projected that trains in the central terminal area would run every ninety seconds. By 2014 actual frequencies were much lower: each branch was served by one train every seven to 12 minutes during peak hours. Trains arrived every 10 to 15 minutes on each branch during weekdays, every 15 to 20 minutes during late nights, and every 16 minutes during weekends.

The Howard Beach Train route (colored green on the official map) begins and ends at the Howard Beach–JFK Airport station, where there is a direct transfer to the New York City Subway's A train. It makes an additional stop at Lefferts Boulevard, where passengers can transfer to parking lot shuttle buses, the Q3 bus to Jamaica, the B15 bus to Brooklyn, and the Q10 rush and Q80 local buses. The segment from Howard Beach to Federal Circle, which is about 1.8 miles (2.9 km) long, passes over the long-term and employee parking lots.

The Jamaica Train route (colored red on the official map) begins and ends at the Jamaica station, adjacent to the Long Island Rail Road platforms there. The Jamaica station contains a connection to the Sutphin Boulevard–Archer Avenue–JFK Airport station on the New York City Subway's E, J, and Z trains. The AirTrain and LIRR stations contain transfers to the subway, as well as to ground-level bus routes. West of Jamaica, the line travels above the north side of 94th Avenue before curving southward onto the Van Wyck Expressway. The segment from Jamaica to Federal Circle is about 3.1 miles (5.0 km) long.

The Howard Beach Train and Jamaica Train routes merge at Federal Circle for car rental companies and shuttle buses to hotels and the airport's cargo areas. South of Federal Circle, the routes share track for 1.5 miles (2.4 km) and enter a tunnel before the tracks separate in two directions for the 2-mile (3.2 km) terminal loop. Both routes continue counterclockwise around the loop, stopping at Terminals 1, 4, 5, 7, and 8 in that order. A connection to the Q3 local bus is available at Terminal 8. The travel time from either Jamaica or Howard Beach to the JFK terminals is about eight minutes.

The Airport Terminals Loop (colored gold on the official map), an airport terminal circulator, runs clockwise around each terminal, in the opposite direction of the Howard Beach and Jamaica routes. The terminal area loop is 1.8 miles (2.9 km) long.

=== Stations ===
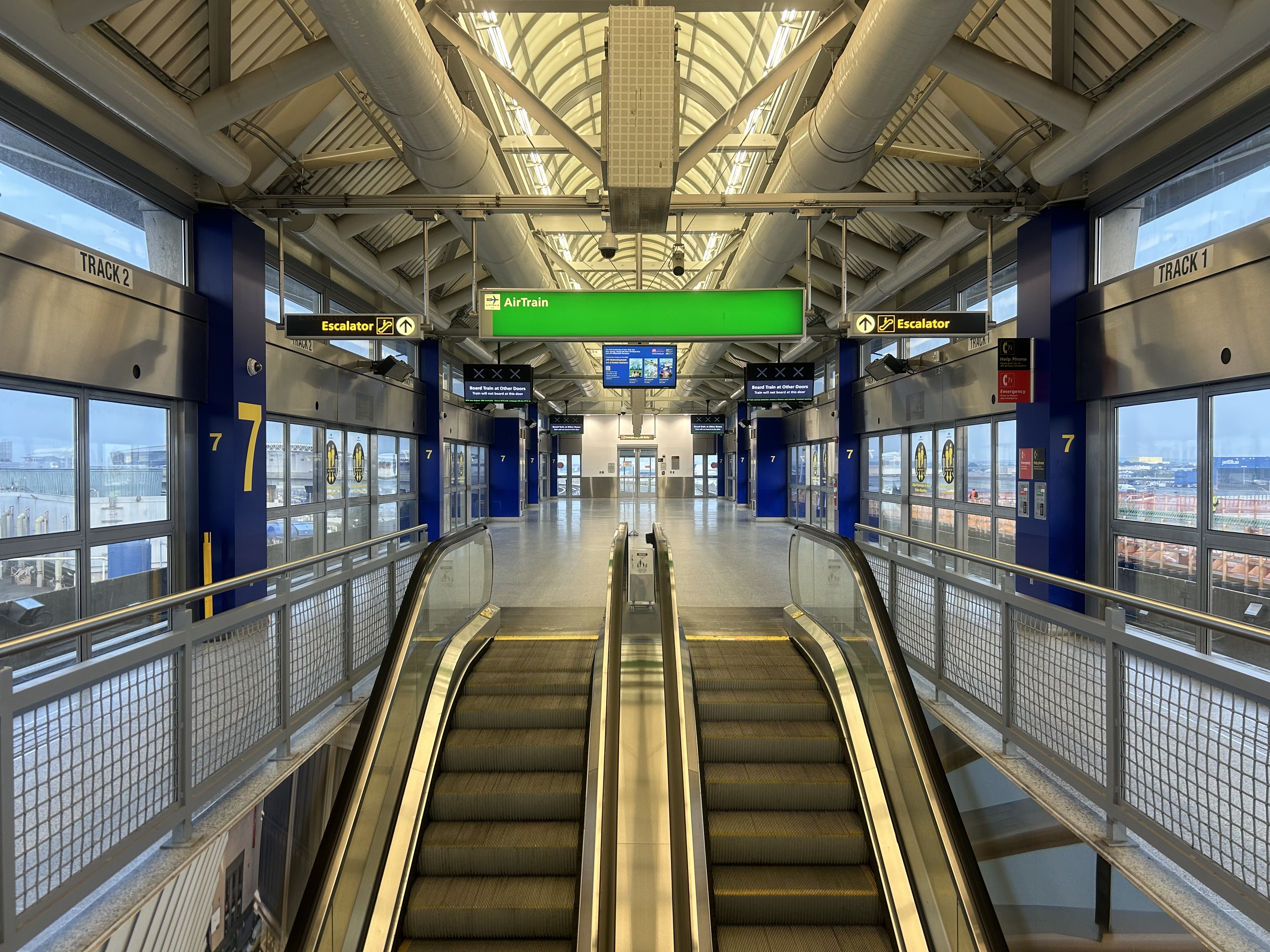
Terminal 7 station interior

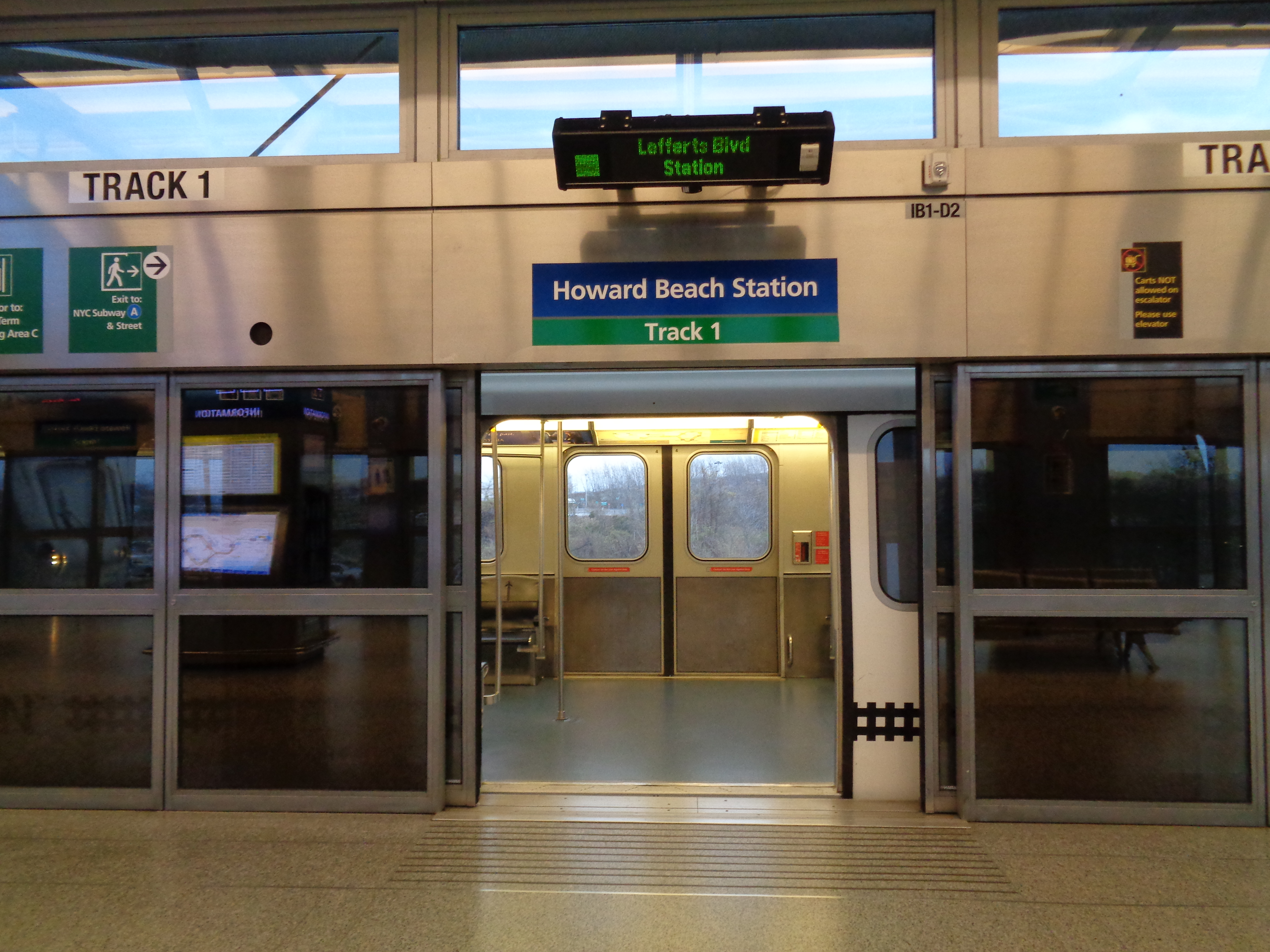
Platform screen doors (shown here at Howard Beach station) are present on all AirTrain JFK platforms.

All AirTrain JFK stations contain elevators and are compliant with the Americans with Disabilities Act of 1990 (ADA). Each platform is 240 feet (73 m) long and can fit up to four cars. The stations include air conditioning, as well as platform screen doors that protect passengers and allow the unmanned trains to operate safely. Escalators and elevators are included in each station, and moving walkways are incorporated into the design of the terminal-area stations. Each station also contains safety systems such as CCTV cameras, alarms, and emergency contact points, and is staffed by attendants.

All the stations have island platforms except for Federal Circle, which has a bi-level split platform layout. The Jamaica and Howard Beach stations are designed as "gateway stations" to give passengers the impression of entering the airport. There are also stations at Lefferts Boulevard, as well as Terminals 1, 4, 5, 7, and 8. Three former terminals, numbered 3, 6, and 9, were respectively served by the stations that were later renamed Terminals 2, 5, and 8. The four stations outside the Central Terminal Area were originally designated with the letters A–D alongside their names; the letters were later dropped. After Terminal 2 station closed in 2022, Terminal 1 station temporarily served passengers for both terminals, until the closure of Terminal 2 in January 2023.

STV Inc., the AirTrain's main architectural and engineering designer, was tasked with creating a consistent design for the stations and infrastructure, and Jonathan Cohn of STV was the design director. the Jamaica station was designed by Voorsanger Architects, and Robert Davidson of the Port Authority's in-house architecture department designed the Howard Beach station. Most stations in the airport are outdoors, but the Terminal 4 station is within the mezzanine of that terminal. The Jamaica station was designed with a footbridge leading from the AirTrain terminal above the LIRR tracks to the subway, as well as space for a hotel on top of it. Each station's construction was divided into nine components (such as connections to parking garages), and construction materials were customized to the specific needs of each station site.

Station	Lines	Connections	Notes
Howard Beach 40°39′40″N 73°49′46″W	Howard Beach Train	Long-term parking (area C); Ride app pick-up; New York City Subway: A train (at Howard Beach–JFK Airport); MTA Bus: Q11	Entrance and exit fare required for subway/bus connections; originally designated Station A
Lefferts Boulevard 40°39′41″N 73°49′22″W	Howard Beach Train	Vehicular drop-off, pick-up, and waiting area; Long-term parking (areas A and B); New York City Bus: B15, Q3; MTA Bus: Q10, Q80	Originally designated Station B
Jamaica 40°41′57″N 73°48′29″W	Jamaica Train	Long Island Rail Road: Jamaica station; New York City Subway: E, J, and Z trains (at Sutphin Boulevard–Archer Avenue–JFK Airport); New York City Bus: Q1, Q20, Q24, Q30, Q31, Q43, Q44 SBS, Q54, Q56, Q75; MTA Bus: Q6, Q8, Q9, Q25, Q40, Q41, Q60, Q65; Nassau Inter-County Express: n4	Entrance and exit fare required; originally designated Station D
Federal Circle 40°39′36″N 73°48′13″W	Howard Beach Train; Jamaica Train	Rental car facilities; Shuttles for hotels, cargo areas, and off-airport rental car lots; Long-term parking (Federal Circle)	Originally designated Station C
Terminal 1 40°38′37″N 73°47′22″W	Airport Terminals Loop; Howard Beach Train; Jamaica Train	Terminal 1	
~~Terminal 2/3~~ (closed) 40°38′31″N 73°47′13″W	Airport Terminals Loop; Howard Beach Train; Jamaica Train	Terminal 2 (closed 2023); Terminal 3 (demolished 2013)	Permanently closed and demolished
Terminal 4 40°38′38″N 73°46′56″W	Airport Terminals Loop; Howard Beach Train; Jamaica Train	Terminal 4; Short-term parking (Blue Garage)	
Terminal 5 40°38′49″N 73°46′48″W	Airport Terminals Loop; Howard Beach Train; Jamaica Train	Terminal 5; Short-term parking (Yellow Garage); TWA Hotel	Originally named Terminals 5/6
Terminal 7 40°38′54″N 73°47′00″W	Airport Terminals Loop; Howard Beach Train; Jamaica Train	Terminal 7; Short-term parking (Orange Garage)	
Terminal 8 40°38′48″N 73°47′19″W	Airport Terminals Loop; Howard Beach Train; Jamaica Train	Terminal 8; Short-term parking (Red Garage); New York City Bus: Q3	Originally named Terminals 8/9

=== Tracks and infrastructure ===
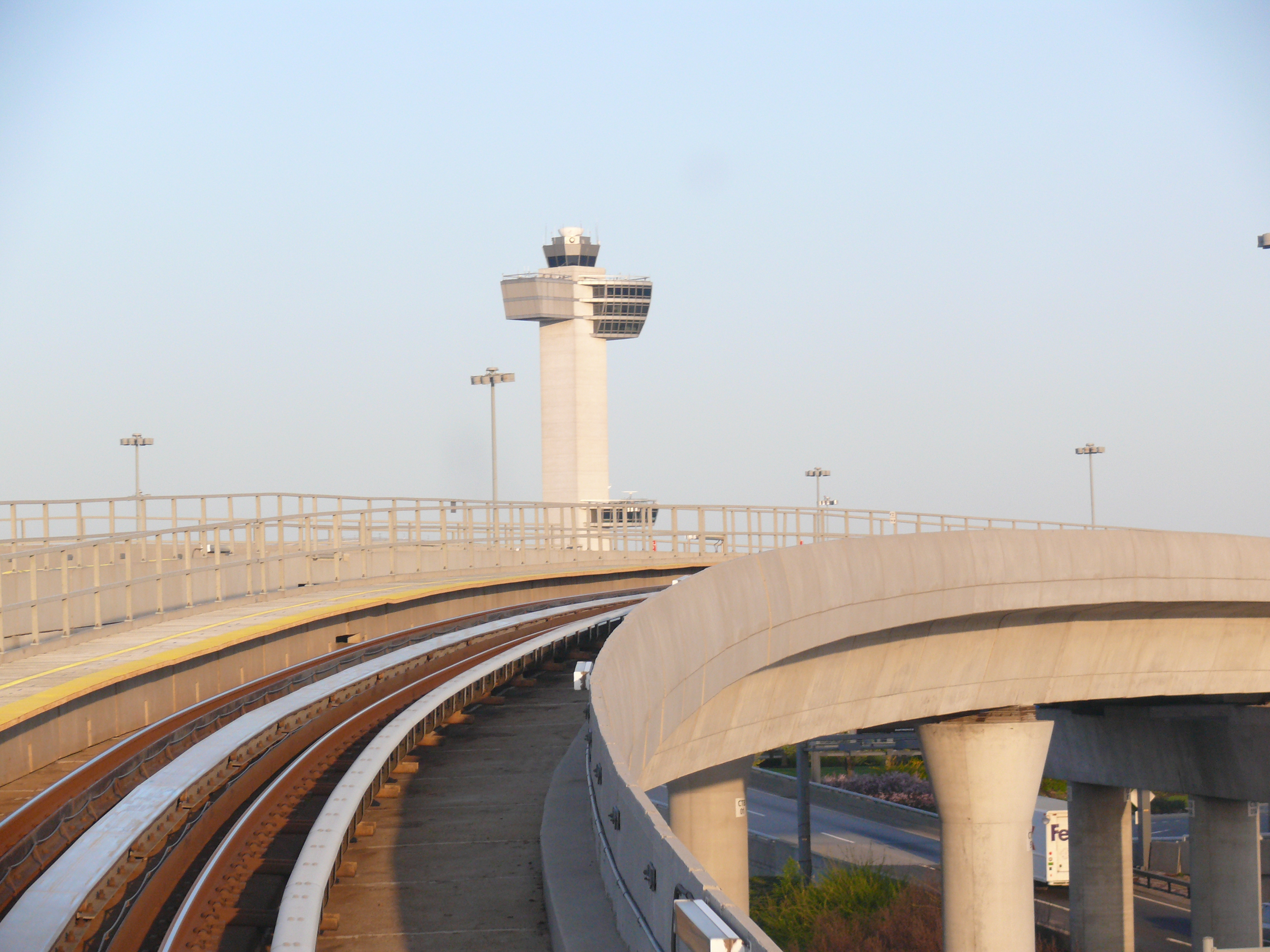
View of JFK Airport's control tower from the AirTrain guideway

The AirTrain has a route length of 8.1 miles (13.0 km). (Note: Also cited as 8.2 miles (13.2 km)) The system consists of 6.0 mi (9.7 km) or 6.3 miles (10.1 km) of single-track guideway viaducts, as well as 3.2 miles (5.1 km) of double-track guideway viaducts. AirTrain JFK is mostly elevated, though there are short segments that run underground or at ground level, totaling about 1.5 miles (2.4 km). Trains are operated from and maintained at a 10-acre (4 ha) train yard between Lefferts Boulevard and Federal Circle, atop a former employee parking lot.

The elevated sections were built with precast single and dual guideway spans, the underground sections used cut-and-cover. The ground-level sections, including the train yards, used concrete ties and ballast trackbeds. The single guideway viaducts carry one track each and are 19 feet 3 inches (5.87 m) wide, while the double guideway viaducts carry two tracks each and are 31 feet 0 inches (9.45 m) wide. Columns support the precast concrete elevated sections at intervals of up to 40 feet (12 m). The elevated structures run up to 40 feet above the Van Wyck Expressway. Workers fabricated 5,500 precast concrete sections in Cape Charles, Virginia, which were then shipped to Camden, New Jersey, before being installed in Queens. The elevated structures use seismic isolation bearings and soundproof barriers to protect from small earthquakes as well as prevent noise pollution. AirTrain JFK's tunnels, all within the airport, pass beneath two taxiways and several highway ramps.

The AirTrain runs on steel tracks that are continuously welded across all joints except at the terminals; the guideway viaducts are also continuously joined. Trains use double crossovers at the Jamaica and Howard Beach terminals in order to switch to the track going in the opposite direction. There are also crossover switches north and south of Federal Circle, counterclockwise from Terminal 8, and clockwise from Terminal 1.

The tracks are set at a gauge of 4 ft 8 1/2 in (1,435 mm). This enables possible future conversion to LIRR or subway use, or a possible connection to LIRR or subway tracks for a one-trip ride into Manhattan, since these systems use the same track gauge. AirTrain's current rolling stock, or train cars, are not able to use either LIRR or subway tracks due to the cars' inadequate structural strength and the different methods of propulsion used on each system. In particular, the linear induction motor system that propels the AirTrain is incompatible with the traction motor manual-propulsion system used by LIRR and subway rolling stock. If a one-seat ride is ever implemented, a hybrid-use vehicle would be needed to operate on subway or LIRR tracks in addition to AirTrain tracks.

There are seven electrical substations. The redundancy allows trains to operate even if there are power outages at one substation. Since there are no emergency exits between stations, a control tower can automatically guide the train to its next stop in case of an emergency.

== Fares ==
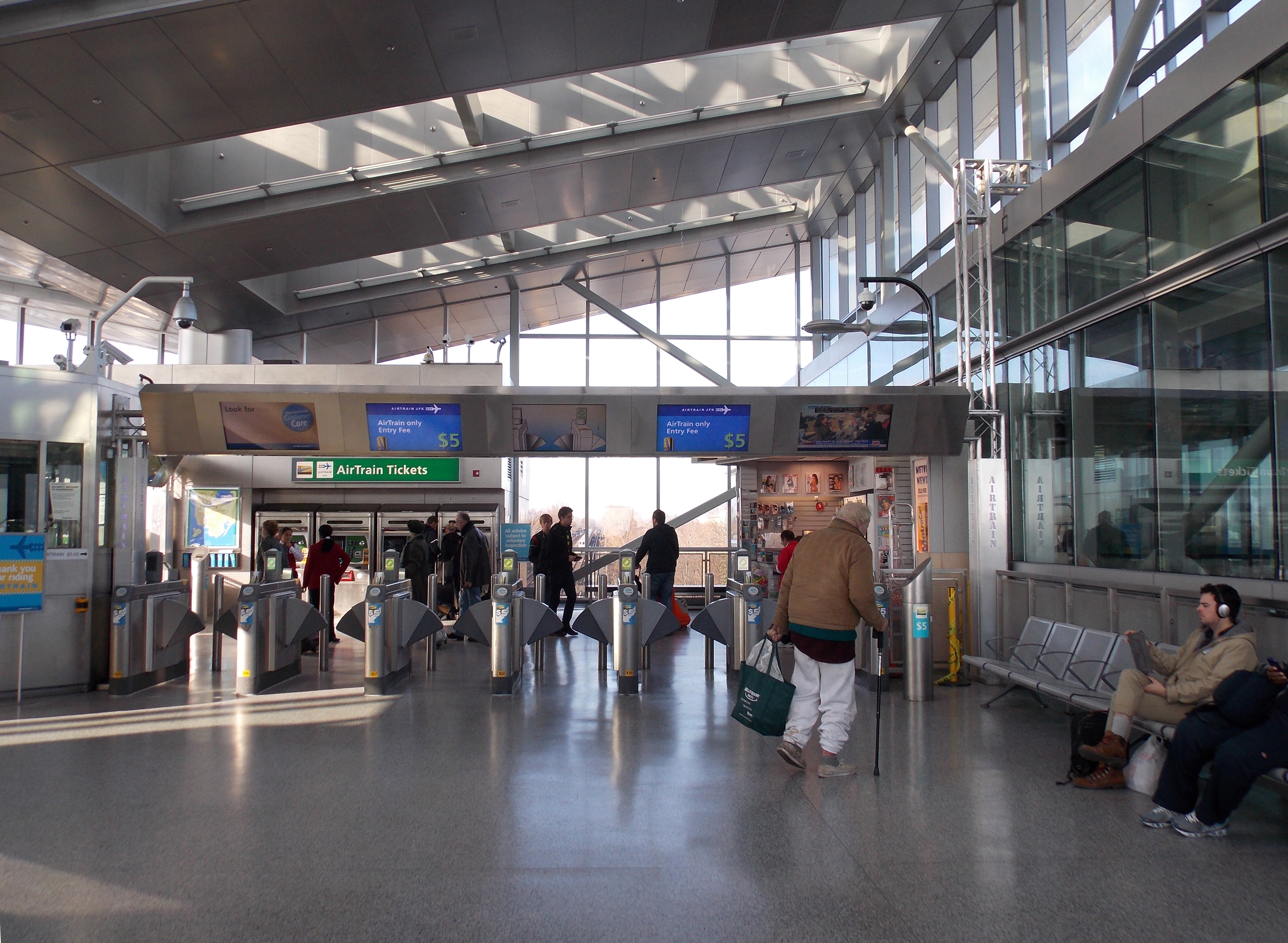
Faregates at Howard Beach–JFK Airport

AirTrain JFK is free to use for travel within the terminal area, as well as at the Lefferts Boulevard station, which is next to the long-term parking, and at the Federal Circle station, where there are shuttle buses to hotels and car rental companies. Passengers entering or leaving the system at the Jamaica or Howard Beach stations must pay using MetroCard or OMNY (which includes contactless payment using bank cards or mobile devices). AirTrain JFK started accepting OMNY on October 10, 2023, although only some turnstiles initially had OMNY readers. General MetroCard sales ended on December 31, 2025, although as of January 2026, there were still some local stores that sold 10-trip and 30-day AirTrain MetroCards.

AirTrain JFK charges passengers $8.75 to enter or leave the system at the Jamaica and Howard Beach stations. OMNY vending machines are located on both sides of the faregates at each station, a $2 fee is charged for new OMNY cards. These products, intended for frequent users of the system, provide a significant discount compared with the one-way OMNY fare. As of June 2026, AirTrain JFK issues discounts through OMNY cards and devices (30-day fare cap: $43.50; Group fare: up to 5 riders for $26.75, if each rider pays within 5 minutes on the same card or devices).

There are no free transfers between AirTrain JFK and connecting transit services. For passengers transferring to or from local buses or the subway, an additional $3 fare is charged and is paid via OMNY. Passengers transferring to or from a Manhattan-bound LIRR train at Jamaica pay an additional $7.25 during peak hours or $5.25 during off-peak hours and weekends, using the railroad's CityTicket program.

The fare to enter or exit at Howard Beach and Jamaica was originally $5, though preliminary plans included a discounted fare of $2 for airport and airline employees. In June 2019, the Port Authority proposed raising AirTrain JFK's fare to $7.75, and the fare increase was approved that September. The new fares took effect on November 1, 2019, representing the first fare raise in the system's history. In November 2021, the Port Authority discussed plans to raise the fare a second time, to $8; this fare increase took effect on March 1, 2022. The fare was increased once more to $8.25 on March 5, 2023, then to $8.50 on March 3, 2024. From July 1 through September 2, 2024, fares were reduced by 50% to $4.25 due to road construction at JFK Airport; the fare was again reduced to $4.25 between June 30 and September 1, 2025. As of March 2026, the fare had been raised to $8.75.

== Rolling stock ==
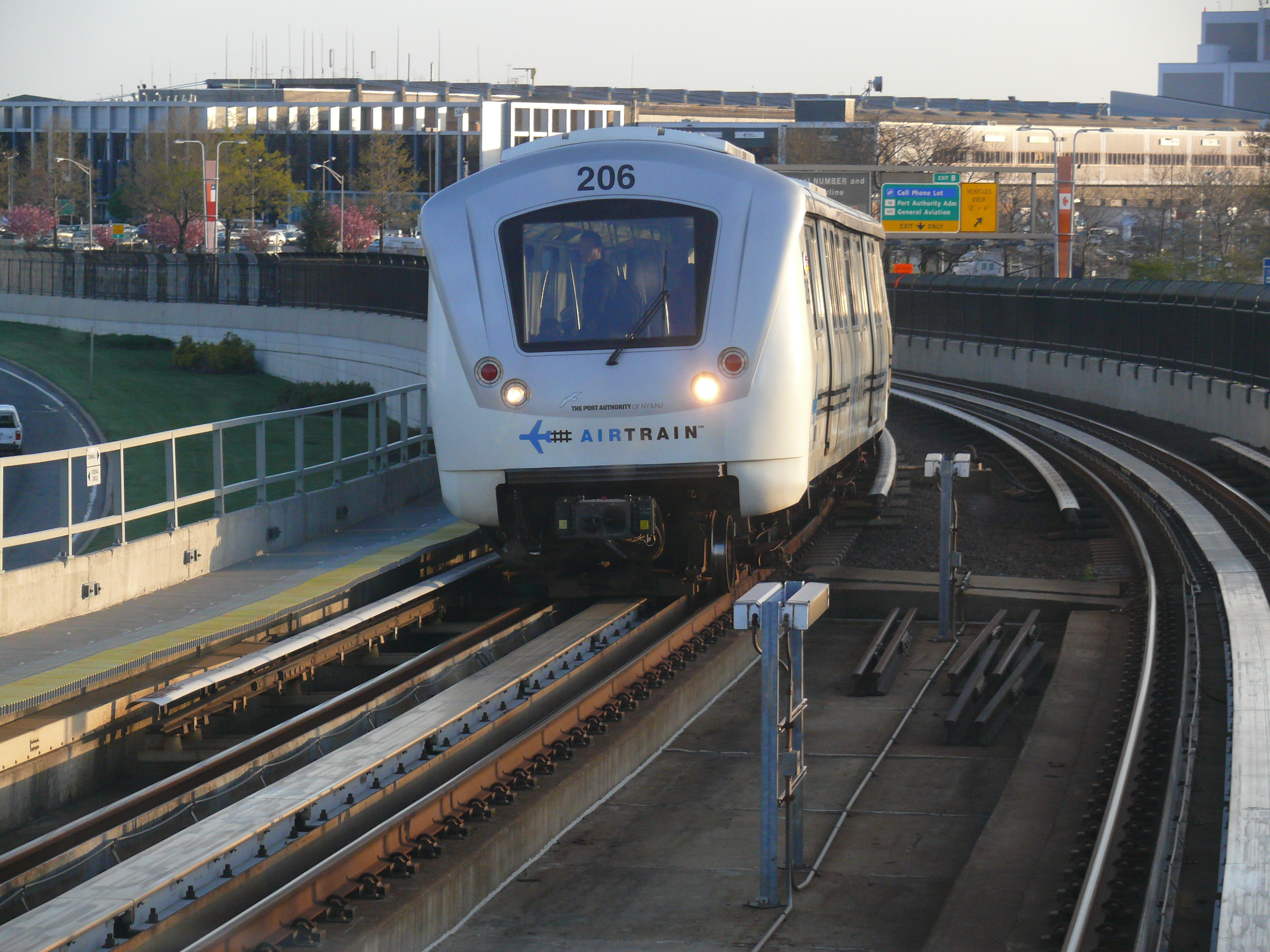
The Innovia Metro ART 200 rolling stock used on AirTrain JFK

AirTrain JFK uses Innovia Metro ART 200 rolling stock and technology, similar to those used on the SkyTrain in Vancouver, the Everline in Yongin, and the Kelana Jaya Line in Kuala Lumpur. The computerized trains are fully automated and use a communications-based train control system with moving block signals to dynamically determine the locations of the trains. AirTrain JFK is a wholly driverless system, and it uses SelTrac train-signaling technology manufactured by Thales Group. The system originally used pre-recorded announcements by New York City traffic reporter Bernie Wagenblast, a longtime Port Authority employee.

The 32 individual, non-articulated Mark II vehicles operating on the line draw power from a 750 V DC top-running third rail. A linear induction motor pushes magnetically against an aluminum strip in the center of the track. The vehicles also have steerable trucks that can navigate sharp curves and steep grades, as well as align precisely with the platform doors at the stations. The cars can run at up to 60 miles per hour (97 km/h), and they can operate on trackage with a minimum railway curve radius of 230 feet (70 m).

Each car is 57 feet 9 inches (17.60 m) long and 10 feet 2 inches (3.10 m) wide, similar to the dimensions of the rolling stock used on the New York City Subway's B Division. Trains can run in either direction and can consist of between one and four cars. The cars have two pairs of doors on each side; each door opening is 10 feet 5 inches (3.18 m) wide. An individual car has 26 seats and can carry up to 97 passengers with luggage, or 205 without luggage. Because most passengers carry luggage, the actual operating capacity is between 75 and 78 passengers per car.

== Ridership ==
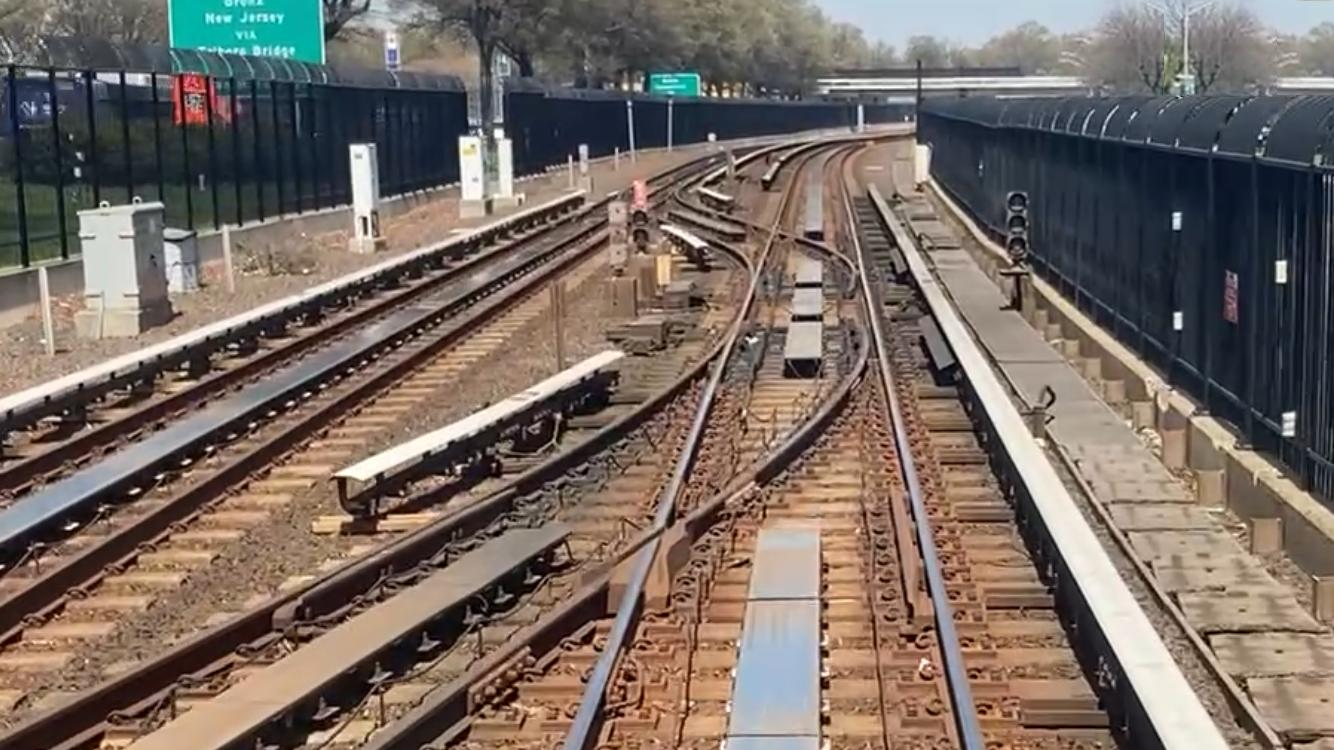
A section of tracks that runs along the Van Wyck Expressway

When AirTrain JFK was being planned, it was expected that 11,000 passengers per day would pay to ride the system between the airport and either Howard Beach or Jamaica, evenly split between employees and airline passengers. Projections also showed that 23,000 more daily passengers would use the AirTrain to travel between terminals. This would amount to about 4 million paying passengers and 8.4 million in-airport passengers per year. According to the FEIS, the system could accommodate over 3,000 daily riders from Manhattan, and its opening would result in approximately 75,000 fewer vehicle miles (121,000 kilometers) being driven each day. The Port Authority's research showed that, when the system opened, eight percent of its riders would be from Long Island, while up to 70 percent would travel from Manhattan.

During the first month of service, between 15,000 and 20,000 passengers rode the system each day, less than the expected daily ridership of 34,000. Nonetheless, the AirTrain JFK had become the second-busiest airport transportation system in the United States. Within its first six months, AirTrain JFK had transported one million riders; this had increased to 2.5 million by the first anniversary of the AirTrain. By the end of 2004, the system had about 8,000 or 8,500 paying riders per day, although only 1,500 of these riders were employees. The Jamaica route had 4,500 paying riders, making it slightly more popular than the Howard Beach route, which had 4,000 paying riders. Paid ridership had reached 11,000 per day by 2006, when one in nine people flying to or from JFK used the AirTrain.

In the decade after the AirTrain opened, it consistently experienced year-over-year ridership growth. A New York Times article in 2009 observed that one possible factor in the AirTrain's increasing ridership was the $7.75 fare for AirTrain and subway, which was cheaper than the $52 taxi ride between Manhattan and JFK. In 2019, there were 8.7 million passengers who paid to travel between JFK Airport and either Howard Beach or Jamaica. This represented an increase of more than 300 percent from the 2.6 million riders who paid during the first full year of operation, 2004. An additional 12.2 million people were estimated to have ridden the AirTrain for free in 2019, placing total annual ridership at 20.9 million. Amid a decline in air travel caused by the COVID-19 pandemic, the AirTrain had 3.4 million total riders in 2021. In 2025, the system carried a total of 11,658,100 passengers, or about 30,700 per weekday as of the second quarter of 2026.

== See also ==
- AirTrain LaGuardia, a canceled system that would have been built for LaGuardia Airport
- AirTrain Newark, a similar system at Newark Liberty International Airport
- List of airport people mover systems
- Lists of rapid transit systems § North America
