= Creedmoor Branch =

Former Long Island Rail Road branch

Overview
- Status: Abandoned
- Owner: Long Island Rail Road
- Locale: Queens, New York, USA
- Termini: Great Neck Junction; Hinsdale
- Stations: 6

Service
- System: Long Island Rail Road
- Operator: Long Island Rail Road

History
- Opened: 1873 (as part of the Central Railroad of Long Island)
- Closed: 1966

Technical
- Number of tracks: 2
- Track gauge: 4 ft 8 1/2 in (1,435 mm)

The Creedmoor Branch was a short Long Island Rail Road branch between the Floral Park station and Creedmoor State Hospital in Queens, New York. The branch existed from 1879 to 1966 finally being torn up and demapped in the early 1970s.

== History ==
The Creedmoor Branch was originally part of the Central Railroad of Long Island (CRRLI) built by wealthy Long Islander Alexander Turney Stewart who was the founder of Garden City. The railroad was built from a juncture with the Flushing and North Side Railroad, called Great Neck Junction, in Flushing all the way to Babylon. The railroad had a mixed use as a passenger branch and freight branch that most notably served Stewart's brickworks in Bethpage, which supplied building materials as Garden City was being developed. In 1876 the Central was acquired by Conrad Poppenhausen who absorbed the Central into the LIRR. The right of way between Flushing and Creedmoor was deemed redundant and abandoned in 1879, although it was not torn up until World War I. The Central between Floral Park and Babylon was placed into service as the LIRR's Central Branch. What was left between Floral Park, then called Hinsdale, and Creedmoor was deemed the Creedmoor Branch by the LIRR.

The branch originally served passengers for a few years traveling to the Creedmoor Rifle Range, which predated the hospital. The branch was poorly situated, however, in that it had no direct connection into the LIRR's major hub Jamaica station. Passengers traveling east from Jamaica to Creedmoor had to change at Floral Park then backtrack to Creedmoor. Eventually the branch was downgraded to a secondary track and was mostly used throughout the twentieth century as a freight branch, primarily serving Creedmoor State Hospital, which replaced the rifle range, with daily coal deliveries. The Creedmoor Branch was officially considered a siding in 1921. The branch, however, was obviously important enough for the LIRR to undertake several grade crossing elimination projects along the line, most notably with the construction of a large steel trestle, built in the 1930s, to take the branch over Jamaica Avenue/Jericho Turnpike. The line was used for this nominal service until December 27, 1966, when it was finally put out of service. The line from 1,800 feet east of Floral Park to the Creedmoor lead track was taken out of service on October 1, 1973. The tracks were finally pulled up around 1973 with the trestle over Jamaica Avenue/Jericho Turnpike being dismantled in 1980. The right of way was absorbed by many of the homeowners who were given an opportunity to buy up the land that adjoined their properties.

In 1912, William Kissam Vanderbilt II used the Central Rail Road bridge over Bell Boulevard as part of the Long Island Motor Parkway right of way. This caused the parkway to curve slightly south for the crossing. New York State Parks Department later built a steel bridge over Bell Boulevard just north of the original site when they acquired the land for a bicycle path in 1938. The original Rail Road right of way leading to the bridge can still be seen when going east immediately prior to the current crossing.

The right-of-way in Queens Village and Floral Park was sold for private home backyards.

Today there are few remains of the branch. A section of rail, that had been paved over, still exists on the Creedmoor property. Most notably the uniquely angled street pattern in the Queens Village area of Queens around Winchester Blvd, which was built around the branch, still exists today marking the path of the right of way. In addition, a section of the right-of-way between Jericho Turnpike and South Tyson Avenue is an all-handicapped parking space for Floral Park station that requires either a daily fee or a Village of Floral Park Resident/Non-Resident permit.

== Station listing ==
| Station Name | Miles (kilometers) to Penn Station | Date opened | Date closed | Notes location |
|---|---|---|---|---|
| Great Neck Junction | | July 1873 | April 30, 1879 | Also known as Central Junction. Shared by the Main Line of the Flushing and North Side Railroad (now Port Washington Branch of the LIRR), and Central RR of Long Island. Located west of Flushing-Main Street (LIRR station) near Whitestone Expressway |
| Hillside | | April 1874 | April 30, 1879 | |
| Kissena | | June 1873; June 1877 | August 1876; April 30, 1879 | Listed on some timetables as Kissena-Flushing, Flushing-Kissena, or Kissena Park. Moved to a private location, but burned on May 8, 1918. |
| Frankinston | | June 1873 | April 30, 1879 | On 73rd Avenue east of Clearview Expressway, now occupied by Cunningham Park |
| Creedmoor | | January 8, 1873 | 1881 | Listed on some timetables as National Rifle Range. Also served Creedmoor Psychiatric Hospital. |
| Hinsdale | | January 8, 1873 | April 30, 1879 | Also a former name of nearby Floral Park Station. Moved to a private location in April 1883. |
Connection from to Main Line from Creedmoor Wye, and Hempstead Branch from bridge over Main Line

== Sources ==
- Arrt's Arrchives
  - Central Branch of the Long Island Rail Road(The Stewart Line; Part 1 and Part 2)
  - Creedmoor and Flushing Branch
  - Flushing to Creedmoor; Part 1 and Part 2
  - Creedmoor to Floral Park; Part 1, Part 2, and Part 3
- Central Railroad of Long Island ROW (LIRR Unofficial History Site)
