= Q3 (New York City bus) =

Bus route in Queens, New York

q3
- Farmers Boulevard – JFK Airport
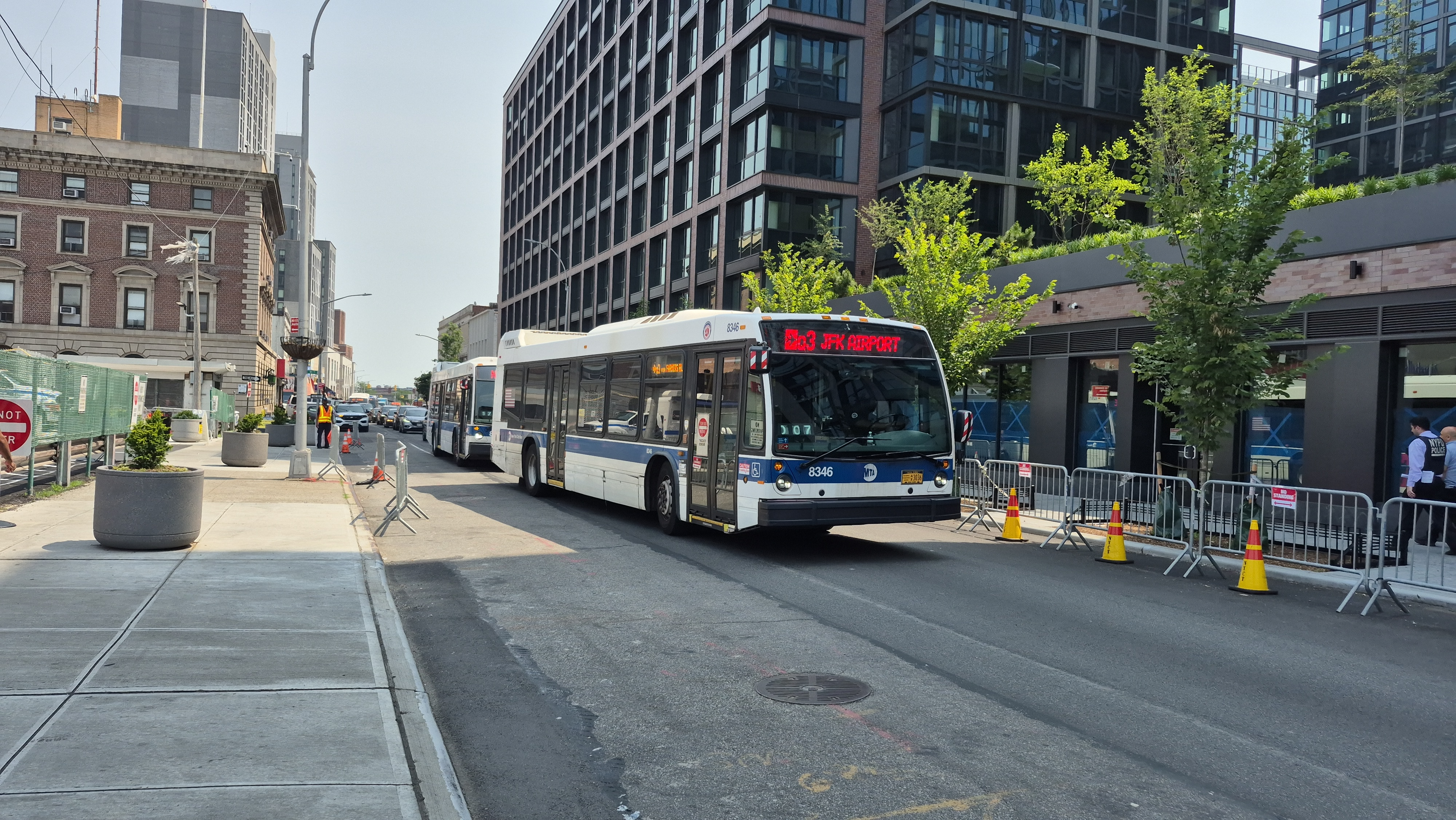
- A 2015 Nova Bus LFS (8346) on the JFK Airport-bound Q3 exiting the 168 Street Bus Terminal in June 2025.

Overview
- System: MTA Regional Bus Operations
- Operator: New York City Transit Authority
- Garage: Jamaica Depot
- Vehicle: Nova Bus LFS; New Flyer Xcelsior XD40

Route
- Locale: Queens, New York, U.S.
- Communities served: Jamaica, Jamaica Estates, Hollis, St. Albans, Rochdale Village, Springfield Gardens
- Start: Jamaica, Queens – 168th Street Terminal
- Via: Hillside Avenue, Farmers Boulevard
- End: JFK Airport – Lefferts Boulevard AirTrain station
- Length: 11.5 miles (18.5 km)

Service
- Operates: 24 hours
- Annual patronage: 1,804,565 (2025)
- Transfers: Yes
- Timetable: Q3

The Q3 bus route constitutes a public transit line in Queens, New York City, operating via Farmers Boulevard between the 165th Street Bus Terminal in Jamaica and John F. Kennedy International Airport.

== Route description and service ==
The JFK Airport-bound Q3 starts from Bay 5 at the 165th Street Bus Terminal in Jamaica, Queens. It then goes via Hillside Avenue, until it turns south onto Farmers Boulevard via 187th Place. The route continues through the neighborhoods of Hollis, stopping at the Long Island Rail Road (LIRR) station there. It then passes through St. Albans, before stopping at the LIRR station at Locust Manor. Then it continues, passing through Springfield Gardens before finally crossing Rockaway Boulevard, and then entering John F. Kennedy International Airport via North Boundary Road, 148th Street, and JFK Expressway, passing by the North Cargo Area and Central Terminal Area. After stopping at Terminal 8, the route travels west and north along the Van Wyck Expressway and its service road. The Q3 travels west around Federal Circle, then north along 130th Place, west along Pan Am Road, and north at Lefferts Boulevard. The Q3 terminates at the AirTrain JFK's Lefferts Boulevard station.

Jamaica-bound buses from Lefferts Boulevard largely follow the reverse routing. Buses travel south at Lefferts Boulevard, east along Pan Am Road, south along 130th Place, and south and east along the Van Wyck Expressway and its service road. After stopping at Terminal 8, the route turns along JFK Expressway, 148th Street, and North Boundary Road. Leaving the airport, the Jamaica-bound Q3 runs along Farmers Boulevard, then turns north on 188th Street and west on Hillside Avenue, terminating at Bay 5 of the 165th Street Bus Terminal.

A majority of the ridership of the Q3 is formed from airport employees from JFK. Upon the route's extension to JFK Airport, more riders began to use the Q3, there were increased employment opportunities in Queens, airport hires were encouraged to move to Queens, and road congestion was relieved.

=== School trippers ===
When school is in session, two extra buses originate at 179th Street at 2:47 and 2:52, near P.S. 095 Eastwood. Another two begin at I.S. 238 Susan B. Anthony Academy at 182nd Place, departing at 2:55 and 3:22, respectively. All four trips head toward JFK Airport, terminating at Rockaway Boulevard.

== History ==
=== Early history ===
The Saint Albans Improvement Association obtained a permit to operate a bus line between St. Albans and Jamaica, Queens, around 1920. The association hired Mortimer Randel to operate the line. The route was put under the supervision of the New York City Department of Plant & Structures, which established the Saint Albans–Hollis–Jamaica line in March 1922. The route ran from Saint Marks Avenue (now 119th Avenue), via Farmers Avenue, Seminole Avenue and Villard Avenue (both now 190th Street), and Hillside Avenue to Union Hall Street. Because the majority of the route ran via Farmers Boulevard, it was known as the Farmers Boulevard Line.

The Hillside Avenue-Farmers Blvd bus was transferred to Bee Line Bus Incorporated in 1923 and was labeled the Q3. The Q3 route originated from 163rd Street and Jamaica Avenue in the Jamaica business district; the route then ran along 165th Street, Hillside Avenue, 187th Place, and Farmers Avenue, terminating at the intersection of Farmers Avenue and Merrick Road. On October 1, 1930, the Bee Line routes began terminating at the newly constructed Jamaica Union Bus Terminal near its former terminus. The new bus terminal was located at Jamaica Avenue and New York Boulevard (now Guy R. Brewer Boulevard), adjacent to the now-closed Union Hall Street Long Island Rail Road station.

On August 11, 1936, the Bee-Line routes were moved to the newly opened 165th Street Bus Terminal (then the Long Island Bus Terminal). In May 1939, Bee-Line relinquished its Queens routes. The bus was assumed by the North Shore Bus Company on May 22, 1939. These routes began operation from the terminal under North Shore Bus Company on June 25, 1939, as part of the company's takeover of nearly all routes in Zone D (Jamaica and Southeast Queens). The route was extended to Rockaway Boulevard on July 1, 1939. The route was cut back to the 165th Street Bus Terminal from 163rd Street and Jamaica Avenue on October 27, 1939.

=== NYCBOT and NYCTA operation ===
On March 30, 1947, North Shore Bus would be taken over by the New York City Board of Transportation (NYCBOT; later the New York City Transit Authority or NYCTA), making the bus route city operated.

Q3 service was extended from Rockaway Boulevard to JFK International Airport on December 6, 1987. Prior to the extension, the Q3 only operated during weekday morning and evening peak periods. However, once the route was extended, the route was expanded to 21 hours per day, 7 days a week. This extension was not designed for air travelers, as evident by the route's roundabout routing, but it was instead intended for airport employees, those at JFK Airport. In the areas of southeast Queens where the Q3 operates, there is a high concentration of airport workers, and before the extension, they had no direct access via public transportation. The headways during peak-periods were shortened from 20–25 minutes to 15 minutes, and new midday, evening, and weekend service was provided every 30 minutes. The new extensions, was extensively advertised through the use of brochures and timetables, which were the first for a local bus in Queens. These were distributed by the Port Authority of New York and New Jersey to its employees at JFK, and articles were written about the extension in airport newspapers and newsletters. All households in southeast Queens got mailings. A special inaugural bus with local dignitaries ran on December 6, 1987, with a celebration at JFK. Additional service was added to the route because of increased patronage of the route. A majority of the people who started using the Q3 to get to the airport previously to travel by car.

24-hour service was added to the Q3 on April 11, 2004. At the same time, service to all JFK terminals except Terminal 4 was replaced by AirTrain JFK. The route's JFK Terminus was moved to Terminal 5 on May 30, 2012, due to construction at Terminal 4.

=== Bus redesigns ===
In December 2019, the MTA released a draft redesign of the Queens bus network. As part of the redesign, the Q3 would have been replaced by a "neighborhood" bus route, the QT68, which would have been extended south to Federal Circle and north to Jamaica Hospital. The redesign was delayed due to the COVID-19 pandemic in New York City in 2020, and the original draft plan was dropped due to negative feedback.

A revised plan was released in March 2022. Shortly before the announcement of the bus redesign, the Q3 was extended southwest to the AirTrain JFK's Lefferts Boulevard station to accommodate long-term construction at JFK Airport on March 27, 2022. The changes would remain in effect until at least 2026, when JFK's new Central Terminal Area was completed. The new draft plan also called for the Q3 to be extended to the Lefferts Boulevard station. Therefore, no further changes to the Q3 would need to be made in the bus redesign, other than the elimination of closely spaced stops.

A final bus-redesign plan was released in December 2023. Under this plan, the Q3's extension to the Lefferts Boulevard station would be made permanent.

On December 17, 2024, addendums to the final plan were released. Among these, stop changes were made to the Q3 to account for the Port Authority redevelopment project, which may affect the routing as the development proceeds. On January 29, 2025, the current plan was approved by the MTA Board, and the Queens Bus Redesign went into effect in two different phases during Summer 2025. The Q3 is part of Phase I, which started on June 29, 2025.

== See also ==
- North Shore Bus Company
