= Cedar Manor station =

Train station in New York City (1906–59)

Cedar Manor

General information
- Location: Linden Boulevard and Dillon Street; South Jamaica, Queens, New York City
- Coordinates: 40.688695°N 73.787013°W
- Owner: Long Island Rail Road
- Line: Atlantic Branch
- Platforms: 2 side platforms
- Tracks: 2

Other information
- Station code: None
- Fare zone: 3

History
- Opened: 1906
- Closed: 1959

Former services
Preceding station	Long Island Rail Road	Following station
Jamaica toward Flatbush Avenue	Atlantic Division	Locust Manor toward Valley Stream
Location

Cedar Manor, originally named Power Place was a railroad station along the Atlantic Branch of the Long Island Rail Road, in South Jamaica, in the New York City borough of Queens.

== History ==
The station opened as a small one-story frame station here in 1906, east of the track and north of what was then called Power Place, which was later renamed 114th Avenue, and finally renamed Linden Boulevard. Cedar Manor was a real estate development covering the neighborhood generally west and north of the crossing of the LIRR with New York Boulevard. Before World War I, it was a signal stop only.

In 1948, the White Engineering Corporation completed a three-volume study for the Pennsylvania Railroad on how to save the Long Island Rail Road from bankruptcy and how to make it self-sufficient. This study, which was made public in August 1949, made several recommendations, including the abandonment of eleven LIRR stations to save $96,000, of which three (Atlantic Avenue, Inwood, and Merillon Avenue) were in Nassau County, and eight were in Queens, including Hamilton Beach, the Raunt, Elmhurst, Corona, Higbie Avenue, and Cedar Manor.

In 1949, the Long Island Rail Road (LIRR) requested permission from the New York State Public Service Commission (PSC) to discontinue this and Higbie Avenue station to reduce the cost of its planned project to eliminate grade crossings on the Atlantic Branch between Springfield Boulevard and South Road. The PSC ordered the LIRR to construct twelve-car long high-level side platforms at both stations, along with shelters. The PSC had determined that ridership at the two stations was high enough to require their continuation.

In 1955, the LIRR again requested permission from the PSC to discontinue this and Higbie Avenue station. The LIRR claimed that while total ridership at the two stations was 15,000 and 28,400 in July 1949, respectively, ridership decreased by 70 percent at Cedar Manor, and by 60 at Higbie Avenue. At a PSC hearing, a passenger representative of the LIRR said that alternate means of transportation from the two stations to Jamaica and Penn Station would only take ten minutes longer.

On July 22, 1955, the PSC allowed the LIRR to close this station, but not the Higbie Avenue station. The PSC found that alternate transportation was available at Cedar Manor in the form of bus service, while there was none at Higbie Avenue. Cedar Manor was ordered to stay open until the temporary tracks for the grade crossing elimination project were installed. The LIRR had stated that ridership had significantly declined at the two stations in recent years and that closing them would save $350,000.

The station closed on January 28, 1959 and the building was razed in February 1959 as part of the grade crossing elimination project, and was ultimately discontinued as a station stop.
