= Bartlett's station =

Former train station in New York, US

Bartlett's

General information
- Location: Bellport Avenue; Yaphank, New York
- Coordinates: 40.821111°N 72.956667°W
- Owner: LIRR
- Platforms: 2
- Tracks: 2

History
- Opened: 1844
- Closed: 1880
- Former names: Bellport
Location

Bartlett's was a private flag stop on the Long Island Rail Road's Main Line, that opened under the name Bellport in 1844 with the opening of the LIRR. Located 2 1/2 miles (4.0 km) east of Medford station and thus much further north than Bellport, it included a stagecoach connection down Bellport (Station) Road to Bellport Village, hence the station's name.

== History ==
The station is mentioned in 1852 in the New York Traveller. This station appears on the 1852 timetable and on a map from 1873 as Bellport (Also on this map the Manorville Branch, the Main Line and the proposed SSRRLI right of way past Patchogue to meet with the Manorville Branch). This station was renamed "Bartlett's Station" on May 21, 1880 after NYS Court of Appeals Justice Willard Bartlett, whose father had purchased a farm in Brookhaven, then an estate of over 1000-acres. The station was abandoned at some point. The stop was a private flag-stop, which eventually was closed.
