= Stewart Manor station =

Long Island Rail Road station in Nassau County, New York

Stewart Manor
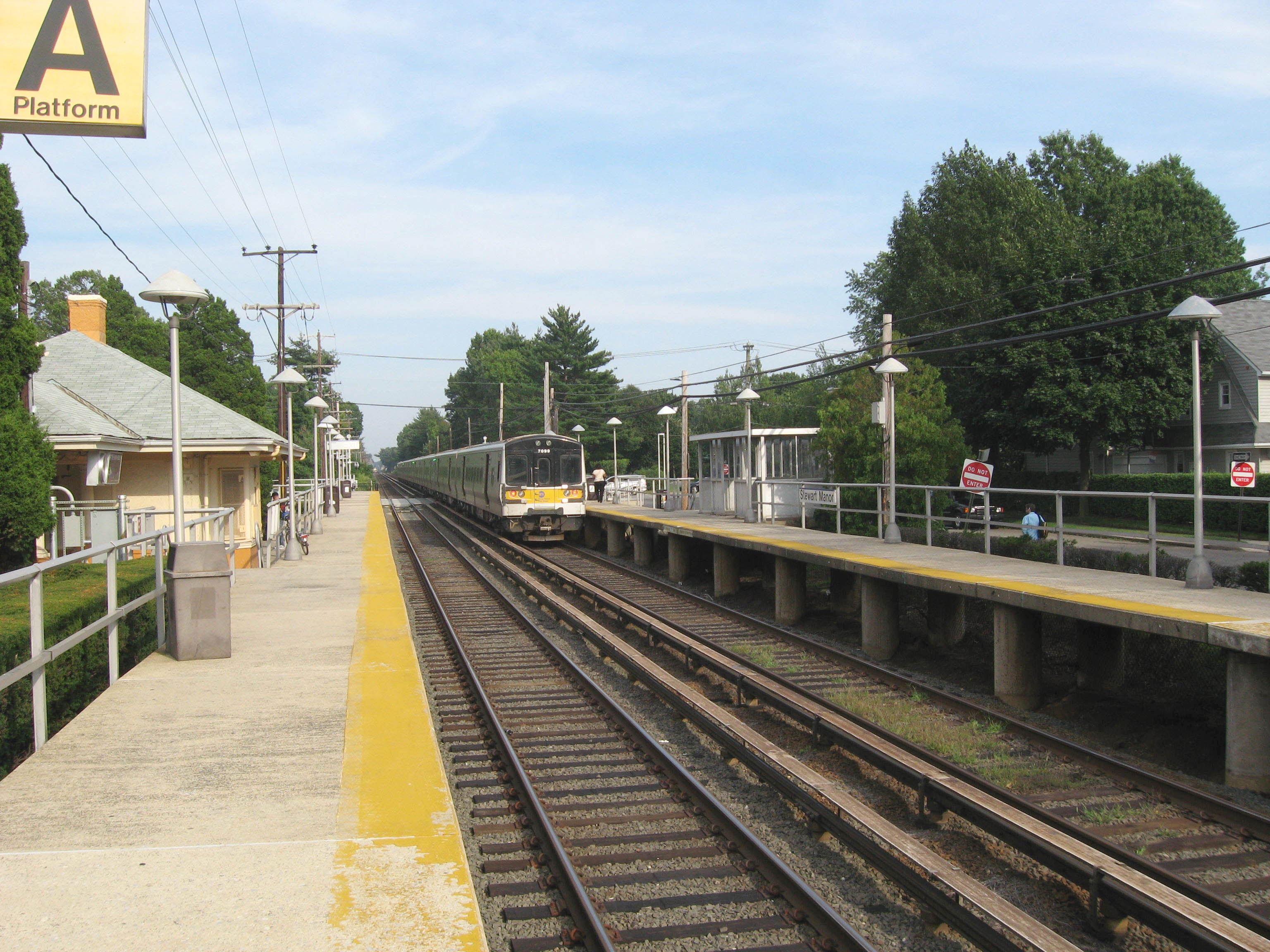
- Eastbound train pulling out of the station, seen prior to its renovations

General information
- Location: New Hyde Park Road & Manor Road; Garden City, New York
- Coordinates: 40.723006°N 73.68114°W
- Owner: Long Island Rail Road
- Line: Hempstead Branch
- Distance: 16.3 mi (26.2 km) from Long Island City
- Platforms: 2 side platforms
- Tracks: 2
- Connections: Nassau Inter-County Express: n25

Construction
- Parking: Yes
- Accessible: Yes

Other information
- Station code: SMR
- Fare zone: 4

History
- Opened: 1873 (CRRLI)
- Rebuilt: 1909, 2006
- Electrified: May 26, 1908; 750 V (DC) third rail
- Former names: Hyde Park (1873–1876), Hyde Park Central (1878–1879)

Passengers
- 2012–2014: 1,654 per weekday

Services
Preceding station	Long Island Rail Road	Following station
Floral Park toward Penn Station, Grand Central or Atlantic Terminal	Hempstead Branch	Nassau Boulevard toward Hempstead
Location

The Stewart Manor station is a train station on the Hempstead Branch of Long Island Rail Road located at the corner of New Hyde Park Road and Manor Road in Garden City, New York. Contrary to its name, the station is not within the village of Stewart Manor – the west end of the station is one block east of its boundary with Garden City.

== History ==
Originally, the station was built in June 1873 as "Hyde Park", and served as one of the stations of the Central Railroad of Long Island, or "Stewart's Central Railroad", a commuter railroad that village founder Alexander Turney Stewart envisioned to provide transportation access to the village. The station closed in October 1876, but was reopened by the LIRR in June 1878 as "Hyde Park Central" station, only to be abandoned on April 30, 1879. The station was reopened again as "Stewart Manor Station" in 1909, and included such features as a "foot subway", crossing gates at New Hyde Park Road, and an "SW Cabin" for controlling manual block signals between Floral Park and Garden City. In 1915, the station was a flag stop. The entrances to the "foot subway" which can be found east of Roosevelt Street on both Manor Road and Plaza Road, were remodeled at some point, and the station in general was remodeled in 2006. There is a ticket machine available in the waiting room as well as on the east side of the station house.

On August 31, 2016, the station house temporarily closed for renovations. The renovations included new windows, doors, walls, benches, a new ceiling, as well as new LED lighting, air conditioning, and security cameras. The renovation also included the complete rehabilitation of the underpass and the installation of new station signage. After the new station house was completed in 2018, the Stewart Manor station underwent further renovations as part of the Enhanced Station Initiative. The platform decks were replaced as part of the project. Other updates included Wi-Fi, security cameras, improved lighting, new artwork, and Help Point intercoms.

== Station layout ==
This station has two high-level side platforms, each 10 cars long.

== Image gallery ==
Stewart Manor station

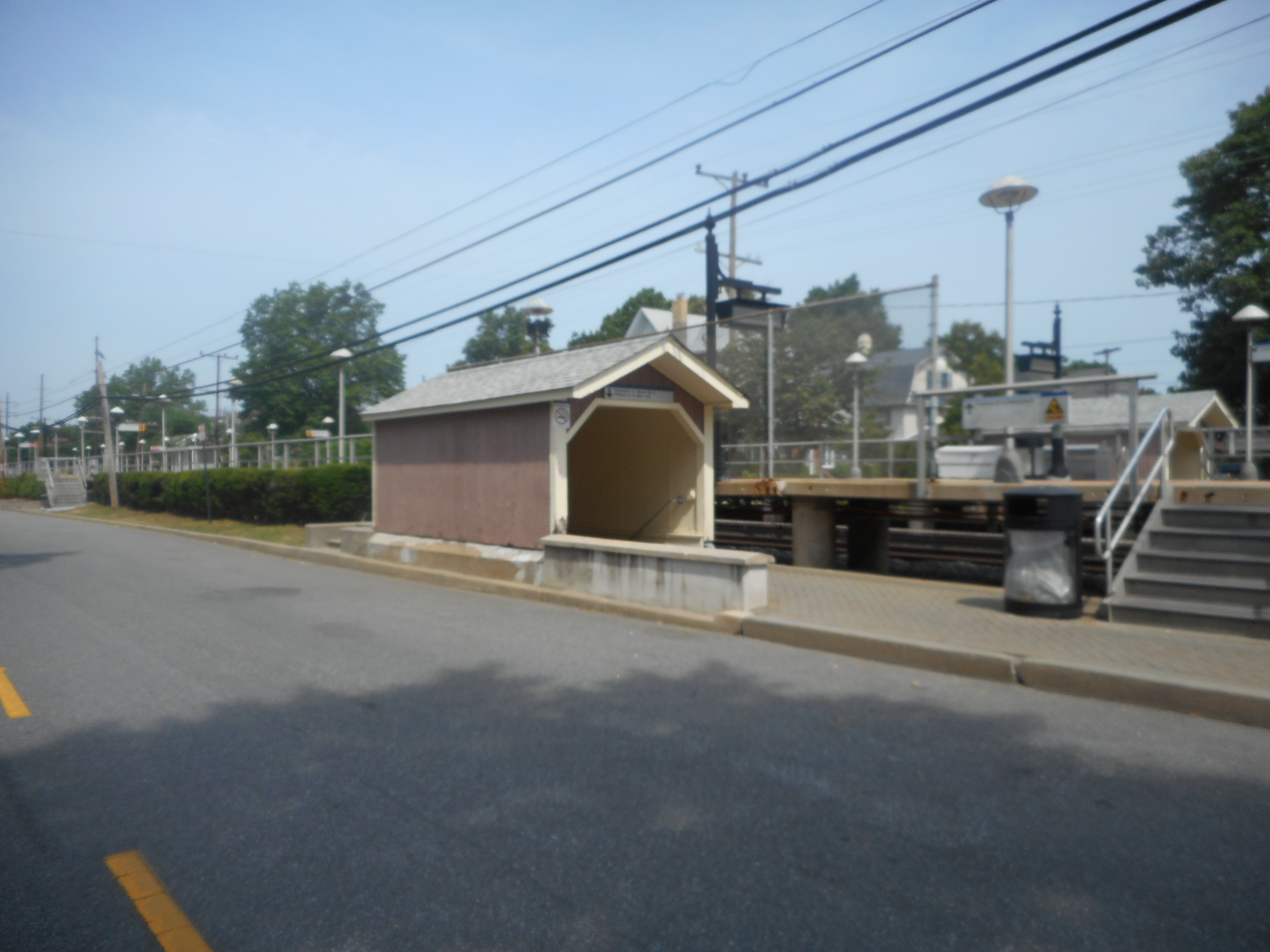
An entrance to the pedestrian tunnel along Plaza Road.

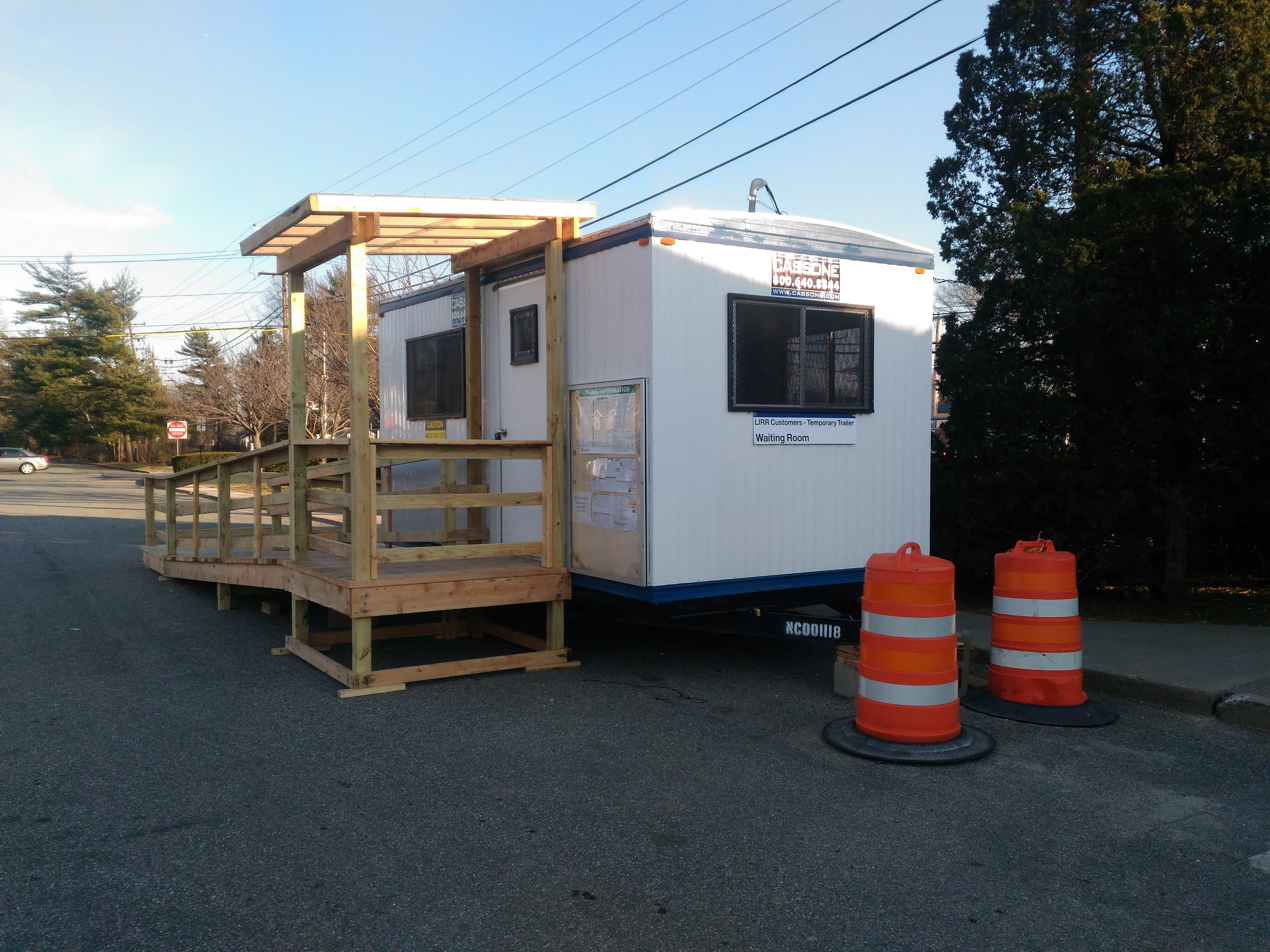
Exterior of the temporary waiting room.

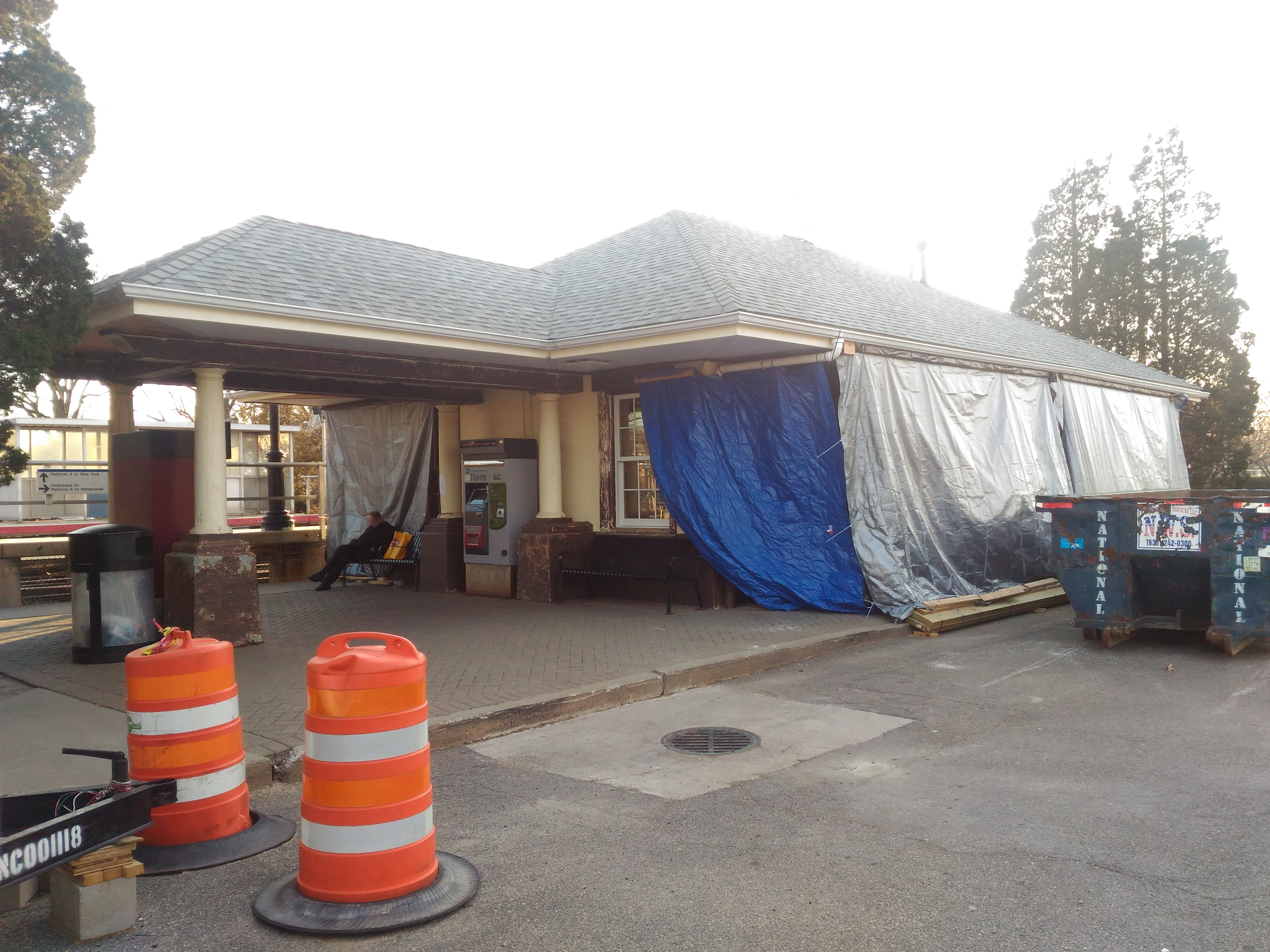
Station house under reconstruction, as seen on February 6, 2017.
