= Montauk Cutoff =

Abandoned rail line in New York City

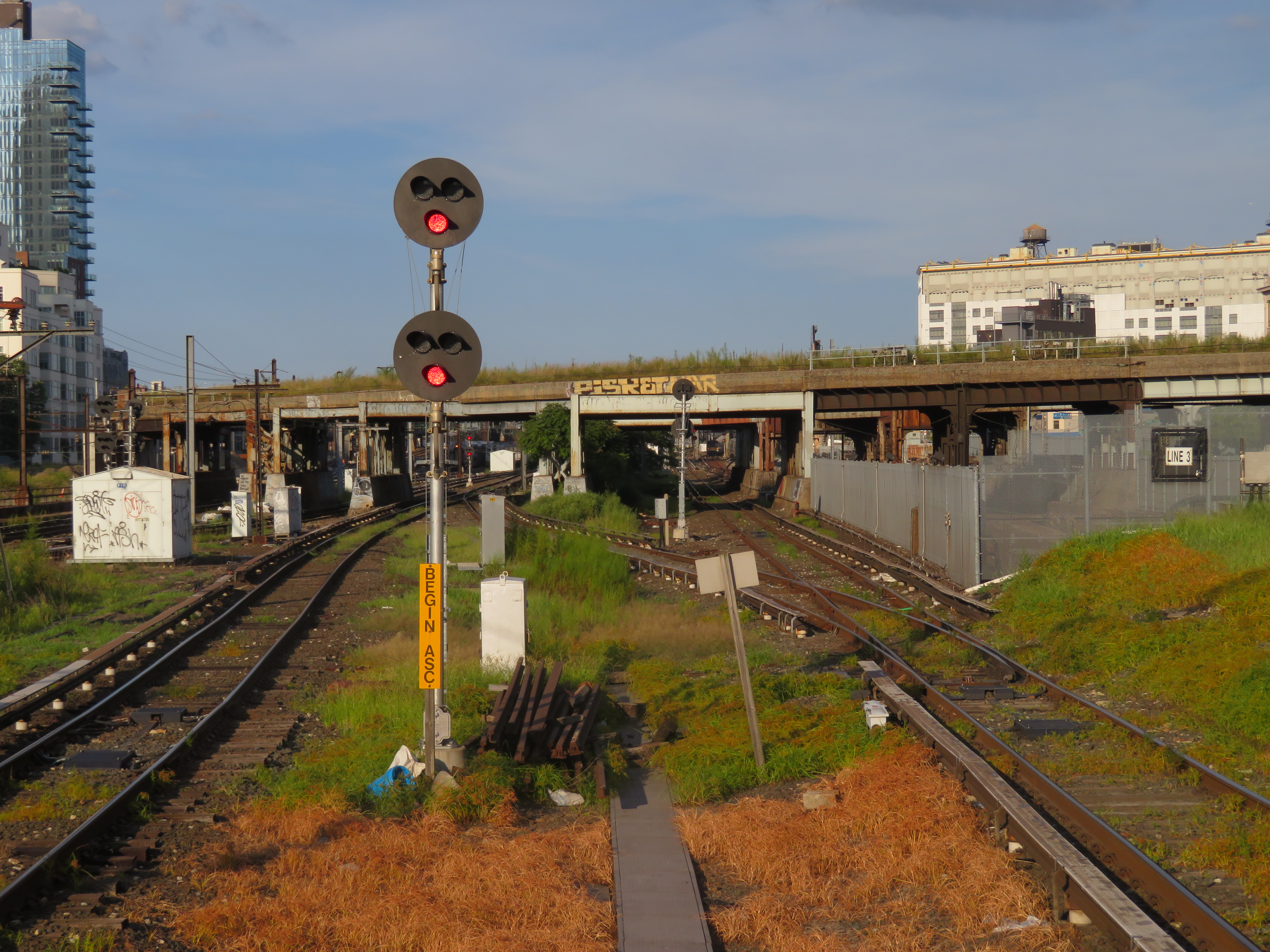
- Montauk Cutoff overpass between Skillman Avenue and Sunnyside Yard

Overview
- Status: Abandoned
- Owner: Metropolitan Transportation Authority
- Termini: Sunnyside Yard; Blissville Yard
- Stations: 0

Technical
- Num of tracks: 2–3
- Track gauge: 1,435 mm (4 ft 8 1/2 in) standard gauge

The Montauk Cutoff is an abandoned railway in Long Island City, Queens, New York City, that connected the Long Island Rail Road's Main Line and Lower Montauk Branch.

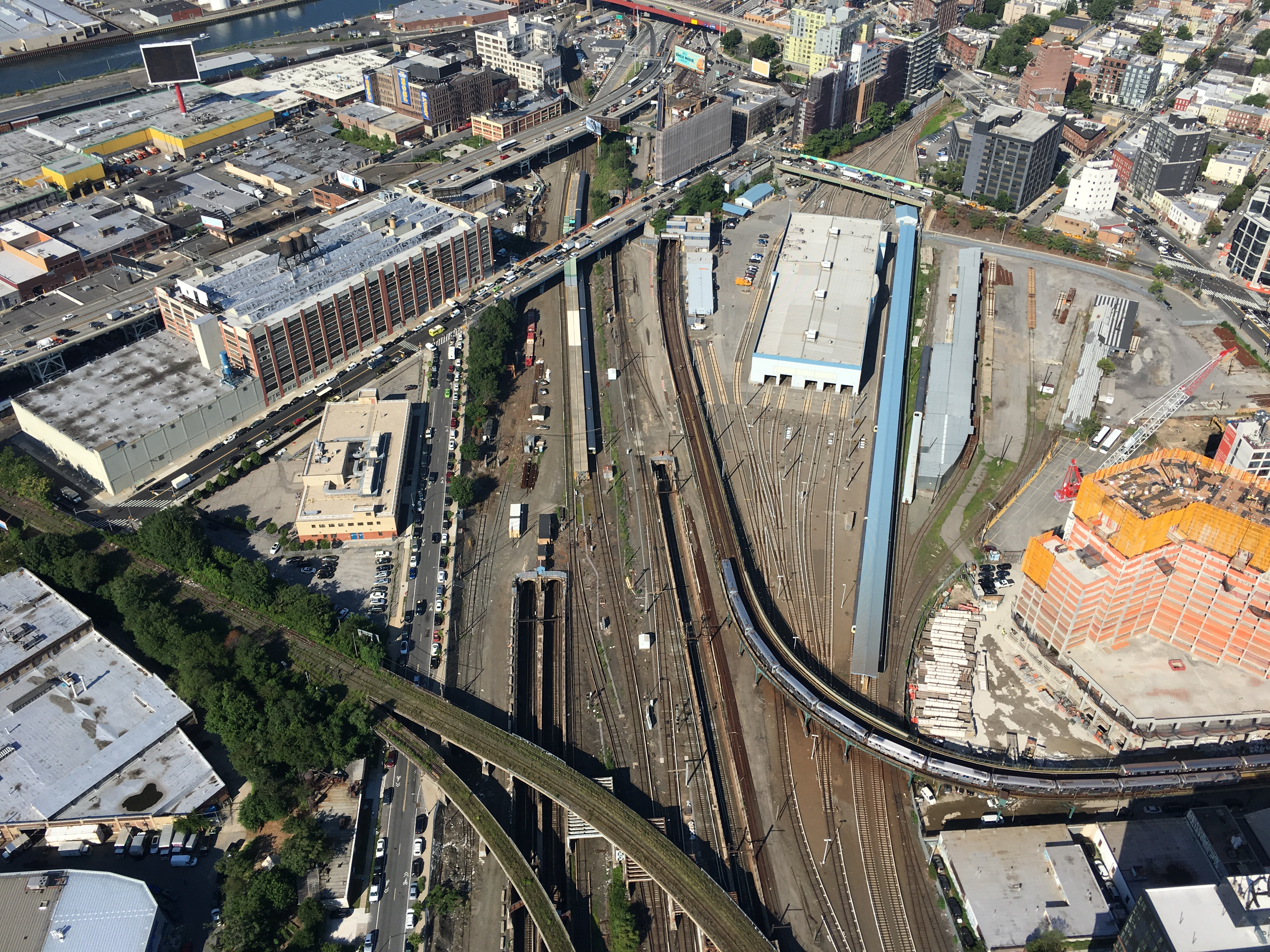
Helicopter view of Long Island City. The overgrown Montauk Cutoff is visible at the bottom left.

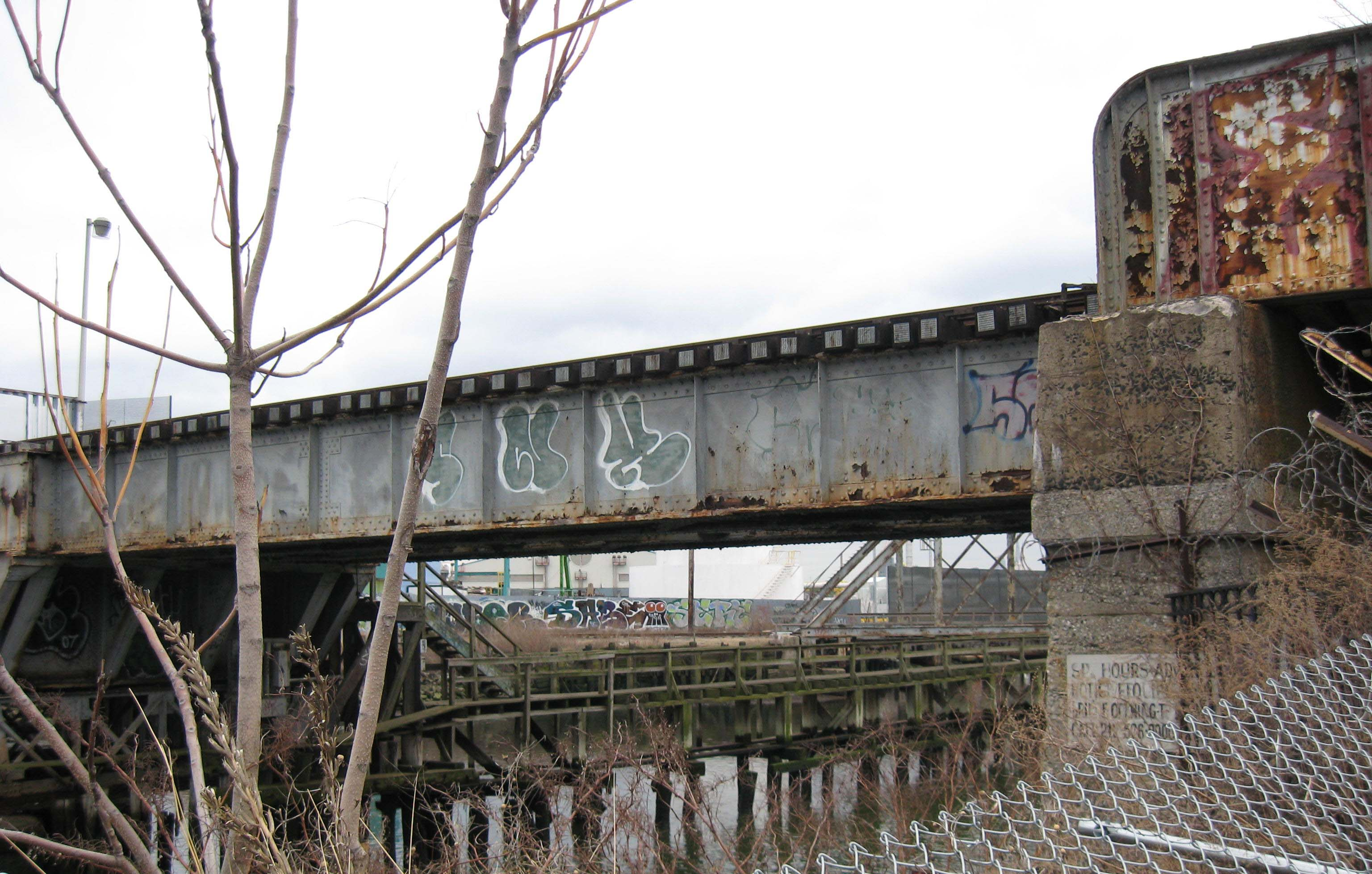
Cabin M bridge

The Montauk Cutoff is a cutoff approximately one-third of a mile in length and was double-tracked for its entire length. It begins just west of Sunnyside and Arch Street Yards (40.744°N 73.943°W), after which it runs west parallel to Skillman Avenue and passes over the tracks leading to the East River Tunnels and Hunterspoint Avenue. It then runs elevated across several blocks in an industrial section of Long Island City, before crossing the Cabin M Bridge (40.739°N 73.9442°W)—a single-bascule bridge over Dutch Kills—and meeting the Montauk Branch immediately to the east of Dutch Kills Bridge at Blissville Yard (40.737°N 73.942°W).

== History of operation ==
The Montauk Cutoff was first proposed in early 1906 and received a charter for construction in 1907, and was opened in July 1910 at a cost of $1,000,000 (equivalent to $34,553,571 in 2025). It was originally constructed to allow trains from the Montauk Branch to directly access Sunnyside Yard, which was opened by the Pennsylvania Railroad in 1910. As a flying junction, the Montauk Cutoff also allowed efficient transport of freight by separating it from the tracks leading to the also newly constructed East River Tunnels, which carry passenger trains to and from Manhattan. Following its opening, the Montauk Cutoff was primarily used by freight trains. It was constructed contemporaneously with other freight connections in Queens, including the Hell Gate Line (which now also sees Amtrak passenger service) and Glendale Cutoff.

On weekdays, the Montauk Cutoff was also used in lieu of a turntable (in essence, as a wye track) to turn diesel locomotives in Long Island City – then the main terminus for non-electric trains, of which most freight was restricted from using the East River Tunnels (Railway Express Agency, and perishables used the North River and East River tunnels to expedite shipments and avoid both carfloating and the Selkirk Hurdle) and Penn Station. As there was no turntable at Long Island City, west-facing locomotives from westbound trains would run around the cutoff after the trains discharged their passengers; the turned locomotives could then pull eastbound trains later in the day.

In the late 1990s, this practice was discontinued, as the LIRR's new diesel equipment (EMD DE30AC and DM30AC locomotives and C3 coaches) included cab cars, which enable remote control of the locomotive from the opposite end of the train and eliminate the need to turn locomotives in daily operations. Between the 1970s and 1990s, freight traffic into Long Island City also decreased, and in the 1990s, the MTA ceased freight operations with the sale of the LIRR's freight division to the New York and Atlantic Railway. As a result, the Montauk Cutoff saw less use and began to fall into disrepair.

== Abandonment and possible reuse ==
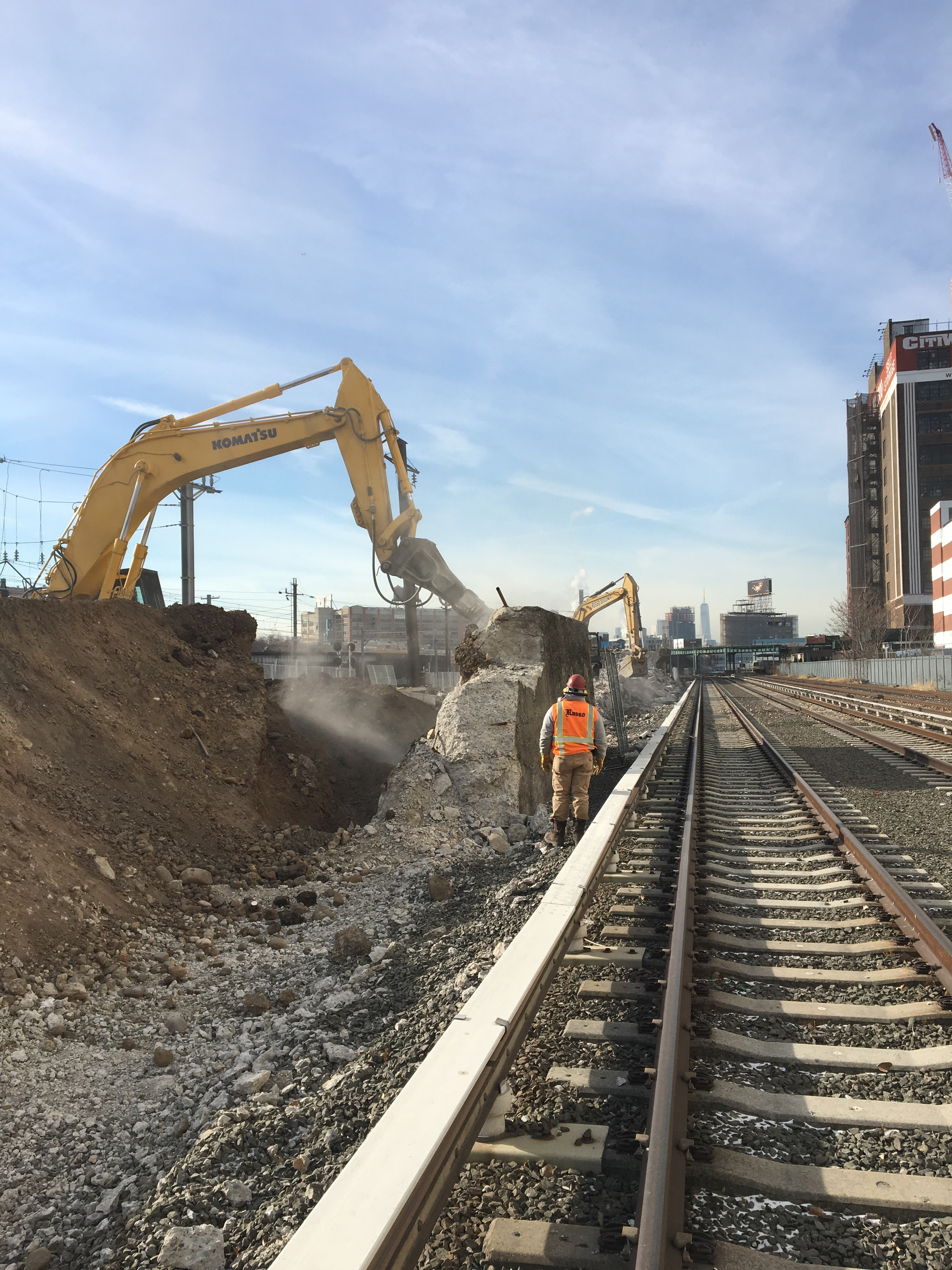
Partial demolition underway in 2018

The MTA has not used the Montauk Cutoff since its freight operations ended and the replacement of its diesel fleet—between 1989 and the late 1990s. Since then, the right-of-way has been overgrown and has seen graffiti, trespassers, homeless camps, and guerrilla gardening. In 2013, some local residents obtained a lease from the MTA to use a part of the abandoned right-of-way as a community garden known as the Smiling Hogshead Ranch. The garden was first conceived in 2011 as a guerrilla garden on the Degnon Terminal tracks, which split from the Montauk Cutoff. As of 2024, it is still operative.

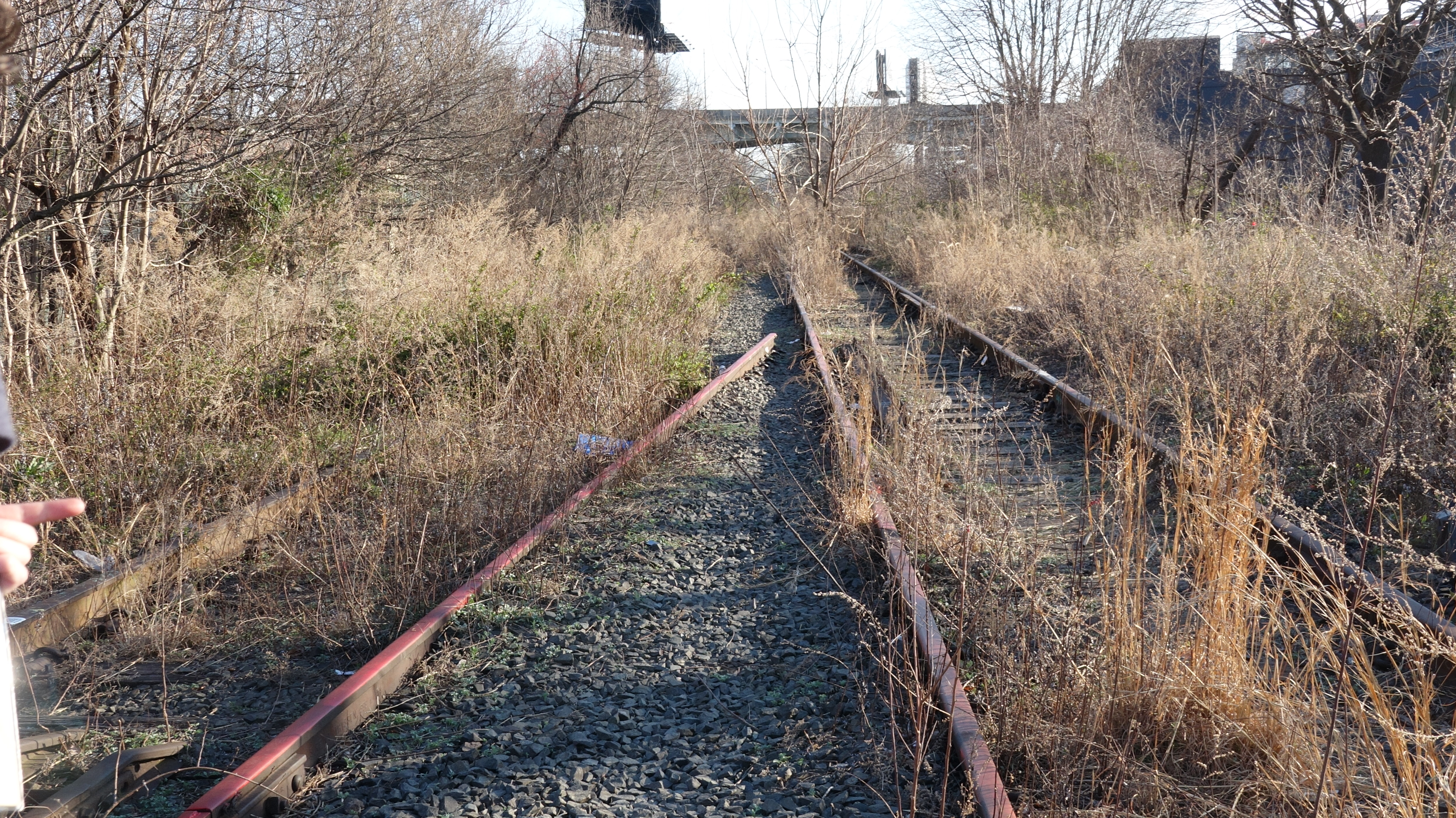
The Montauk Cutoff splitting from two to three tracks.

In 2015, the MTA announced that it was decommissioning the Montauk Cutoff. It also announced that it was seeking concepts for reuse of the right-of-way. Some potential uses include an expanded garden, urban farm, or a park resembling the High Line in Manhattan, though the MTA announced that it does not want to sell the structure, as it wants to keep open the possibility of reuse as transportation infrastructure. A part of the Montauk Cutoff was later demolished to expand yard space for the East Side Access project.

== See also ==
- Rockaway Beach Branch
- Bay Ridge Branch
