= Smiling Hogshead Ranch =

Community garden in New York City

Coordinates: 40°44′35″N 73°56′36″W

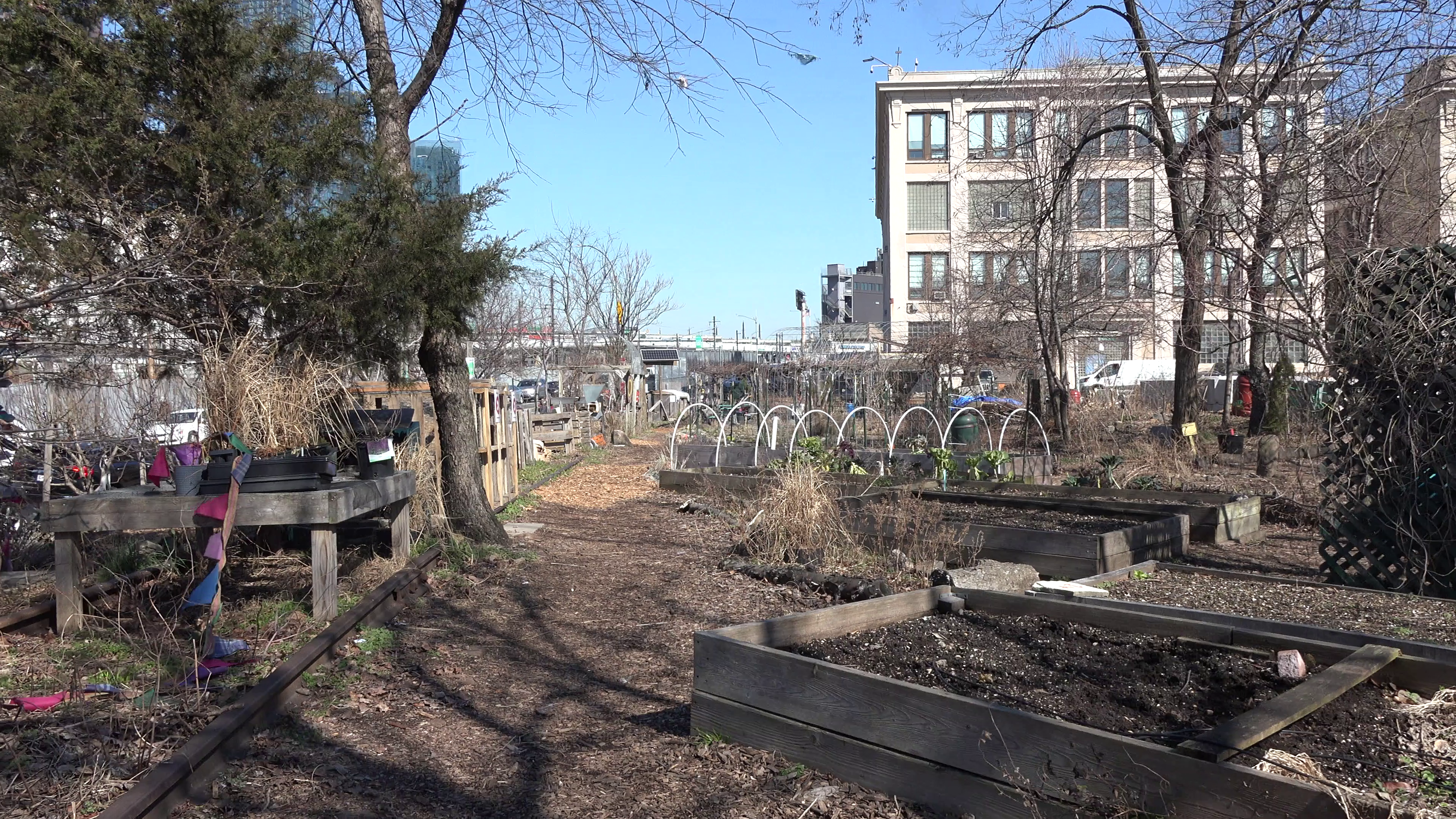
Smiling Hogshead Ranch

Smiling Hogshead Ranch (SHR) is a community garden located in Long Island City in New York City. It was originally a guerilla garden on the abandoned tracks for the Degnon Terminal tracks, a spur off the Montauk Cutoff. Originally formed in 2011 by Gil Lopez, It is located on Skillman Avenue.

== History ==
In 2011, Gil Lopez and four friends discovered the Degnon spur, deciding to start a community garden on the abandoned tracks due to its size, lack of fence or signage. The group originally began farming at night to avoid discovery by the MTA but in 2014 entered into an agreement with the MTA to lease the space for gardening when it became clear the farm deterred sex workers and homeless encampments on the tracks.

In 2015, the MTA put out a Request For Expressions of Interest (RFEI) for the adaptive reuse of the Montauk Cutoff in a similar vein as the High Line. Garden organizers, community members and activists formed the Cutoff Coalition to put together a proposal that continues using the cutoff for the community. The group's proposal, known as the Dutch Kills Loop, was the leading proposal of the space. It proposed a 1.4 mile circuit of public walkways to link bridges, and park spaces to a restored Dutch Kills inlet and featured environmental restoration, public access, and connection to waterways.

In November 2024, the MTA issued an eviction notice for the community garden, which was believed to be a result of migrants and asylum seekers using the park at night during the citywide migrant housing crisis. Use of the garden by migrants and asylum seekers started in May 2024 when the city began enforcing 30- and 60-day limits on stays in shelters. The MTA rescinded the notice when the garden agreed to post up signs prohibiting entering after dark, among other things, but use of the garden for housing is still an ongoing problem.

== Operations ==
Smiling Hogshead Ranch operates as an urban farm collective that cultivates various crops, maintains a compost operation that includes windrows, an apiary, feral cat colony, and an amphitheater. Volunteers often work with students from around the five boroughs as they visit the SHR on educational field trips. The cultivation of the land utilizes safe growing practices for reclaiming industrial land high in heavy metals. It receives help from the New York City Park Department's GreenThumb program.

Unlike other community gardens in New York City, the garden is not fenced in, allowing it to act as public commons for the community. However, the garden is subject to crop theft, vandalism, truant students, and drug users that volunteers must contend with. The group believes that reclaiming the commons is vital to urban infrastructure, allowing the community to organize and actively manage the land.
