= East Side Access =

Rail construction project in New York City

- Interactive map Red and blue: new tunnels. Green: existing 63rd Street Tunnel. Points denote new stations.

Overview
- Status: Full service
- Owner: Metropolitan Transportation Authority
- Locale: New York City
- Termini: Sunnyside Yard/Harold Interlocking (Queens); Grand Central Madison (Manhattan)
- Stations: 2
- Website: Official website

Service
- Type: Commuter rail
- System: Long Island Rail Road
- Services: City Terminal Zone
- Operator: MTA Long Island Rail Road
- Ridership: 162,000 daily (projected)

History
- Work began: September 2007
- Opened: January 25, 2023

Technical
- Line length: 2 mi (3.2 km)
- Track length: 6.1 mi (9.8 km)
- Num of tracks: 2–8
- Character: Underground
- Track gauge: 4 ft 8 1/2 in (1,435 mm) standard gauge
- Electrification: Third rail, 750 V DC

East Side Access (ESA) is a completed public works project in New York City that extended the Long Island Rail Road (LIRR) two miles from its Main Line in Queens to the new Grand Central Madison station under Grand Central Terminal on Manhattan's East Side. Previously, the only Manhattan stop for trains from Long Island was Pennsylvania Station, on the west side of the island. The new station and tunnels opened with limited service to Jamaica station in Queens on January 25, 2023, before full service began the following month, on February 27. Built by the Metropolitan Transportation Authority (MTA), the project was originally scheduled to open in 2009 but was delayed by more than a decade. The estimated cost of the project rose over threefold from US$3.5 billion to US$11.1 billion as of April 2018, making it one of the world's most expensive underground rail-construction projects.

The new LIRR terminal contains eight tracks and four platforms in a two-level station 100 feet (30.5 m) below street level. It was built in conjunction with several other LIRR expansion projects, including the construction of a third track along the Main Line between Floral Park and Hicksville. The project was intended to remove or reduce the need for subway transfers for a large number of riders with jobs on the east side of Manhattan.

East Side Access was based on transit plans from the 1950s, though an LIRR terminal on Manhattan's East Side was first proposed in 1963. The planned LIRR line was included in the 1968 Program for Action of transit improvements in the New York City area. Lack of funds prevented the construction of any part of the connection other than the 63rd Street Tunnel under the East River. Plans for the LIRR connection were revived in the late 1990s. The project received federal funding in 2006, and construction began the following year. The tunnels on the Manhattan side were dug from 2007 to 2011, and the connecting tunnels on the Queens side were completed in 2012. Afterward, work began on other facilities related to the line, such as new platforms at Grand Central, ventilation and ancillary buildings, communication and utility systems, and supporting rail infrastructure in Queens. The project's completion was delayed several times during construction.

== History ==
=== Origins ===
The East Side Access project was based on regional planning proposals that were first brought up in the 1950s. In March 1954, the New York City Transit Authority (NYCTA) issued a $658 million construction program. The proposal included a tunnel for the Second Avenue Subway, which would cross the East River between 76th Street in Manhattan and Astoria in Queens before continuing onto the Long Island Rail Road (LIRR)'s Main Line in Queens. The 76th Street tunnel proposal resurfaced in 1963, though the location of the tunnel was changed several times thereafter. In 1965, the NYCTA finally decided to build the subway tunnel at 63rd Street.

The first proposals to bring LIRR service to a terminal in eastern Midtown Manhattan arose in 1963. To facilitate planning for this terminal, a third track was added to the plans for the 63rd Street subway tunnel in April 1966. The track would serve LIRR trains to east Midtown, alleviating train traffic into Penn Station on Manhattan's west side while integrating the LIRR with the subway. A fourth track was added to the plans in August 1966 after it was determined that LIRR trains would be too large to run on subway tracks. This amendment increased the number of LIRR tracks to two, and provided segregated tracks for the LIRR and the subway.

In February 1968, the NYCTA's parent company, the Metropolitan Transportation Authority (MTA), released the Program for Action, which proposed numerous improvements to subway, railway, and airport service in the New York metropolitan area. The plan included a new LIRR terminal at a proposed Metropolitan Transportation Center at Third Avenue and 48th Street in East Midtown. It also included connections to Grand Central Terminal, with a new northern entrance leading to the center, and the Second Avenue Subway, among other transit services. The new LIRR line was to branch off from existing lines in Sunnyside, Queens, and enter Manhattan using the new two-level 63rd Street Tunnel. The upper level was to be used by the New York City Subway's 63rd Street lines and the lower level was to be used by the LIRR. According to renderings of the transportation center, the mezzanine would be placed above four island platforms and eight tracks, which would be split evenly across two levels, similar to the present terminal under Grand Central.

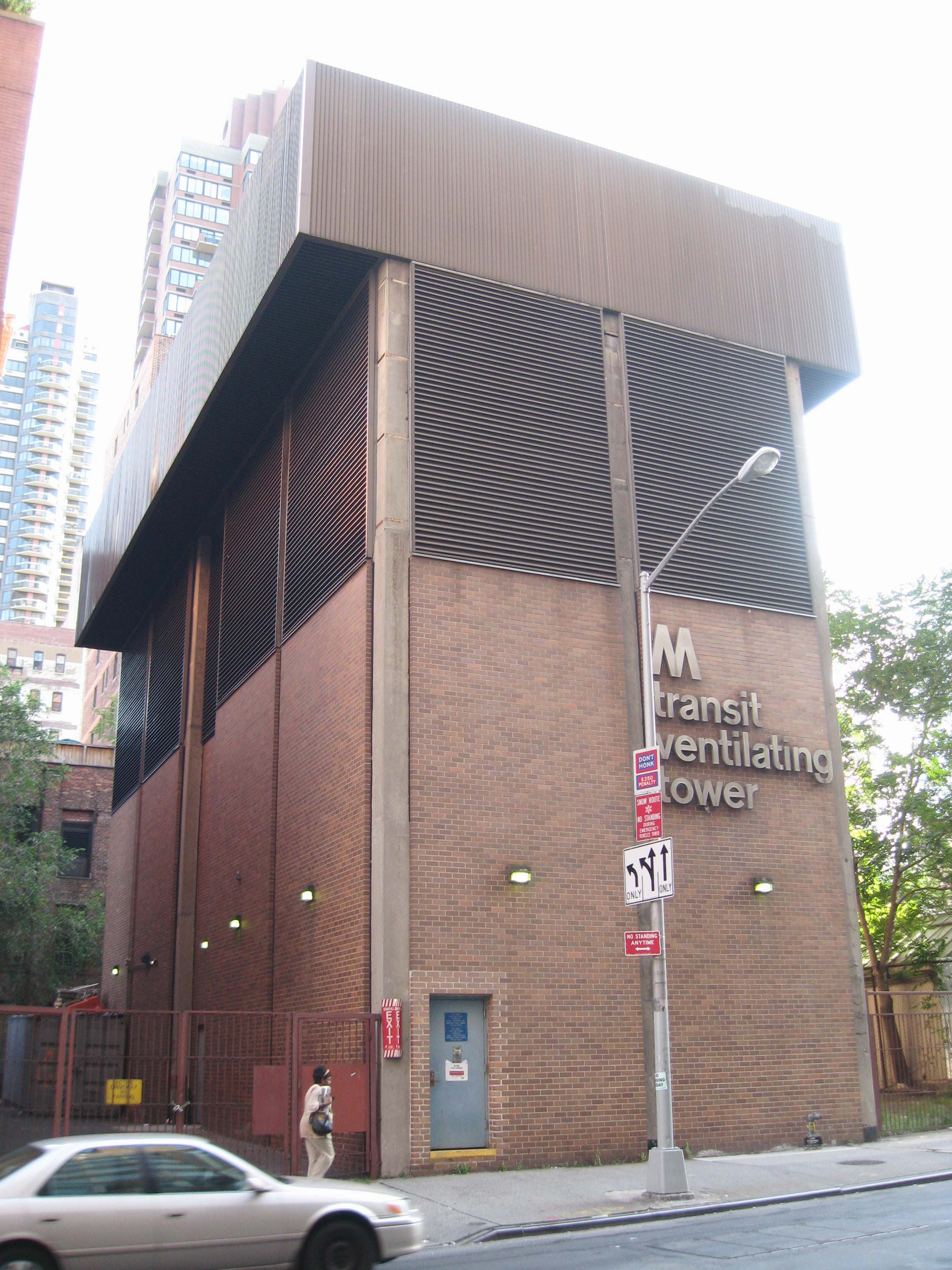
A ventilation tower for the 63rd Street Tunnel

Construction on the project began in 1969. Four 38-foot-square (12 m) prefabricated sections of the 63rd Street Tunnel were constructed in Delaware and towed the East River, the first of which was delivered in May 1971. That first section was lowered into place on August 29, 1971, and the last section was lowered on March 14, 1972. The double-deck, 3,140-foot (960 m) tunnel under the East River was "holed through" on October 10, 1972, with the separate sections of tunnels being connected. The estimated cost of the project was $341 million, and the MTA applied for $227 million in Federal funds.

Plans to build the Manhattan terminal in the Turtle Bay neighborhood were opposed by residents who feared it would change the neighborhood and bring traffic congestion; they suggested it be built at Grand Central instead. MTA officials countered that there were too many rail lines at Grand Central, and that adding the LIRR would further strain the Lexington Avenue Line. If it were on Third Avenue, passengers would have been more inclined to use the Second Avenue Subway, which was partially under construction at the time. On April 16, 1973, a Federal directive directed New York State to consider expanding and modernizing Grand Central before building the new terminal under Third Avenue.

Preliminary planning for the Metropolitan Transportation Center had been completed by January 1975. Due to continued opposition to the Transportation Center, a "Grand Central Alternative" was published in September 1976. It called for the LIRR to use Grand Central Terminal's lower level instead. In 1977, the MTA's board of directors voted to use Grand Central as the terminal for the proposed LIRR route.

=== Plans stalled ===
Due to the 1975 New York City fiscal crisis, the LIRR project was canceled long before the tunnel was completed. The New York Times noted that the lower level of the 63rd Street Tunnel was still under construction by 1976, even though "officials knew that the tunnel would never be used." Richard Ravitch, the MTA chairman, said that to stop the work was impossible or so costly as to make it impractical subsequent to the construction of the subway portion." The lower level of the 63rd Street Tunnel was completed along with the upper subway level. The western end of the tunnel lay dormant under Second Avenue at 63rd Street for three decades. By the time that construction on the LIRR tunnel level stopped, the tunnel was built for a distance of 8,600 feet (2,600 m). The 8,600-foot "tunnel to nowhere" was completed "largely for structural reasons – to support the subway tunnel above."

The 63rd Street subway line and LIRR tunnel were completed as far as 29th Street in Long Island City, Queens, with the subway level of the tunnel opening in 1989. The LIRR tunnel remained unused beneath the subway tracks. In 1994, work began to extend the 63rd Street subway tunnel east to connect to the Queens Boulevard subway line; the LIRR tunnel was also extended east, under 41st Avenue in Queens to the west side of Northern Boulevard in Queens. The subway connector was opened to full-time F train service in December 2001.

=== Plans revived ===
Plans were made in 1995 to bring LIRR service to East Midtown, although MTA officials declared that the LIRR East Side connection would not be completed within the next generation. In 1997, U.S. Senator Al D'Amato started asking for federal money to connect the LIRR to Grand Central. New York Governor George Pataki had previously proposed completing the project, but D'Amato's support increased the likelihood that construction would actually begin. At the time, if everything went favorably, the LIRR link could open by 2010. By that time, the LIRR was the busiest commuter railroad in the United States, with an average of 269,400 passengers each weekday in 1999. As of 1998, there were almost 1.77 million jobs in Manhattan, including an increasing number of white-collar "office" jobs in East Midtown. Penn Station on the West Side was operating at capacity due to a complex track interlocking and limited capacity in the East River Tunnels.

In 1999, the MTA proposed a $17 billion five-year capital budget. This budget included a $1.6 billion LIRR connection to Grand Central, as well as several subway extensions. The project's final environmental impact assessment (FEIS) was released in March 2001. (Note: For the full FEIS, see: "East Side Access Final Environmental Impact Statement: Overview". mta.info. Metropolitan Transportation Authority. March 6, 2001.) The FEIS reviewed two key options for bringing LIRR service to Grand Central. The first option was to connect the tunnels to the existing lower level at Grand Central, while the second option was to build an entirely new station underneath it. The MTA ultimately recommended the second option because it was cheaper and less disruptive to Metro-North service. After reviewing the FEIS for two months, the Federal Transit Administration (FTA) gave the project a favorable "Record of Decision"—i.e., approved it.

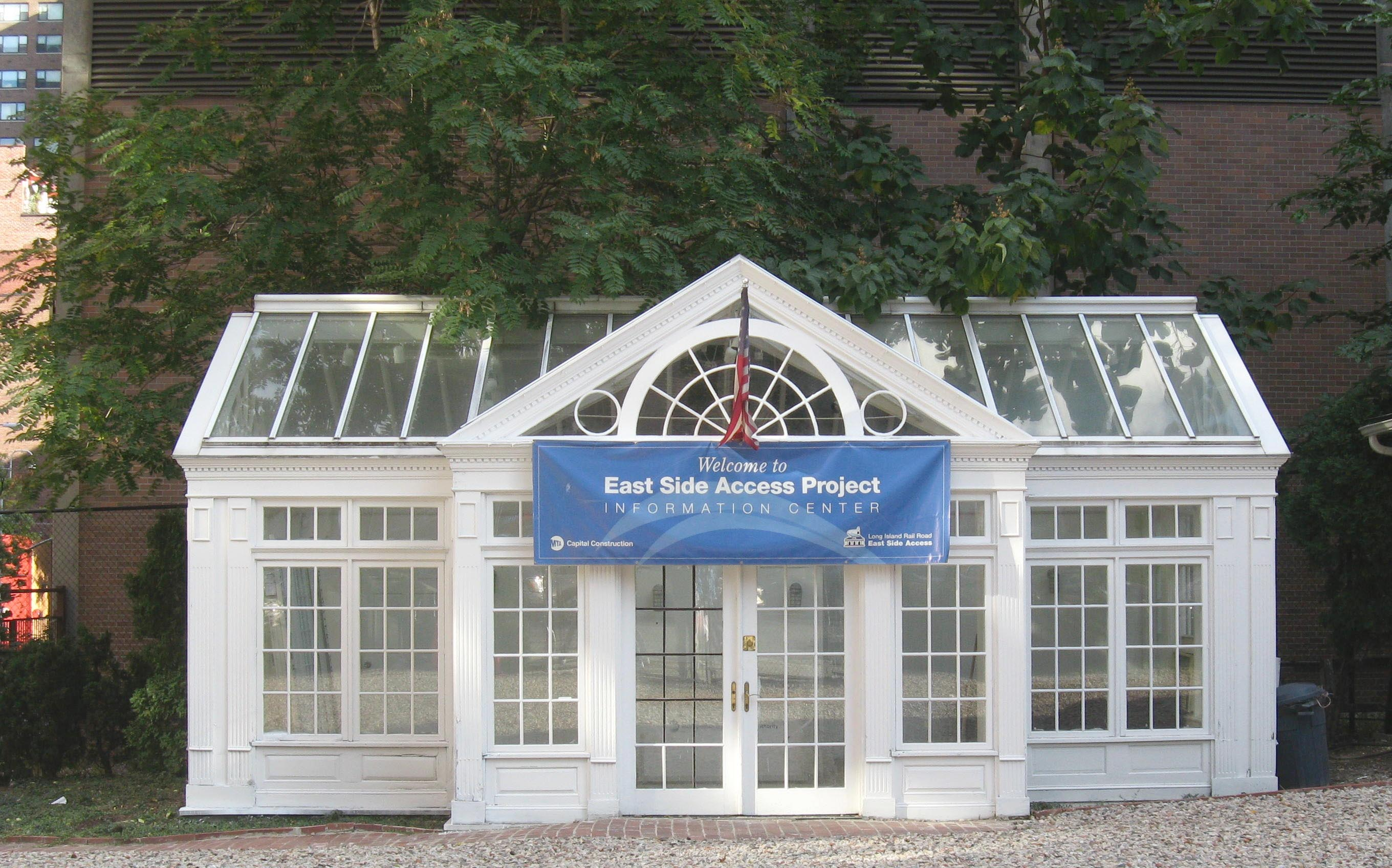
East Side Access Project Information Center

After the September 11, 2001, attacks, the MTA said it would accelerate the construction of East Side Access. LIRR president Kenneth J. Bauer said, "The incident of September 11 shows the importance of East Side Access to a greater degree. If something happened at the East River tunnel, you wouldn't be able to run trains to Penn Station." The MTA and Governor Pataki supported East Side Access and the Second Avenue Subway, both of which involved building new railroad infrastructure on the East Side. In 2002, Congress allocated $132 million for infrastructure projects in New York State, including $14.7 million for East Side Access. A final design for the project was approved in 2002, and the first properties for it were acquired in 2003.

In 2004, some business owners in Midtown announced their opposition to a proposed 16-story ventilation building at 50th Street east of Madison Avenue. They said that the building would cause pollution and that it could be vulnerable to terrorist attacks. Catholic Archbishop Cardinal Edward Egan of the Roman Catholic Archdiocese of New York worried about the effect on St. Patrick's Cathedral, which faced Fifth Avenue with its back on Madison Avenue north of 50th Street. At first, MTA officials held fast to their plans, but after continued opposition, they reduced the size of the building and moved the structure's cooling towers.

=== Construction progress ===
Funding for MTA capital projects such as East Side Access, the Second Avenue Subway, and the 7 Subway Extension were included in the Rebuild and Renew Transportation Bond Act of 2005. As part of this act, the state would take on $2.9 billion in debt to issue bonds to fund these projects. Voters ultimately approved the bond issue by a margin of 55% to 44%. The federal government committed to provide $2.6 billion to help build the project by signing a full funding grant agreement in December 2006. The construction contract for a 1-mile (1.6 km) tunnel in Manhattan westward and southward from the dormant lower level of the 63rd Street Tunnel to the new 100-foot-deep (30 m) station beneath Grand Central Terminal was awarded in July 2006. The contract went to Dragados/Judlau, a joint American–Spanish venture whose American headquarters were in College Point, Queens, close to the East Side Access site. The total contract award was $428 million and used two large tunnel boring machines. After Hurricane Sandy flooded the East River Tunnels between Queens and Penn Station in 2012, officials prioritized the construction of East Side Access so that LIRR trains could be diverted to Grand Central, allowing the East River Tunnels to be renovated.

==== Manhattan side ====
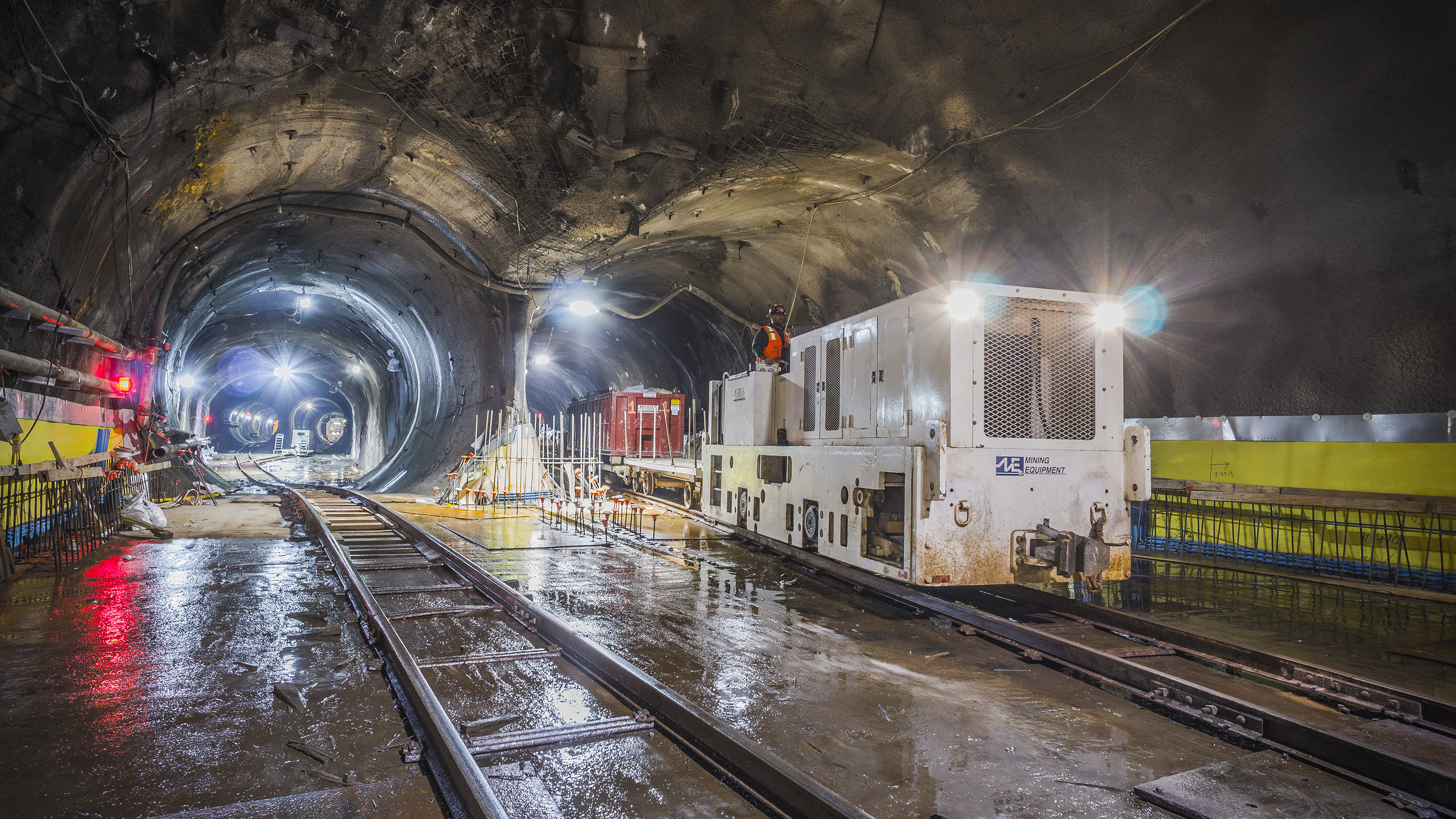
A tunnel cavern deep under Park Avenue, to the north of the new LIRR station, which now houses a switch

Work on the Manhattan side included building a new 8-track train station with storage tracks extending to 38th Street. North of the station, the tunnels would connect to the 63rd Street Tunnel's lower level. The new station would be housed in two gigantic caverns blasted out of the Manhattan schist rock formation under the station. A three-level structure was being built in each cavern, with one 1,020-foot-long (310 m) train platform and two tracks each on the top and bottom levels. A passenger concourse was being constructed between each cavern's upper and lower levels. An upper-level concourse, accessed by a series of stairs, elevators, and escalators, would replace ten tracks on the west side of Metro-North's Madison Yard. The cavern structure is located under the Park Avenue Viaduct, which surrounds Grand Central Terminal, while the storage tracks are located under the Park Avenue Tunnel, which is located south of Grand Central Terminal.

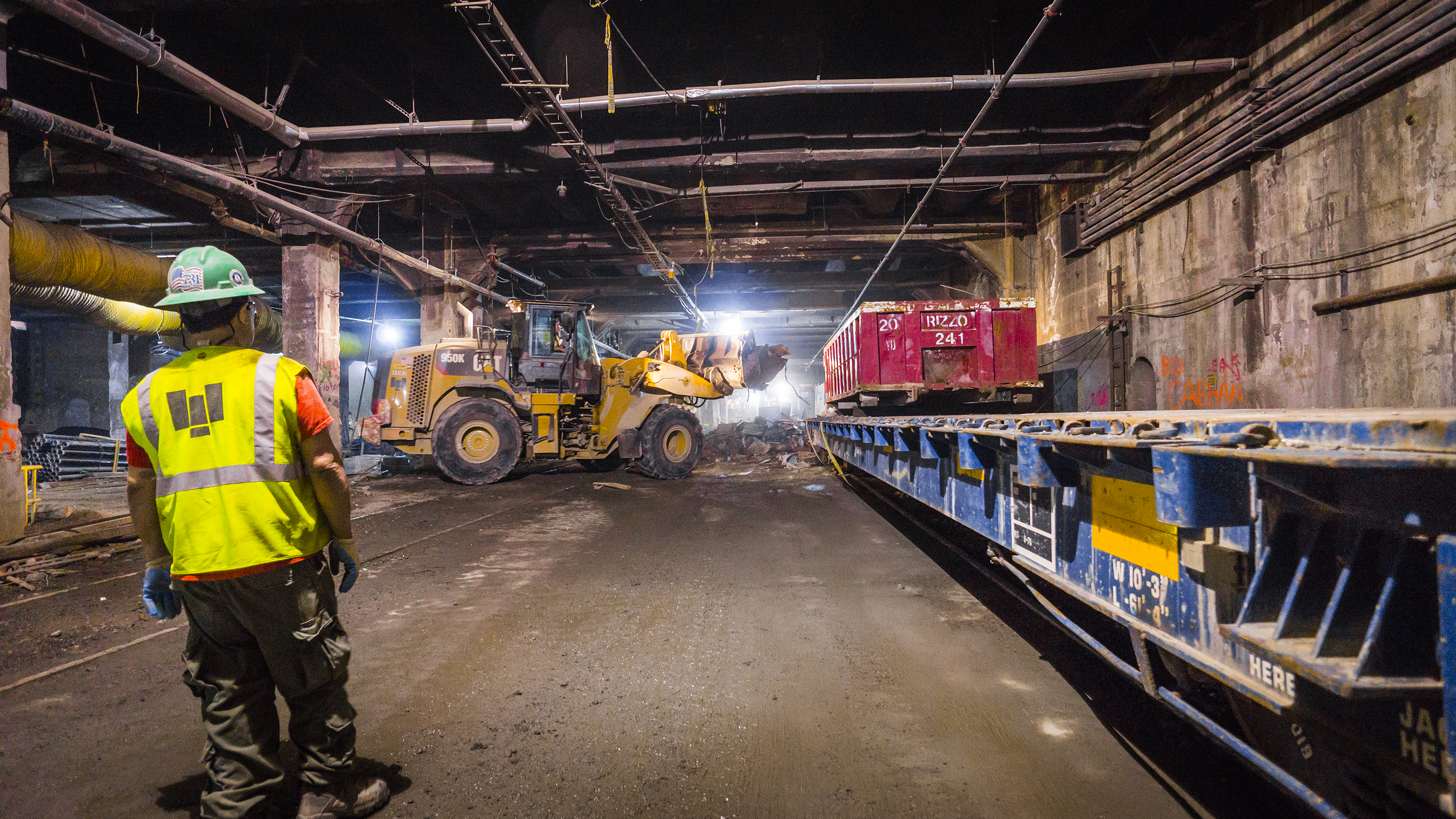
Construction of the station's upper concourse in the Grand Central Terminal's Madison Yard in May 2014. Two of the yard's tracks were kept in service during construction to bring in equipment and remove debris.

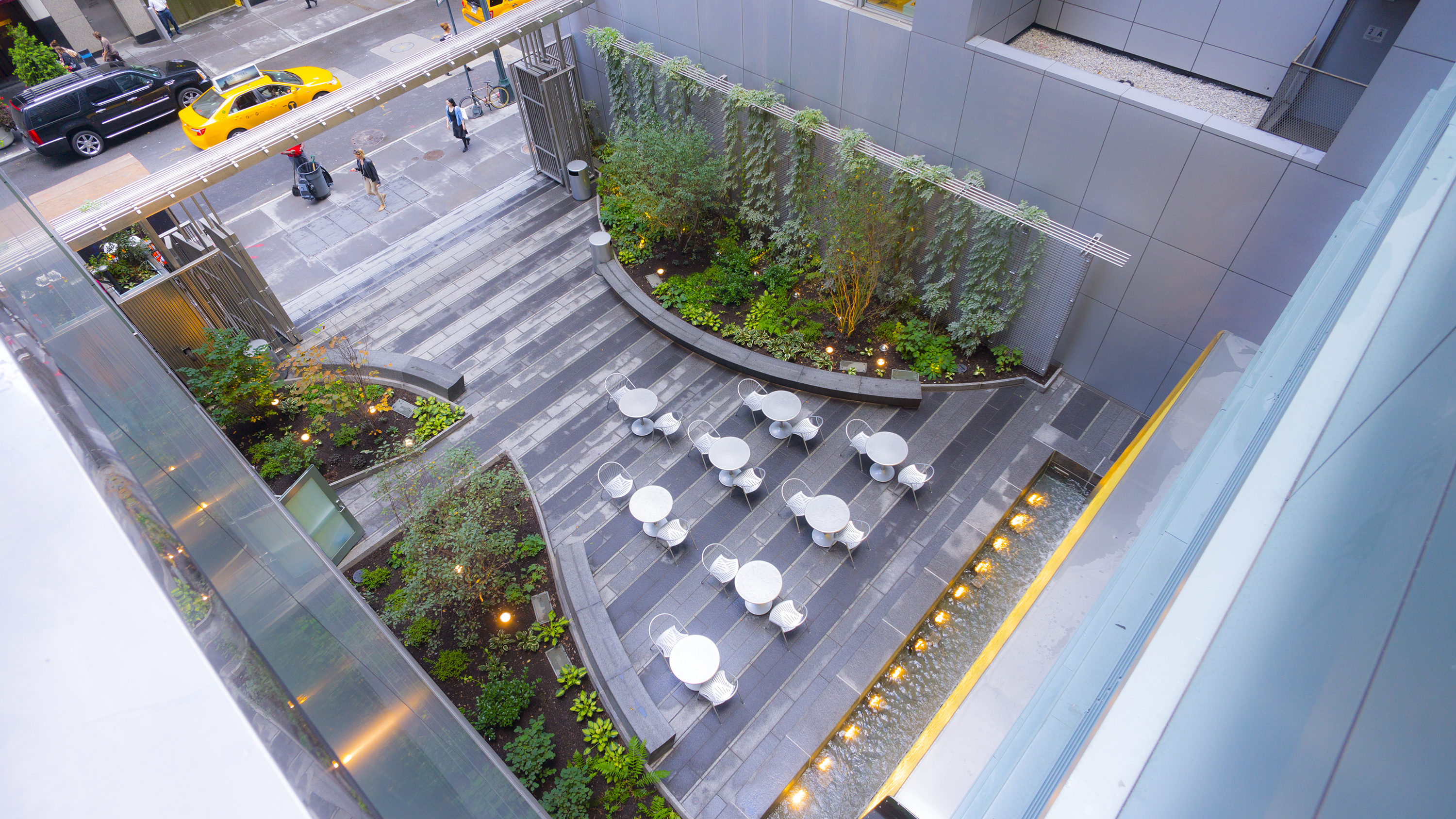
50th Street Commons pocket park

The track connections from the new station to the 63rd Street Tunnel were excavated using tunnel boring machines. The first machine was delivered in May 2007. Dragados/Judlau created a launch chamber for the tunnel boring machines under Second Avenue at 63rd Street in Manhattan using a controlled drill-and-blast method, then assembled and launched each 640-ton machine. The first tunnel boring machine was launched westbound then southbound from the 63rd Street Tunnel in September 2007, and it reached Grand Central Terminal in July 2008. The second machine began boring a parallel tunnel in December 2007 and had completed its tunnel at 37th Street on September 30, 2008. Geocomp Corporation was hired to monitor the boring, using a battery of instruments to record vibration, ground settlement and any tilting or drift suffered by the tunnel boring machines. The instruments include inclinometers, extensometers, seismographs, observation wells, dynamic strain gauges, tilt meters and automated motorized total stations with prismatic targets. The tunnel boring machines bored an average of 50 feet (15 meters) per day. Cross-connections between the tunnels were created under Park Avenue, between 49th and 51st Streets, by controlled drill-and-blast. The work began in mid-July 2008 and required between six and eight months to complete.

In April 2008, the MTA awarded Dragados/Judlau another contract. The $506 million contract was for excavating caverns for the three-level platform structures, mezzanine, escalators, passageways, and track crossovers. The MTA gave Gramercy Group Inc. the $38.9 million contract to reconfigure part of Madison Yard in March 2009. In September 2009, the MTA awarded Yonkers Contracting Company a $40.8 million contract to demolish a building at 47 East 44th Street and construct a ventilation plant & concourse entrance on the building site, along with constructing a station entrance at an existing office tower at 245 Park Avenue (at East 46th Street). Smaller contracts for electrical installations and structural repairs were also awarded in 2008. In 2010, the New York City Business Integrity Commission found that a subcontractor for the East Side Access project was involved with an organized crime family. The subcontractor, who had been hired to haul away the dirt from the excavation process, was replaced.

In July 2011, after the tunnel boring machines finished drilling through the Grand Central station box, they were left in place under 38th Street and Park Avenue, as it was more economical than disassembling them in Queens and selling them for scrap, which could have added $9 million to the project's final cost. The next step in construction was to make cast-in-place concrete sections to create the tunnel lining. Each tunnel was 22 feet (7 meters) in diameter, with an average depth of 140 feet (43 m) beneath street level.

In September 2014, the MTA opened a 2,400-square-foot (220 m^{2}) pocket park, at 48 East 50th Street between Madison and Park Avenues, created along with a $97 million ventilation facility at that location. The pocket park, known as 50th Street Commons, has a capacity of 100 people standing, or 40 people sitting down. The park, containing abundant greenery along a granite backdrop with tables and chairs, was meant to reduce noise pollution from the ventilation facility, which also served as an emergency exit.

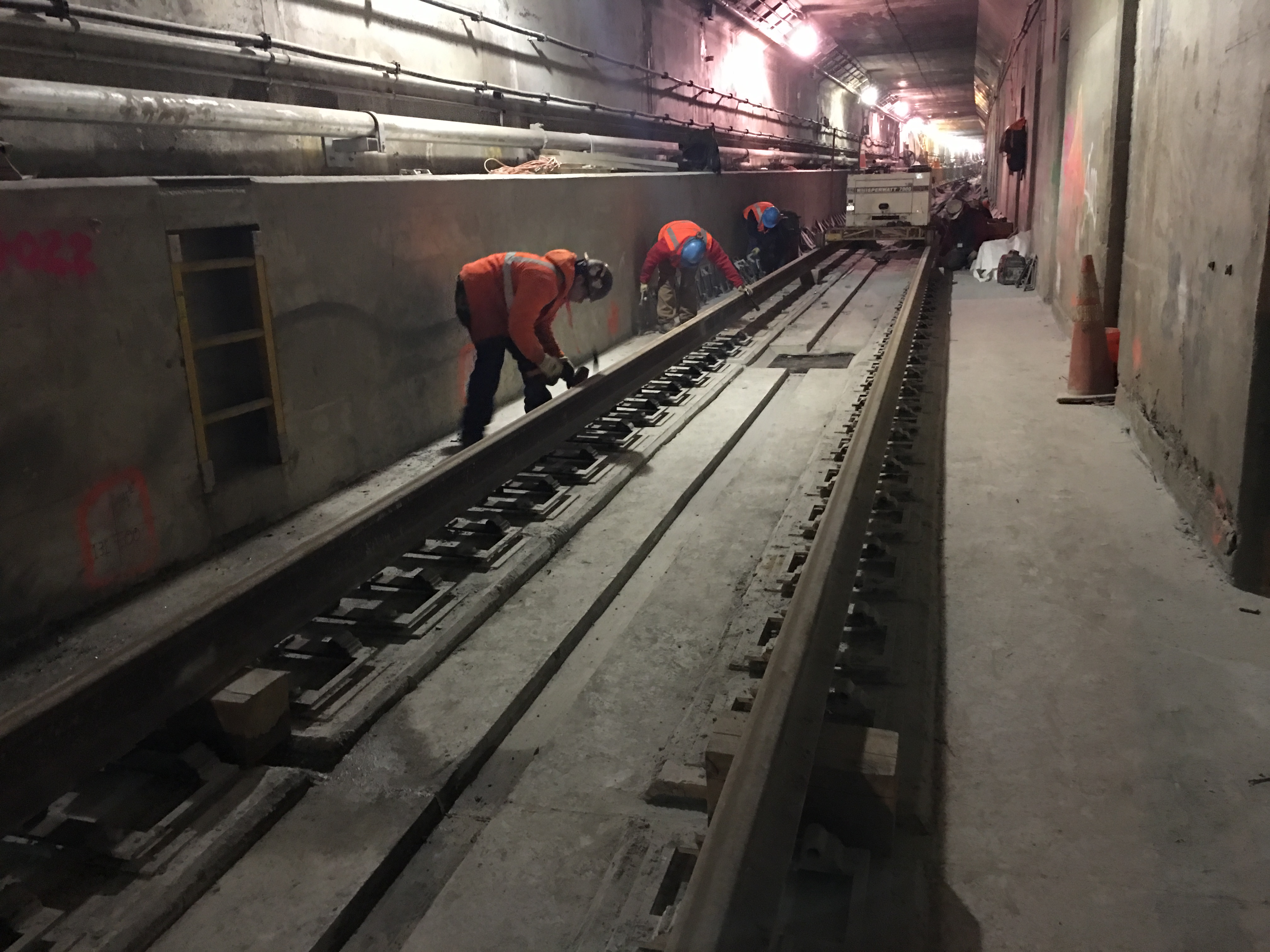
Tracks being laid in the 63rd Street Tunnel

On October 26, 2015, a 1,920-square-foot (178 m^{2}) seating area in Grand Central Terminal's lower-level dining concourse was closed to build structural framework that would allow for the construction of stairways and escalators between the concourse and new LIRR station. This was deemed a major milestone in the construction of East Side Access by Dr. Michael Horodniceanu, President of MTA Capital Construction. On November 10, 2015, a groundbreaking ceremony was held to celebrate the emergence of the project into Grand Central Terminal.

On January 27, 2016, the final major contract for the construction of East Side Access was awarded to Tutor Perini Corporation. The contract was for the construction of four railroad platforms and eight tracks for the new Grand Central Terminal. The first tracks inside the 63rd Street Tunnel were laid in September 2017. The pre-cast platforms inside Grand Central Terminal were completed in May 2018, followed by the completion of the tracks in August 2018. The MTA also started installing escalators between the lower concourse and the platform mezzanine. Beginning in April 2018, the MTA began conducting site tours of the project; it had given 35 tours by September 2018. In advance of the planned deconstruction of 270 Park Avenue above East Side Access, the MTA and 270 Park Avenue's owner JPMorgan Chase signed an agreement in July 2019, in which JPMorgan agreed to ensure that the deconstruction of 270 Park Avenue would not disrupt the timeline of East Side Access.

==== Queens side ====
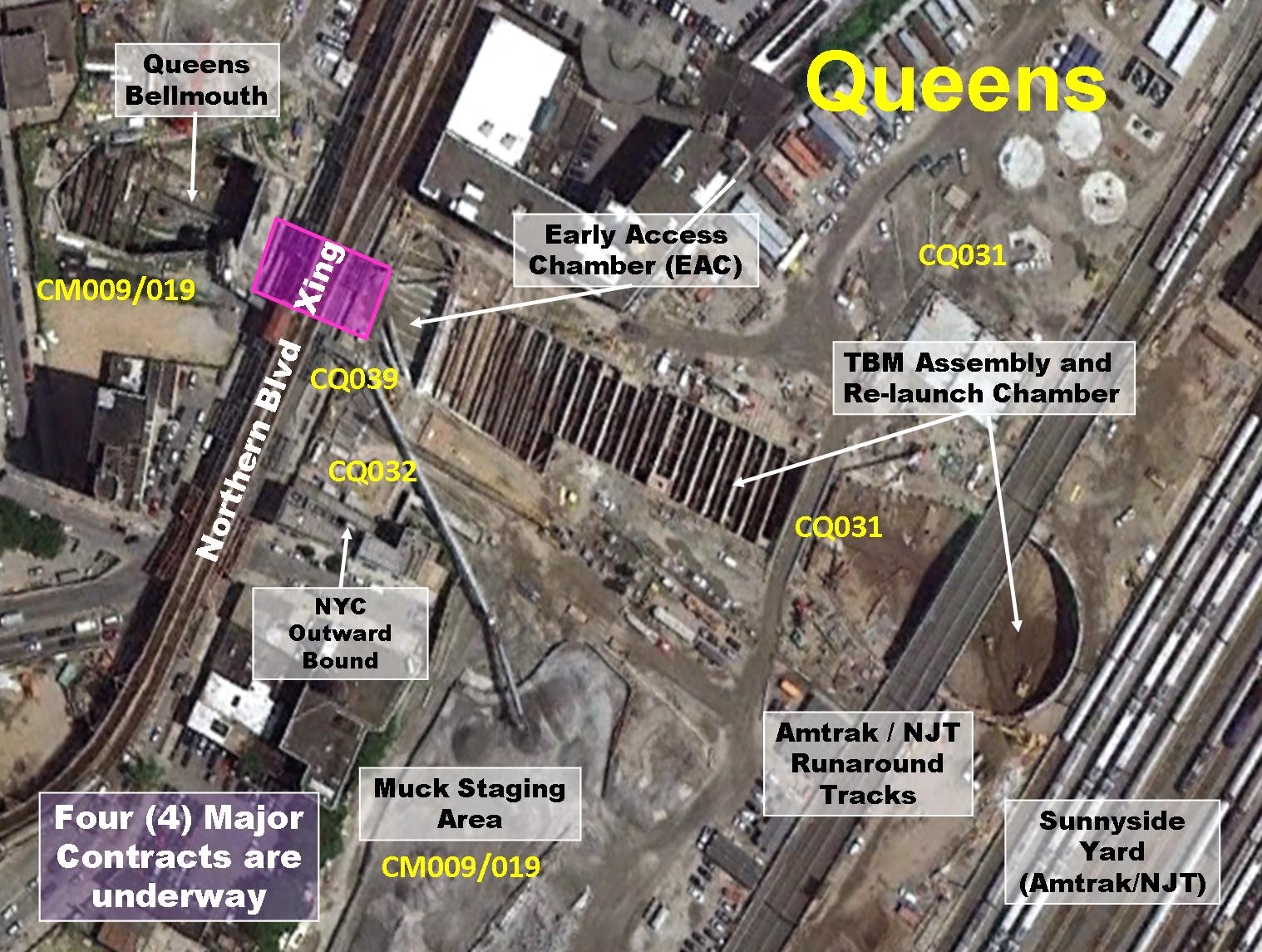
Construction site in Queens, nicknamed the "Q-tip," where tunnels under the Sunnyside Yard were launched and the connection under Northern Boulevard to the 63rd Street Tunnel was made

Previous work extending subway service through the upper level of the 63rd Street Tunnel to lines in Queens also extended the lower level to a point west of Northern Boulevard, across from the Sunnyside Yard. Work in Queens included extending the tunnel under Northern Boulevard and boring four tunnels under Sunnyside Yard. This was a particularly delicate and expensive task because of the elevated BMT Astoria Line and the underground IND Queens Boulevard Line directly above. The existing tunnel bellmouth west of Northern Boulevard was expanded to serve as the staging area for the Manhattan work, bringing in workers, equipment and supplies, and bringing out the muck and debris from excavation. A temporary narrow-gauge railway and a conveyor belt system were constructed behind the tunnel boring machines (TBMs) and through the 63rd Street Tunnels to the Queens bellmouth. Due to its shape, the Queens work site was nicknamed the "Q-tip".

Pile Foundation Construction Company built an $83 million cut structure, which extends the tracks under Northern Boulevard into the Sunnyside Yard. It created an area that served as the launch chamber for soft-bore Queens tunnels that would connect the 63rd Street line to the main LIRR branches, and an interlocking and emergency exit and venting facility. The cut was then covered with a deck. In August 2009, Perini Corp. was awarded a $144 million contract to reconfigure the Harold Interlocking railway junction, increasing its capacity to accommodate trains bound for Grand Central Terminal, and to construct new yard lead tracks to allow trains to enter the storage yards. Smaller contracts for structural work, environmental monitoring, and data measurement were also awarded. Some Amtrak buildings in Sunnyside Yard were demolished to make room for the East Side Access portals in Queens.

In September 2009, the MTA awarded Granite-Traylor-Frontiere Joint Venture a $659.2 million contract to use two custom-built 500-ton slurry TBMs to create the tunnels connecting the LIRR Main Line and the Port Washington Branch to the 63rd Street Tunnel under 41st Avenue. The four tunnels, with precast concrete liners, total 2 miles (3.2 km) in length. The contract included a $58 million option to dig three tunnel pits and three emergency shafts and to complete an open cut. The TBMs, which could dig through several types of earth, were the first such machines to be used in the New York City area.

The two TBMs began digging on the Queens side in April 2011. On December 22, 2011, breakthrough was achieved in Tunnel "A" of the four Queens tunnel drives from the 63rd Street Tunnel bellmouth. By July 25, 2012, all four Queens tunnel drives were complete. In April 2014, contracts were awarded for the final modifications for the tunnels, as well as for communication systems.

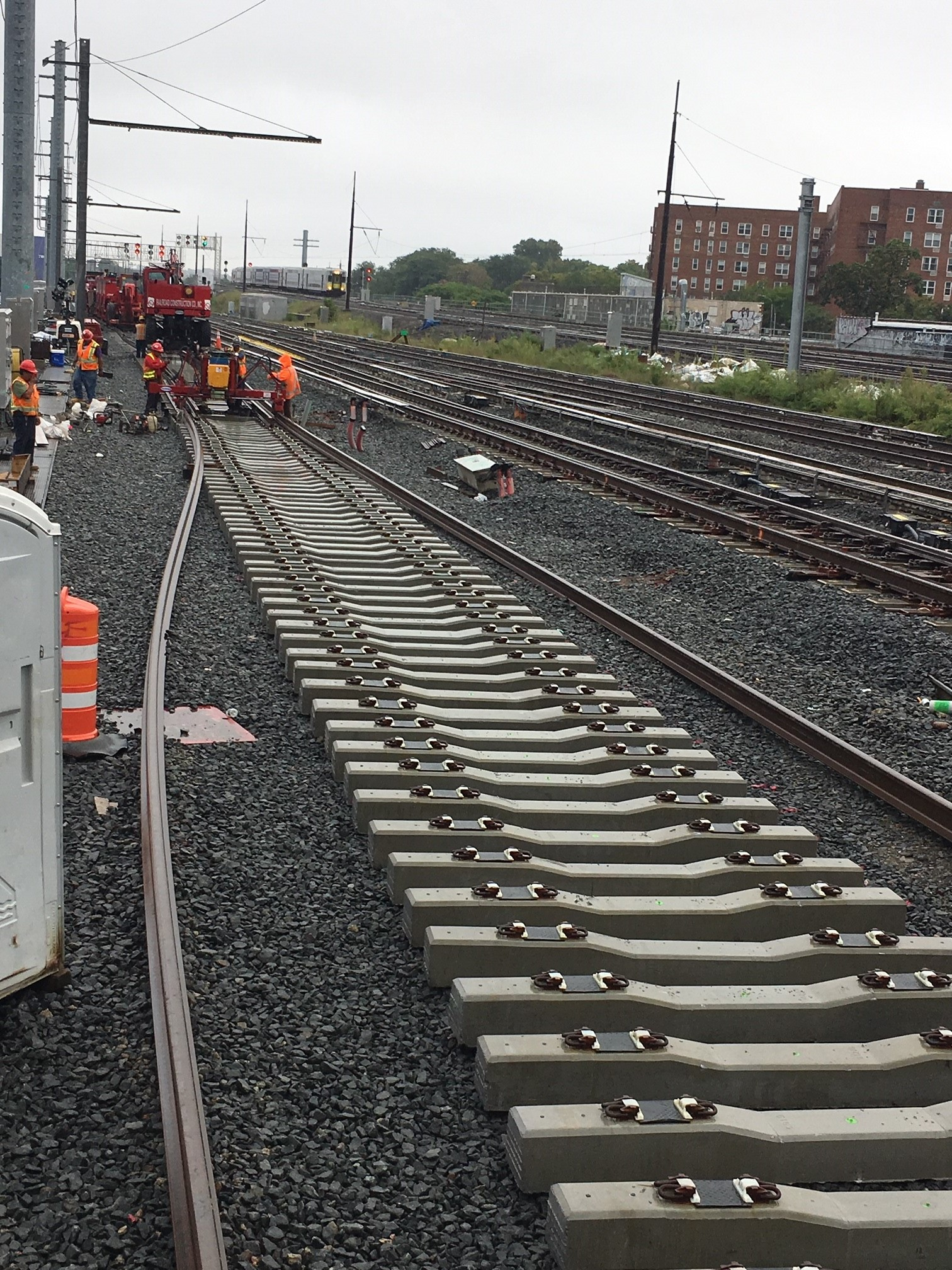
Rail laying for the Amtrak westbound bypass tunnel in Queens

The project also added two bypass tunnels for Amtrak trains within Harold Interlocking. While eastbound Amtrak trains to New England would be able to go through the interlocking without crossing the paths of East Side Access trains, westbound Amtrak trains to Penn Station would use tracks that intersected East Side Access tracks. East Side Access trains to Grand Central came from the east and would diverge to the northwest while Amtrak trains to Penn Station came from the north and would continue west, so the final environmental impact statement called for a bypass for westbound trains. Around $295 million was allocated for the bypass in 2011, and work on this project started in 2013. However, by October 2015, the tunnels were behind schedule because Amtrak and the MTA could not cooperate on track access schedules. These delays ultimately raised construction costs by almost $1 billion as of April 2018, and in a report that month, the MTA attributed the delays to a lack of cooperation on Amtrak's part. The work at Harold Interlocking also included the installation of a microprocessor-based signal system, replacing the old track circuit-based signal system.

In July 2018, workers started realigning tracks to make way for the construction of the Queens tunnel portal, which was the final major contract not underway at the time. The realignment of the three westbound Main Line and Port Washington Branch tracks, as well as the construction of a new eastbound Main Line track to replace an existing track, were completed by the end of summer 2018. The last major construction contract—$60 million to move tracks in Harold Interlocking and build a tunnel portal structure for Tunnel B/C—was awarded to Skanska in October 2018. Work on the tunnel structure was expected to run from mid-2019 to mid-2021. Work on the Midday Storage Yard also progressed, and by 2019, tracks were being laid in the storage yard. The portal for Tunnel B/C was completed by early 2021, and the yard was 99 percent complete by that May.

=== Final work and opening ===
By May 2021, finishes were being placed in the station; the third rail, signals, and other right-of-way equipment were being tested. On October 31, 2021, Governor Kathy Hochul rode the first passenger test train through the East Side Access tunnels to Grand Central Terminal. In May 2022, MTA chairman Janno Lieber announced that the project was still scheduled for completion by the end of the year, and Hochul announced that the new station would be named "Grand Central Madison". More extensive tests of operation and safety features (e.g., the positive train control system) were underway and were expected to be completed by the end of 2022.

By late 2022, there were concerns that the project's completion could be delayed to March 2023. At the time, the MTA had not yet activated the Advanced Civil Speed Enforcement System, which would automatically activate the brakes of oversized trains that attempted to enter the tunnels. In addition, mass-transit ridership declined significantly following the onset of the COVID-19 pandemic in early 2020, and the LIRR's passenger numbers had not completely recovered more than two years later. Large amounts of office space in Midtown Manhattan were still vacant, although MTA officials expressed optimism that the completion of East Side Access would attract office workers back to Midtown. The LIRR received operational control of the Grand Central Madison station on December 9, 2022, upon which the station and tracks became subject to Federal Railroad Administration regulations. The Grand Central Madison station remained unopened two weeks later; MTA chairman Janno Lieber attributed the delays to a single ventilation fan that could not exhaust enough air.

At the end of December 2022, the MTA postponed the station's opening to January 2023. Early the next month, Lieber indicated that the station's opening could be postponed further to February 2023. Non-revenue shuttle trains began running on January 11, 2023, and the FRA said on January 19 that the LIRR had finished installing ACSES equipment in the tunnels. On the evening of January 23, 2023, it was announced that the station would open on January 25; the station opened as scheduled on that date, with the first train leaving Jamaica at 10:45 am. The initial "Grand Central Direct" service ran only between Jamaica and Grand Central Madison, with trains alternatively skipping or serving all intermediate stops. On February 8, 2023, the MTA announced that it would implement full service on February 27, with 296 daily trains operating to or from Grand Central Madison.

== Route ==
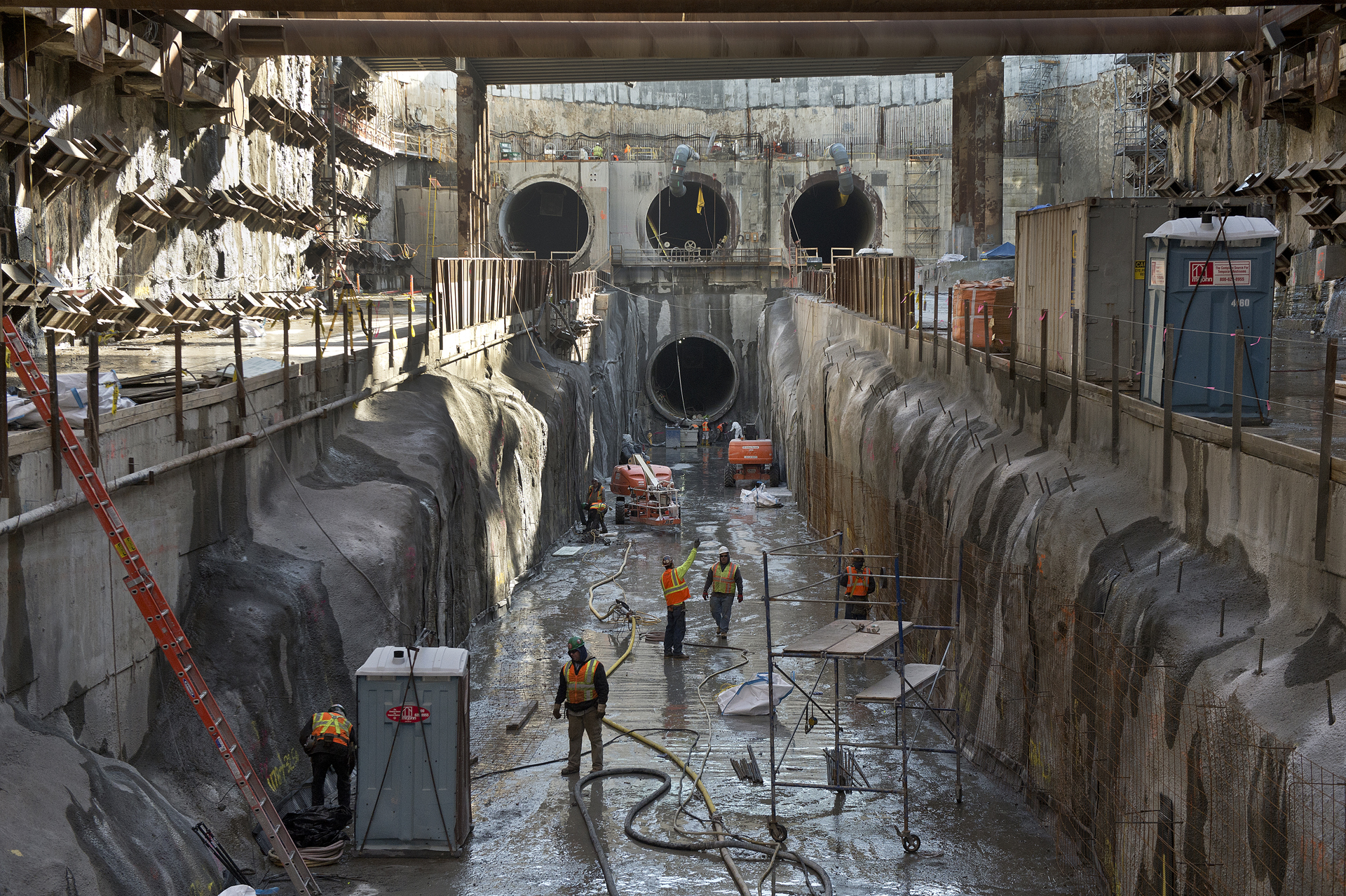
Starting point for the four Queens tunnels under Sunnyside Yard. The top three tunnels (Tunnels A, B/C, and D, from left to right) connect to the LIRR Main Line, while the bottom tunnel connects to storage and maintenance tracks.

Extending between Sunnyside Yard in Queens and Grand Central Terminal in Manhattan, the East Side Access project created an LIRR branch from its Main Line through new track connections at Harold Interlocking within Sunnyside Yard, and through the lower level of the existing 63rd Street Tunnel under the East River. A storage yard adjacent to Sunnyside Yard is also being built, connecting to the 63rd Street Tunnel via a loop. In Manhattan new tunnels begin at the western end of the 63rd Street Tunnel at Second Avenue, curving south under Park Avenue and entering a new LIRR terminal beneath Grand Central. Excluding storage tunnels, the project is about 4 miles (6.4 km) long, consisting of 5,500 ft (1,700 m) of new route in Queens, 8,600 ft (2,600 m) of preexisting route under the 63rd Street Tunnel, and 7,200 ft (2,200 m) of new route in Manhattan.

On the Queens side, four tunnels merge into two tracks and enter the lower level of the 63rd Street Tunnel. Three of them (Tunnels A, B/C, and D) connect to the busy Harold Interlocking, splitting off the Main Line. A fourth tunnel on a lower level connects to the Midday Storage Yard. The Midday Storage Yard, located to the northwest of the existing Sunnyside Yard, comprises 33 acres (13 ha) and will contain 24 storage tracks once completed. Tutor Perini is constructing the $291 million yard just south of the existing Harold Interlocking.

The line fans out into a bi-level station under Grand Central Terminal with eight tracks, four on each level. South of the station, the four tracks on each level merge into two 1,700-foot-long (520 m) storage tracks, with one in each cavern on each level. These storage tracks, which extend under Park Avenue south to 38th Street, are long enough to store one 1,020-foot-long (310 m), 12-car train. The storage tracks were not part of the original proposal, as they were added in a 2008 modification to the plans for East Side Access.

The project also included the construction of several ventilation plants. One is located at 44th Street, near the Yale Club of New York City, while another is located at 50th Street east of Madison Avenue. Ventilation facilities are also located on Park Avenue at 38th Street and at 55th Street, as well as on 63rd Street at York Avenue and at 2nd Avenue.

== Station ==
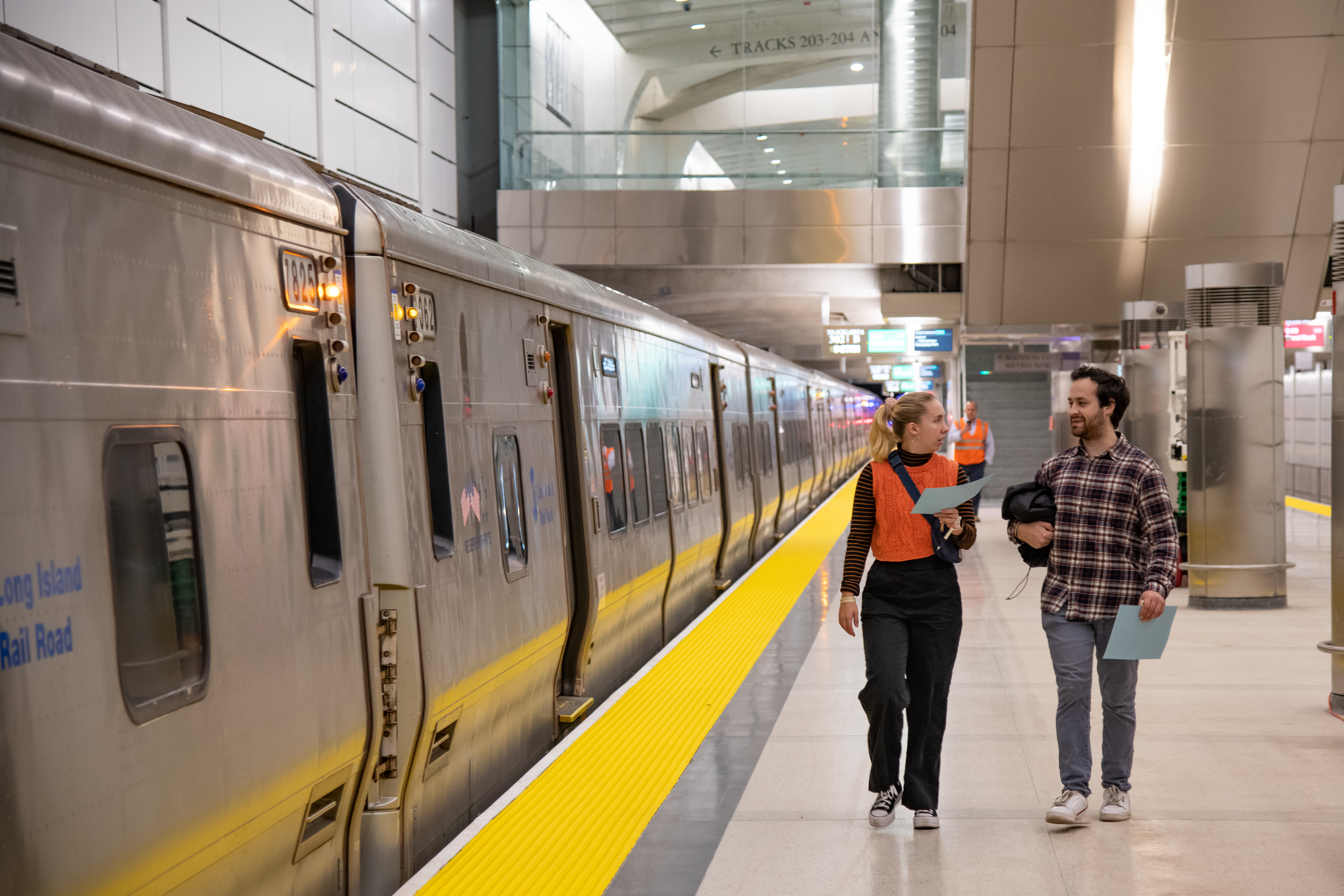
Platform of the new terminal

The new LIRR terminal at Grand Central, located 14 stories below ground, has 350,000 square feet (33,000 m^{2}) with four platforms and eight tracks, plus a new retail and dining concourse with 25 retail spaces. There are two caverns containing one platform and two tracks on each of two levels; a mezzanine is located between the two platform levels. The LIRR terminal is accessed via stairwells, 22 elevators, and 47 escalators connecting to the existing food court at the lower level of Grand Central. The number of elevators in this terminal exceeds the 19 escalators in the remainder of the LIRR system combined.

The MTA originally planned to build and open additional entrances at 44th, 45th, 47th, and 48th Streets. The station connects to existing entrances at Grand Central North. The LIRR station also contains entrances at 335 Madison Avenue, near the southeast corner with 44th Street; at 270 Park Avenue and 280 Park Avenue near 47th and 48th–49th Streets, respectively; and at 347 Madison Avenue, on the east side of the avenue at 45th Street. An entrance on 46th Street between Lexington and Park Avenue was also built, connecting with Grand Central North. The MTA later announced its intent to defer construction of an entrance at 48th Street because the owner of 415 Madison Avenue wanted to undertake a major construction project on the site. The MTA also connected the new station to the existing 47th Street cross-passage. The escalators are up to 180 feet (55 m) long and descend more than 90 feet (27 m). The escalators and elevators are among the few privately operated escalators and elevators in the entire MTA system.

== Service changes ==
Trains to Grand Central run 20 hours a day. In 2015, plans called for 24 trains per hour to run to Grand Central during peak morning hours, with an estimated 162,000 passenger trips to and from Grand Central on an average weekday.

Bilevel rail cars, such as the LIRR's DM30AC and C3 fleet, cannot serve Grand Central because their loading gauge is too large for the tunnel. Although M3 electric multiple units can fit in the 63rd Street Tunnel, the fleet is not compatible with the new line's safety and signaling systems. As a result, when East Side Access opened, about 22 percent of the LIRR's fleet was unable to serve Grand Central Madison.

=== Timetable overhaul ===
In anticipation of the completion of East Side Access and related projects, in 2022, the MTA overhauled LIRR timetables for the first time in more than 30 years. On June 2, 2022, the MTA released draft timetables that LIRR president Catherine Rinaldi pronounced "revolutionary", saying, "In one stroke, we are increasing service by 40%." The public was invited to comment on the proposed changes at a virtual public meeting on July 13, 2022; after hundreds of people registered to speak, two more such meetings were added. These meetings notwithstanding, MTA officials said in December that the late-June draft would be implemented when Grand Central Madison opened for full service.

The revised timetables proposed a substantial increase in reverse-peak and off-peak service on most branches. This included half-hourly off-peak service on the Main Line to and from Ronkonkoma (increased from hourly) and hourly off-peak service on the West Hempstead Branch (increased from bihourly). Additionally, due to the simultaneous completion of the Main Line Third Track project, reverse-peak service gaps of over 90 minutes along the Main Line were eliminated. (Note: This includes the Main Line west of Hicksville and the Oyster Bay, Port Jefferson, and Ronkonkoma Branches. Prior to the opening of the third track, reverse-peak service was severely limited by the need to use both Main Line tracks in the peak direction during the busiest period of rush hour.) Additionally, most branches received service to both Manhattan terminals, with a considerable increase in the total number of trains to and from Manhattan during peak hours. The inconsistent service patterns of most branches were also restructured into simpler patterns with western zones (closer to New York City) and eastern zones (away from New York City). The draft timetables called for more evenly spaced trains.

The timetables were also designed to accommodate repairs to the East River Tunnels to Penn Station following damage from Hurricane Sandy in 2012. The reduction of tunnel capacity (from four to three operational tunnels) during renovation, resulting in the need to share additional track space with Amtrak and NJ Transit, was cited as a reason for reduction in service to Penn Station in the draft timetables. As of 2022, renovation work was expected to begin no earlier than 2024 and take about three years to complete.

==== Critical reception ====
These changes have met generally positive reception for introducing additional flexibility to peak commuters, especially those traveling to the East Side, and facilitating the development of job centers on Long Island for reverse commuters. In the June 2022 MTA board meeting, chairman Janno Lieber described increased reverse-peak service as having a "potential boom to Long Island's economy".

Some proposed service changes were not well received. The new timetables have been criticized for greatly reducing the amount of through service to Atlantic Terminal and not sufficiently augmenting peak service, with some stations even seeing a slight reduction in peak service. (Note: This includes various stations on different branches, as well as Penn Station, which will be served by 10 fewer AM peak trains.) Additionally, reconfiguration of the track layout of Jamaica station will require Brooklyn-bound riders to perform up-and-over transfers to a new Platform F; this has been criticized as being much less convenient than cross-platform transfers, especially for disabled customers. Riders have also criticized the elimination of timed connections at Jamaica, which will no longer be built into the schedule; the MTA claims that this change will reduce delays and allow more trains to run. (Note: Until 2022, several trains going in the same direction have been scheduled to arrive at Jamaica at the same time, a system through which passengers had quick cross-platform transfers to reach their desired branch. Under the new system, connections will not be timed, requiring riders to wait an arbitrary amount of time for the next train to their destination.) Some have stated that poorly-timed connections, especially to and from Brooklyn shuttles, could lengthen their daily commutes by over 20 minutes. Diesel branches (Note: The Oyster Bay Branch, Port Jefferson Branch east of Huntington, Montauk Branch east of Babylon, and Main Line east of Ronkonkoma) are also not slated to see considerably increased service, as noted by one blogger. Despite this backlash, Lieber urged customers to "give it a chance" and declared that the MTA was "making no apologies" for the proposed service plan.

On September 28, 2022, following backlash from customers, the MTA announced the restoration of three express trains serving Penn Station on the Port Washington Branch, which were initially cut from the draft timetables. The February 2023 timetables were likewise met with mixed reception, with some commuters anticipating newfound flexibility, and others criticizing the MTA for not responding to community feedback on the draft timetables. In particular, riders on the Oyster Bay Branch (a diesel-only branch) expressed concerns that the new schedules had eliminated direct transfers at the Jamaica station, thereby lengthening their commutes.

=== Implementation of changes ===
A shuttle service, Grand Central Direct, operated between Grand Central Madison and Jamaica between January 25 and February 26, 2023. Grand Central Direct trains ran hourly during rush hours in the peak direction stopping at Woodside. Midday and weekend trains operated half-hourly, with one train making stops at Kew Gardens, Forest Hills, and Woodside, and one train running nonstop between Jamaica and Grand Central. On weekdays, the first train left Jamaica at 6:17 am, with the last train leaving Grand Central at 8:04 pm. Trains ran on weekends between 7 a.m. and 10 pm.

On February 8, 2023, the MTA announced that new timetables featuring full service to Grand Central Madison would come into effect on February 27, which were largely unchanged from the draft timetables released in June 2022. Full service was implemented as scheduled on February 27, 2023. After full service was implemented, many riders reported that their trains were delayed and overcrowded. In particular, almost all commuters traveling to or from Brooklyn—who constituted 8 to 12 percent of morning rush-hour riders—had to transfer at Jamaica. These commuters reported that the new schedules either did not give them enough time to transfer, or forced them to wait for long periods. In addition, although the MTA had predicted that 40 percent of riders would travel to Grand Central Madison, only 30 percent ended up doing so. In response to these complaints, the MTA added trips and lengthened existing trains to and from Brooklyn, and they also lengthened trains to and from Penn Station. By November 2023, about two out of five LIRR commuters to Manhattan were traveling through Grand Central Madison.

== Impact ==
A primary goal of the project was to reduce travel time for LIRR passengers traveling to the East Side of Manhattan. The MTA expected passengers to save about 40 minutes during a typical round trip by using Grand Central Madison instead of Penn Station. Shortly after Grand Central Madison opened, a reporter for Gothamist wrote that transferring from there to the Grand Central–42nd Street station on the IRT Lexington Avenue Line (4, 5, 6, and <6> trains) took 10 to 12 minutes on foot via escalators, roughly the same amount of time it took to travel from 34th Street–Penn Station to Grand Central–42nd Street using the IRT Broadway–Seventh Avenue Line and 42nd Street Shuttle.

The project was expected to add passengers on the already overcrowded IRT Lexington Avenue Line and on surface bus routes on the East Side; but to reduce the load on rush-hour E train service between Pennsylvania Station and Midtown East and 7 train service across the East River.

In April 2023, the MTA detailed the effects of the opening of the station on subway ridership. Many fewer people traveled on the subway between the East Side and Penn Station: 31 percent fewer weekday trips between Grand Central and Penn Station, a 34 percent decline on the E train between the East 53rd Street corridor and Penn Station, and 42nd Street Shuttle ridership declined as well. But ridership on the subway from Grand Central to Upper Manhattan increased by 10 percent and to Union Square by 18 percent.

LIRR customer satisfaction, which stood at 81 percent before East Side Access opened, decreased to 68 percent by May 2023, in part because of the loss of direct service to Atlantic Terminal and the discontinuation of timed transfers at Jamaica, an MTA study found. In particular, satisfaction among Atlantic Branch riders had been halved, from 82 percent to 41 percent. Upon the line's first anniversary, ridership and customer satisfaction were growing. Some 40% of LIRR passengers coming from and going to Manhattan were using Grand Central Madison—less than the 45% the MTA expected but up from the 30% the station began opened with. The station served about 80,000 LIRR riders daily, and LIRR customer satisfaction had increased to 70 percent. Passengers who frequently traveled to Grand Central Madison said that the new terminal did not have the right amount of service, had a confusing station layout, and did not have enough restaurants and eateries. Despite these complaints, the number of Long Island residents spending money in Midtown East had increased 60 percent from January 2023.

The opening of East Side Access saw the LIRR run 41 percent more trains per day, including substantial increases in reverse-peak service. MTA Chair Janno Lieber said that "for the first time we have enough capacity to send trains out to Long Island in the morning, and that means that Long Island businesses can recruit the entire region".

In terms of overall ridership there was no meaningful increase. This compares unfavourably with the Crossrail and Thameslink 2000 projects in London which saw large increases in ridership.

== Controversies ==
=== Costs and construction delays ===
The project's estimated cost has increased from $3.5 billion when first proposed to $4.3 billion in 1999, $5.3 billion in 2003, $6.3 billion in 2004, $7.2 billion in 2008, $8.4 billion in 2012, and either $9.7 billion or $10.8 billion in 2014. By 2017, the projected cost was either $12 billion or $10.2 billion, making it the most expensive construction project of its type in the world by either measure. The MTA budgeted a total of $10.178 billion to the project over five 5-year capital programs, up to and including the 2015–2019 capital program. Of these, 27% are federal funds and the other 73% are local funds. As of November 2017, the MTA had spent $7.397 billion of the available funding. As of April 2018, the project was expected to cost $11.1 billion, an increase from a previous estimate of $10.2 billion. The project had $10.3 billion in funding, which allowed construction to continue through 2020. The state legislature had to approve an additional $798 million to allow construction to be completed, but this had not been approved by late 2019.

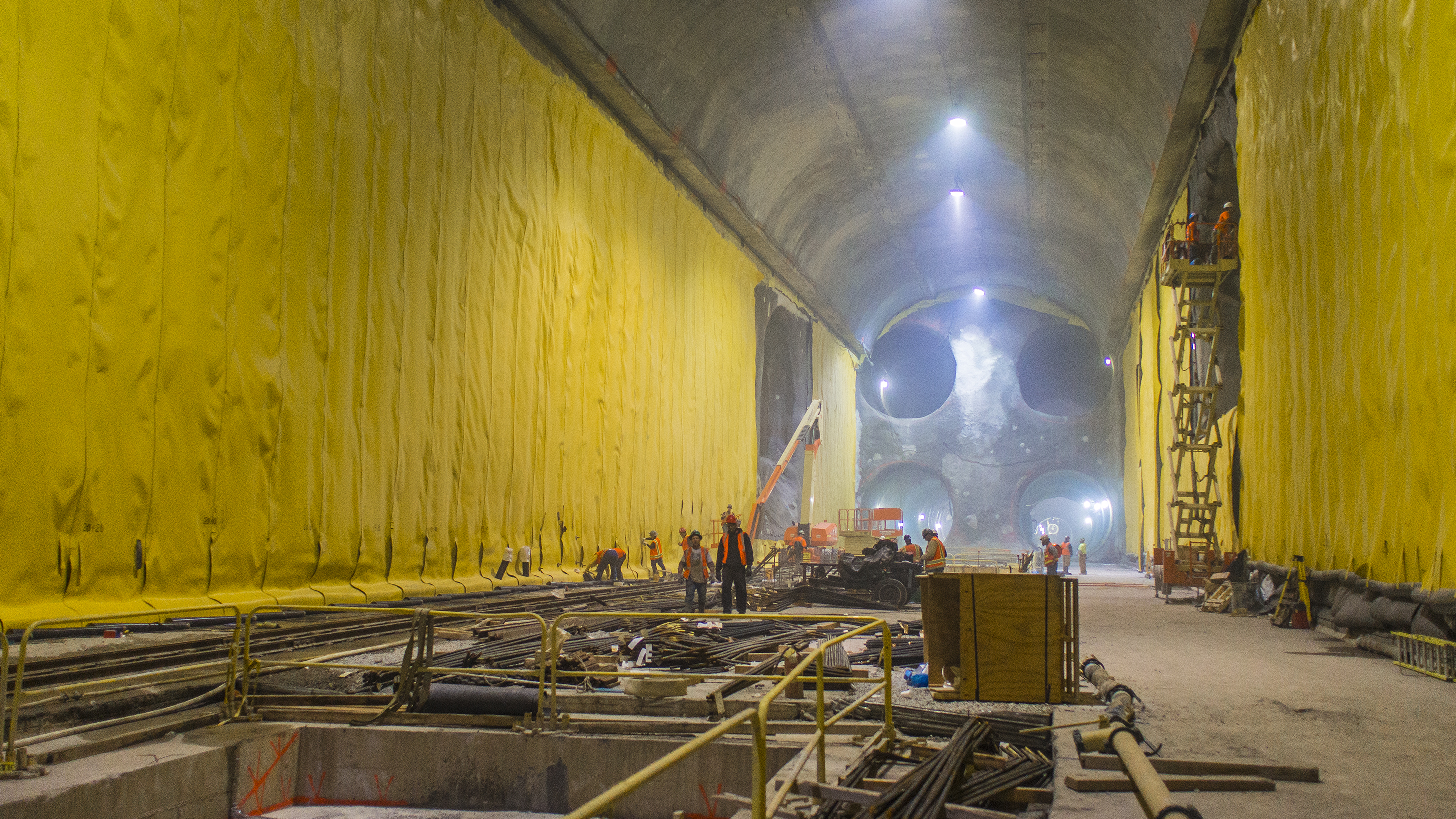
West cavern, seen in January 2014

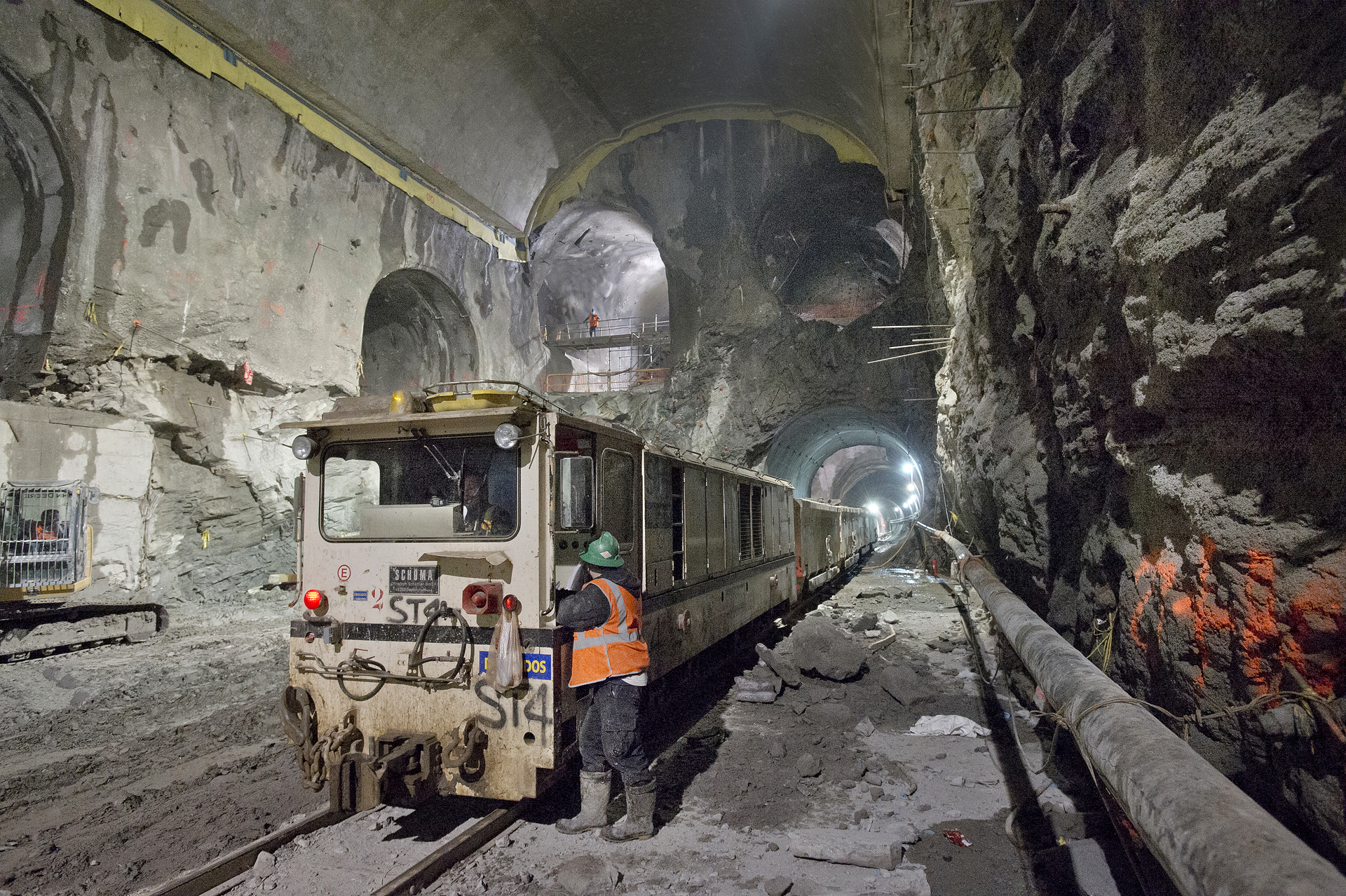
Cavern in January 2013

The completion date for the project has also been pushed back multiple times. Once planned to be operational by 2009 at a cost of $4.3 billion, East Side Access was then rescheduled to open in 2017, 2016, 2018, 2019, September 2023, and then either December 2023 or late 2023. However, by April 2018, the MTA was looking to start passenger service in December 2022, at an estimated cost of $11.1 billion. As of July 2020, the MTA had a "target revenue service" date of May 2022 (whereupon construction would be essentially complete), while the line was planned to open to the public in December 2022. The timeline was only slightly delayed due to the COVID-19 pandemic in New York City. The opening was ultimately postponed to January 25, 2023.

In 2012, the United States Department of Transportation (USDOT)'s Inspector General announced that it wanted an audit done on the project, after the USDOT learned of the fourteen-year delay in the completion date and the more than 100% cost increase. In 2015, the USDOT's Deputy Principal Assistant Inspector General for Auditing and Evaluation, Joseph W. Come, testified before the United States House Committee on Oversight and Government Reform's Subcommittee on Transportation and Public Assets. Come said that several New York City transportation projects also experienced significant delays and cost overruns. This was due to a variety of factors, such as fraud, poor management, and a lack of oversight.

The New York Times reported in 2017 that the project was slated to become the most expensive of its kind in the world. With an estimated cost of $12 billion, or about $3.5 billion per mile ($2.2 billion per kilometer) of new tunnel, the East Side Access tunnels were seven times as expensive as comparable railroad tunnels in other countries. Over the years, the projected cost of East Side Access had risen by billions of dollars due to unnecessary expenses. Contractors for the MTA were paid more than those working in other cities, even though that provided no construction benefits. Planning for East Side Access cost more than $2 billion, and planning for MTA projects in general also made up more of the cost than in other cities' projects. In addition, politicians and trade unions had forced the MTA to hire more workers than were needed. In 2010, an accountant had found that the project was hiring 200 extra workers, at a cost of $1,000 per worker per day, for no apparent reason. The bidding process for MTA construction contracts also raised costs because, in some cases, only one or two contractors would bid on a project. Similar construction projects in New York City, such as the Second Avenue Subway and 7 Subway Extension, had been more expensive than comparable projects elsewhere for the same reasons, even though other cities' transit systems faced similar, or greater, problems compared to the MTA. Other delays were attributed to the fact that dozens of contracts, some of which conflicted with each other, were bid out separately. Cost increases also occurred due to changing the design while construction was underway; ordering components that were the wrong size; failing to cooperate with other transit agencies in Sunnyside Yard; and making infeasible construction-timeline estimates.

In a bid to lower costs and reduce delays, in September 2018, the LIRR hired Arthur R. Troup, who previously held senior positions with Atlanta's and Washington, D.C.'s rapid transit systems, to lead the East Side Access project.

=== Incidents and accidents ===
Several major accidents occurred during construction, and East Side Access has been cited for numerous safety violations. In late 2011, a construction worker died after a tunnel collapsed. In October 2014, a contractor who was digging wells on the Queens side accidentally punctured the subway tunnel underneath, grazing an F train with passengers inside.

== Associated projects ==
=== Arch Street Yard and Shop Facility ===
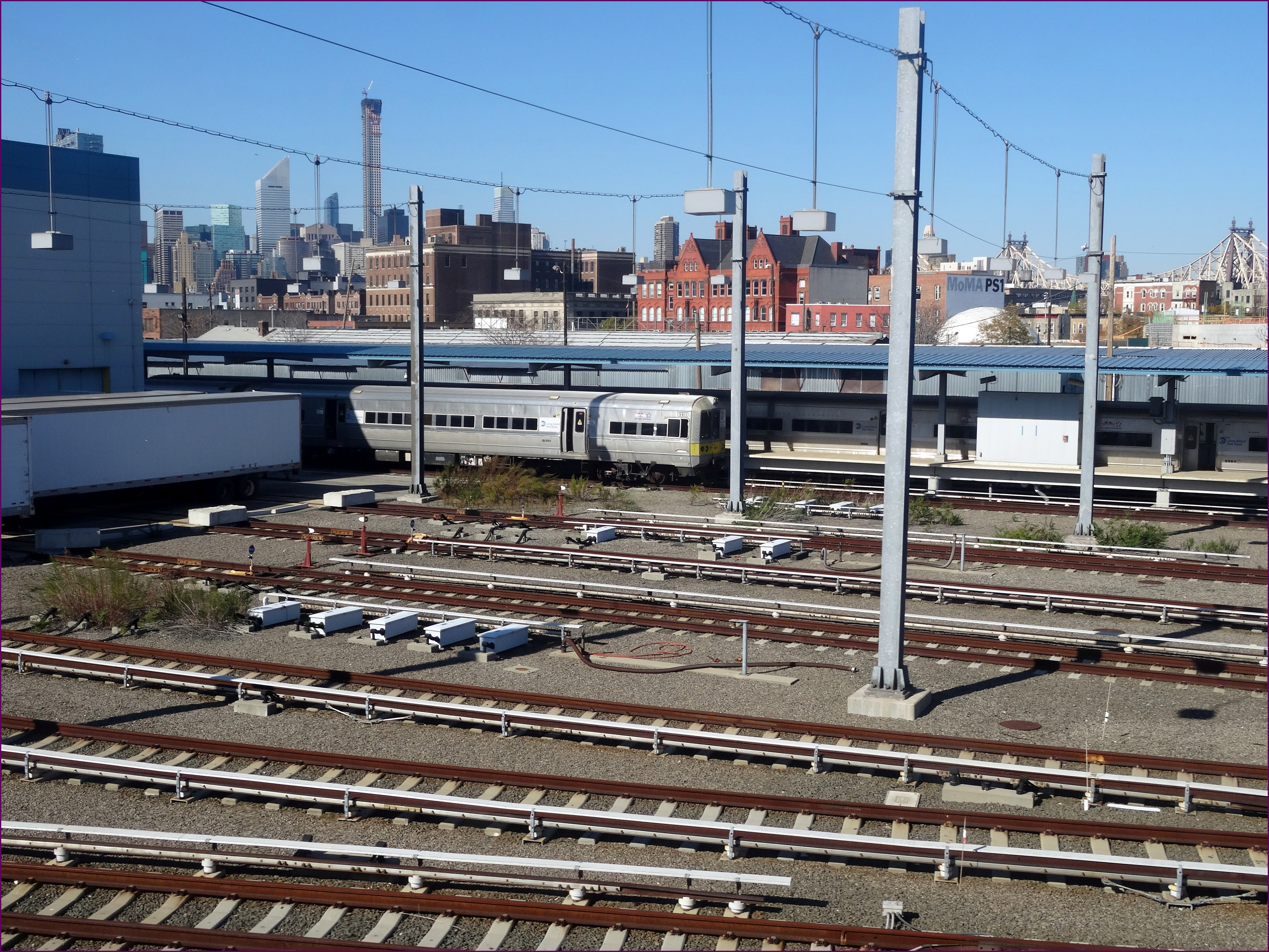
The Arch Street Yard and Shop, as visible from the 7 train window

The Arch Street Yard and Shop is in Long Island City, near the Hunterspoint Avenue station. The yard itself has been in use since at least 1910. The Arch Street Facility includes tracks that were built on the right-of-way of the LIRR's former North Shore Branch. Although the branch formerly extended west to what is now the Gantry Plaza State Park on the East River shoreline, the Arch Street Facility's storage tracks only extend as far as 11th Street, several blocks away from the river.

The LIRR planned a maintenance facility in the yard as part of the East Side Access project. The building was completed in either December 2004 or June 2005. The $80.4 million facility was built using a mix of federal and non-federal funds. The LIRR had built the Arch Street Facility in advance so it could test its then-new M7 cars. When the MTA planned the facility in 2002, it had anticipated that East Side Access would open in 2011 and that the Arch Street Shop could be used to maintain the LIRR fleet. It was thought that the Hillside Facility would not be able to maintain the expanded LIRR fleet on its own. However, after the East Side Access project was repeatedly delayed, the Arch Street Facility was ultimately leased and licensed for other uses.

Just south of the Arch Street Yard, the Montauk Cutoff connected the Main Line to the Montauk Branch until it was decommissioned in 2015. As part of East Side Access, a portion of the cutoff was demolished to make room for the Midday Storage Yard.

=== Proposed Sunnyside station ===
A new LIRR train station in Sunnyside on the west side of Queens Boulevard and Skillman Avenue along the Northeast Corridor (which the LIRR uses to get into Pennsylvania Station) has been proposed, which would provide one-stop access for area residents to Midtown Manhattan. The station would have two side platforms and one island platform, all of which would be able to accommodate 12-car trains. In its 2015–2019 capital program, the MTA had budgeted $76.5 million for the construction of such a station with a proposed start date in January 2021, but then delayed any work until after the completion of East Side Access.

=== Capacity increase ===
The East Side Access project, along with several readiness-improvement projects, will allow the LIRR to run 24 more twelve-car trains during rush hours. This will boost its rush-hour passenger capacity from 300,000 to 425,000 daily commuters, a 45% increase.

==== Main Line third track ====
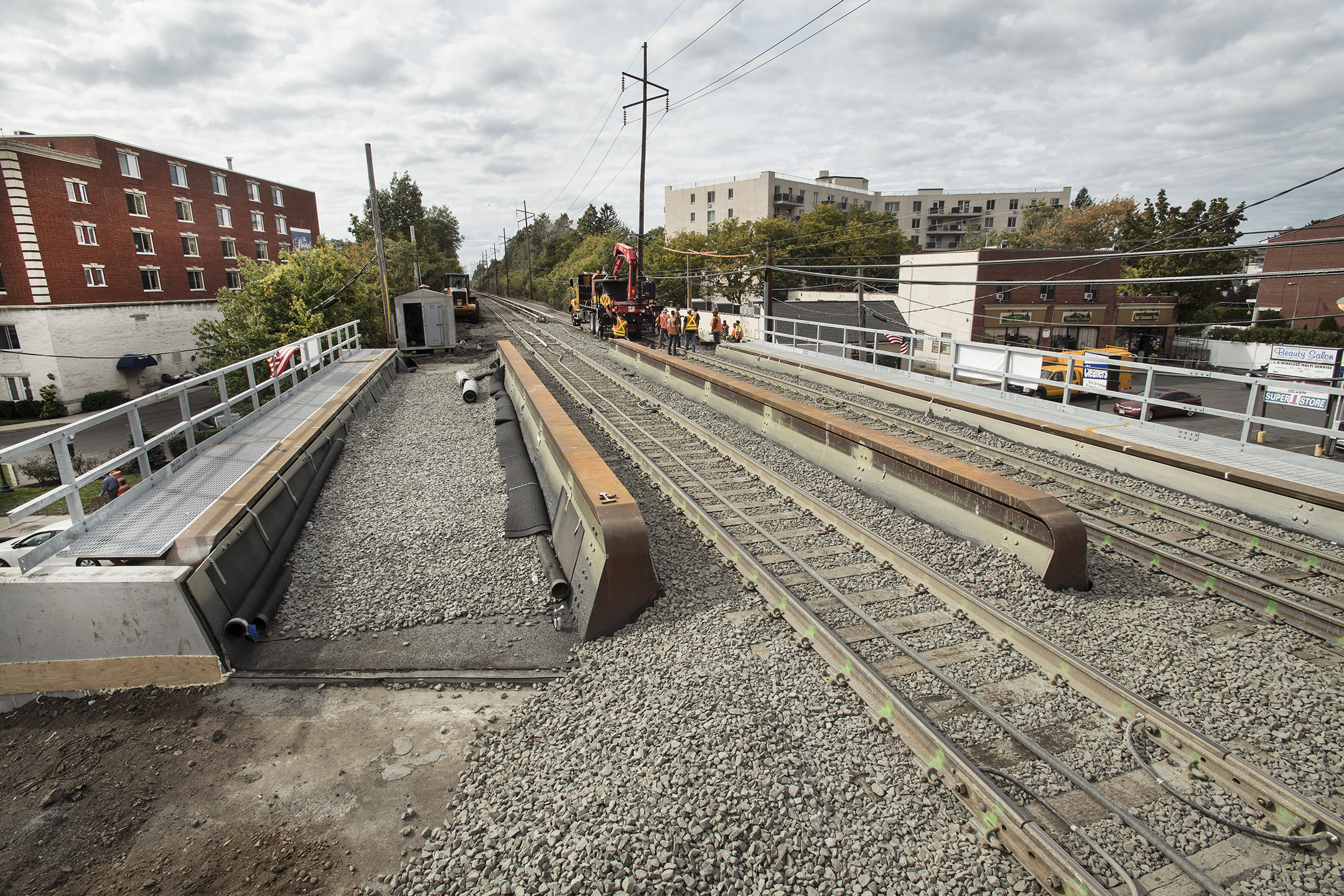
A bridge, built in October 2017 to accommodate a third track on the Main Line

Related to the MTA's East Side Access project is its long-planned widening of the two-track LIRR Main Line by adding a third track. Completion of Main Line third track construction was assumed during East Side Access project planning and referenced in the original East Side Access environmental impact statement as necessary to support service level increases caused by adding service to and from Grand Central. The MTA has said that it considers the Main Line third track an "essential" project to support East Side Access, and that the Main Line third track will "complement the East Side Access megaproject, which is doubling the LIRR's capacity into Manhattan."

The third track's construction was deferred indefinitely by the MTA in 2008 due to budget constraints. In January 2016, Governor Cuomo and the MTA announced plans to restart construction of the Main Line third track. In December 2017, the LIRR awarded a contract for the project to the consortium 3rd Track Constructors for $1.8 billion. A groundbreaking ceremony for the third track project was held on September 5, 2018. The third track opened in several phases and was completed by October 2022.

==== Readiness projects ====
Five "readiness projects" are also under construction across the LIRR system to handle the expanded peak-hour service planned when East Side Access opens. Together, they are expected to cost $495 million.

The largest of these projects is at Jamaica station, where the MTA is re-configuring track layouts, installing high-speed switches, and adding a new Platform F for the Atlantic Branch. The changes will allow the Atlantic Branch to function as a high-frequency shuttle service to Atlantic Terminal, and most trains from Long Island will proceed to either Long Island City station, Penn Station, or Grand Central via the Main Line. The first phase of the project, including the new platform, was completed in 2021 at a cost of $380 million.

Another project will add train storage capacity at two LIRR stations. A 1,700-foot (520 m) siding near Massapequa station on the Babylon Branch will be used to store trains that originate or terminate at the station, enabling more peak-hour service to and from Penn Station/Grand Central. It was originally planned for completion in April 2019, though was delayed until June 2021. The MTA is also extending Track 2 on the Port Washington Branch, which ends as a pocket track east of Great Neck station, eastward by 1,200 feet (370 m) so it can store two trainsets. Additionally, a new bridge was built at Colonial Road near the station; it opened in May 2016 and replaced a 114-year-old span. The construction of the pocket track was originally scheduled for completion in December 2018 at a total cost of $45.2 million. However, the completion date was pushed back several times; as of November 2021, a tentative completion date of August 2022 was announced. Following another delay, construction of the extended pocket track was completed in December 2022.

Finally, the MTA planned to expand two yards. The MTA expanded the rail yard along the Main Line/Ronkonkoma Branch next to Ronkonkoma station, increasing the number of tracks in the yard from 12 to 23. The project was budgeted for $128 million. Construction started in July 2017 and the expanded yard went into service in late 2020. Additionally, the Port Washington Yard, next to Port Washington station on the Port Washington Branch, was planned to be expanded to store two more ten-car trains. As of 2017, construction was scheduled to begin in late 2020 or early 2021 at a cost of $500,000. However, this project met significant community opposition, primarily because of proposed reduction of parking spaces near the station. As of September 2022, the MTA has not come to an agreement with the Town of North Hempstead, resulting in the project being postponed indefinitely.

=== New railcars ===
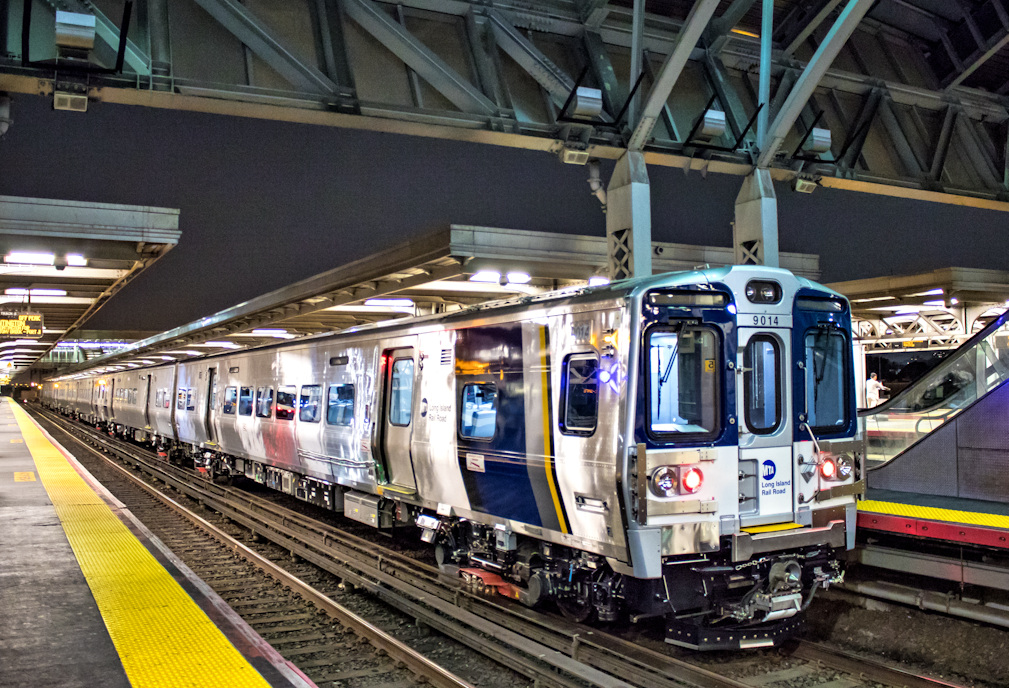
M9 railcars, which were purchased before the opening of East Side Access

The LIRR also purchased up to 160 M9 cars to handle the increased passenger traffic expected with the opening of East Side Access. They are being paid for with federal grant money attached to the project. Although the MTA had ordered the M9s as early as 2013, the contract was delayed several times. As of June 2022, the delivery of M9s was almost three years behind schedule, reportedly due to supply chain issues and labor shortages. Only 132 of 202 cars in the base order have yet been delivered, and the additional 160 M9As did not arrive before the opening of East Side Access. The MTA thus reintroduced about 100 of the older M3 cars (which first entered service the mid-1980s) to provide the advertised additional service. The M3s are slated to remain in service at least until the remaining M9s for fleet expansion are delivered.

=== Penn Station Access ===
Redirecting LIRR trains from Penn Station to Grand Central Terminal frees up tracks and platforms at Penn. This new capacity, as well as track connections resulting from the East Side Access project, allows Metro-North Railroad trains on the New Haven Line to run to Penn Station via Amtrak's Hell Gate Bridge. Four new local Metro-North stations in the Bronx are planned as part of this project, at Co-op City, Morris Park, Parkchester, and Hunts Point. The MTA is constructing a second connection from the Metro-North's Hudson Line to Penn Station using Amtrak's West Side Line in Manhattan. The Penn Station Access project will provide direct rides from Connecticut, Westchester County, the Lower Hudson Valley, and the Bronx to West Midtown; ease reverse-commuting from Manhattan and the Bronx to Westchester County, the Lower Hudson Valley, and Connecticut; and provide transportation service to areas of the Bronx without direct subway service. In December 2021, it was announced that the project would be completed in 2027, several years later than initially proposed.

== See also ==
- Center City Commuter Connection, a similar tunnel opened in Philadelphia in 1984 to connect two previously separate rail terminals
- Fulton Center, another MTA Capital Construction project
- Gateway Program (Northeast Corridor), a railroad expansion project on the west side of Manhattan that started in 2023
- History of Grand Central Terminal, more details about the history of Grand Central Terminal
- Lower Manhattan–Jamaica/JFK Transportation Project, a formerly proposed LIRR project
- North–South Rail Link, a set of proposals for a similar project in Boston
- The Portal, a similar proposal for a tunnel under San Francisco
- Second Avenue Subway, another MTA Capital Construction project, whose Phase I entered service on January 1, 2017
- 7 Subway Extension, a completed MTA Capital Construction project
