= Bridgehampton station =

Long Island Rail Road station in Suffolk County, New York

Bridgehampton
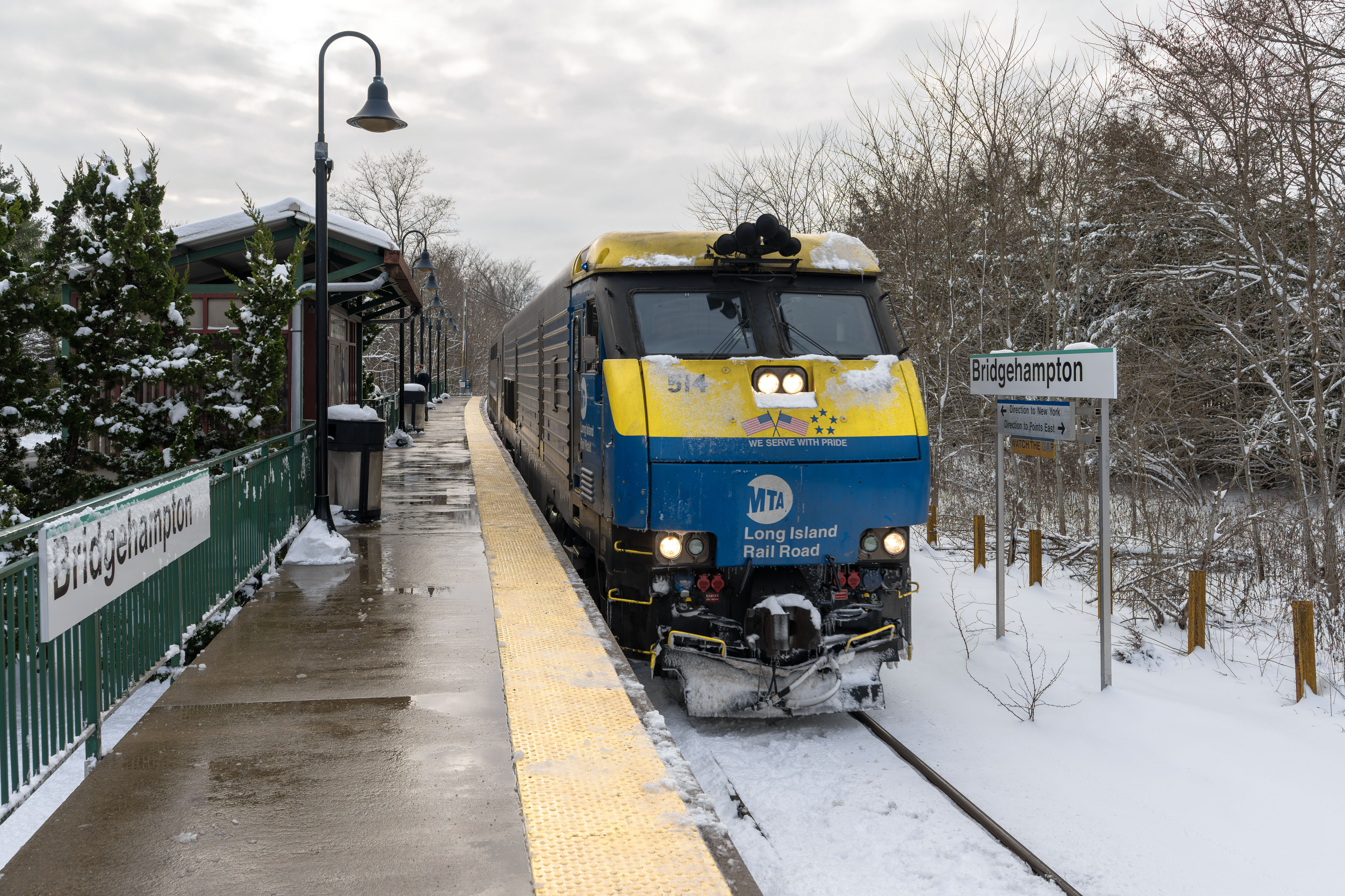
- A train arriving at the platform in 2025

General information
- Location: Maple & Butter Lanes; Bridgehampton, New York
- Coordinates: 40.939163°N 72.309646°W
- Owner: Long Island Rail Road
- Platforms: 1 side platform
- Tracks: 2

Construction
- Parking: Yes
- Cycle facilities: Yes
- Accessible: Yes

Other information
- Station code: BHN
- Fare zone: 14

History
- Opened: 1870
- Rebuilt: 1884, 1968, 2001

Passengers
- 2012—2014: 57 (average weekday)
- Rank: 115 of 125

Services
| Preceding station | Long Island Rail Road | Following station |
|---|---|---|
| Southampton toward Penn Station or Long Island City | Montauk Branch limited service | East Hampton toward Montauk |
| Southampton toward Penn Station | Cannonball summers only | East Hampton toward Montauk |
Former services
| Preceding station | Long Island Rail Road | Following station |
|---|---|---|
| Water Mill toward Long Island City | Montauk Division | Wainscott toward Montauk |
| Water Mill toward Manorville | Sag Harbor Branch | Noyack Road toward Sag Harbor |
Location

Bridgehampton is a station along the Montauk Branch of the Long Island Rail Road. It is located at Maple Lane and Butter Lane, in Bridgehampton, New York.

== History ==
Bridgehampton station opened in June 1870 for the Sag Harbor Branch, and was burned to the ground on July 6, 1884. Another station replaced it the same year, and on June 1, 1895 it began to serve the Montauk Extension. The Sag Harbor Branch was abandoned on May 3, 1939. The station was closed between 1958, and January 1959, and was razed in May 1964. In 1968, the station was replaced with a shelter, and a high-level platform was built in the late 1990s.

== Station layout ==
The station has one six-car-long high-level side platform on the south side of the main track; a siding is on the north side of the main track.
