= Water Mill station =

Former train station in New York, US

Water Mill
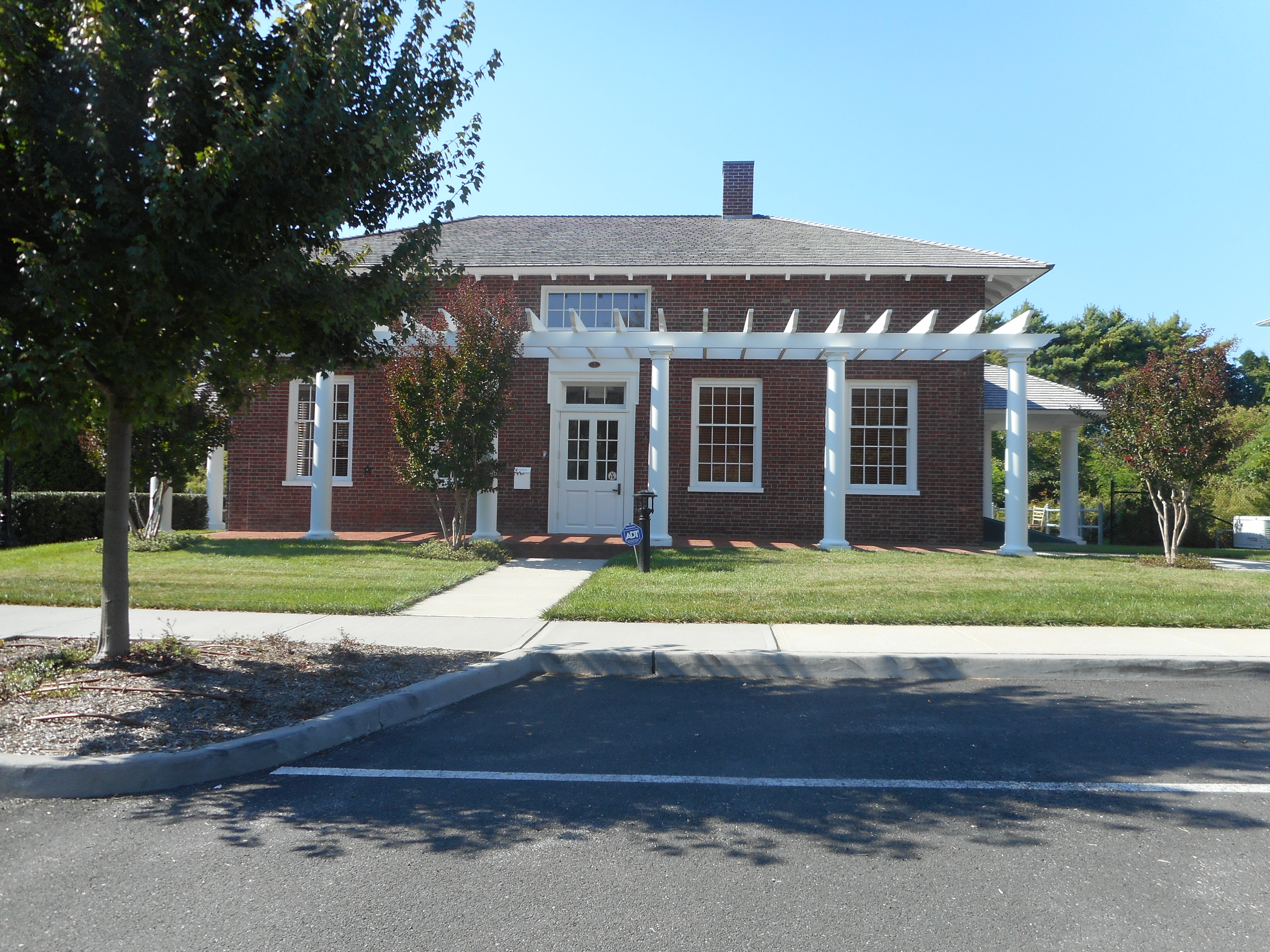
- The old Water Mill LIRR station, still being used today

General information
- Location: Station Road, off Montauk Highway (NY 27); Water Mill, New York
- Coordinates: 40°54′45.1″N 72°21′11″W
- Owner: Strough Associates; Long Island Rail Road (former)
- Platforms: 1 side platform
- Tracks: 1

History
- Opened: 1875
- Closed: 1968
- Rebuilt: 1903

Former services
| Preceding station | Long Island Rail Road | Following station |
|---|---|---|
| Southampton toward Long Island City | Montauk Division | Bridgehampton toward Montauk |
| Southampton toward Manorville | Sag Harbor Branch | Bridgehampton toward Sag Harbor |
Location

Water Mill (also called Watermill) is a former station on the Montauk Branch of the Long Island Rail Road. It was located at the end of a dead-end street off Montauk Highway within the hamlet of Water Mill, in Suffolk County, New York, United States.

== History ==
The Water Mill station originally opened 1875 on the west side of Halsey Lane (now Old Mill Road), and served the Sag Harbor Branch. On June 1, 1895, the Long Island Rail Road built the Montauk Extension east of Bridgehampton, New York, transforming the line into the Montauk Branch. The station was moved to its current site in August 1903, and had a connecting road along the line to Deerfield Road which was eliminated sometime after the station was closed, but has since been rebuilt as the former station and surrounding land was converted (in the early 2010s) into an office complex. The station was closed in the 1940s, but continued to be used as a stop until 1968.

Unlike the station house at the nearby Bridgehampton station, which was razed in 1964 and replaced with a shelter in 1968, the former station house at the Water Mill station continues to stand well after it was closed by the Long Island Rail Road, and operated as a restaurant for much of the late 20th Century. By the late 2010s, it was serving as the office of a series of office condominiums.

== See also ==
- History of the Long Island Rail Road
- List of Long Island Rail Road stations
- Sag Harbor station
