= Cannonball (LIRR train) =

Seasonal train in New York

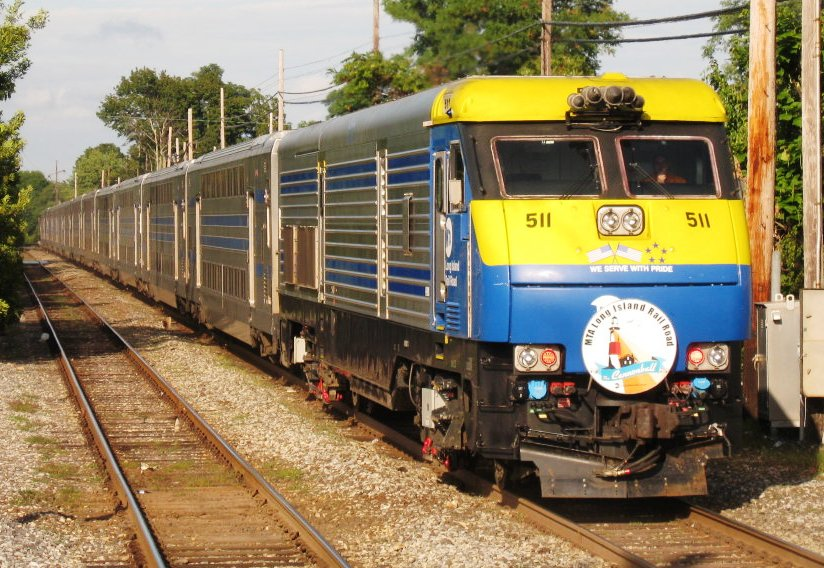
- The Cannonball passing through Bay Shore in 2008

Overview
- Service type: Commuter rail
- Locale: Long Island
- First service: 1899 (as Cannon Ball)
- Current operator: Long Island Rail Road

Route
- Termini: New York City; Montauk, New York
- Stops: 6 (eastbound); 9 (westbound)
- Distance travelled: 118.0 miles (190 km)
- Average journey time: 2 hours, 41 minutes (eastbound); 2 hours, 51 minutes (westbound)
- Service frequency: Weekly; Eastbound on summer Fridays; Westbound on summer Sundays
- Train numbers: 16 (eastbound); 6017 (westbound)

On-board services
- Class: Unreserved coach seating
- Seating arrangements: Coach seating (2 by 2)
- Baggage facilities: Overhead racks

Technical
- Rolling stock: DM30AC locomotives; C3 coaches
- Track gauge: 4 ft 8 1/2 in (1,435 mm) standard gauge
- Track owners: Amtrak (Penn Station to Harold Interlocking); LIRR (east of Harold Interlocking)

The Cannonball is a seasonal named train operated by the Long Island Rail Road between Penn Station in New York City and Montauk on the east end of Long Island, New York. The train operates weekly between Memorial Day and Labor Day weekend, operating eastbound on Fridays and westbound on Sundays, with westbound service also being offered through Columbus Day weekend. The train utilizes dual-mode DM30AC locomotives and C3 coaches – the same rolling stock as other LIRR diesel and dual-mode trains – and takes slightly less than three hours to travel the 118-mile (190 km) route.

The Cannonball first ran in 1899 between Long Island City and Montauk, running express along the Main Line to Manorville, where its consist was split to also provide service to Greenport. (Note: Although the train's consist split at Manorville, no station stop was scheduled there.) It was one of several named trains providing express service between New York and eastern Long Island. Direct service from Manhattan began in 1911 after Penn Station was opened, and by 1934, the train permanently adopted its present-day route along the Montauk Branch. The Cannonball was briefly eliminated in 1949 due to budget cuts, though was reinstated the following year and began operating with diesel locomotives. The train's western terminus was changed to Jamaica in 1951 and to Hunterspoint Avenue in 1961.

In the 1960s, parlor car service was expanded, and for several years, the Cannonball comprised exclusively parlor cars. The train operated with parlor cars for much of its history, and earned a reputation for its party scene and affluent customers. The train has also been known for its speed and quicker travel time compared to other trains on the branch, though its popularity has often resulted in overcrowding. Parlor cars were retired after 1999 and most special service aboard the train was discontinued after 2019, though the train remains one of the MTA's premier services, especially on holiday weekends. Since 2013, the Cannonball has had a western terminus of Penn Station, and the eastbound train has run nonstop between Penn Station and Westhampton. The Cannonball is the only LIRR train to retain its historic name to the present day.

== History ==
=== Cannon Ball and Sunrise Special (1899–1930) ===
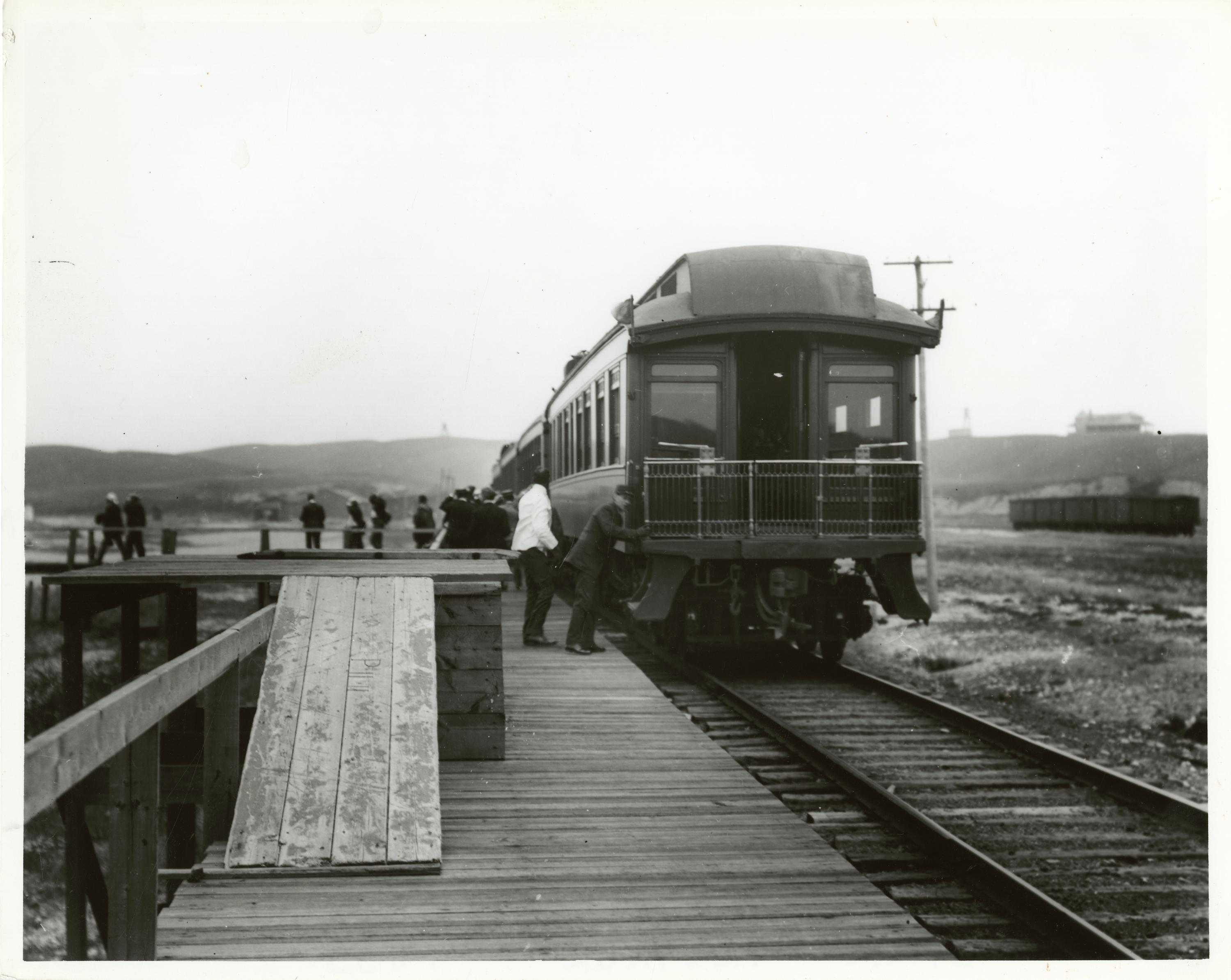
Inaugural westbound run of the Cannon Ball from Montauk in 1899

Seasonal express trains from New York City to the South Fork began operation in the 1870s, with service to Sag Harbor commencing shortly after the now-abandoned Sag Harbor Branch was completed in 1870. Railroad entrepreneur Austin Corbin thereafter sought to expand train service to Montauk as part of a plan to establish Fort Pond Bay as a port of entry for New York, from which passengers could travel to the city by train in two hours; he was among the first to conceive of express trains between the city and Montauk. Although Corbin's plan ultimately did not come to fruition, the railroad extension between Bridgehampton and Montauk was completed in 1895. The name Cannon ball – which has been attributed to Corbin – was first used informally for a South Fork-bound express train, which was officially known as the Shelter Island and Hamptons Express, around 1893. It also described an express train to Greenport by 1895, in addition to other limited-stop trains.

Four years later, on June 9, 1899, the Cannon Ball Express was officially inaugurated. It ran between Long Island City and either Montauk or Greenport. This service pattern had the train's consist split at the now-closed Manorville station: one section would continue via the Main Line to Greenport, while the other would travel via the Manorville Branch to join the Montauk Branch at Eastport, thereafter continuing to Montauk. Under its original service pattern, the train operated eastbound on Friday and Saturday afternoons and westbound on Saturday and Monday mornings. The Montauk-bound train ran nonstop between Long Island City and Westhampton, skipping Jamaica and all other intermediate stops as it does today. By 1905, trains in both directions added stops at Jamaica, and by 1909, also added stops at Speonk. The Greenport-bound Cannonball ran nonstop between Jamaica and Riverhead.

The Cannonball's western terminal was shifted to New York Penn Station in summer 1911, following the station's inauguration in late 1910, to provide a one-seat ride between Manhattan and the Hamptons. It operated with a DD1 electric locomotive through the East River Tunnels, which was swapped with a steam locomotive east of the tunnel portals, as steam exhaust was prohibited in the tunnels. Beginning in 1927, the locomotive swap was instead done at Jamaica, reducing travel times by 5–8 minutes.

In summer 1922, the LIRR renamed the train as the Sunrise Special. Between Memorial Day and Columbus Day, service was operated eastbound from Penn Station to Montauk on Friday afternoons and westbound on Monday mornings, with bidirectional Monday–Saturday service during July and August. At this time, the train consisted entirely of Pullman cars. By 1927, the name Cannon Ball was again used for the train departing late Friday afternoons and serving both Montauk and Greenport, while the name Sunrise Special was given to a newly-inaugurated early afternoon Montauk Branch train.

=== LIRR decline and regrowth (1930–1965) ===
Beginning in 1934, the Cannonball was operated as a single train between New York City and Montauk via the Montauk Branch; the consist was no longer split at Manorville and service to Greenport was instead provided on a separate train. At this time, the railroad also introduced full dining car service on the Monday morning Cannonball, an upgrade over buffet parlor car service, which was believed to be inadequate service for customers leaving the Hamptons early Monday mornings. With the train's new routing, several stops were added to the Cannonball's run in response to requests from town officials, including Patchogue and Center Moriches. The same groups also opposed the addition of stops further west, as they felt the train would lose its value as an express service.

During and after World War II, the LIRR faced financial troubles; it declared bankruptcy and implemented a number of service cuts in 1949, including elimination of the Cannonball express service later that year. In place of the westbound train, the railroad ran a train making additional stops and without special coaches, and no alternative service was provided to replace the eastbound train. The removal of the Cannonball sparked outcry and protests from commuters, who highlighted that it was the only express train – a "crack train" – to and from the East End. After several hearings following commuters' complaints, the Cannonball was reinstated on January 30, 1950; it began utilizing diesel locomotives instead of steam locomotives to comply with an order from the Interstate Commerce Commission to reduce coal usage. Later that year, on June 12, 1950, the first of the railroad's new C-liner locomotives made its maiden run on the Cannonball.

One year later, the railroad retired its electric locomotives as a cost-saving measure, thereby eliminating direct service between Penn Station and non-electrified territory that utilized locomotive swaps, as steam and diesel locomotives were not allowed into Penn Station due to ventilation concerns. The Cannonball was cut back to Jamaica, requiring passengers traveling from Penn Station to transfer at Jamaica from a connecting electric multiple unit train to the diesel-powered Cannonball. Additionally, the Cannonball – then the only evening train running east past Speonk – no longer made stops between Jamaica and Westhampton beginning in 1952, obliging Hamptons-bound travelers from intermediate communities to seek alternate means of transportation.

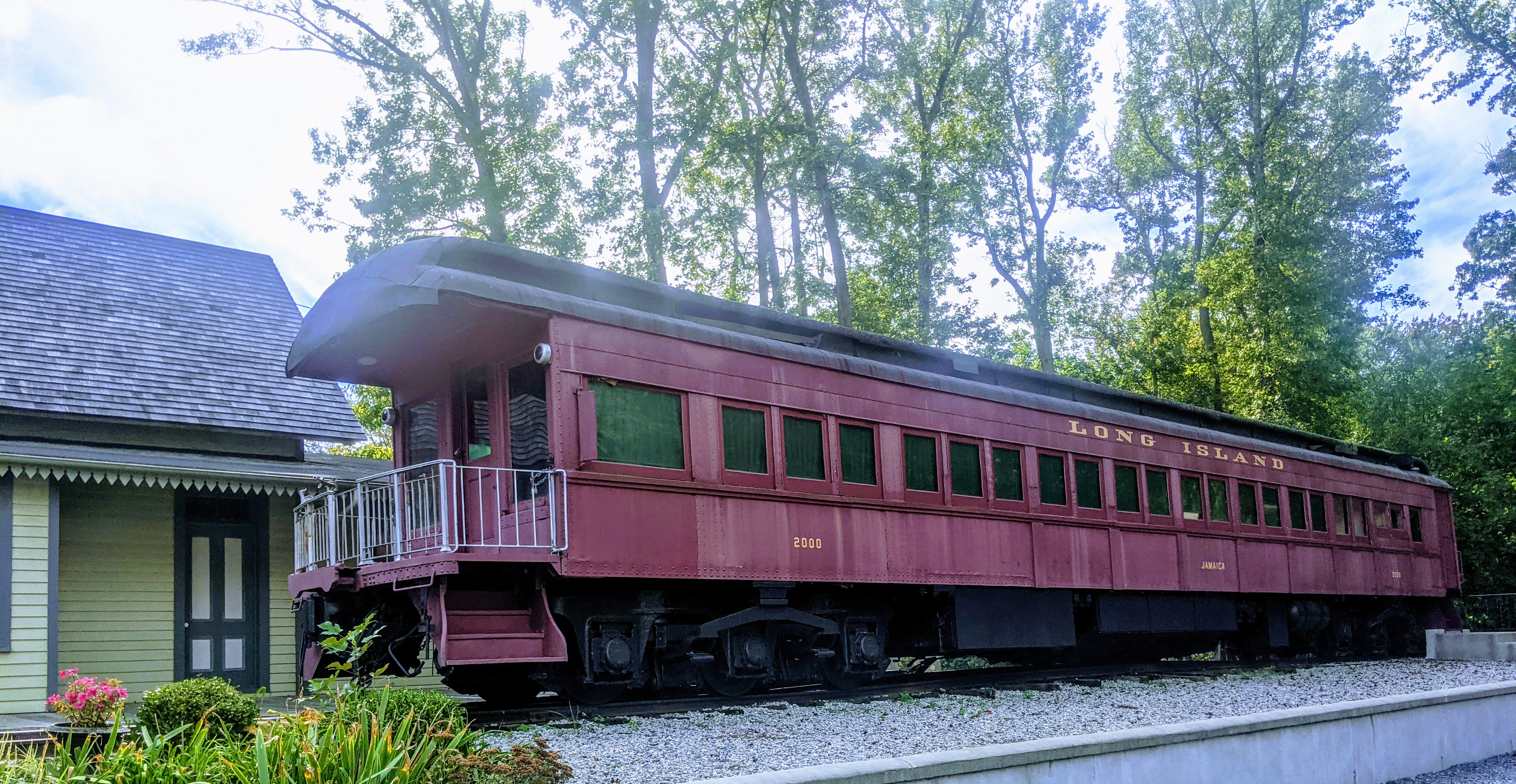
"Jamaica", a parlor car used on the Cannonball, preserved at the Wantagh Railroad Complex

In February 1953, amid bankruptcy, the LIRR sought to cease operations on the Montauk Branch east of Patchogue and operate bus service in its place. It cited low, predominantly non-commuter ridership, proximity to the Main Line (at least as far east as Riverhead), and potential savings of $450,000 per year, which included track maintenance costs to run trains such as the Cannonball. The Town of East Hampton protested this proposed closure, highlighting the potential for increased vehicular traffic due to lack of alternative means of travel. The railroad began to recover from bankruptcy in 1954 and the Montauk Branch remained operational. During the subsequent revitalization of the railroad, new rolling stock was acquired, including air-conditioned coaches, to replace its decades-old predecessors.

During the 1950s and 1960s, the name Cannonball also referred to the sole off-season express train between New York City and the Hamptons, which was also rumored to be threatened with service cuts. Beginning in summer 1961, the western terminus of the Cannonball was changed from Jamaica to Hunterspoint Avenue, eliminating the need for some passengers traveling to or from Manhattan to change at Jamaica. The following year, the train was operated entirely with parlor cars, which offered roomettes and full dining car service. Parlor car tickets were more expensive than standard railroad fares, favoring a wealthier demographic. Previously, the train had operated with both standard-fare coaches and parlor cars. Historically, the train has been known for its parlor car service and party scene (in which cocktails were served); ridership on the train has been accordingly perceived as a status symbol. The train's popularity, which grew considerably during the 1960s, also meant that it would frequently draw in larger crowds than it could seat.

=== MTA takeover (1965–2013) ===
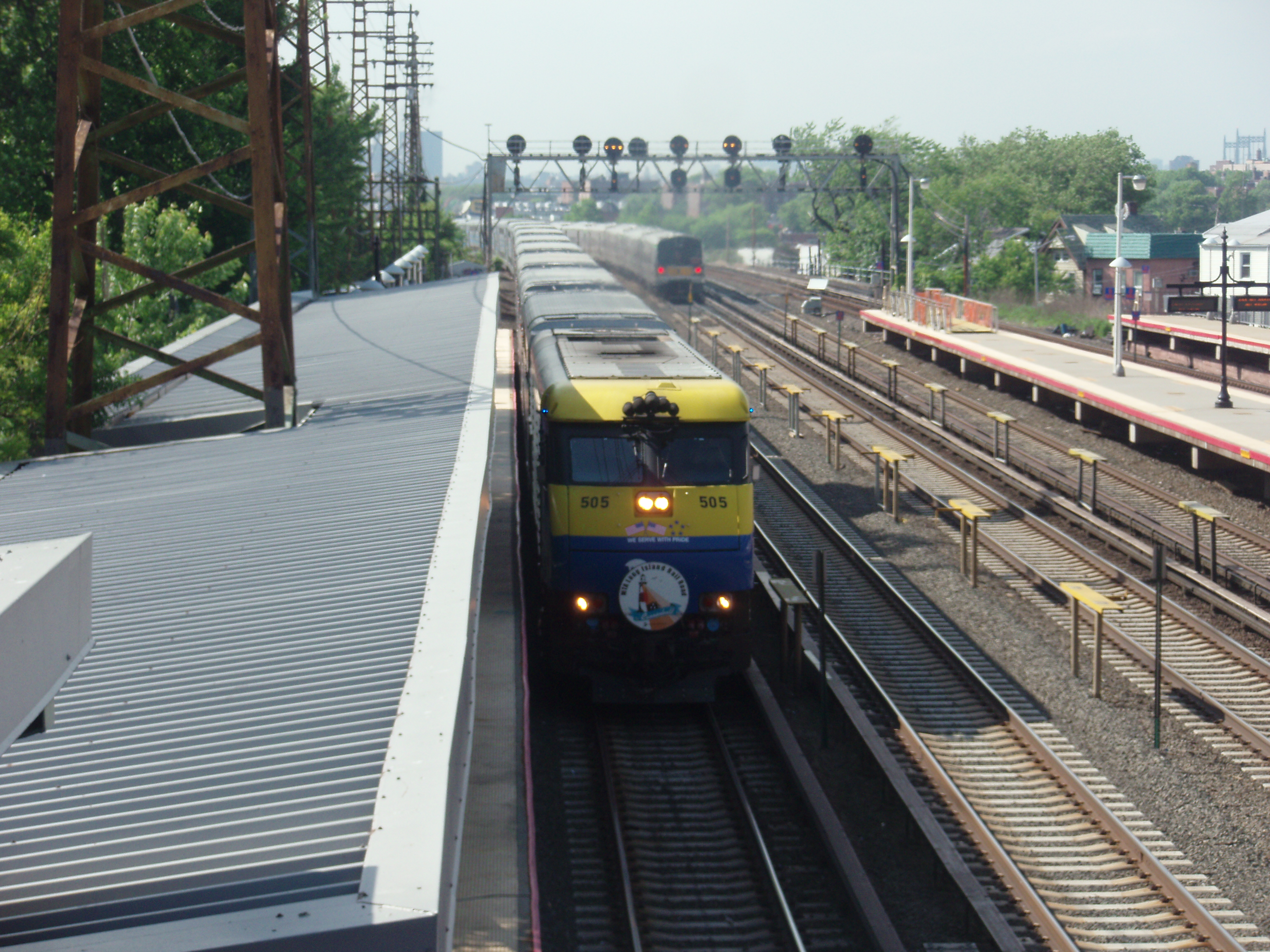
An eastbound Cannonball passing through Woodside in 2009

The Cannonball began utilizing new equipment acquired from Kansas City Southern Railway, and introduced advanced reservations for seats for an additional fee, in the late 1960s. Throughout the 1960s and 1970s, the Cannonball continued to utilize exclusively parlor cars in its consist, including an observation car – the last such car on any regularly scheduled train in North America. The Cannonball operated with as many as 18 cars, requiring it to make two or even three stops at each station because only eight cars could platform at a time. Railroad Director of Special Services Walter McNamara stated in 1972 that the Cannonball was the only all-parlor car train in the United States. Within the next few years, the railroad reinstated regular coach seating on the Cannonball, while continuing to provide parlor car service for an additional fee. During the late 1970s, the segment of the Montauk Branch between Speonk and Montauk was rehabilitated, which allowed the Cannonball to offer a total Manhattan–Montauk travel time of less than three hours, a 40-minute reduction compared to previous timetables. This enabled the railroad to remain competitive with the newly-established Hampton Jitney bus service, which began operations in 1974 to provide an alternative means of transportation to and from the Hamptons, and by the 1980s, expanded operations into New York City. Four seasonal Friday trains, including the Cannonball, continued operating with parlor cars – which were growing in popularity – alongside regular coaches through the 1990s. The Cannonball was the most popular train for weekend getaways to the East End.

Between 1998 and 2000, the LIRR retired its entire fleet of diesel-hauled coaches (Note: The LIRR also retired its old diesel locomotives and replaced them with the EMD DE30AC and DM30AC fleet.) – parlor cars and P72 and P75 coaches – and replaced them with double-decker C3 coaches. The new rolling stock did not include any bar cars; some riders felt this had eliminated the party scene common aboard the train in previous years. The retirement of parlor cars has also been considered a symbol of decreasing popularity of rail travel, especially among the wealthy. Beginning in 2001, the LIRR instead offered a Hamptons Reserve service, which included advanced seating reservations, bar service to passengers in their seats, and special luggage storage, at a premium over the standard ticket price. Hamptons Reserve service was offered in two cars, with the remainder of the train having unrestricted seating. Seat reservations were unique to the Cannonball's Hamptons Reserve cars and were not offered on any other LIRR train; various passengers described "relaxing" rides in contrast to overcrowding in the nonreserved cars. For several years, the train's nonreserved cars also offered bar service, though without extra attendants and catering. At the time, the railroad advertised its summer service on the Montauk Branch – including the Cannonball – for its speed, despite its lack of frequent service. Railroad travel has allowed travelers to avoid peak traffic, especially on the Long Island Expressway and New York State Route 27, though customers seeking more frequent service have preferred the Hampton Jitney, and air travel (both by plane and helicopter, which offer a one-way travel time of roughly an hour) has become a popular alternative for affluent customers since the 1980s.

=== Dual-mode service (2013–present) ===
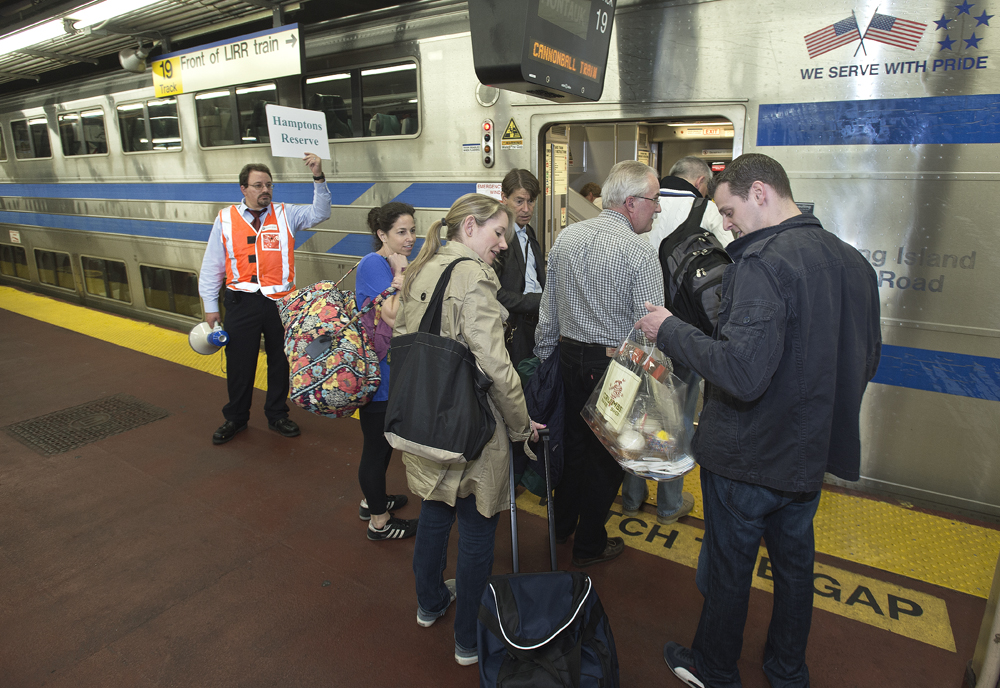
The boarding of a Hamptons Reserve car of the Cannonball at Penn Station on its inaugural run from there on May 24, 2013

The western terminus of the Cannonball was changed from Hunterspoint Avenue to Penn Station, with the train utilizing dual-mode DM30AC locomotives, beginning in summer 2013. This change also eliminated the stop at Jamaica from the Cannonball's eastbound run, with the train running nonstop between Penn Station and Westhampton, and having a scheduled travel time of 94 minutes between those points. MTA officials expressed that Penn Station was better equipped to handle large crowds, in contrast to Hunterspoint Avenue and Jamaica, an issue that customers had also reported. The schedule change also brought about a substantial fare increase, however, as its departure time was adjusted to be within the peak pricing period during the afternoon rush hour. At the same time, the MTA introduced the Cannonball West, a Sunday evening train between Montauk and Penn Station running nonstop between Westhampton and Jamaica and also offering Hamptons Reserve service, though on 2026 timetables, only the eastbound train is named the Cannonball.

In the 2013 season, Hamptons Reserve ridership was reported to have more than doubled compared to the previous year. The following year, the LIRR instituted a policy by which refunds for Hamptons Reserve reservations would not be provided after the day before the scheduled trip. MTA officials believed that 20–30% of Hamptons Reserve seats were unfilled, because they were part of multiple-seat bookings by the same customers – "seat hoarding" – which resulted in lost revenue for the MTA and greater difficulty (e.g., longer waitlists) for customers seeking to make reservations aboard the train.

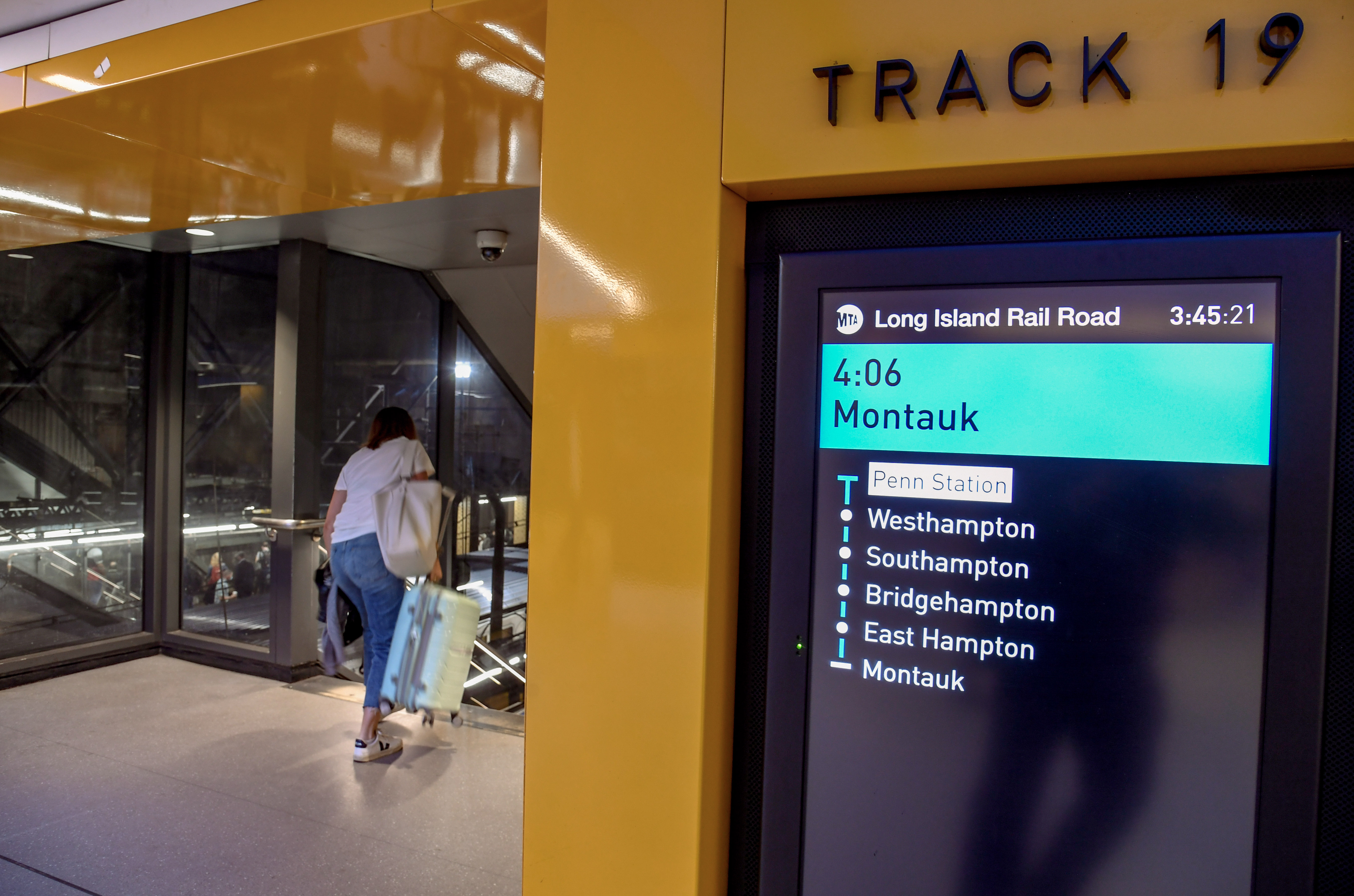
Departure information at Penn Station for the first Cannonball trip of 2021

In 2015, the Federal Railroad Administration investigated concerns of safety due to crowding aboard the Cannonball; some runs of the train were reported to be filled at almost 150% capacity in the non-reserved section. Beginning that season, the LIRR had allocated three cars to Hamptons Reserve service, rather than two, as in previous years. The LIRR responded to these concerns by imposing new restrictions on oversized luggage, effective beginning with the train's run on August 21. Despite these restrictions, excess loading – and thereby passengers not having seats – remained an issue aboard the Cannonball, as well as other Montauk Branch trains during the summer; the MTA reported that it could not augment service on the branch due to operational constraints.

The Cannonball was suspended for the entirety of the 2020 season due to the COVID-19 pandemic. The train resumed operating in 2021; it carried approximately 585 passengers on its first run of the season on Memorial Day weekend. However, Hamptons Reserve service was not reinstated, and thus only unreserved seating has been available aboard the train following its restoration. Although ridership patterns have changed and overall LIRR ridership has not fully recovered following the pandemic, the Cannonball transported roughly 1,575 passengers east on Memorial Day weekend in 2023, a figure comparable to pre-pandemic levels. At the beginning of the 2024 season, the LIRR officially branded its seasonal Thursday afternoon express train, which also runs nonstop from Penn Station to Westhampton en route to Montauk, as the Thursday Cannonball.

== Operation ==
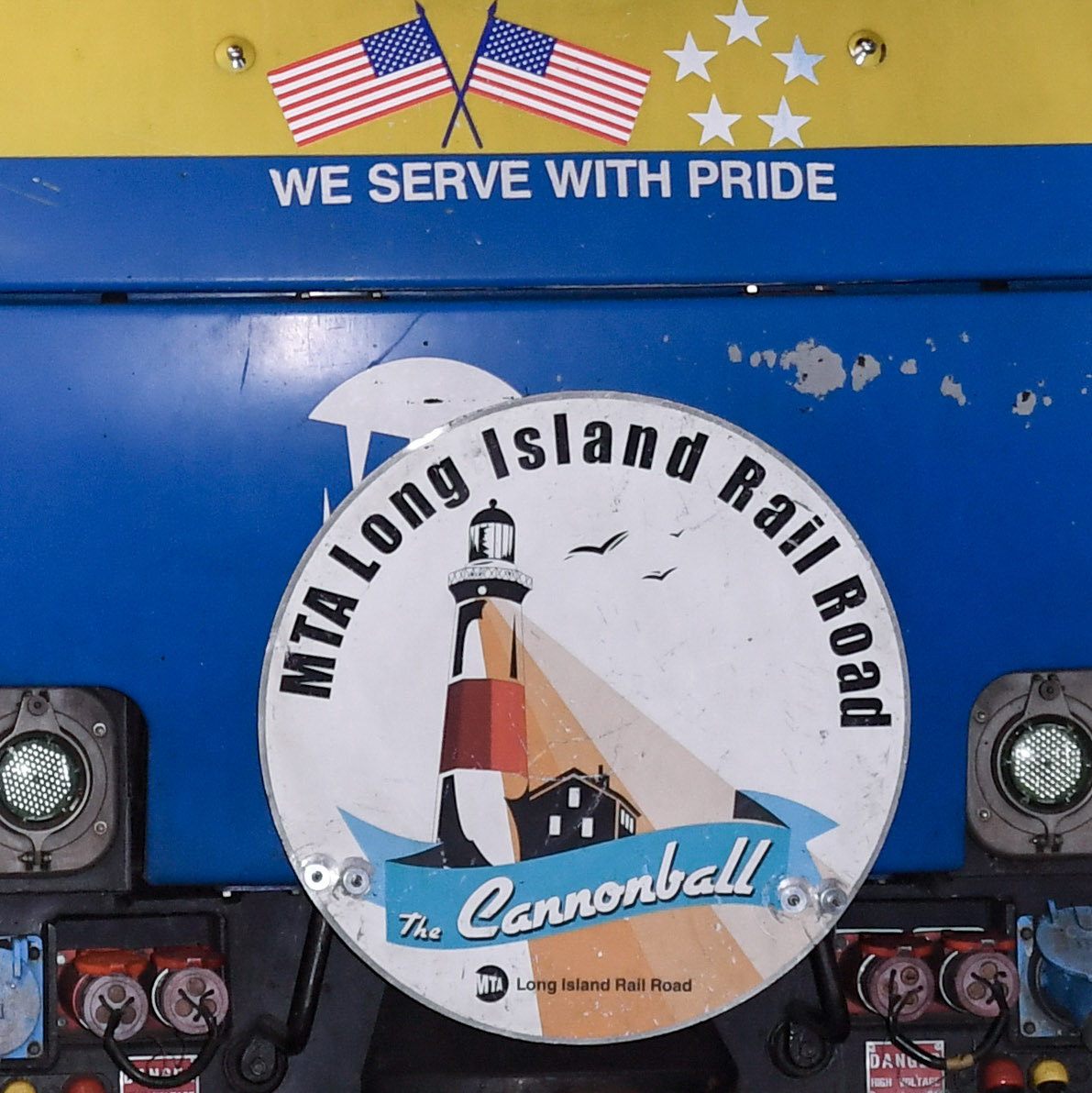
Closeup of the drumhead on the front of the train

=== Equipment ===
The Cannonball train consists of two dual-mode DM30AC locomotives, one on each end of the train, and runs with twelve C3 coach cars eastbound and a standard-length dual-mode set (often eight cars) westbound. This equipment is not unique to the Cannonball; all diesel trains on the Long Island Rail Road have used the same equipment since the fleet was delivered in the late 1990s. The C3 coaches offer 2×2 seating in a split bi-level configuration and have a capacity of 137–143 seated passengers per car. The middle level is used for boarding and alighting – as all LIRR stations have high-level platforms – and offers ADA-accessible seating; odd-numbered cars are also equipped with a lavatory. Because the eastbound Cannonball operates with twelve cars, and most station platforms in the Hamptons are 6–8 cars long, (Note: The exception is Amagansett, whose platform is one and a half cars long, though the eastbound Cannonball does not stop there.) the train makes two stops at each station to allow passengers to alight from all cars. Its schedule builds in two additional minutes for each stop relative to the off-season Friday express train.

Dual-mode LIRR trains such as the Cannonball only use 750 volt DC third rail power near the beginning or end of their runs to travel through the East River Tunnels, rather than for the entirety of their runs along electrified lines. On the eastbound run, the locomotives are switched to diesel power at Woodside station. Going west, the mode switchover occurs at VALLEY interlocking (near Valley Stream station) or QUEENS interlocking (near Elmont–UBS Arena station), before the train arrives at Jamaica station.

=== Route ===
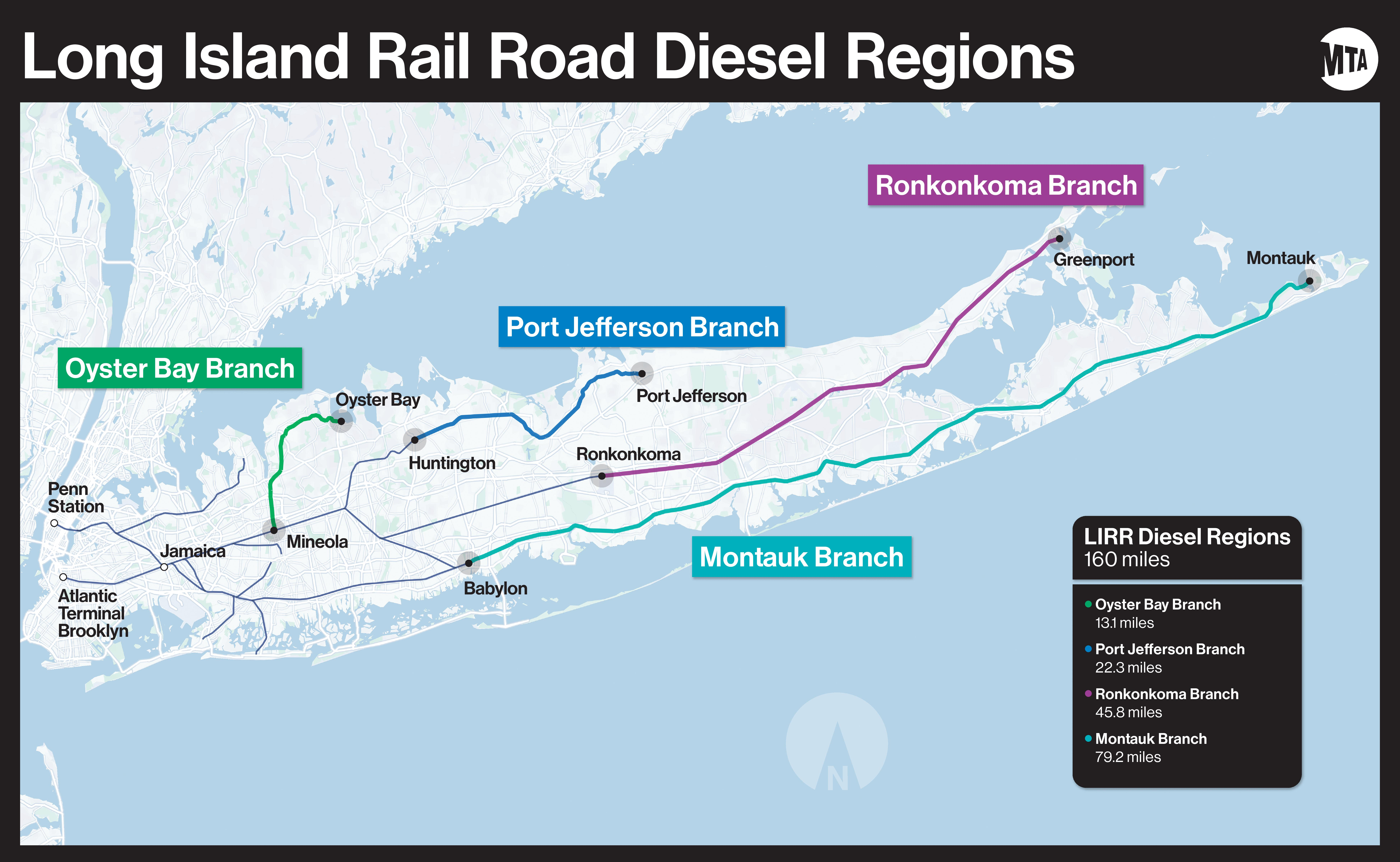
Nearly 80 miles of the Cannonball's 118-mile run are on unelectrified track

The Cannonball utilizes the Main Line between Penn Station and Jamaica. The train then continues to Babylon either via the Montauk Branch or via the Main Line to Bethpage and Central Branch to Babylon, before following the Montauk Branch east to Montauk. East of Y interlocking, located immediately east of Sayville station, the railroad is single-tracked with passing sidings, limiting capacity and schedule flexibility. In the 2010s and 2020s, the Cannonball has usually been routed over the Montauk Branch west of Babylon. Unlike regular Montauk Branch trains, the eastbound Cannonball does not make any intermediate stops between Penn Station and the Hamptons. Thanks to this express segment, the scheduled run time of the Cannonball is 2 hours, 41 minutes. It is scheduled to depart from Penn Station at 4:07 p.m. and arrive at Montauk at 6:48 p.m. Similarly, the Cannonball West, which makes no intermediate stops between Westhampton and Jamaica, has an end-to-end travel time of 2 hours, 51 minutes. These travel times are over 30 minutes shorter than those of some trains that operate year-round and make local stops west of Westhampton. The train reaches a maximum speed of 80 miles per hour (130 km/h) in electrified territory west of Bethpage or Babylon and a maximum speed of 65 miles per hour (105 km/h) in diesel territory, though several curves and interlockings along the route have a lower speed limit. Signalization of the entire Montauk Branch was completed in 2017, allowing the speed limit to be raised east of Speonk.

=== Fare and service ===
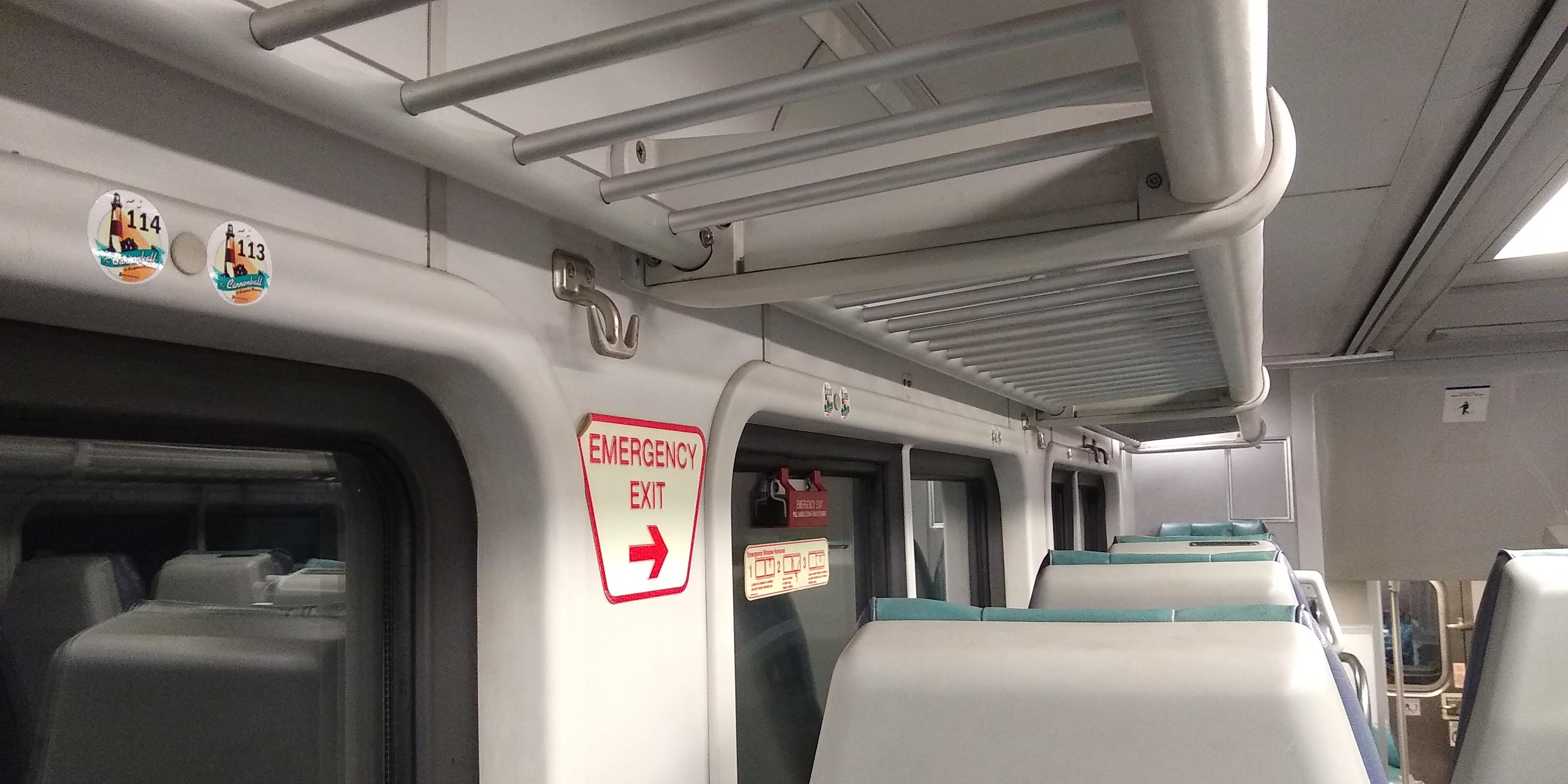
Interior of a C3 car formerly used for Hamptons Reserve service, with stickers enumerating reserved seats

As of June 25, 2024, an adult one-way ticket from Penn Station (Zone 1) to stations in The Hamptons (Zone 14) costs $31.75 (at the ticket machine or MTA TrainTime app) or $38.00 (if purchased onboard the train). Due to the train's departure time during the PM rush hour, peak pricing is in effect. As with all other peak trains and some other seasonal Montauk Branch trains, bicycles are not allowed aboard the Cannonball. Between 2001 and 2019, the Hamptons Reserve Service was a premium service with reserved seating and full bar service in two or three designated cars. (Note: The cars designated for Hamptons Reserve service had lavatories and a reduced capacity of 108 passengers (compared to 137), with the extra space dedicated to amenities such as luggage racks. However, they were otherwise physically identical to the other C3s, and could be operated in regular service without amenities during the off-season.) It was introduced to replace the discontinued parlor cars and cost an additional $20 over the base ticket price. Bar carts were eliminated after the 2018 season, and Hamptons Reserve service has not been offered since 2019, before the pandemic.

The Cannonball operates eastbound on Fridays from Memorial Day weekend through Labor Day weekend inclusive. It also operates on July 3 (the day preceding Independence Day) when that date falls between Monday and Thursday inclusive, though never operates on July 4, as the railroad operates on a weekend schedule that day. On off-season Fridays, as well as summer Thursdays, a similar express train to the Cannonball operates, though that train utilizes a shorter consist. The westbound Cannonball operates on Sundays from Memorial Day weekend through Columbus Day weekend inclusive, as well as on July 4 when it falls between Sunday and Wednesday inclusive, though on Memorial Day and Labor Day weekends, the train operates on Monday rather than Sunday. On summer weekends, a number of other seasonal Montauk Branch trains operate, though their historic names are no longer in use.

== Stations ==
The Cannonball stops at the following stations:

Zone	Municipality	Station	Miles (km) from NYP (Note: Mileage varies depending on the precise route. These numbers assume using the Main Line from New York Penn to Jamaica and the Montauk Branch from Jamaica to Montauk.)	Connections and notes
1	New York City	Penn Station	0.0 (0)	Amtrak (long-distance): Cardinal, Crescent, Lake Shore Limited, Palmetto, Silver Meteor; Amtrak (intercity): Acela, Adirondack, Berkshire Flyer, Carolinian, Empire Service, Ethan Allen Express, Keystone Service, Maple Leaf, Northeast Regional, Pennsylvanian, Vermonter; LIRR: ■ Babylon Branch, ■ Far Rockaway Branch, ■ Hempstead Branch, ■ Montauk Branch, ■ Long Beach Branch, ■ Oyster Bay Branch, ■ Port Jefferson Branch, ■ Port Washington Branch, ■ Ronkonkoma Branch, ■ West Hempstead Branch; NJ Transit: ■ North Jersey Coast Line, ■ Northeast Corridor Line, ■ Gladstone Branch, ■ Montclair–Boonton Line, ■ Morristown Line; NYC Subway: PATH: HOB-33 JSQ-33 JSQ-33 (via HOB); NYC Transit Bus
3	Jamaica, Queens	Jamaica (westbound only)	11.2 (18.0)	LIRR: ■ Atlantic Branch, ■ Babylon Branch, ■ Far Rockaway Branch, ■ Hempstead Branch, ■ Montauk Branch, ■ Long Beach Branch, ■ Oyster Bay Branch, ■ Port Jefferson Branch, ■ Ronkonkoma Branch, ■ West Hempstead Branch; NYC Subway: (at Sutphin Boulevard–Archer Avenue–JFK Airport); NYC Transit Bus; Nassau Inter-County Express Bus; AirTrain JFK
14	Westhampton	Westhampton	76.5 (123.1)	
14	Hampton Bays	Hampton Bays (westbound only)	83.4 (134.2)	Suffolk County Transit Bus
14	Southampton	Southampton	91.5 (147.3)	Suffolk County Transit Bus
14	Bridgehampton	Bridgehampton	96.2 (154.8)	Suffolk County Transit Bus
14	East Hampton	East Hampton	103.1 (165.9)	Suffolk County Transit Bus
14	Amagansett	Amagansett (westbound only)	104.3 (167.9)	Suffolk County Transit Bus
14	Montauk	Montauk	118.0 (189.9)	Suffolk County Transit Bus

== See also ==
- CapeFLYER – A similar service operated by the CCRTA and the MBTA that runs between Boston and Hyannis.
