= Southampton station (LIRR) =

Long Island Rail Road station in Suffolk County, New York

Southampton
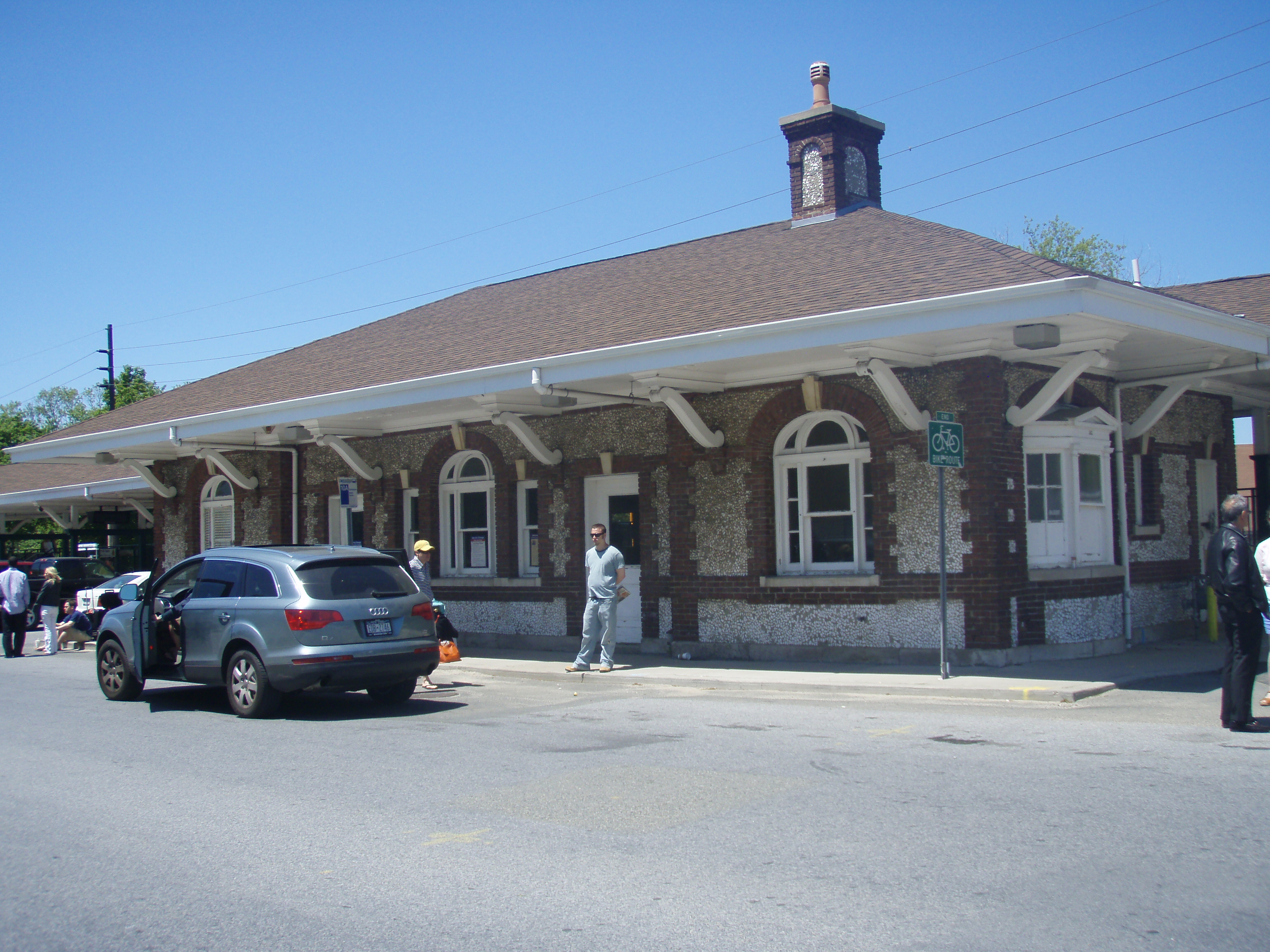
- The landmarked station house at Southampton in 2008

General information
- Location: North Main Street & Powell Avenue; Village of Southampton, New York
- Coordinates: 40.894779°N 72.38975°W
- Owner: Long Island Rail Road
- Platforms: 1 side platform
- Tracks: 3
- Connections: Suffolk County Transit: 92

Construction
- Parking: Yes (free)
- Cycle facilities: Yes
- Accessible: Yes

Other information
- Station code: SHN
- Fare zone: 14

History
- Opened: 1871
- Rebuilt: 1883, 1902

Passengers
- 2012–2014: 72 per weekday
- Rank: 114 of 125

Services
Preceding station	Long Island Rail Road	Following station
Hampton Bays toward Penn Station or Long Island City	Montauk Branch limited service	Bridgehampton toward Montauk
Hampton Bays toward Penn Station	Cannonball summers only	Bridgehampton toward Montauk
Former services
Preceding station	Long Island Rail Road	Following station
Southampton Campus toward Long Island City	Montauk Division	Water Mill toward Montauk
Shinnecock Hills toward Manorville	Sag Harbor Branch	Water Mill toward Sag Harbor
- Southampton Railroad Station
- U.S. Historic district – Contributing property
- Location: Southampton, New York, USA
- Part of: North Main Street Historic District (ID86002730)
- MPS: Southampton Village MRA
- Added to NRHP: October 2, 1986
Location

Southampton is a station on the Montauk Branch of the Long Island Rail Road, located on North Main Street between Prospect and Willow streets within the Incorporated Village of Southampton, in Suffolk County, New York, United States.

== History ==
Southampton station was opened in February 1871, then razed and rebuilt in 1902. The station is part of the village's North Main Street Historic District, which has been on the National Register of Historic Places since 1986. A freight house was also added across the tracks from this station; it was severely neglected, and was ultimately demolished in 2006.

== Station layout ==
The station has one eight-car-long high-level side platform on the south side of the main track. Two siding tracks are on the north side of the main track.
