= Wainscott station =

Former train station in New York, US

Wainscott

General information
- Location: Wainscott, New York
- Coordinates: 40°57′7″N 72°16′1″W
- Owner: Long Island Rail Road (former)
- Platforms: 1 island platform
- Tracks: 2

History
- Opened: c.1897–1898
- Closed: 1938

Key dates
- February 27, 1915: Station depot burns

Former services
Preceding station	Long Island Rail Road	Following station
Bridgehampton toward Long Island City	Montauk Division	East Hampton toward Montauk
Location

Wainscott was a former railroad station on the Montauk Branch of the Long Island Rail Road in Wainscott, New York, United States. It was opened in either 1897 or 1898 by the Brooklyn and Montauk Railroad, rebuilt in 1915 by the LIRR, and closed in 1938.

Wainscott station has the distinction of being the only Long Island Rail Road station to have segregated waiting rooms, in spite of the fact that the New York State Legislature never allowed segregated facilities. Some sources claim that another station was segregated, but this has yet to be confirmed. In early 1938, the station was closed due to the effects of the Great Depression, and was moved to a beach, where it has served as a private residence since then.
