= Amagansett station =

Long Island Rail Road station in Suffolk County, New York

Amagansett
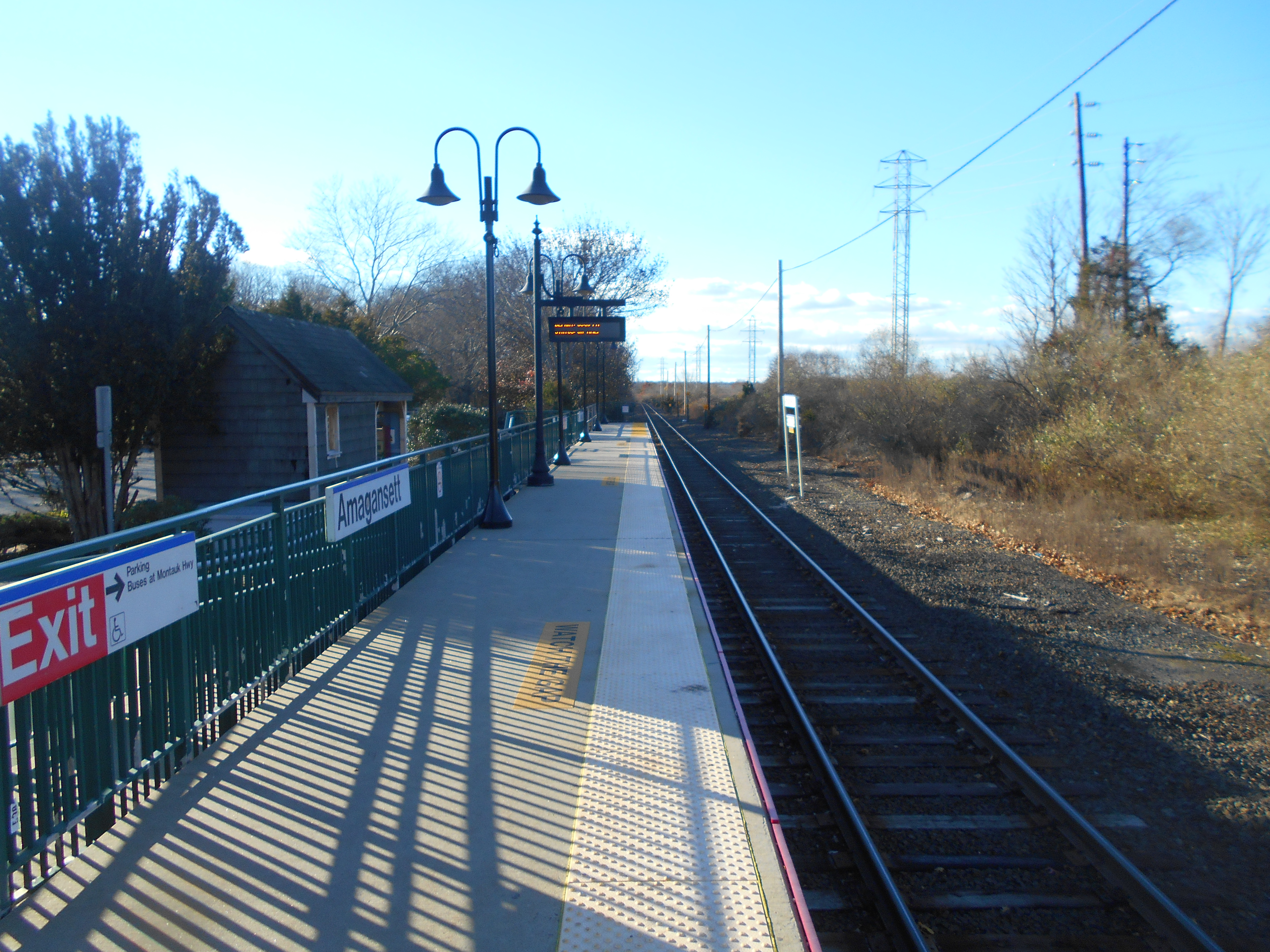
- The platform at Amagansett in November 2014, facing towards East Hampton.

General information
- Location: Main Street & Abrahams Landing Road; Amagansett, New York
- Coordinates: 40.98°N 72.1325°W
- Owner: Long Island Rail Road
- Platforms: 1 side platform
- Tracks: 1

Construction
- Parking: Yes
- Cycle facilities: Yes
- Accessible: Yes

Other information
- Station code: AGT
- Fare zone: 14

History
- Opened: June 1, 1895
- Closed: 1909, 1964
- Rebuilt: 1910, 1965, 2001

Passengers
- 2012—2014: 20 (weekday), 92 (weekend)
- Rank: 122 of 125

Services
Preceding station	Long Island Rail Road	Following station
East Hampton toward Penn Station or Long Island City	Montauk Branch limited service	Montauk Terminus
East Hampton toward Penn Station	Cannonball summers only	Montauk One-way operation
Former services
Preceding station	Long Island Rail Road	Following station
East Hampton toward Long Island City	Montauk Division	Napeague Beach toward Montauk
Location

Amagansett is a station on the Montauk Branch of the Long Island Rail Road, at Main Street (NY 27) and Abrahms Landing Road (former Suffolk CR 33A) in Amagansett, New York.

== History ==
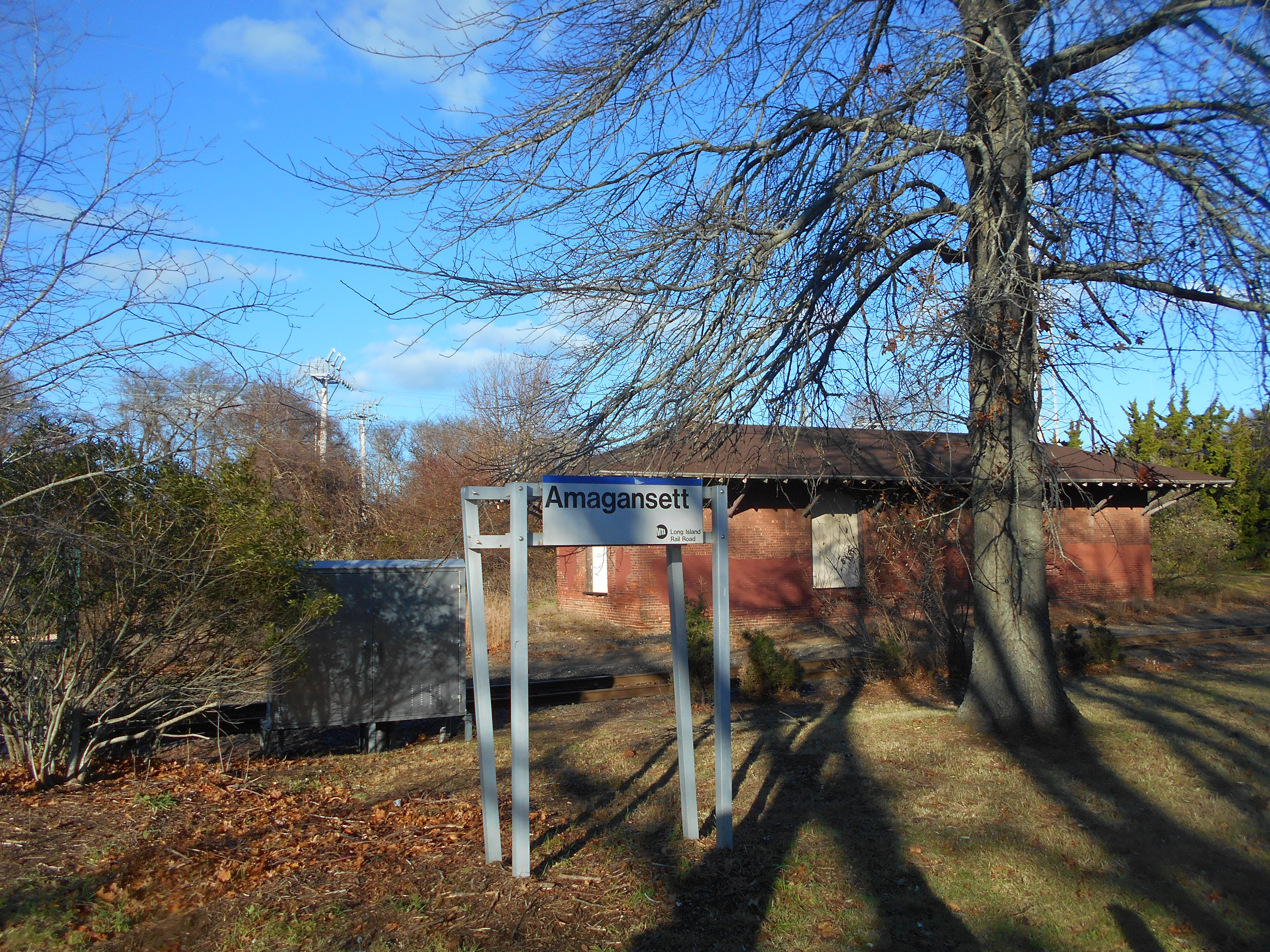
The former freight depot at Amagansett in November 2014

Amagansett station was opened on June 1, 1895, by the Brooklyn and Montauk Railroad, and closely resembled stations such as Sea Cliff and the former East Williston structures, but lacked the second story and gingerbread woodwork trim that these depots contained. It was burned to the ground in 1909, reportedly by a disgruntled LIRR employee. The station was rebuilt on August 15, 1910, in the colonial barn style typical of stations such as Riverhead, Bay Shore, Northport, and Mineola. Until 1929, it had train sheds, a wye, and coal and water dispensing facilities. On June 13, 1942, Nazi saboteurs used Amagansett station en route to New York City for the failed mission known as Operation Pastorius. The station house was closed in 1958 or January 1959, then razed on August 31, 1964, and replaced with a sheltered platform in 1965. The 1895-built former freight house survives, but was abandoned. A high-level platform was added in the late 1990s to accommodate the C3 fleet.

== Station layout ==
This station has one high-level platform on the south side of the single track, long enough for two cars to receive and discharge passengers.
