= Wainscott, New York =

- Hamlet and census-designated place
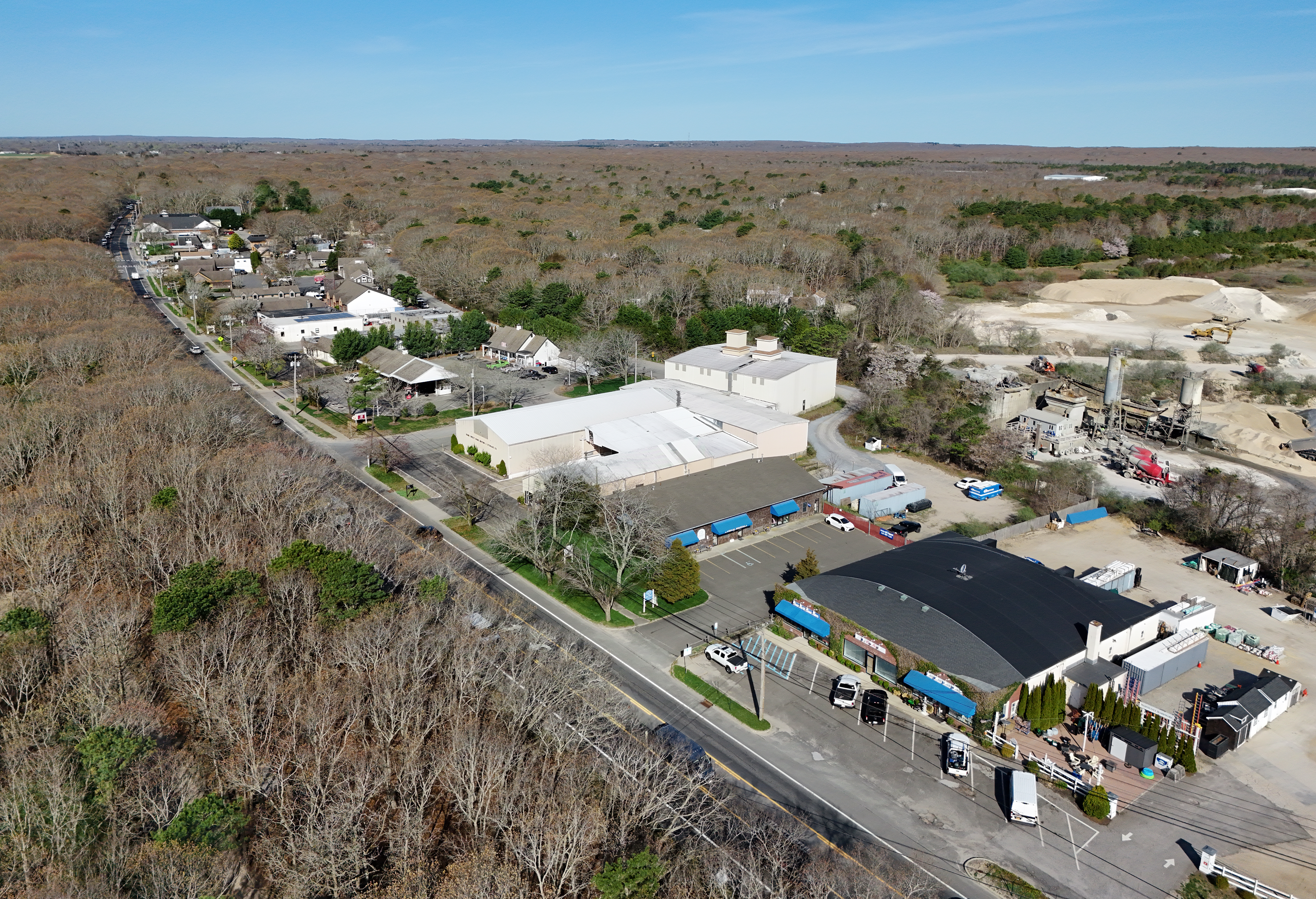
- Aerial view

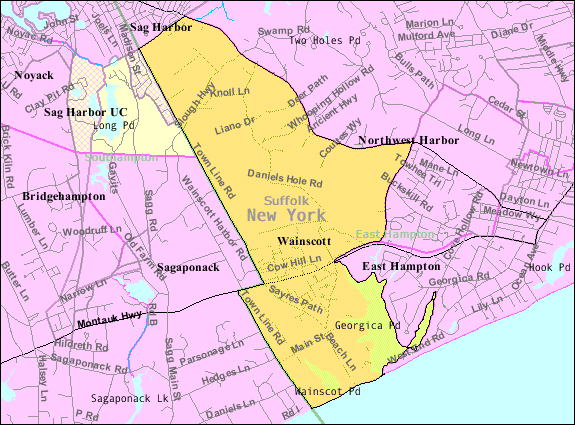

- Location within Long Island Location within New York Location within the United States
- Coordinates: 40°57′9″N 72°14′43″W
- Country: United States
- State: New York
- County: Suffolk
- Town: East Hampton

Area
  - Total: 7.93 sq mi (20.54 km^{2})
  - Land: 6.74 sq mi (17.45 km^{2})
  - Water: 1.19 sq mi (3.09 km^{2})
- Elevation: 23 ft (7 m)

Population (2020)
  - Total: 904
  - Density: 134.2/sq mi (51.81/km^{2})
- Time zone: UTC-5 (Eastern (EST))
  - Summer (DST): UTC-4 (EDT)
- ZIP Code: 11975
- Area code: 631
- FIPS code: 36-77805
- GNIS feature ID: 0968642

Wainscott is a hamlet in the Town of East Hampton in Suffolk County, New York, United States, on the South Fork of Long Island. As of the 2020 census, Wainscott had a population of 904. For statistical purposes, the United States Census Bureau defined a census-designated place (CDP) for the 2000 census that roughly corresponds to the same area.

== Background and history ==
The hamlet was named after Wainscott, Kent, a village north of Maidstone, England, an area immortalized in Charles Dickens' Great Expectations and from which most of the early settlers of East Hampton came.

The Wainscott School, founded in 1730, was the last public one-room schoolhouse operating in New York until an annex was built in 2008.

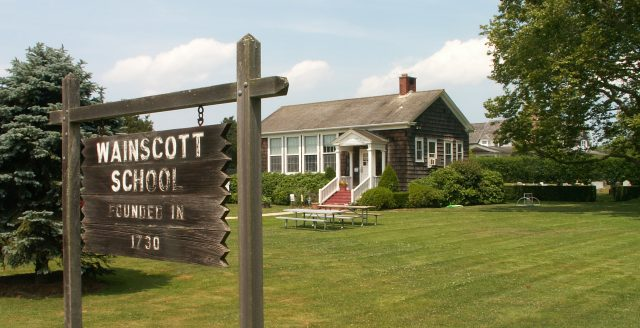
Wainscott School

Wainscott faces the Atlantic Ocean to the south. On its west is the village of Sagaponack, and on the east is the village of East Hampton. Other communities that border Wainscott are the CDPs of East Hampton North and Northwest Harbor to the northeast, the village of Sag Harbor to the north, and the CDPs of Noyack and Bridgehampton to the west (north of Sagaponack).

The eastern side of Wainscott faces Georgica Pond. The exclusive Georgica Association has a 100-acre (0.40 km^{2}) subdivision on the west side of the pond. The Association's most famous house, Kilkare, was built in 1880. It was owned by attorney Michael J. Kennedy, who hosted Donald Trump and Ivana Trump visits for seven years, until representing Ivana in her divorce from Trump. It was the beach house featured in the 2004 film Eternal Sunshine of the Spotless Mind.

The PBS children's show It's a Big Big World is taped in the industrial park at the East Hampton Airport, which is in Wainscott.

The Wainscott railroad station on the Montauk Branch closed in the 1930s.

In 2020, Citizens For The Preservation of Wainscott, a non profit organization, started a petition to incorporate the community. A driving force of the petition was to fight a proposal for the preferred location for the 138-kilovolt electricity transmission line from the South Fork Wind Farm to come ashore in the community at Beach Lane en route to an electrical substation in East Hampton. The petition was denied in 2021 by the East Hampton Town Supervisor, in part for only receiving 19 valid signatures. The organization was represented by Greenberg Traurig

== Geography ==
According to the United States Census Bureau, the CDP has a total area of 7.2 square miles (18.7 km^{2}), of which 6.7 square miles (17.4 km^{2}) is land and 0.50 square miles (1.3 km^{2}), or 6.87%, is water.

Wainscott has a different landscape than East Hampton or Amagansett. The town is flat: houses border on potato or corn fields that then border on the dune and the ocean. Main Street used to have a general store and a post office. The post office eventually moved to a new building on Montauk Highway and the old post office became a private residence. Before 1935, Main Street was lined with sycamores, but the hurricane took them all down.

== Demographics ==
Historical population
Census	Pop.	Note	%±
2020	904		—
U.S. Decennial Census

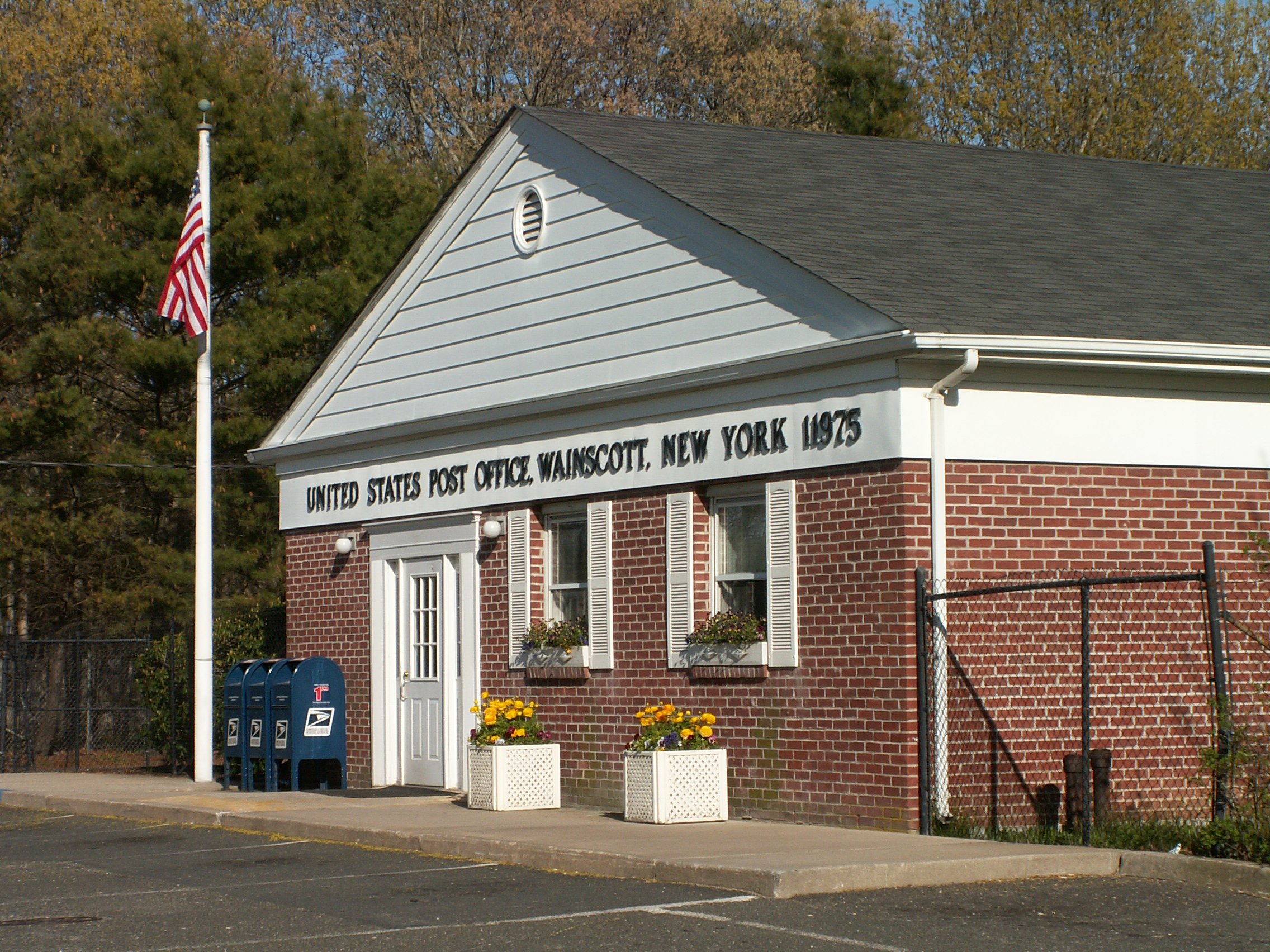
Wainscott Post Office

For statistical purposes, the United States Census Bureau defined a census-designated place (CDP) for the 2000 census that roughly corresponds to the same area as the hamlet.

As of the census of 2010, there were 650 people, 264 households, and 148 families residing in the CDP. The population density was 97.0 inhabitants per square mile (37.5/km^{2}). There were 876 housing units at an average density of 130.7 per square mile (50.5/km^{2}). The racial makeup of the CDP was 93.1% White, 2.3% African American, 1.7% American Indian, 0.5% Asian, 0.9% some other race, and 1.5% from two or more races. Hispanic or Latino of any race were 14.3% of the population.

There were 264 households, out of which 24.6% had children under the age of 18 living with them, 46.2% were headed by married couples living together, 8.0% had a female householder with no husband present, and 43.9% were non-families. 33.0% of all households were made up of individuals, and 13.3% were someone living alone who was 65 years of age or older. The average household size was 2.30, and the average family size was 2.91.

In the CDP, the population was spread out, with 21.7% under the age of 18, 9.4% from 18 to 24, 20.0% from 25 to 44, 28.6% from 45 to 64, and 20.2% who were 65 years of age or older. The median age was 44.1 years. For every 100 females, there were 115.9 males. For every 100 females age 18 and over, there were 108.6 males.

For the period 2007–2011, the estimated median annual income for a household in the CDP was $82,083, and the median income for a family was $79,375. Males had a median income of $64,688 versus $79,167 for females. The per capita income for the CDP was $51,876. About 2.0% of families and 10.3% of the population were below the poverty line, including 4.7% of those under age 18 and 2.3% of those age 65 or over.

Preceded by East Hampton	The Hamptons	Succeeded by Sagaponack
