= East Hampton station =

Long Island Rail Road station in Suffolk County, New York

East Hampton
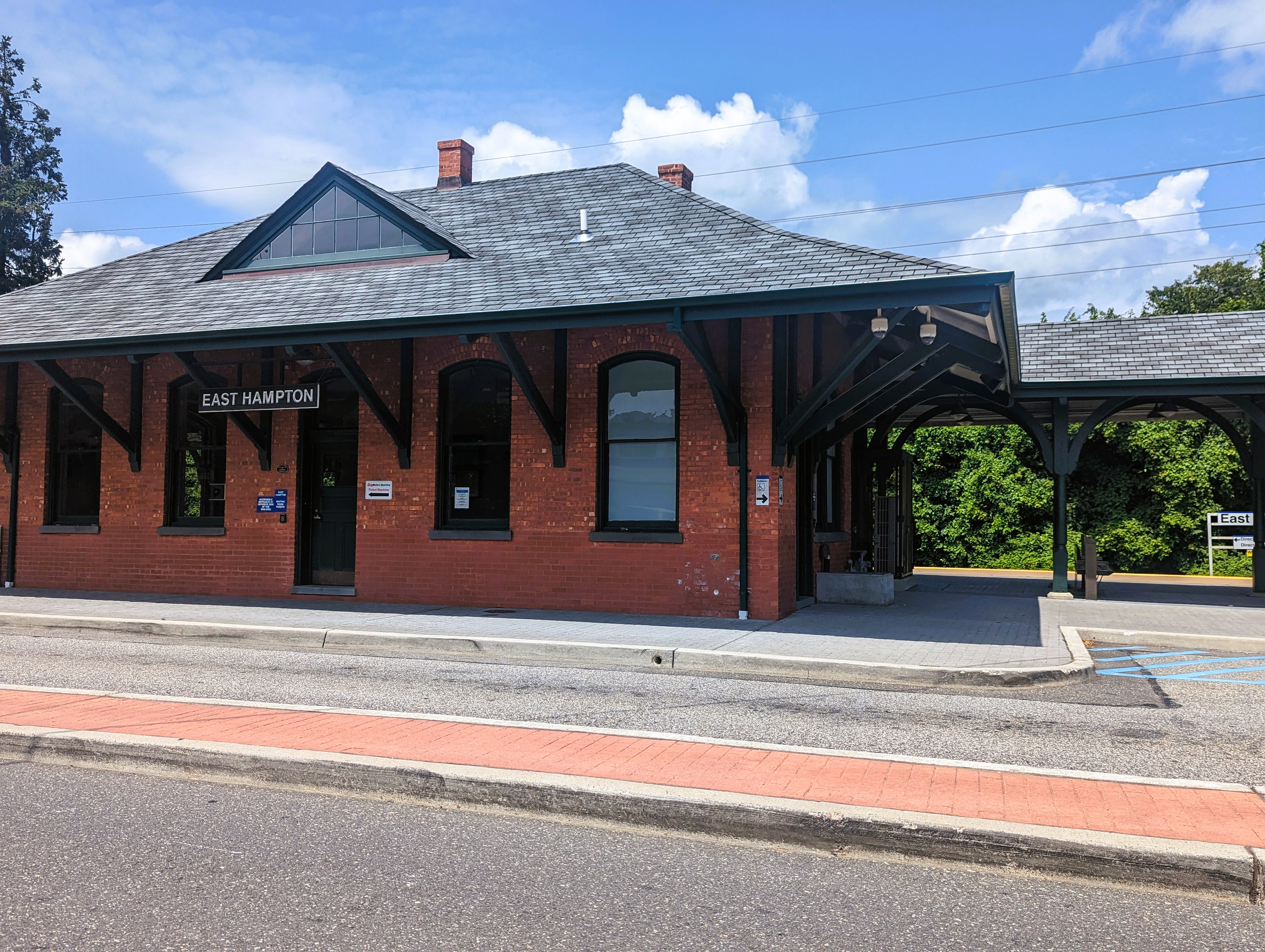
- East Hampton's landmarked station house in 2023, following its restoration

General information
- Location: Railroad Avenue between Newtown & Race Lanes; Village of East Hampton, New York
- Owner: Long Island Rail Road
- Platforms: 1 side platform
- Tracks: 1
- Connections: Suffolk County Transit: 92

Construction
- Parking: Yes
- Cycle facilities: Yes (rack)
- Accessible: Yes

Other information
- Station code: EHN
- Fare zone: 14

History
- Opened: June 1, 1895

Passengers
- 2012—2014: 123 (average weekday)
- Rank: 109 of 125

Services
| Preceding station | Long Island Rail Road | Following station |
|---|---|---|
| Bridgehampton toward Penn Station or Long Island City | Montauk Branch limited service | Amagansett toward Montauk |
| Bridgehampton toward Penn Station | Cannonball summers only | Montauk Terminus |
| Bridgehampton toward Penn Station | Cannonball summers only | Amagansett One-way operation |
Former services
| Preceding station | Long Island Rail Road | Following station |
|---|---|---|
| Wainscott toward Long Island City | Montauk Division | Amagansett toward Montauk |
- East Hampton Railroad Station
- U.S. National Register of Historic Places
- Location: East Hampton, New York, USA
- Coordinates: 40°57′53.77″N 72°11′36.46″W
- Area: 1.7 acres (0.7 ha)
- Built: 1895
- Architect: Woodruff
- Architectural style: Railroad station
- NRHP reference No.: 00000581
- Added to NRHP: June 2, 2000
Location

East Hampton is a station on the Montauk Branch of the Long Island Rail Road, on Railroad Avenue between Newtown Lane and Race Lane, in East Hampton, Suffolk County, New York. Parking is available along Railroad Avenue as far west as King Street. A bus/taxi lane is in front of the station house.

== History ==
The East Hampton station was built in 1895 by the Brooklyn and Montauk Railroad. The original station house remains standing and in use, and it was placed on the National Register of Historic Places on June 2, 2000. In 2005, the building was open only on Sundays.

In October 2017, the MTA announced that it was planning to restore East Hampton station to its original brick structure and green roofline, as part of a $120 million state reconstruction program for 16 LIRR stations in Nassau and Suffolk Counties.

== Station layout ==
The station has one six-car-long high-level platform on the south side of the single track.

== Gallery ==
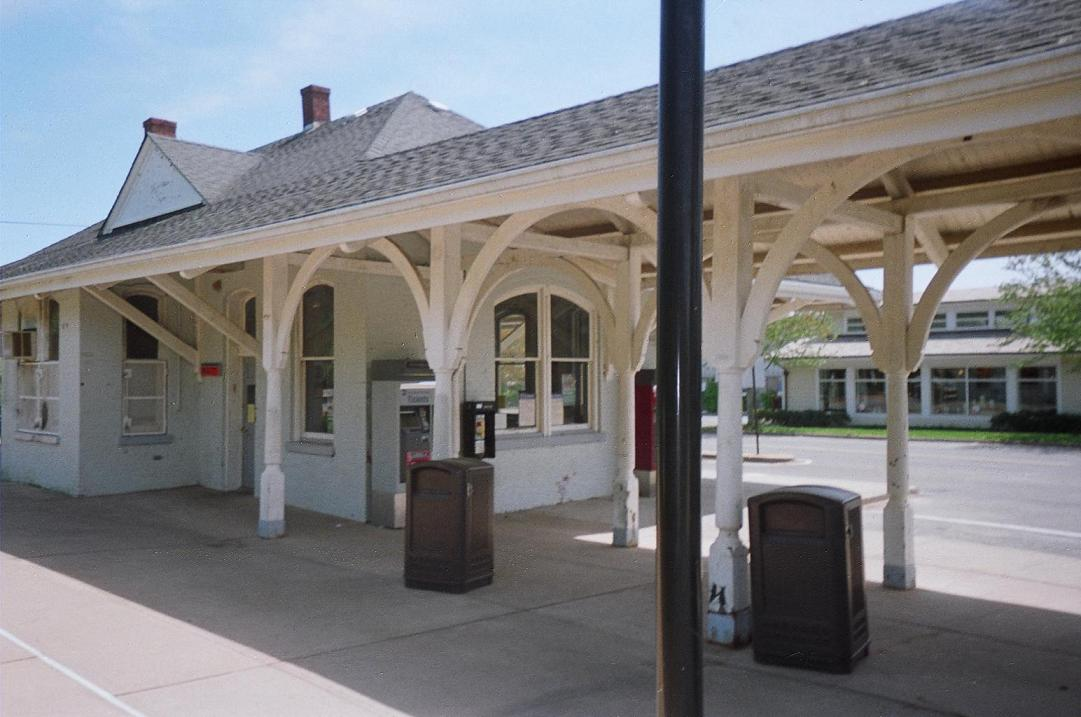
Trackside view of western canopy from the platform prior to its restoration

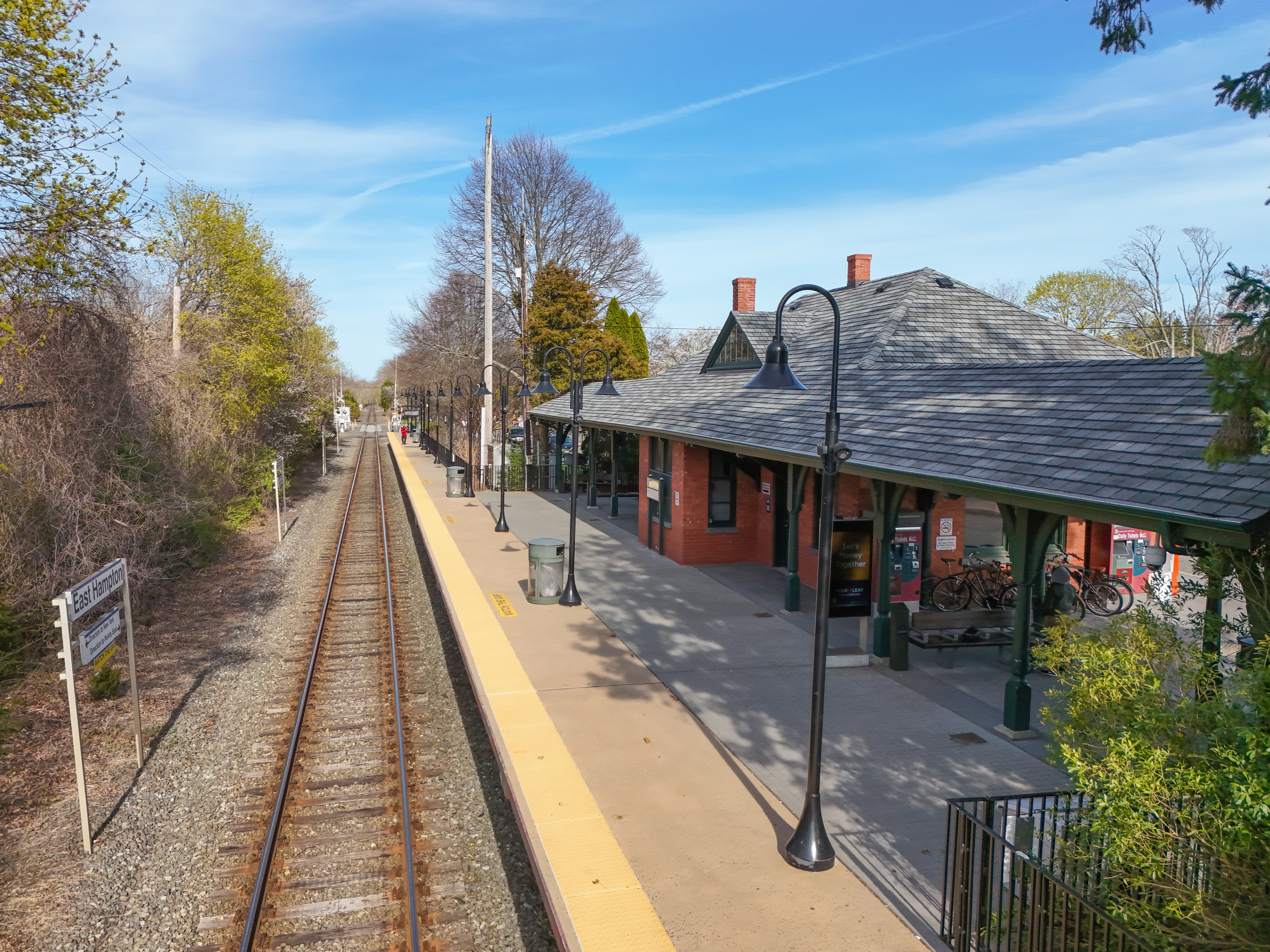
Trackside view post-restoration

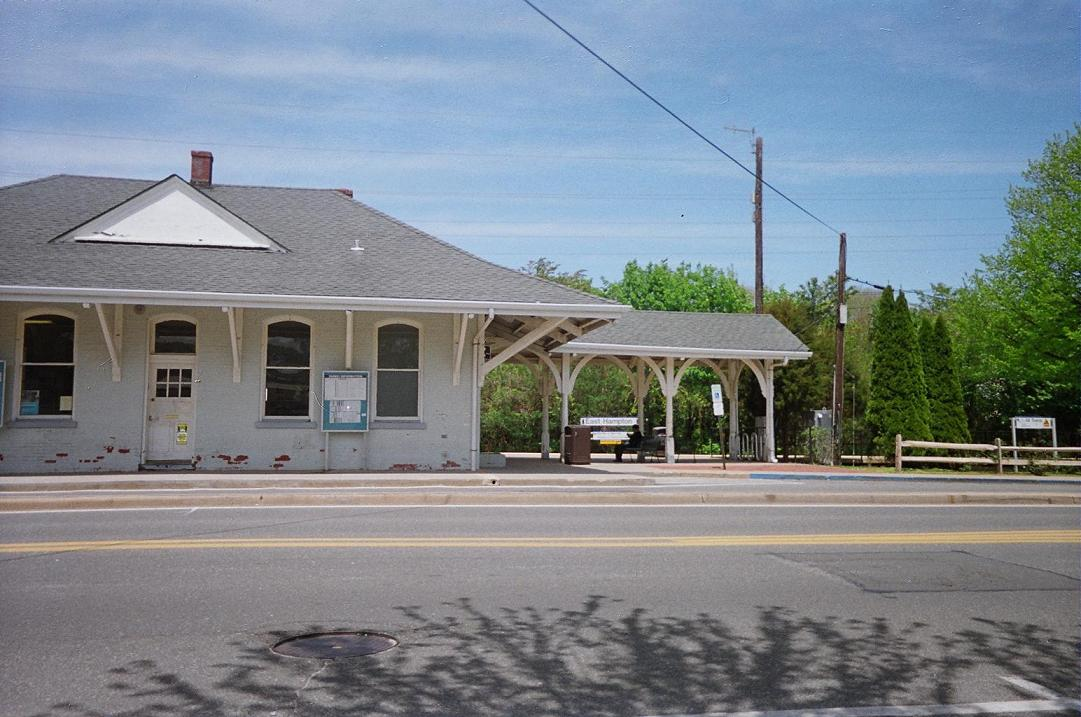
Another street-side view, this time of the eastern canopy prior to its restoration

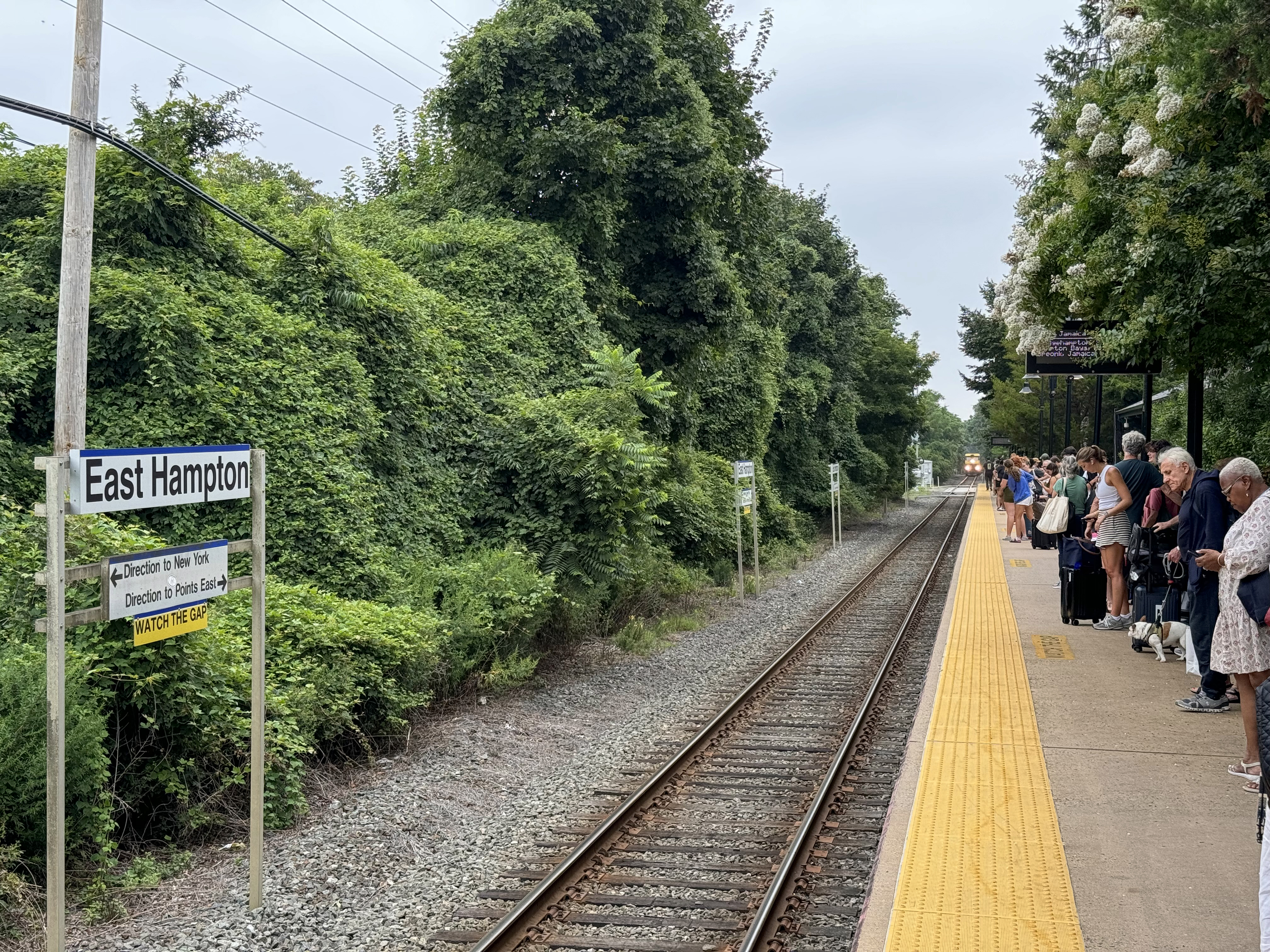
Westbound train arriving
