= Amagansett, New York =

Hamlet in the state of New York, United States

- Hamlet and census-designated place
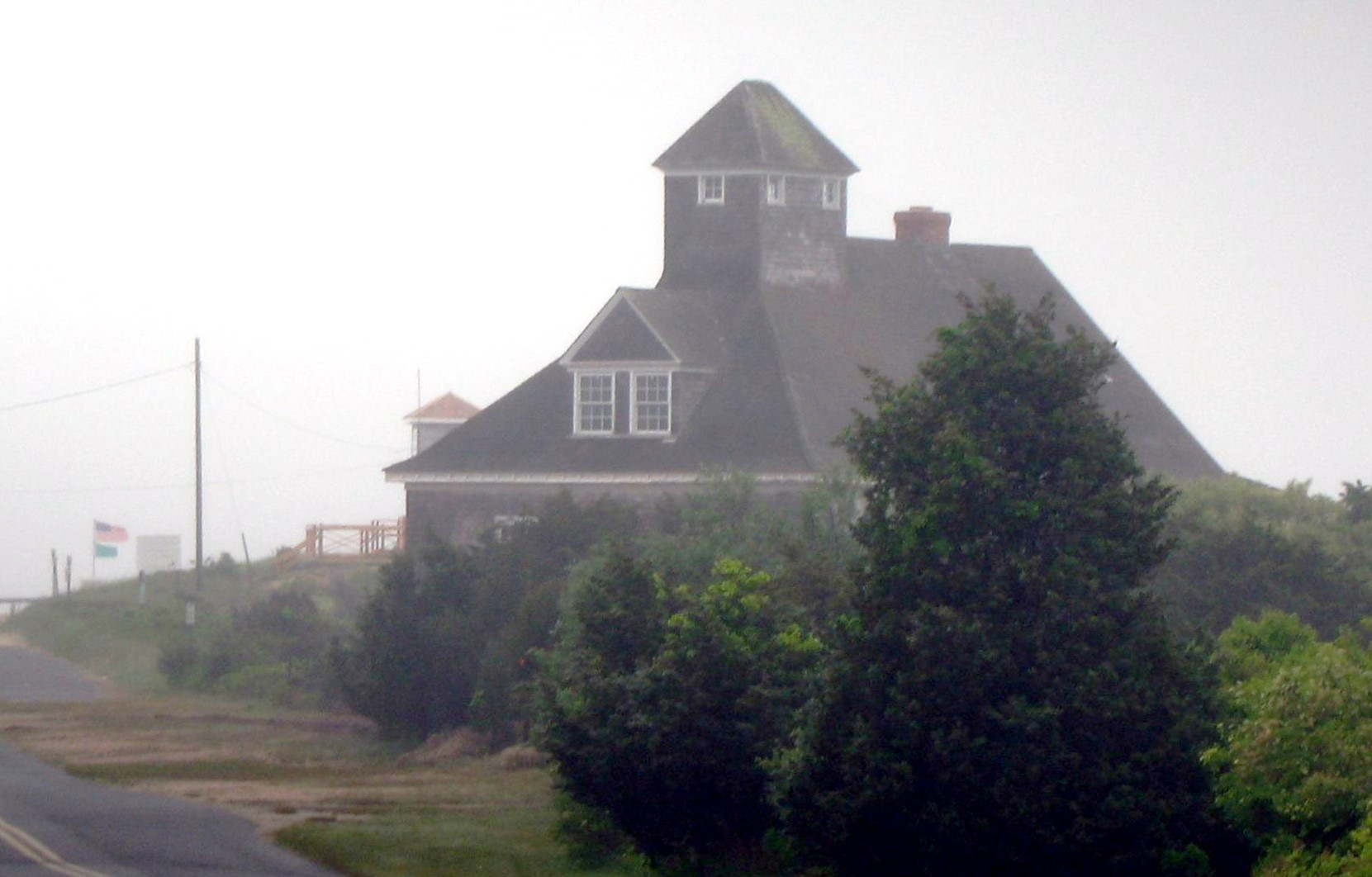
- The Amagansett Coast Guard Station

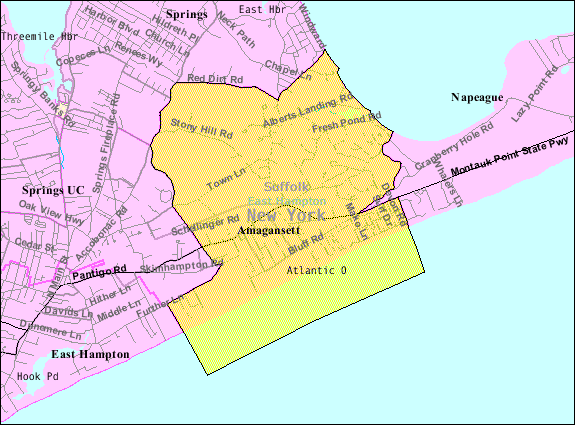

- Location within the state of New York Amagansett, New York (New York) Amagansett, New York (the United States)
- Coordinates: 40°58′46″N 72°7′31″W
- Country: United States
- State: New York
- County: Suffolk
- Town: East Hampton

Area
  - Total: 9.64 sq mi (24.98 km^{2})
  - Land: 6.59 sq mi (17.06 km^{2})
  - Water: 3.06 sq mi (7.92 km^{2})
- Elevation: 30 ft (9 m)

Population (2020)
  - Total: 1,824
  - Density: 277/sq mi (106.9/km^{2})
- Time zone: UTC−5 (Eastern (EST))
  - Summer (DST): UTC−4 (EDT)
- ZIP Code: 11930
- Area code: 631
- FIPS code: 36-01594
- GNIS feature ID: 0942409

Amagansett /ˌæməˈɡænsət/ is a census-designated place that roughly corresponds to the hamlet by the same name in the town of East Hampton in Suffolk County, New York, United States, on the South Shore of Long Island. As of the 2020 census, Amagansett had a population of 1,824. Amagansett hamlet was founded in 1680.

== History ==
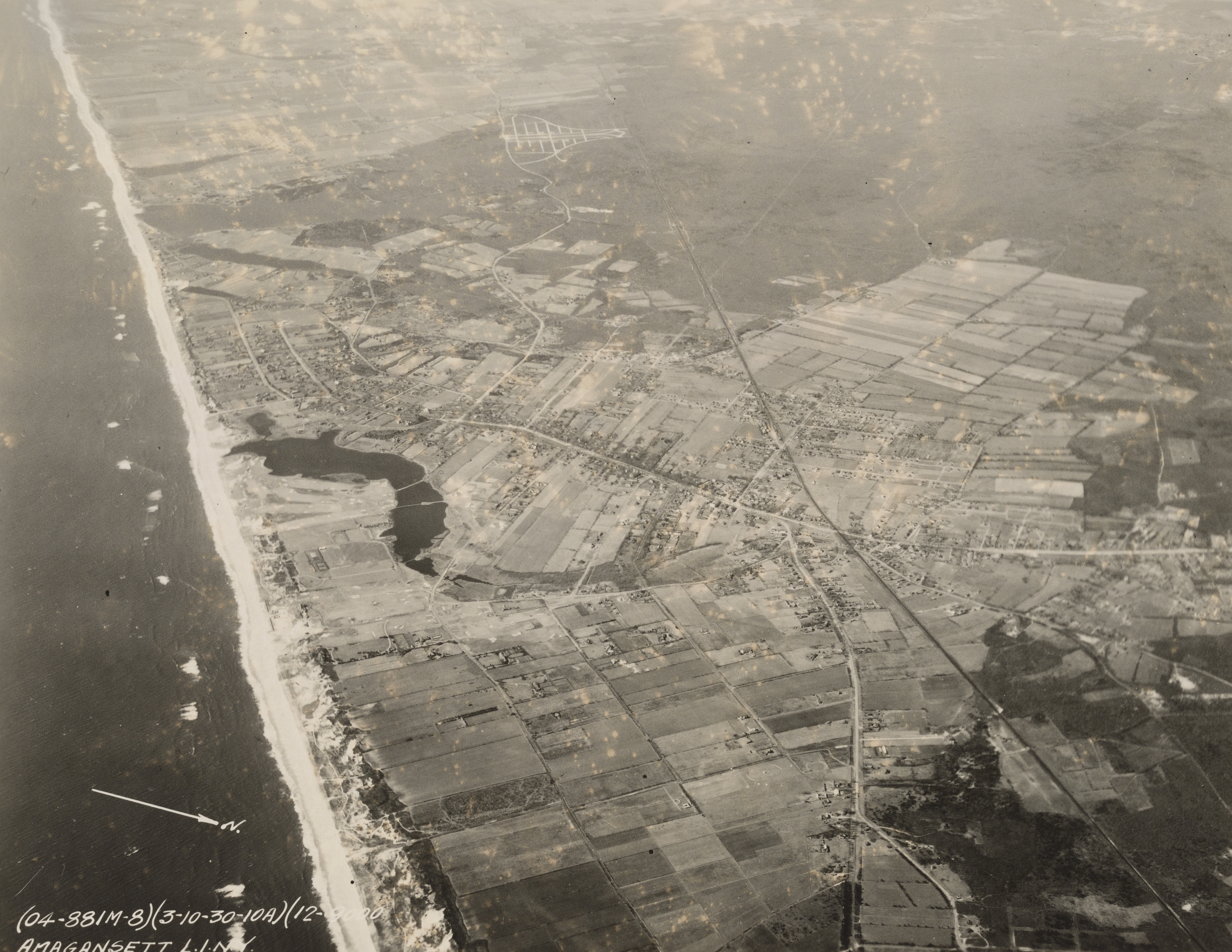
Amagansett in 1931

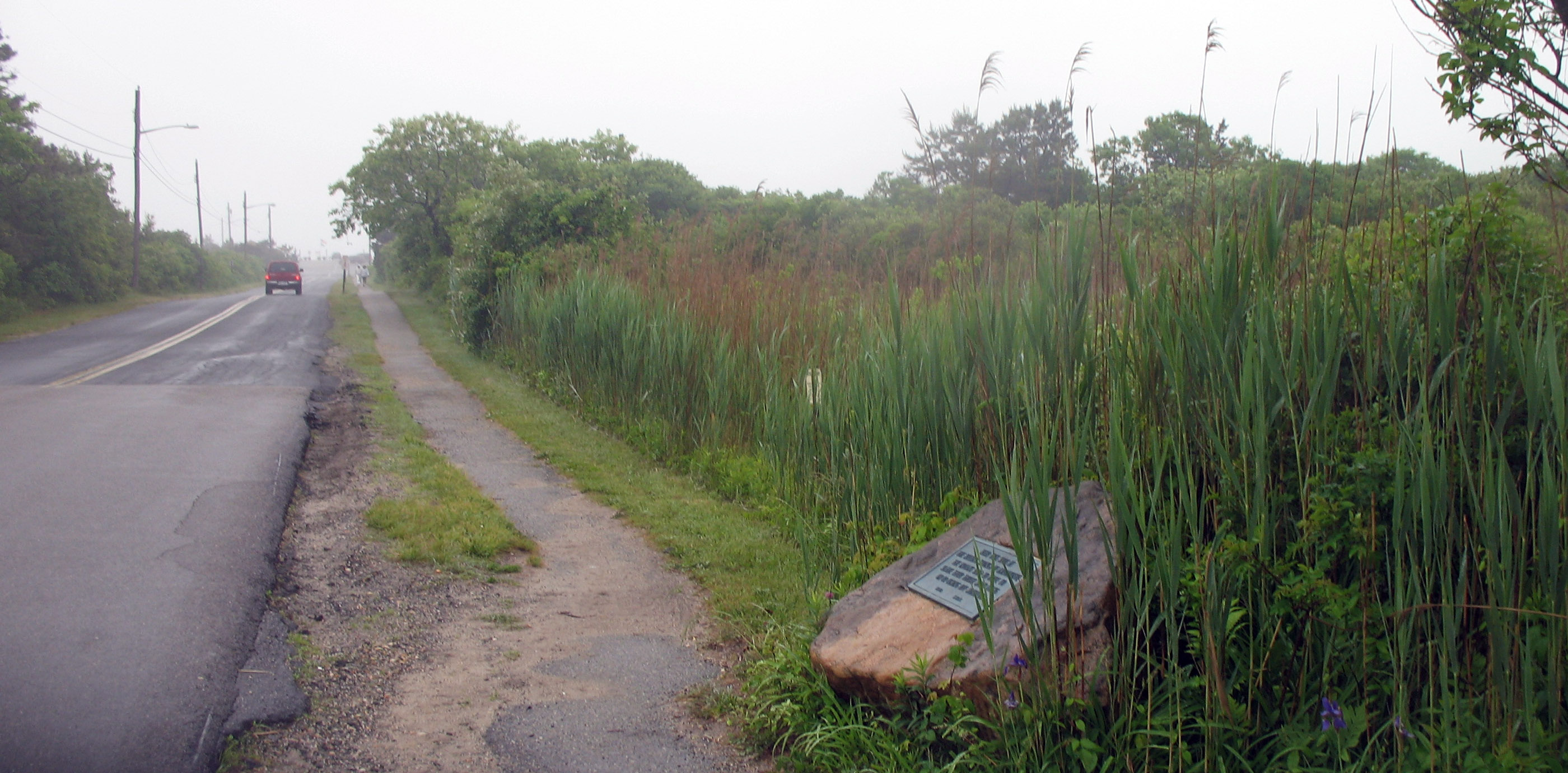
Marker celebrating the Amagansett's "place of good water" near Indian Wells beach

Amagansett derives its name from the Montaukett for "place of good water"—from a water source near what today is Indian Wells beach.

Unlike the rest of the Hamptons, Amagansett was initially settled by the Baker, Conklin, and Barnes families, descendants of English settlers, and the Dutch brothers Abraham and Jacob Schellinger, the sons of a New Amsterdam merchant who moved to East Hampton between 1680 and 1690 after the English took over New Amsterdam.

During Operation Pastorius, a failed Nazi attack on the United States in June 1942, during World War II, a submarine dropped off four German spies on Atlantic Avenue beach in Amagansett, where they made their way to the village's Long Island Rail Road station and boarded a train for New York. A Coast Guardsman assigned to watch the beach noticed the suspicious strangers on the beach and notified the police and the FBI.

In 2007, the original Coast Guard station, which had been moved to a private residence in 1966 to protect it from demolition, was moved back near its original location at Atlantic Avenue beach. The Coast Guard barracks are now part of the East Hampton Town Marine Museum, which includes exhibits from the town's maritime history, including whaling relics and a cannon from the American Revolution ship HMS Culloden, which ran aground at Montauk.

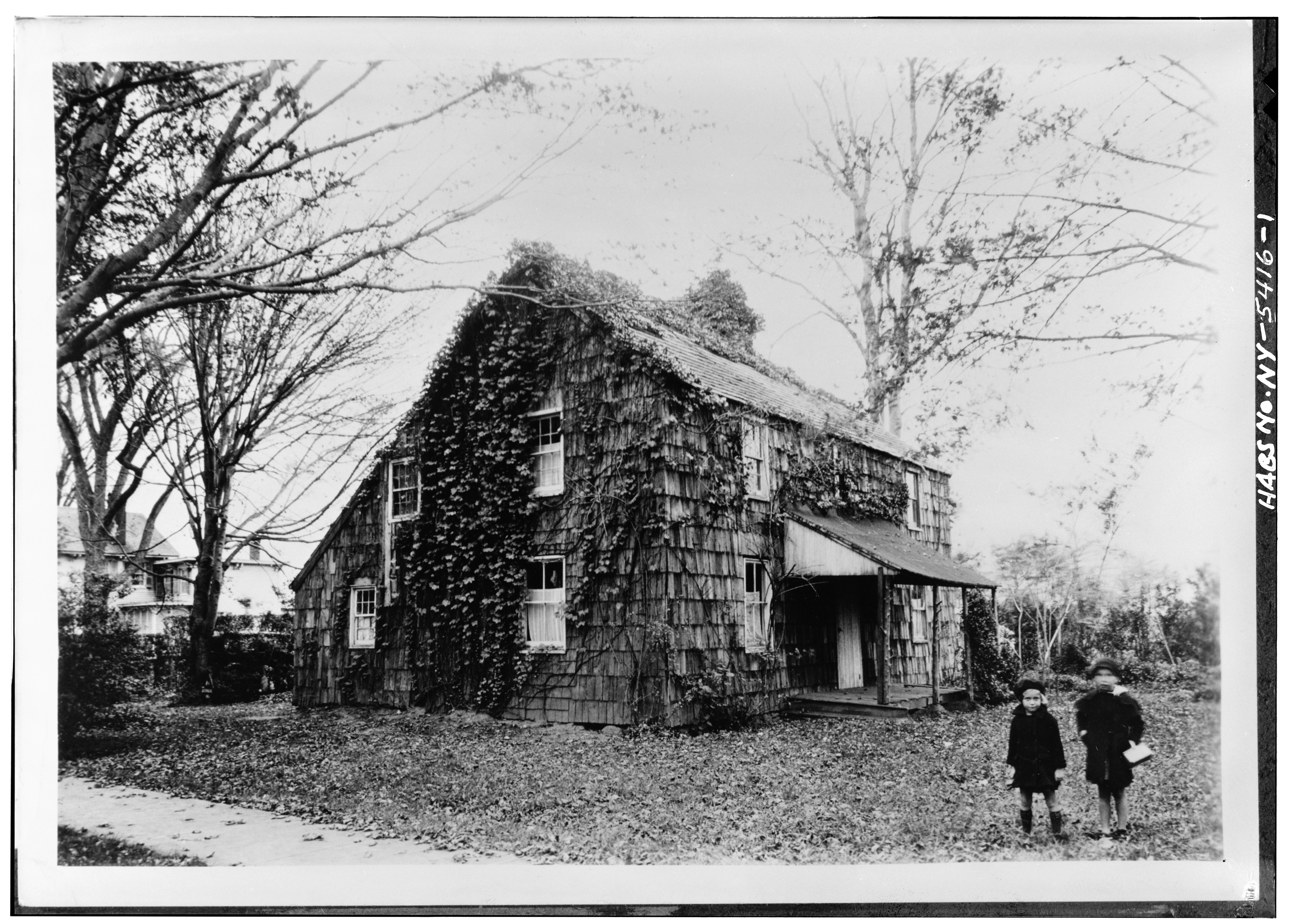
Ananias Conklin House on Main Street

In 1998 President Bill Clinton, who was vacationing in East Hampton, gave a Saturday radio address from the Amagansett Fire House.

Amagansett includes a section of Further Lane, which is a block from the ocean, and has one of East Hampton's biggest collections of mansions. In 2007, one of the estates sold for $107 million, the highest price for a private residential property.

As part of the settlement, several 18th- and 19th-century buildings that had been moved to the estate to prevent demolition were moved elsewhere in town—including five that were moved to form a campus for the East Hampton town government.

Amagansett, a pictorial history of the hamlet, was published in 1997 by Carleton Kelsey, longtime director of the Amagansett Free Library and former town clerk, and Lucinda Mayo, descendant of one of Amagansett's 17th-century founders.

Many houses and other buildings from the 19th and even 18th century still stand in Amagansett, Montauk, the Hamptons, and other Long Island communities.

== Geography ==
According to the United States Census Bureau, the CDP has an area of 6.6 square miles (17.0 km^{2}), of which 6.5 square miles (16.9 km^{2}) is land and 0.039 square miles (0.1 km^{2}), or 0.37%, is water.

At the end of the last Ice Age, Amagansett stood at Long Island's eastern tip. At that time, Montauk was an island in the Atlantic. In the intervening several thousand years, ocean currents, or littoral drift, filled in space with sand. This area is now known as Napeague.

Distinct places within Amagansett include Amagansett village, Beach Hampton, and the Devon Colony on Gardiner's Bay. Other places of geographic significance include the "Walking Dunes" in Napeague and the Atlantic Double Dunes, which are protected by The Nature Conservancy and local and federal governments.

== Demographics ==
Historical population
Census	Pop.	Note	%±
2000	1,067		—
2010	1,165		9.2%
2020	1,824		56.6%
U.S. Decennial Census

Amagansett CDP, New York – Racial and ethnic composition Note: the US Census treats Hispanic/Latino as an ethnic category. This table excludes Latinos from the racial categories and assigns them to a separate category. Hispanics/Latinos may be of any race.
Race / Ethnicity (NH = Non-Hispanic)	Pop 2000	Pop 2010	Pop 2020	% 2000	% 2010	% 2020
White alone (NH)	988	1,004	1,522	92.60%	86.18%	83.44%
Black or African American alone (NH)	18	13	35	1.69%	1.12%	1.92%
Native American or Alaska Native alone (NH)	3	2	0	0.28%	0.17%	0.00%
Asian alone (NH)	4	22	18	0.37%	1.89%	0.99%
Native Hawaiian or Pacific Islander alone (NH)	0	0	2	0.00%	0.00%	0.11%
Other race alone (NH)	3	0	22	0.28%	0.00%	1.21%
Mixed race or Multiracial (NH)	8	5	39	0.75%	0.43%	2.14%
Hispanic or Latino (any race)	43	119	186	4.03%	10.21%	10.20%
Total	1,067	1,165	1,824	100.00%	100.00%	100.00%

=== 2000 census ===
As of the census of 2000, there were 1,067 people, 493 households, and 281 families residing in the CDP. The population density was 169.6 inhabitants per square mile (65.5/km^{2}). There were 1,664 housing units at an average density of 264.5 per square mile (102.1/km^{2}). The racial makeup of the CDP was 96.44% White, 1.69% African American, 0.28% Native American, 0.37% Asian, 0.28% from other races, and 0.94% from two or more races. Hispanic or Latino of any race were 4.03% of the population.

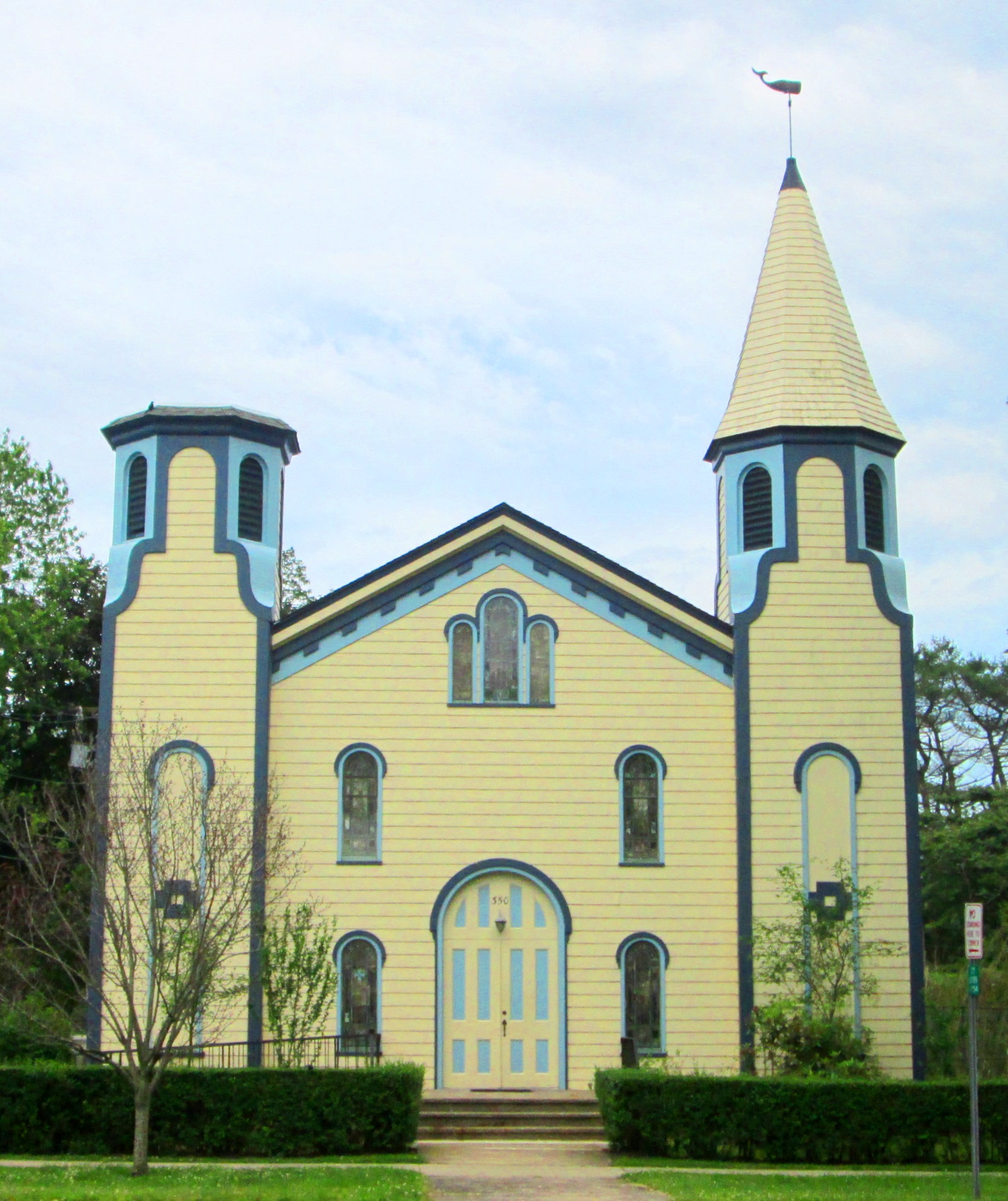
The First Presbyterian Church was founded in 1860

There were 493 households, out of which 21.1% had children under the age of 18 living with them, 48.1% were married couples living together, 6.5% had a female householder with no husband present, and 43.0% were non-families. 34.9% of all households were made up of individuals, and 15.6% had someone living alone who was 65 years of age or older. The average household size was 2.16 and the average family size was 2.78.

In the CDP, the population was spread out, with 19.1% under the age of 18, 3.2% from 18 to 24, 22.3% from 25 to 44, 33.0% from 45 to 64, and 22.4% who were 65 years of age or older. The median age was 48 years. For every 100 females, there were 102.9 males. For every 100 females age 18 and over, there were 94.8 males.

The median income for a household in the CDP was $56,406, and the median income for a family was $69,306. Males had a median income of $48,750 versus $36,500 for females. The per capita income for the CDP was $45,545. About 2.4% of families and 5.3% of the population were below the poverty line, including 4.7% of those under age 18 and 4.9% of those age 65 or over.

== Transportation ==
Amagansett is served by Amagansett station on the Montauk Branch of the Long Island Rail Road.

The Hampton Jitney stops in Amagansett.

== Education ==
The Amagansett Union Free School District, which covers almost all of the CDP,. operates the Amagansett School, serving grades PK through 6. Students then attend East Hampton schools for grades 7 to 12.

A small piece of the CDP is in the East Hampton Union Free School District.

== Notable people ==
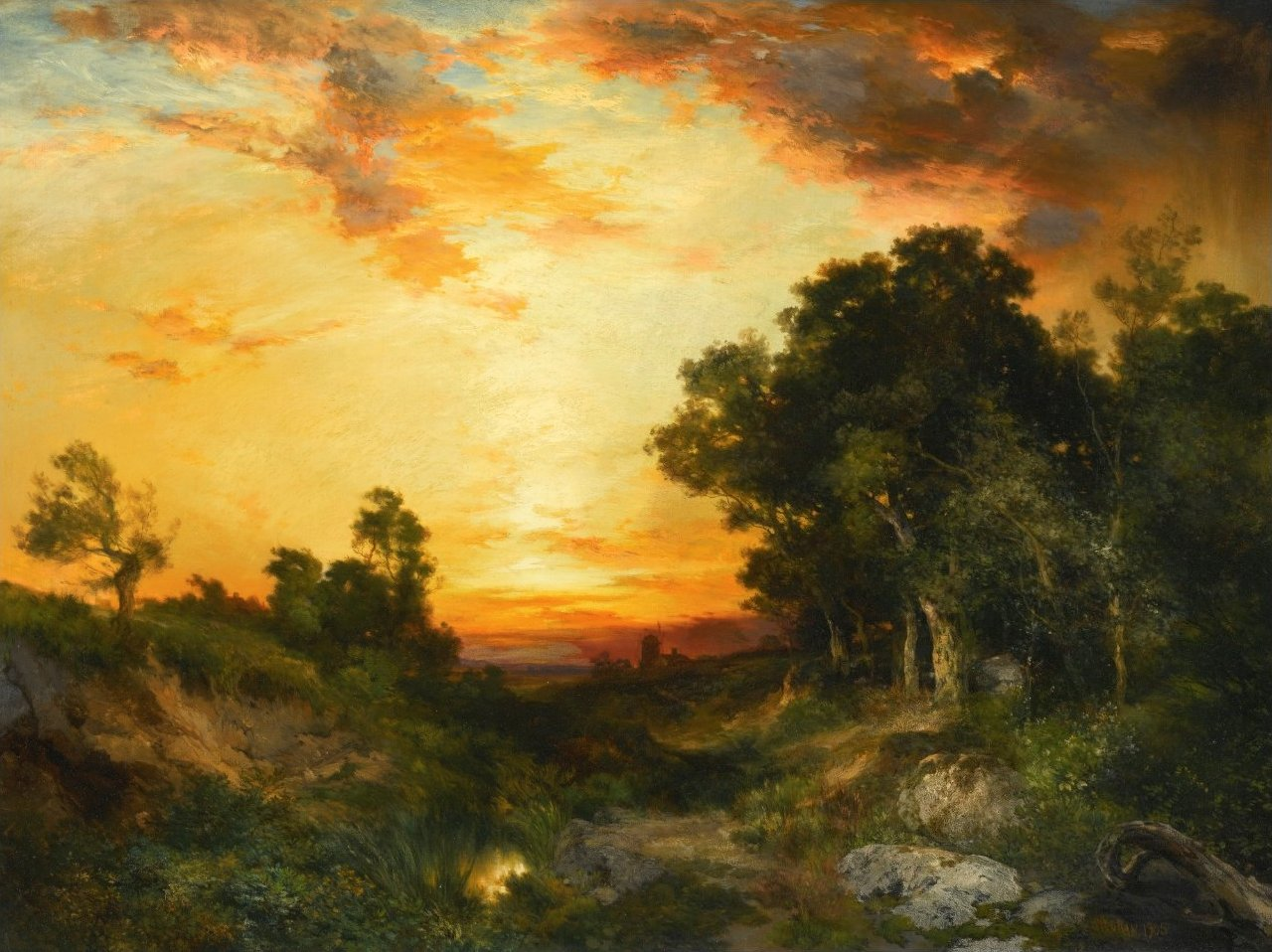
Sunset, by Thomas Moran, 1905. Amagansett, Long Island was a frequent subject for Moran.

Amagansett is a popular resort location where many famous people have resided in or owned second homes, including Paul McCartney, Scarlett Johansson, Kathleen Turner, James Frey, Billy Joel, Jerry Seinfeld, Sharyn Alfonsi , Harvey Weinstein, Christie Brinkley, Diane Sawyer, Gwyneth Paltrow and Chris Martin, Liev Schreiber and Naomi Watts, Alec Baldwin, Sarah Jessica Parker and Matthew Broderick, Peter Mayle, Jann Wenner, Suzanne Vega, Howard Stern, Lorne Michaels, President Bill Clinton and Secretary Hillary Clinton, Shane McMahon, Randy Lerner, Andy Cohen, Babs Simpson, Mitch Kupchak, and Larry Gagosian.

Marilyn Monroe and Arthur Miller spent a summer there in the late 1950s. Perhaps the first wave of "summer people" was the "Devon Colony", founded in the late 19th century by executives of the Procter & Gamble company. Performance artist Laurie Anderson and her husband Lou Reed divided their time between their Greenwich Village apartment and a house in Amagansett, which Anderson called "our spiritual home." Reed died there in 2013. Alfred Conkling was born in Amagansett.

Preceded by Napeague	The Hamptons	Succeeded by East Hampton
