= Montauk station =

Long Island Rail Road station in Suffolk County, New York

Montauk
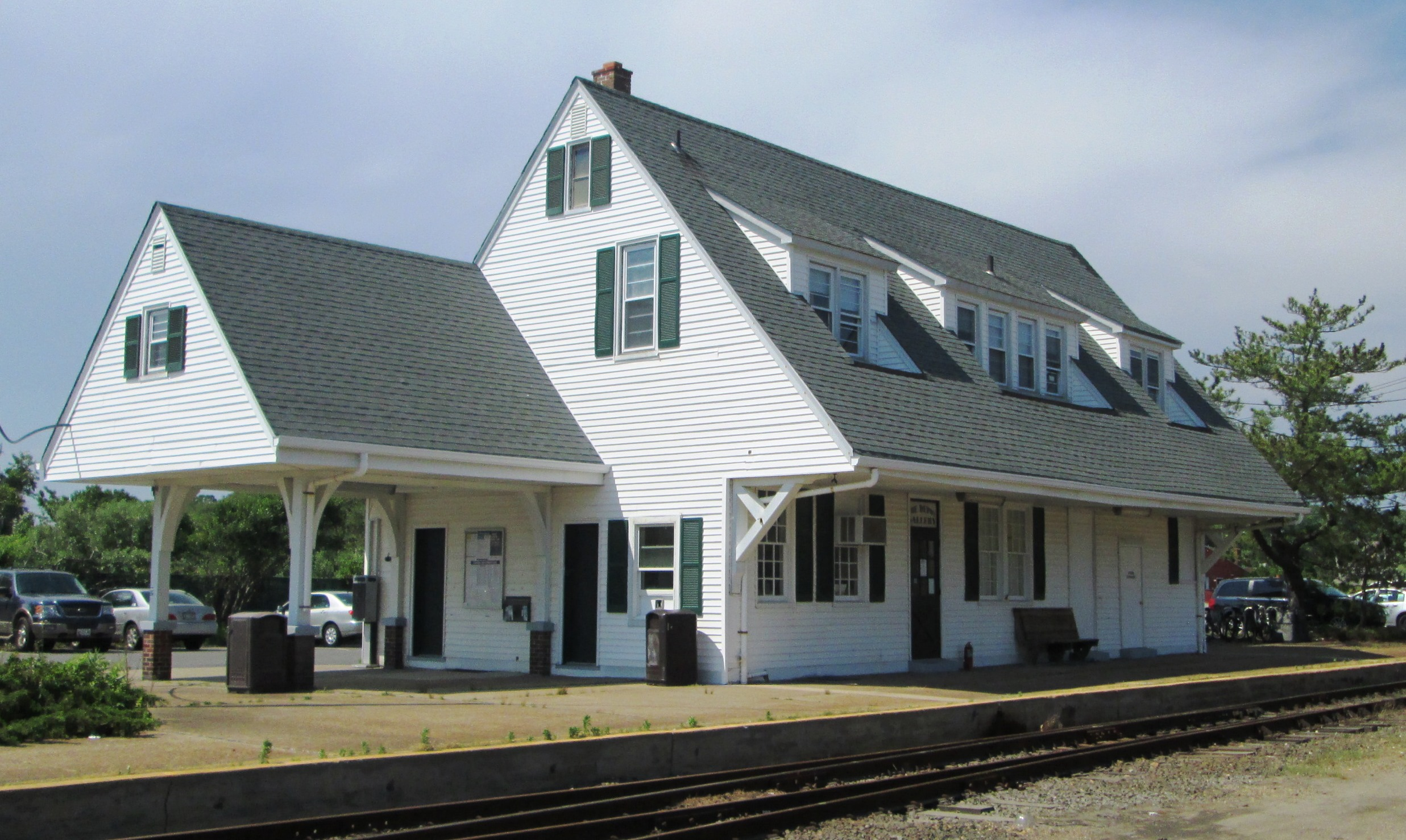
- The former Montauk station house, now the Depot Art Gallery, in 2013

General information
- Location: Edgemere Street & Fort Pond Road; Montauk, New York
- Coordinates: 41.046793°N 71.954452°W
- Owner: Long Island Rail Road
- Platforms: 1 island platform
- Tracks: 7

Construction
- Parking: Yes (free)
- Cycle facilities: Yes
- Accessible: Yes

Other information
- Station code: MTK
- Fare zone: 14

History
- Opened: 1895
- Rebuilt: 1907, 1927, 1942, 2001

Passengers
- 2012—2014: 55 (weekday), 476 (weekend)
- Rank: 116 of 125

Services
| Preceding station | Long Island Rail Road | Following station |
|---|---|---|
| Amagansett toward Penn Station or Long Island City | Montauk Branch limited service | Terminus |
| Amagansett toward Penn Station | Cannonball summers only | Terminus |
| East Hampton One-way operation | Cannonball summers only | Terminus |
Former services
| Preceding station | Long Island Rail Road | Following station |
|---|---|---|
| Promised Land toward Long Island City | Montauk Division | Terminus |
Location

Montauk is the terminus of the Montauk Branch of the Long Island Rail Road – as well as the easternmost railroad station on Long Island and in New York state. The station is located on Edgemere Street (CR 49) and Fort Pond Road, in Montauk, New York.

== History ==
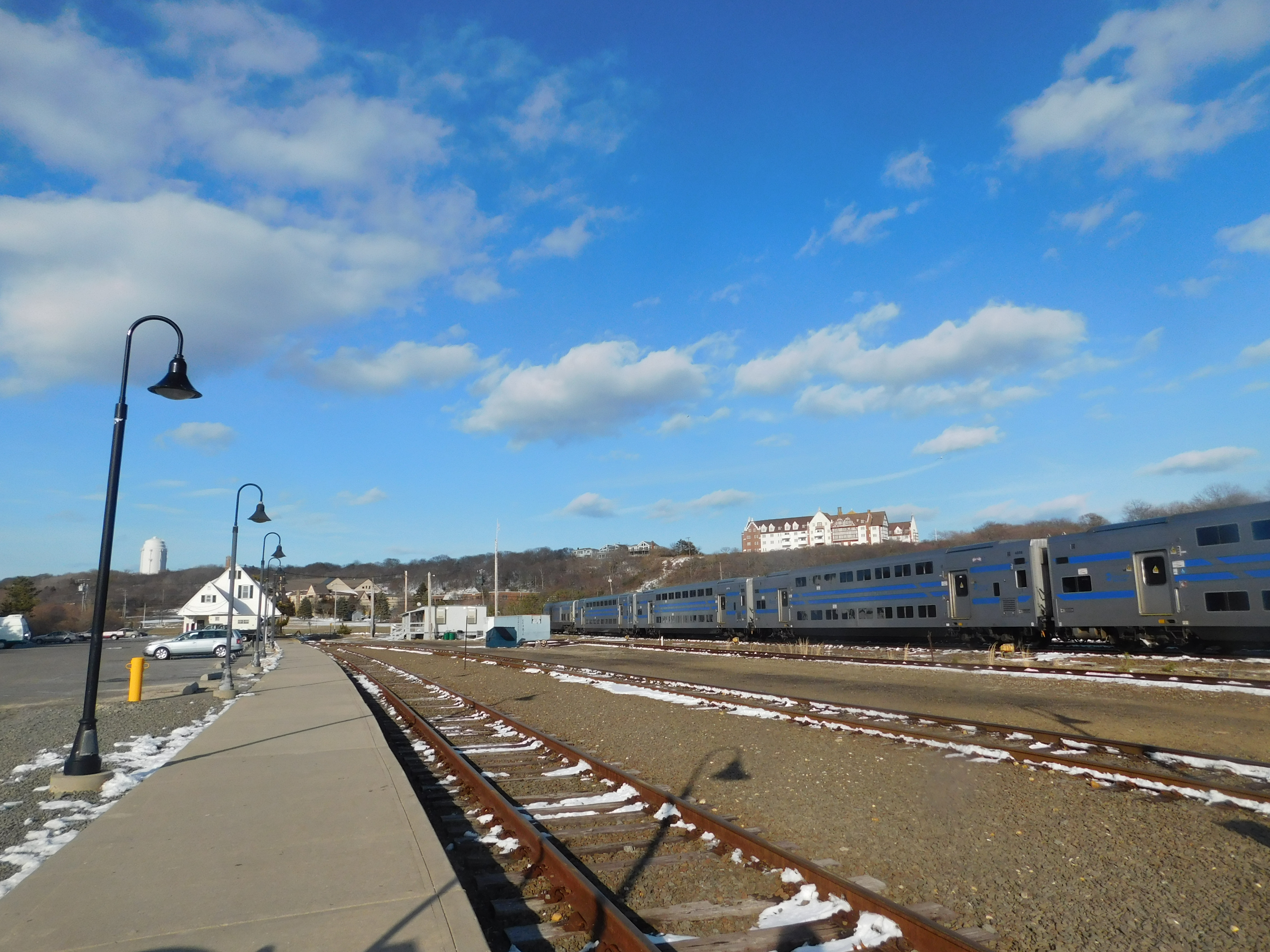
The station depot and yard at Montauk in March 2017

Originally built in 1895 by the Brooklyn and Montauk Railroad, it was demolished in 1907, then rebuilt twenty years later, only to be relocated by the US Navy during World War II along with a great deal of Montauk itself. The Navy confiscated the property along Fort Pond Bay in order to transform it into a sea plane base, and moved the LIRR property to the south with a third station built in 1942. The station was built in a similar style to the second station, but not the same design. Both the second and third stations still survive to this day, and for a while the second one was owned by the New York Ocean Science Laboratory. Today the second station is on the property of the Roughrider Landing Condominiums. The third station house also contained a freight house that was moved to Industrial Road in the late 1960s, and is now a private residence.

The current and fourth Montauk station is an unoccupied high-level center platform for two of the seven tracks. The platform from the old station leads to the current station. A wye exists west of the station that leads to a short spur across Industrial Road to Fort Pond, and was used to turn around engines. It also once had another spur on the opposite side of the tracks leading to a fishing dock on Fort Pond Bay. The previous station house is now known as the Depot Art Gallery. Montauk station was one of the settings for the 2004 movie Eternal Sunshine of the Spotless Mind starring Jim Carrey and Kate Winslet.

The noise of train engines left idling for long periods in the Montauk Yard was a cause of concern for local residents, who formed a group called the Montauk Anti-Pollution Coalition in 2003. The LIRR began shutting engines off in 2009.

== Station layout ==
This station has one six-car-long high-level island platform between the two northernmost tracks. Five additional tracks to the south, not adjacent to the platform, comprise a train storage yard. When the LIRR provides extra service to the Hamptons during the summer, on weekends the yard is typically filled with passenger trains that terminate at Montauk, including the Friday afternoon Cannonball express train from Penn Station.

== See also ==
- Montauk Point land claim
