= South Fork =

South Fork most commonly refers to the peninsula at the east end of the South Shore of Long Island.

South Fork may also refer to:

== In municipalities ==
=== In Canada ===
- South Fork, Saskatchewan

=== In the United States ===
- Big South Fork National River and Recreation Area, in northeastern Tennessee and southeastern Kentucky
- South Fork, Madera County, California
- South Fork, Colorado
- South Fork, Missouri
- South Fork, Nevada
- South Fork, Pennsylvania
- South Fork, Wisconsin, a town
- South Fork (community), Wisconsin, an unincorporated community
- South Fork Township (disambiguation)

== In rivers ==
- Big South Fork of the Cumberland River
- South Fork American River
- South Fork Eel River
- South Fork Grand River (South Dakota)
- South Fork Holston River
- South Fork John Day River
- South Fork Musselshell River
- South Fork Rio Grande
- South Fork Shenandoah River
- South Fork Spring River
- South Fork Trinity River

== In other uses ==
- South Fork Dam, a dam in Pennsylvania
- South Fork Fishing and Hunting Club
- South Fork High School, a public high school in Stuart, Florida

== See also ==
- Southfork (disambiguation)
