= Hampton Luxury Liner =

Bus company in New York, United States

- Parent: M&V Limousines Limited
- Founded: 2000
- Defunct: 2016-2017
- Headquarters: Commack, New York
- Locale: Long Island, New York
- Service area: South Fork
- Operator: Hampton Luxury Liner Inc.
- Chief executive: Mark Vigliante
- Website: www.hamptonluxuryliner.com

The Hampton Luxury Liner is a private bus company based in Commack, New York. Founded in 2000, the company provides seasonal bus service between the East Side of Manhattan, New York City and The Hamptons, Long Island.

The company mainly competes with the Hampton Jitney, another private bus company, as well as the Montauk Branch of the Long Island Rail Road. The Hampton Luxury Liner shut down in September 2016, but its naming rights were purchased in 2017 and service resumed that year.

== Services ==
Hampton Luxury Liner passengers are required to make advance reservations and payment, either via phone, online, or in a mobile app. The company also offers charters and wine tours.

Manhattan stops are limited to Midtown East, Hudson Yards, and the Upper East Side, while Hamptons stops are in various hamlets from Southampton to Montauk. Buses also make an Airport Connection stop on the Long Island Expressway service roads in Fresh Meadows, Queens.

== History ==
Hampton Luxury Liner was founded in 2000.

=== Acquisition and bankruptcy ===
On February 21, 2009, Classic Coach announced its purchase of the Hampton Luxury Liner. This moved the company's headquarters from Bridgehampton to Bohemia. Classic Coach continued to operate service under the Luxury Liner brand. Classic Coach also operated 7Bus, a in-island commuter service between Riverhead, Ronkonkoma, and Melville. The service was known BoltBus Long Island until a licensing agreement ended in June 2013.

Hampton Luxury Liner filed for chapter 11 bankruptcy in September 2015, and Classic Coach followed March 2016. Luxury Liner service ceased on September 5, 2016. The company had owed its largest creditor over $2.5 million.

=== Relaunch ===
In November 2016, M&V Limousines Limited purchased the naming rights to the Luxury Liner brand in an auction. Service resumed on May 25, 2017.

In October 2017, the company announced the start of commuter service, connecting Midtown and Downtown Manhattan with Southampton, Farmingville, Ronkonkoma, and Melville.

The company announced in December 2018 that it would reduce off-season ticket prices. Service for the 2019–2020 off-season was suspended due to low demand, with buses scheduled to resume service on April 1, 2020.
