= Southfork =

Southfork may refer to:

- Southfork, Gauteng, a suburb of Johannesburg, South Africa
- Southfork Ranch, Texas where the Dallas television series was filmed

== See also ==
- South Fork (disambiguation)
