= South Fork (Long Island) =

Peninsula on Long Island, New York, United States

Coordinates: 41°2′N 71°58′W

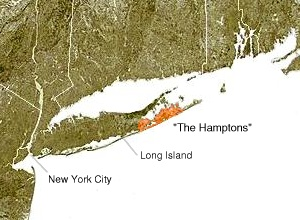
The Hamptons, roughly coterminous with the South Fork, are highlighted.

The South Fork of Suffolk County, New York is a peninsula in the southeastern section of the county on the South Shore of Long Island. The South Fork includes most of the Hamptons. The shorter, more northerly peninsula is known as the North Fork.

== Geography ==
The South Fork is composed of all of the Town of East Hampton and a substantial part of the Town of Southampton. The body of water to the south is the Atlantic Ocean.

The South Fork and North Fork split at Riverhead, New York where the Peconic River empties into Peconic Bay. It has long been noted that Long Island resembles a fish with the forks forming a tail. The native name for this is "Paumanok". This name is also used to name a trail that navigates the entirety of the South Fork (as well as parts of Long Island), the Paumanok Path.

The South Fork and North Fork are separated by Great Peconic Bay, Little Peconic Bay, and Gardiners Bay. Between the two forks lie several islands, including Gardiners Island and Shelter Island.

The eastern end of the South Fork, Montauk Point State Park, in the census-designated place of Montauk, New York, is the easternmost point in the State of New York, and of Suffolk County. The eastern end of the North Fork is Orient Point, New York, but is further west in relation to Montauk Point.

== Transportation ==
The South Fork is most commonly reached by roadways from the west, but the area also offers commuter rail service, bus service, and ferry service.

=== Roads ===
The most prominent road on the south fork is Montauk Highway (part of New York State Route 27) which traverses the entire region. However, there are numerous other roads that are heavily traveled but unknown to most. For example, Noyac Road provides a parallel route to Montauk Highway in the northern area of the region between North Sea and Sag Harbor. Sag Harbor is also served by the Bridgehampton-Sag Harbor Turnpike (CR 79) from Bridgehampton, Sagg Road from Sagaponack, Wainscott Northwest Road from Wainscott, and the East Hampton-Sag Harbor Turnpike (NY-114) from East Hampton and points east. The area also boasts many back roads around East Hampton, the Springs, and Amagansett, such as Three Mile Harbor Road, Springs Fireplace Road, and Old Stone Highway.

=== Trains ===
The Long Island Rail Road Montauk Branch has stops in Westhampton, Hampton Bays, Southampton, Bridgehampton, East Hampton, Amagansett, and Montauk. Service is infrequent most of the time due to the fact that there is only one track. The easiest time to take the train to the South Fork is on Fridays, when most trains run out of the city, and Sundays, when most trains run into the city, although this sequence also can be applied during morning and evening rush hours.

=== Buses ===
The Hampton Jitney and the Hampton Luxury Liner provide bus service primarily between the South Fork and New York City. Local bus service is provided by Suffolk County Transit.

=== Ferries ===
Direct access between the South Fork and Shelter Island is via the South Ferry (the North Ferry provides access to Shelter Island from the North Fork). Additionally, passenger ferry service runs occasionally between Montauk and Block Island, RI, New London, CT, and Martha's Vineyard, MA.
