= South Fork Township =

South Fork Township may refer to:

- South Fork Township, Fulton County, Arkansas
- South Fork Township, Montgomery County, Arkansas
- South Fork Township, Christian County, Illinois
- South Fork Township, Delaware County, Iowa
- South Fork Township, Jackson County, Iowa
- South Fork Township, Wayne County, Iowa
- South Fork Township, Kanabec County, Minnesota
- South Fork Township, Audrain County, Missouri
- South Fork Township, Howell County, Missouri
- South Fork Township, Monroe County, Missouri
- South Fork Township, Forsyth County, North Carolina
- South Fork Township, Tyrrell County, North Carolina, in Tyrrell County, North Carolina
- South Fork Township, Adams County, North Dakota

== See also ==
- South Fork (disambiguation)
