= South Fork (community), Wisconsin =

South Fork, Wisconsin
- Unincorporated community
- Location within Wisconsin Location within the United States
- Coordinates: 45°34′51″N 90°43′14″W
- Country: United States
- State: Wisconsin
- County: Rusk
- Elevation: 1,345 ft (410 m)
- Time zone: UTC-6 (Central (CST))
  - Summer (DST): UTC-5 (CDT)
- Area codes: 715 & 534
- GNIS feature ID: 1584177

South Fork is an unincorporated community is located in the Town of South Fork, in Rusk County, Wisconsin, United States. Originally known as Czestochowa, after Częstochowa, Poland and having its name changed to the current name in 1917, South Fork is located along County Highway M, north of Village of Hawkins. The South Fork Townhall and the former South Fork School are located within this community.
