= Hampton Jitney =

Motorcoach company in Southampton, NY, USA

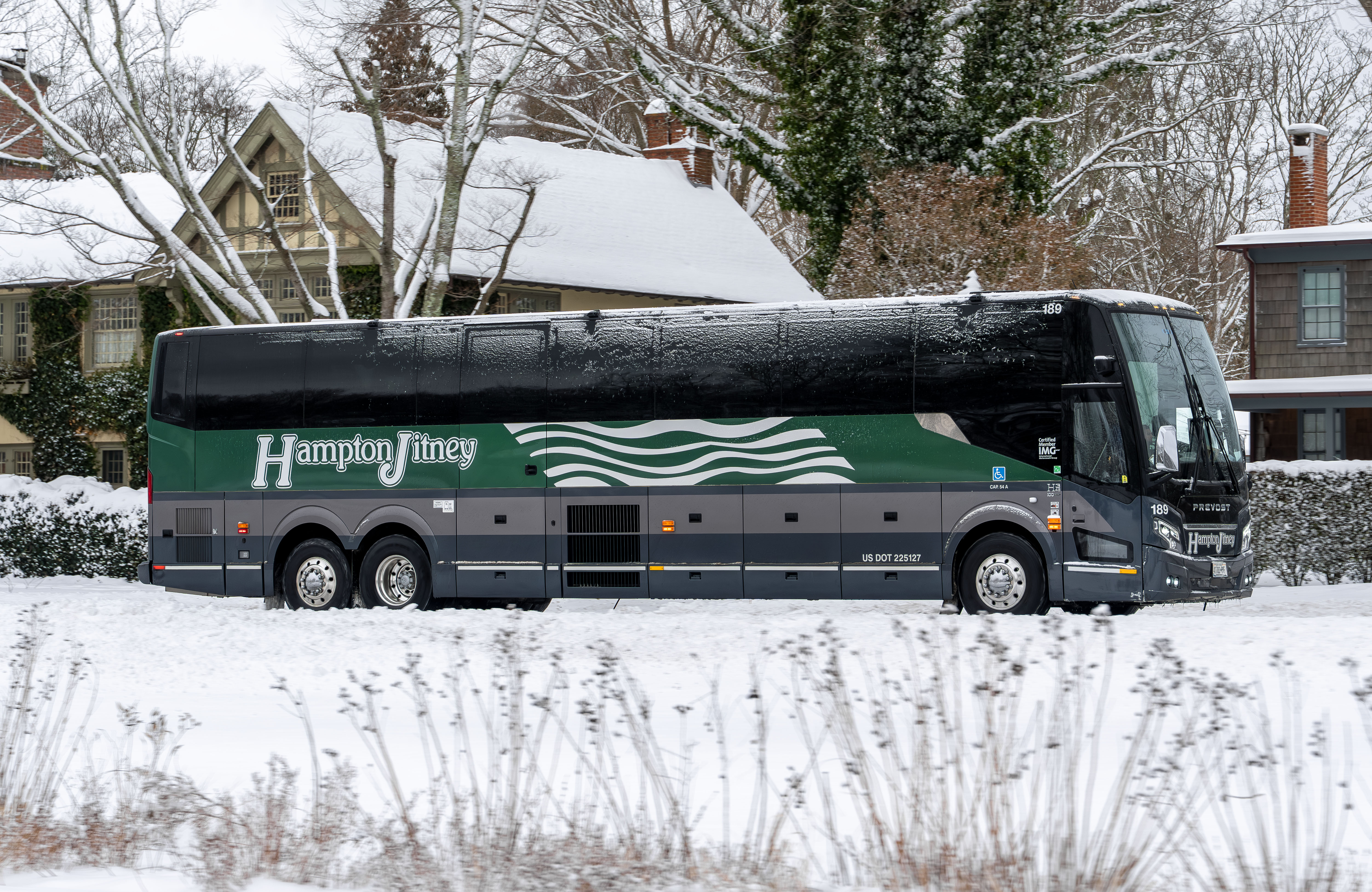
- Hampton Jitney Prevost #189 in transit on Montauk Highway in East Hampton, New York.
- Founded: 1974
- Headquarters: 253 Edwards Avenue, Calverton, New York
- Locale: Eastern Long Island
- Service area: North and South Forks
- Service type: Line run, contract service
- Alliance: International Motor Coach Group
- Routes: 6 operated by Hampton Jitney; 2 On Demand Zones as Suffolk County Transit
- Stops: 18 in Manhattan; 2 airport connections 10 for Montauk service 5 for Westhampton service 15 for North Fork service
- Hubs: The Omni (Southampton); Calverton Terminal (Calverton)
- Fleet: 49 for line runs 36 for contract operations
- Chief executive: Geoffrey Lynch
- Website: Hampton Jitney

Hampton Jitney is a commuter bus company based in Southampton, New York. It operates three primary routes from the east end of Long Island (The Hamptons and the North Fork) to New York City. Hampton Jitney also operates charter and tour services, along with local transit bus service in eastern Suffolk County under contract with Suffolk County Transit.

== History ==
=== Van service ===
Hampton Jitney was founded in 1974 with a single van by James Davidson, a former advertising art director, who lived in the Hamptons and wanted to establish a convenient means for traveling in the Hamptons, especially for those without a driver's license.

Initially, the company used vans instead of buses, operating on the theory of a share taxi (jitney) service among the little communities of The Hamptons. The company has retained a name which no longer describes its main service and fleet.

=== Expansion to New York City ===
The founder saw a need for a new transit option for people travelling between New York City and the Hamptons region of Long Island. The area has long been served by the Long Island Rail Road (LIRR), but by the 1970s poor track conditions on its Montauk Branch resulted in lengthy trip times and delayed trains. Rebuilding the Montauk Branch in 1978 and 1979 resulted in quicker and more reliable trips, but the non-electrified single track line limited train frequency. The LIRR does maintain a number of passing sidings along the Montauk Branch that would allow more frequent service. By the late 1970s Hampton Jitney acquired a fleet of coaches. In the 1980s Hampton Jitney services had expanded to the point where the company runs roughly hourly service year-round on its Montauk Line and service between 2 and 3 hours on its Westhampton, and North Fork line. The company also started a charter service during this time.

=== Later developments ===
In 2006, Hampton Jitney acquired the line run and charter business from Sunrise Coach Lines, based in Greenport, Long Island. This gave Hampton Jitney its third line, The North Fork Line. In 2007 the Jitney (as it is often called) started a direct service to and from Brooklyn on its Montauk and North Fork lines. In 2008 a direct service to and from lower Manhattan was started on its Montauk line. Sunrise Coach lines continues to operate as a provider of School Bus routes and operator for the 8A, 10D, 10E, and S92 routes for Suffolk County Transit, as well as operations of the 10A, 10B, 10C, and S94 lines under its own banner. Hampton Jitney's operations are headquartered at The Omni in Southampton. It opened a second base in Calverton in 2015. In 2021, following the elimination of SCT Route 10A, Suffolk County Transit Launched a Pilot Program known as the Southampton/Sag Harbor On Demand Zone, as a replacement to the 10A. The county contracted Hampton Jitney to operate the vehicles while Via Transportation was contracted to run the technical side of the new on-demand Area. With the Suffolk County Transit Redesign, the pilot program expanded with the East Hampton and Montauk and replaced bus routes 10B and 10C.

In April 2024, Suffolk County bus routes 10B and 10C were replaced by the East Hampton and Montauk On-Demand Zone, which continues to be operated by Hampton Jitney. The New East Hampton On-Demand zone was initially supposed to launch on the date of the Suffolk Transit Redesign, but due to a manufacturer vehicle recall, it was delayed until April 2024. All fixed route buses that Hampton Jitney had for SCT Fixed Route Service, including buses 1011 and 1065, have been transferred to EBT Inc and Suffolk Bus Corp. With Orion VII NG's 1011 and 1065 going to EBT Inc, and the ARBOC Spirit of Mobility buses going to Suffolk Bus Corporation. 1011 and 1065, and most of the ARBOC buses continue to be in service today.

Since October 11, 2010, the Hampton Jitney is the only year-round transportation provider between New York City and the North Fork on weekends and major holidays. The LIRR service along the Greenport Branch was cut back in the second round of major MTA budget cuts. Since then, year-round weekend and holiday service to and from Greenport on the LIRR has been restored.

== Routes ==
Hampton Jitney operates three primary routes. All eastbound trips begin at 96th Street and make various pickup stops along Lexington Avenue and westbound trips drop off along Third Avenue, unless otherwise noted.

=== Long Island ===
Primary routes

- The Montauk Line serves Manorville, and then the South Fork villages from Southampton to Montauk. A branch of this route serves the village of Sag Harbor either by direct bus service or via a shuttle from its Southampton base.
- The Westhampton Line serves Manorville, the villages of Westhampton, The Quogues, and Hampton Bays.
- The North Fork Line, which was inherited from the purchase of Sunrise Coach Lines in 2006, serves the towns and villages from Riverhead to Greenport with some buses continuing onto East Marion, Orient, and Orient Point.

Special services

- Airport Connection: All routes stop in Fresh Meadows for connections to either of the NYC airports. In addition, the Montauk and Westhampton lines include a stop near exit 60 of the Long Island Expressway (LIE) for a taxi connection to MacArthur Airport on Long Island.
- West Side Service: One eastbound Montauk bus originates on 69th Street and Broadway, traveling south along Broadway and Seventh Avenue to the Midtown Tunnel, following the normal route hereon. In addition, two westbound Montauk buses and one westbound Westhampton bus continue west beyond the 86th Street terminus and stop along Broadway between 86th and 64th Streets.
- The Bonacker: One eastbound Montauk bus, runs express between 40th Street and East Hampton, making all stops following. This service operates Friday evenings only.
- The Matinéer: One westbound Montauk bus and one westbound Westhampton bus alights passengers along Third Avenue in Midtown, but travel west along 57th Street or Central Park South, and downtown along Seventh Avenue to Bleecker Street.
- The Greenporter: One North Fork bus runs express between 40th Street and Southold, with an additional stop in Greenport. This service operates eastbound Friday afternoons and westbound Sunday afternoons.
- The Lower Manhattan Line: One eastbound Ambassador that leaves Amagansett early Monday morning and runs express between Manorville and 34th Street. It travels downtown along Second Avenue and Allen, Madison, Water, and State Streets, before terminating near the World Financial Center.
- The Brooklyn Line: One Westhampton bus and one North Fork bus in each direction, making stops in Brooklyn Heights, Park Slope, and Boreum Hill.

=== Boston Jitney ===
The Boston Jitney is a service that runs between Southampton and the Prudential Center in Downtown Boston. The bus stops in Southampton, Hampton Bays, Farmingville, and Port Jefferson before taking the Bridgeport & Port Jefferson Ferry to Bridgeport, CT. From the Bridgeport ferry terminal it runs express to Boston. It then stops at an MBTA station in the nearby suburb of Newton, Massachusetts before terminating in Downtown Boston. There were 13 buses scheduled to operate along the Boston route in 2013.

=== Suffolk County Transit ===
Hampton Jitney operates Suffolk County Transit's two on-demand microtransit zones. The Southampton-Sag Harbor zone, and the East Hampton-Montauk zone. For more information, see the Suffolk County Transit page.

As of October 29, 2023, Hampton Jitney no longer operates any SCT Fixed Route services.

== Services ==
Hampton Jitney buses (not counting the Suffolk Transit-branded buses) require reservations, and limit the use of cell phones. The company provides refreshment service on all buses. Seasonal services are also offered to Boston and Florida. The trip via the Jitney is often quicker by an hour or more, when road congestion is not severe. A prepaid, discounted 12-trip coupon book, called a "Valuepack" is offered, usually around November and December. Most buses finish on the Upper East Side of Manhattan, but some also go to the Upper West Side and some only go to Lower Manhattan or Downtown Brooklyn.

Hampton Jitney's charter service include one day trips to Broadway Shows, Giant and Jets games at Giants Stadium, and regional events such as the annual Philadelphia Flower Show. Multiple day trips are also scheduled to points such as Atlantic City, and New England. Civic and Charitable Organizations within the 5 towns of Long Island's east end charter Hampton Jitney busses for special trips to New York City as fundraisers for these groups. Due to the very limited profile maintained by the Long Island Railroad (LIRR) on the east end, it is rare, if ever, that the LIRR is called upon for extra services such as these.

== In popular culture ==
- In the Episode "Spilling Secrets" of Blue Bloods two Hampton Jitney coaches are prominently featured as a father looks for his daughter.
- In the episode "A Girl Named Maria" of Ray Donovan a Hampton Jitney coach is prominently featured in the plot line.
- In the episode "Twenty-Something Girls vs. Thirty-Something Women" of Sex and The City, the four main characters travel to the Hamptons on the Hampton Jitney, where Carrie Bradshaw described it as "like the bus to summer camp, only instead of singing songs, everyone speaks on their cell phones and ignores each other." In the episode "Running with Scissors," Natasha came home unexpectedly from the Hamptons and said, "I took the Jitney home," only to find that Carrie was in the apartment, not her husband.
- The novel and movie Something Borrowed by Emily Giffin make a reference to the Jitney when main character Rachael takes it back to Manhattan from the Hamptons because she has to work unexpectedly. Dex, her love interest, offers to drive her, and when he drops her off they make plans to meet during the week.
- In "Summer Kind of Wonderful" from the second season of Gossip Girl, numerous references to Hampton Jitney are made. In one scene, Blair returns to The Hamptons on the Hampton Jitney and a scene depicts her disembarking the Jitney. In another scene, Serena and Dan have sex in the bathroom on another Hampton Jitney motorcoach.
- In "Never been Marcused," also in Gossip Girl's second season, Dan and Serena have a similar encounter on a Brooklyn-bound Hampton Jitney motorcoach, similar to "Summer Kind of Wonderful" encounter. Blair is also on the Jitney in this episode.
- In a How I Met Your Mother episode, Ted Mosby sent Victoria on board a bus.
- In Triple Moon, the first book in the Summer on East End duology by Melissa de la Cruz, the main character, Molly Overbrook, mentions her father her plans to make North Hampton be just like the other Hamptons, changing its small-town appearance by destroying the magical barrier around it and putting a train station and a Jitney spot to finally connect the town to the outside world.
- In “The Real Housewives of New York City” Season 10 episode 3 Sonja Morgan travels to The Hamptons on the Hampton Jitney.
- In the Episode "Deadline" of White Collar, Sara Ellis recalls tracking a Rothko painting to the Hamptons using a Jitney receipt.

== Sources ==
- "Transit advocacy for the East End of LI". Archived from the original on February 15, 2006.
- Zeil, Ron. Steel Rails to The Sunrise.
- Barron, James (2012-07-14). "To the Hamptons, and Step on It!". The New York Times.
- Gannon, Tim (2012-11-24). "Green light for Hampton Jitney terminal in Calverton". Riverhead News Review.
