= South Fork, Wisconsin =

- Town
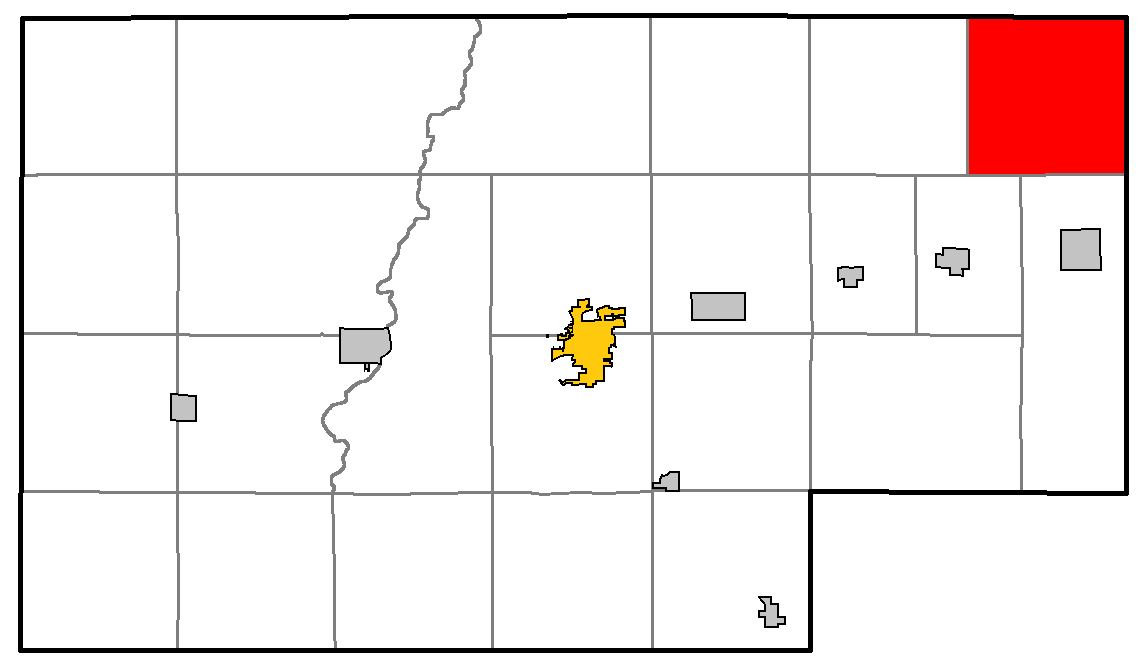
- Location of South Fork, within Rusk County

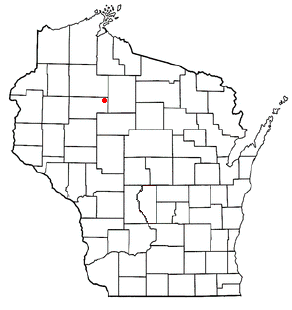
- Location of South Fork, Wisconsin
- Coordinates: 45°36′20″N 90°43′16″W
- Country: United States
- State: Wisconsin
- County: Rusk

Area
  - Total: 35.8 sq mi (92.7 km^{2})
  - Land: 35.4 sq mi (91.7 km^{2})
  - Water: 0.39 sq mi (1.0 km^{2})
- Elevation: 1,345 ft (410 m)

Population (2020)
  - Total: 115
  - Density: 3.25/sq mi (1.25/km^{2})
- Time zone: UTC-6 (Central (CST))
  - Summer (DST): UTC-5 (CDT)
- Area codes: 715 & 534
- FIPS code: 55-74975
- GNIS feature ID: 1584177

South Fork is a town in Rusk County, Wisconsin, United States. The population was 115 at the 2020 census. The unincorporated community of South Fork is located in the town.

== Geography ==
According to the United States Census Bureau, the town has a total area of 35.8 square miles (92.7 km^{2}), of which 35.4 square miles (91.7 km^{2}) is land and 0.4 square mile (1.0 km^{2}) (1.09%) is water.

== Demographics ==
As of the census of 2000, there were 120 people, 51 households, and 39 families residing in the town. The population density was 3.4 people per square mile (1.3/km^{2}). There were 91 housing units at an average density of 2.6 per square mile (1.0/km^{2}). The racial makeup of the town was 99.17% White and 0.83% Asian. Hispanic or Latino of any race were 0.83% of the population.

There were 51 households, out of which 21.6% had children under the age of 18 living with them, 68.6% were married couples living together, 3.9% had a female householder with no husband present, and 21.6% were non-families. 19.6% of all households were made up of individuals, and 11.8% had someone living alone who was 65 years of age or older. The average household size was 2.35 and the average family size was 2.60.

In the town, the population was spread out, with 17.5% under the age of 18, 6.7% from 18 to 24, 23.3% from 25 to 44, 25.8% from 45 to 64, and 26.7% who were 65 years of age or older. The median age was 46 years. For every 100 females, there were 103.4 males. For every 100 females age 18 and over, there were 106.3 males.

The median income for a household in the town was $37,500, and the median income for a family was $38,333. Males had a median income of $21,667 versus $26,042 for females. The per capita income for the town was $16,284. There were 9.5% of families and 15.7% of the population living below the poverty line, including 34.6% of under eighteens and 11.4% of those over 64.
