= Southfork, Gauteng =

Southfork
- Location within Gauteng Location within South Africa
- Coordinates: 26.298°S 27.992°E
- Country: South Africa
- Province: Gauteng
- Municipality: City of Johannesburg

Area
  - Total: 1.97 km^{2} (0.76 sq mi)

Population (2001)
  - Total: 513
  - Density: 260/km^{2} (674/sq mi)
- Time zone: UTC+2 (SAST)
- Postal code (street): 7140

Southfork is a suburb of Johannesburg, South Africa. It is located in Region F of the City of Johannesburg Metropolitan Municipality.
