= Long Island Rail Road =

Commuter rail system on Long Island, New York

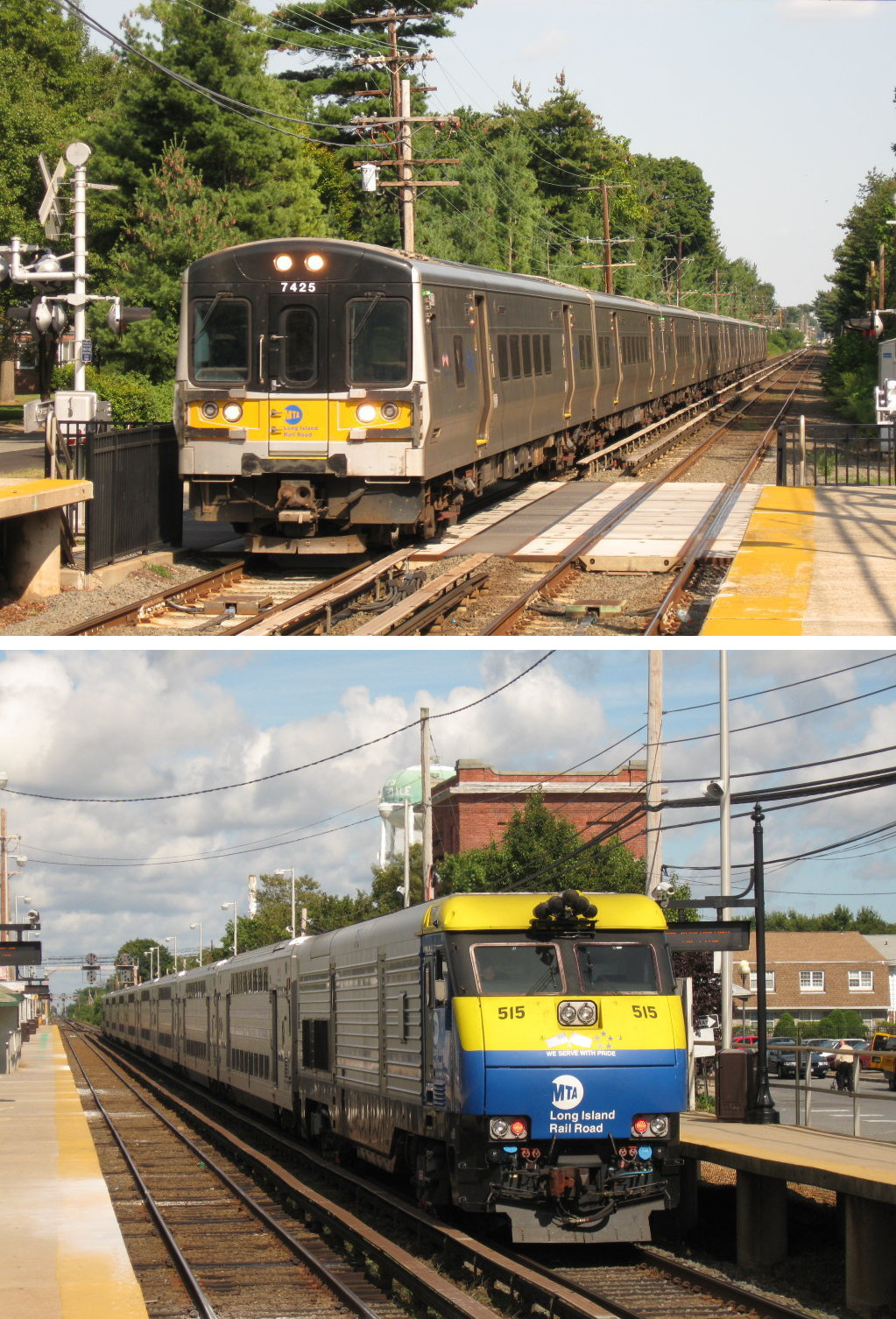
- The Long Island Rail Road provides electric and diesel rail service from east to west across Long Island

Overview
- Owner: Metropolitan Transportation Authority (MTA)
- Locale: Long Island and Manhattan, New York
- Transit type: Commuter rail
- Number of lines: 11
- Number of stations: 126
- Daily ridership: 328,300 (weekdays, Q2 2026)
- Annual ridership: 103,474,900 (2025)
- Chief executive: Robert Free
- Headquarters: Jamaica Station, 93-02 Sutphin Boulevard, Jamaica, New York, U.S.
- Website: mta.info/lirr

Operation
- Began operation: 1834 (192 years ago)
- Operator: Metropolitan Transportation Authority
- Reporting marks: LI

Technical
- System length: 319 mi (513 km) (route); 700 mi (1,100 km) (total track length)
- Track gauge: 4 ft 8 1/2 in (1,435 mm) standard gauge
- Electrification: Third rail, 750 V DC
- Top speed: 80 mph (130 km/h)
System map
Gray lines represent freight-only branches, and other colors represent the corresponding passenger branches.

The Long Island Rail Road (reporting mark LI), or LIRR, is a railroad in the southeastern part of the U.S. state of New York, stretching from Manhattan to the eastern tip of Suffolk County on Long Island. The railroad currently operates a public commuter rail service, with its freight operations contracted to the New York and Atlantic Railway. With an average daily ridership of 328,300 (weekdays, Q2 2026), and annual ridership of 103,474,900 (2025), it is the busiest commuter railroad in North America. It is also one of the world's few commuter systems that run 24/7 year-round. It is publicly owned by the Metropolitan Transportation Authority, which refers to it as MTA Long Island Rail Road.

The LIRR logo combines the circular MTA logo with the text Long Island Rail Road, and appears on the sides of trains. The LIRR is one of two commuter rail systems owned by the MTA, the other being the Metro-North Railroad in the northern suburbs of the New York metropolitan area. Established in 1834 (the first section between the Brooklyn waterfront and Jamaica opened on April 18, 1836) and having operated continuously since then, it is the oldest railroad in the United States still operating under its original name and charter. The railroad has been headquartered in the headhouse of Jamaica Station, the second busiest station in the system, since 1913.

There are 126 stations and more than 700 miles (1,100 km) of track on its two main lines running the full length of the island and eight major branches, with the passenger railroad system totaling 319 route miles (513 km). As of 2018, the LIRR's budget for expenditures was $1.6 billion plus $450 million for debt service, which it supports through the collection of fares (which cover 43% of total expenses) along with dedicated taxes and other MTA revenue.

== History ==
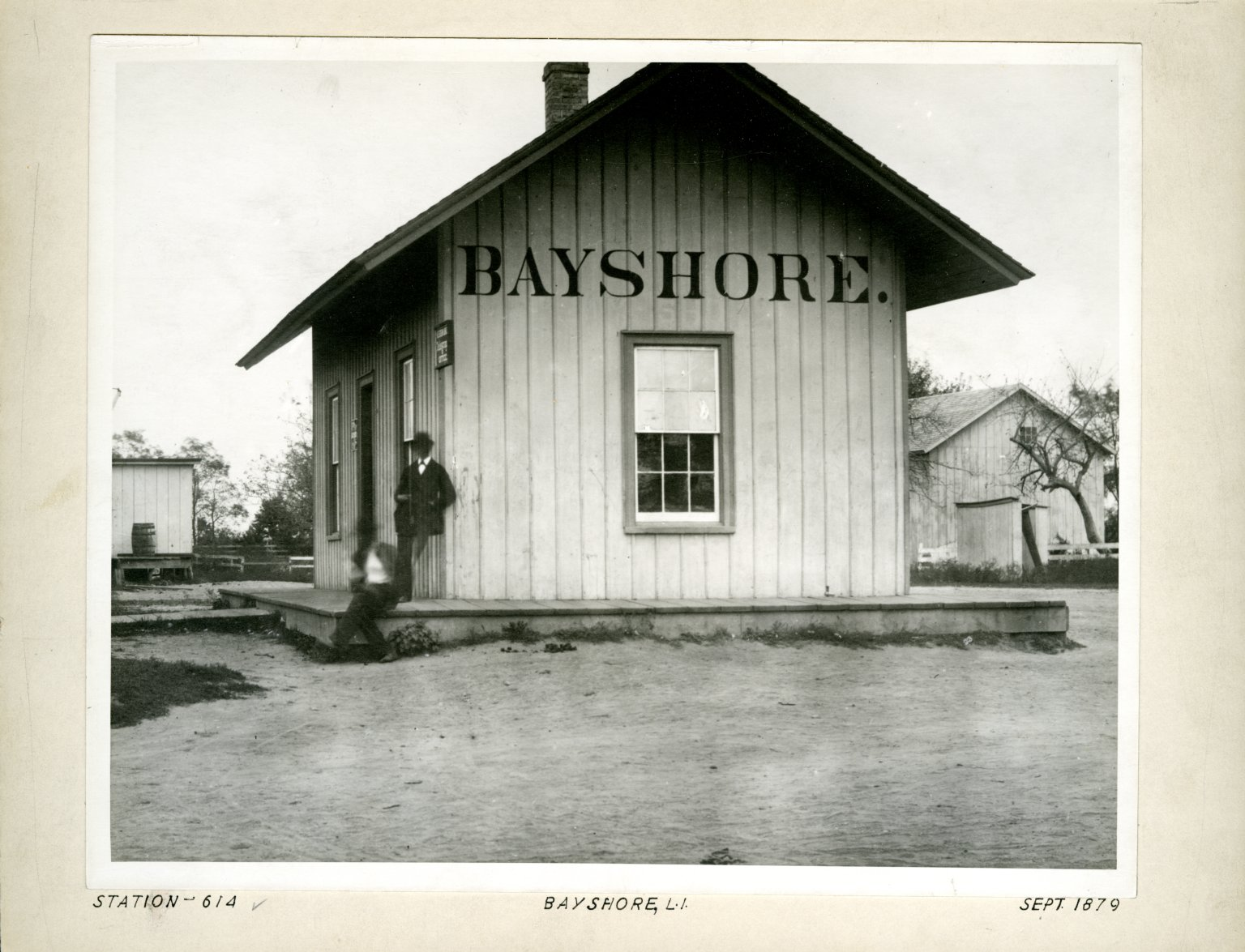
Station, Bay Shore, Long Island, September 1879., a collodion silver glass wet plate negative by George Bradford Brainerd now on display at the Brooklyn Museum

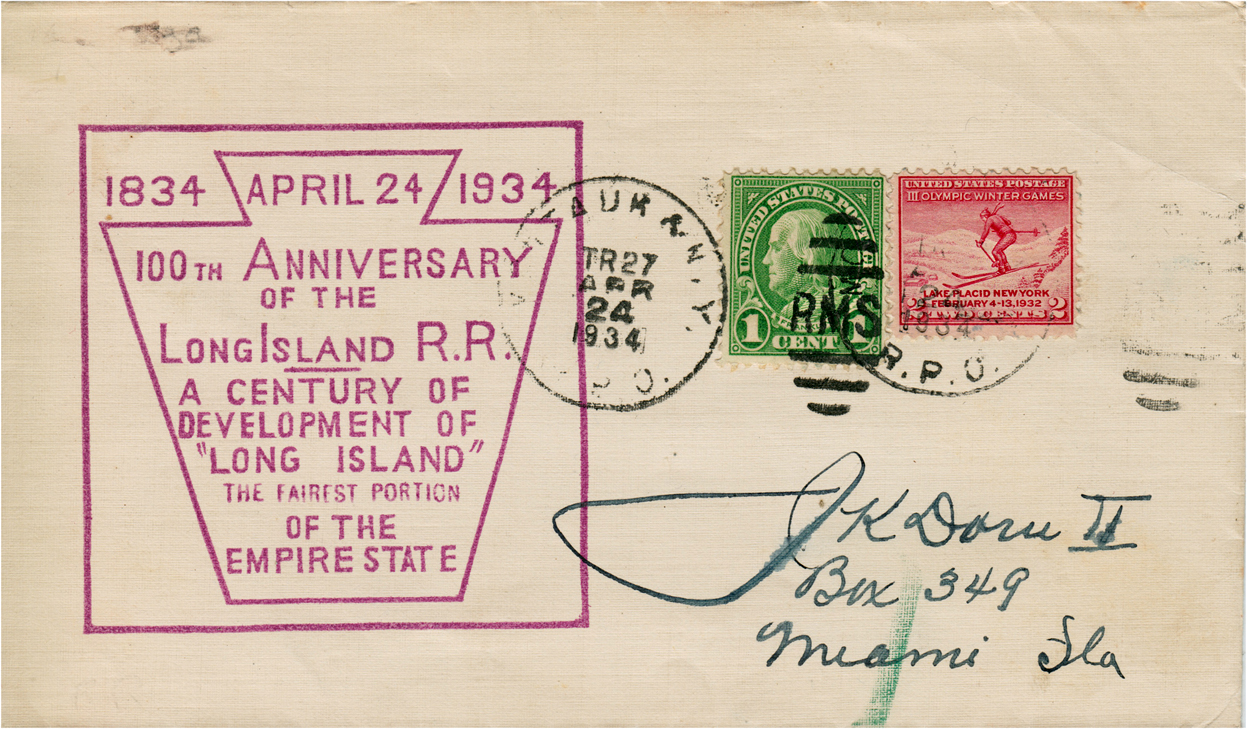
LIRR (Montauk & NY) RPO cover (TR27) for the railroad's 100th anniversary in April 1934

The Long Island Rail Road Company was chartered in 1834 to provide a daily service between New York City and Boston via a ferry connection between its Greenport, New York, terminal on Long Island's North Fork and Stonington, Connecticut. This service was superseded in 1849 by the land route through Connecticut that became part of the New York, New Haven and Hartford Railroad. The LIRR refocused its attentions towards serving Long Island, in competition with other railroads on the island. In the 1870s, railroad president Conrad Poppenhusen and his successor, Austin Corbin acquired all the railroads and consolidated them into the LIRR.

The LIRR was unprofitable for much of its history. In 1900, the Pennsylvania Railroad (PRR) bought a controlling interest as part of its plan for direct access to Manhattan, which began on September 8, 1910. The wealthy PRR subsidized the LIRR during the first half of the new century, allowing expansion and modernization. Electric operation began in 1905.

After World War II, the railroad industry's downturn and dwindling profits caused the PRR to stop subsidizing the LIRR and the LIRR went into receivership in 1949. The State of New York, realizing how important the railroad was to Long Island's future, began to subsidize the railroad in the 1950s and continued doing so into the 1960s. In June 1965, the state finalized an agreement to buy the LIRR from the PRR for $65 million. The LIRR was placed under the control of a new Metropolitan Commuter Transit Authority. The MCTA was rebranded the Metropolitan Transportation Authority in 1968 when it incorporated several other New York City-area transit agencies. With MTA subsidies the LIRR modernized further, continuing to be the busiest commuter railroad in the United States. The company was officially converted to a subsidiary public benefit corporation in 1980.

The LIRR is one of the few railroads that have survived as intact companies from their original charters to the present.

=== 21st-century expansions ===
==== East Side Access ====
The East Side Access project built a LIRR spur to Grand Central Terminal that will run in part via the lower level of the existing 63rd Street Tunnel. The East Side Access project added a new eight-track terminal called Grand Central Madison underneath the existing Grand Central Terminal. The project was first proposed in the 1968 Program for Action, but due to various funding shortfalls, construction did not start until 2007. As of April 2018, the project was expected to cost $11.1 billion and was tentatively scheduled to start service in December 2022. It opened on January 25, 2023, with limited shuttle service between Jamaica and Grand Central. Full service to Grand Central began on February 27, 2023.

Several "readiness projects" were also completed to increase peak-hour capacity across the LIRR system in preparation for expanded peak-hour service after the completion of East Side Access. The LIRR constructed a new platform for Atlantic Terminal-bound trains at Jamaica station, converting most Atlantic Branch service between these two stations into a high-frequency shuttle. The LIRR also installed a new storage track east of Massapequa and extended one east of Great Neck station, in addition to expanding the train yard at Ronkonkoma. An expansion of the yard at Port Washington was also proposed, but as of September 2022, the MTA has not come to an agreement with the Town of North Hempstead, resulting in the project being postponed indefinitely.

There are also plans to build a new station in the Queens neighborhood of Sunnyside, in between the New York terminals and the Woodside station, serving as a rail hub for all LIRR branches and potentially some Amtrak, Metro North (New Haven Line) and New Jersey Transit trains, as well. The Sunnyside station is to be built after the completion of East Side Access, due to current capacity constraints.

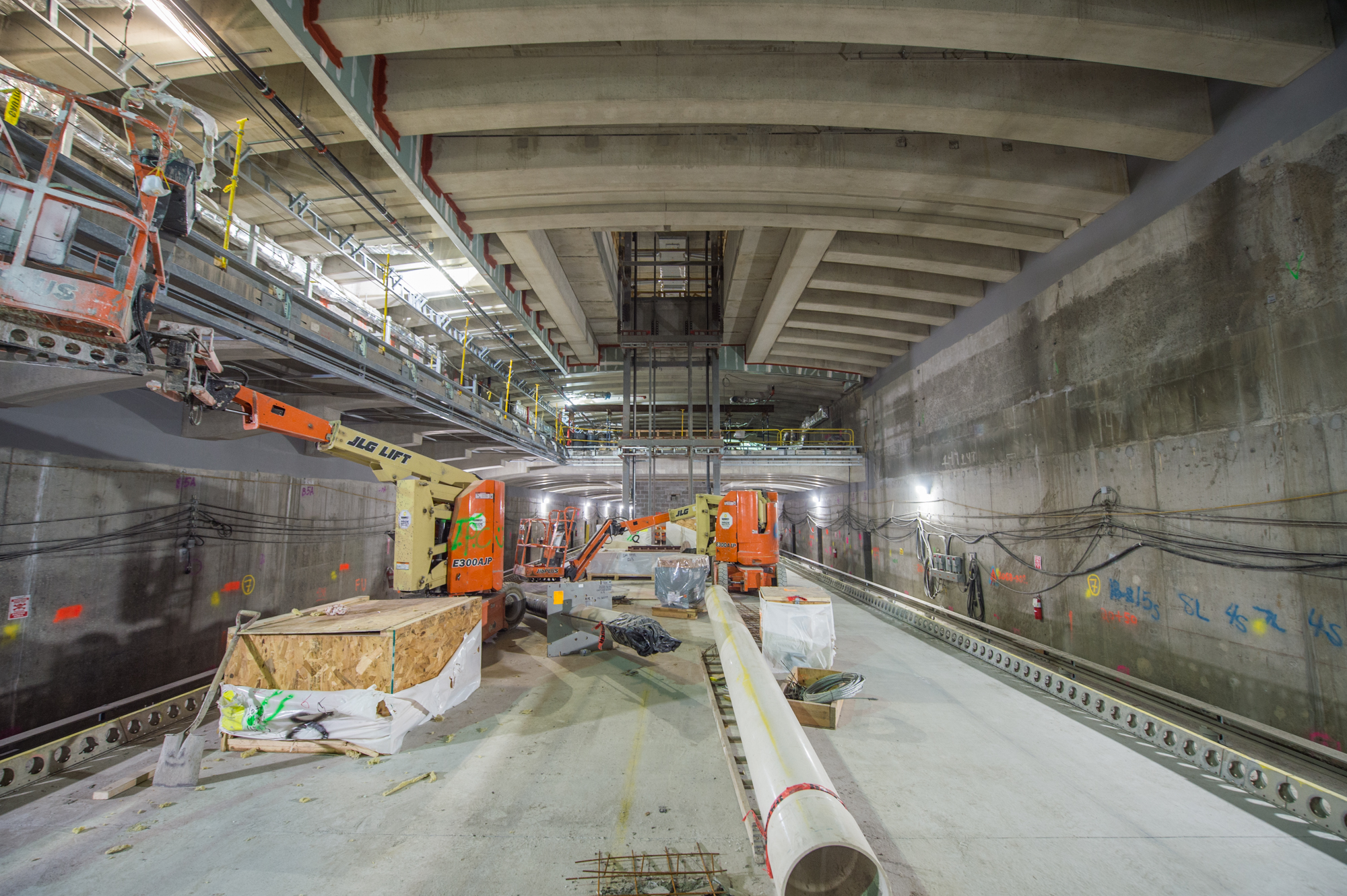
One of Grand Central Madison's lower-level platforms under construction in January 2019

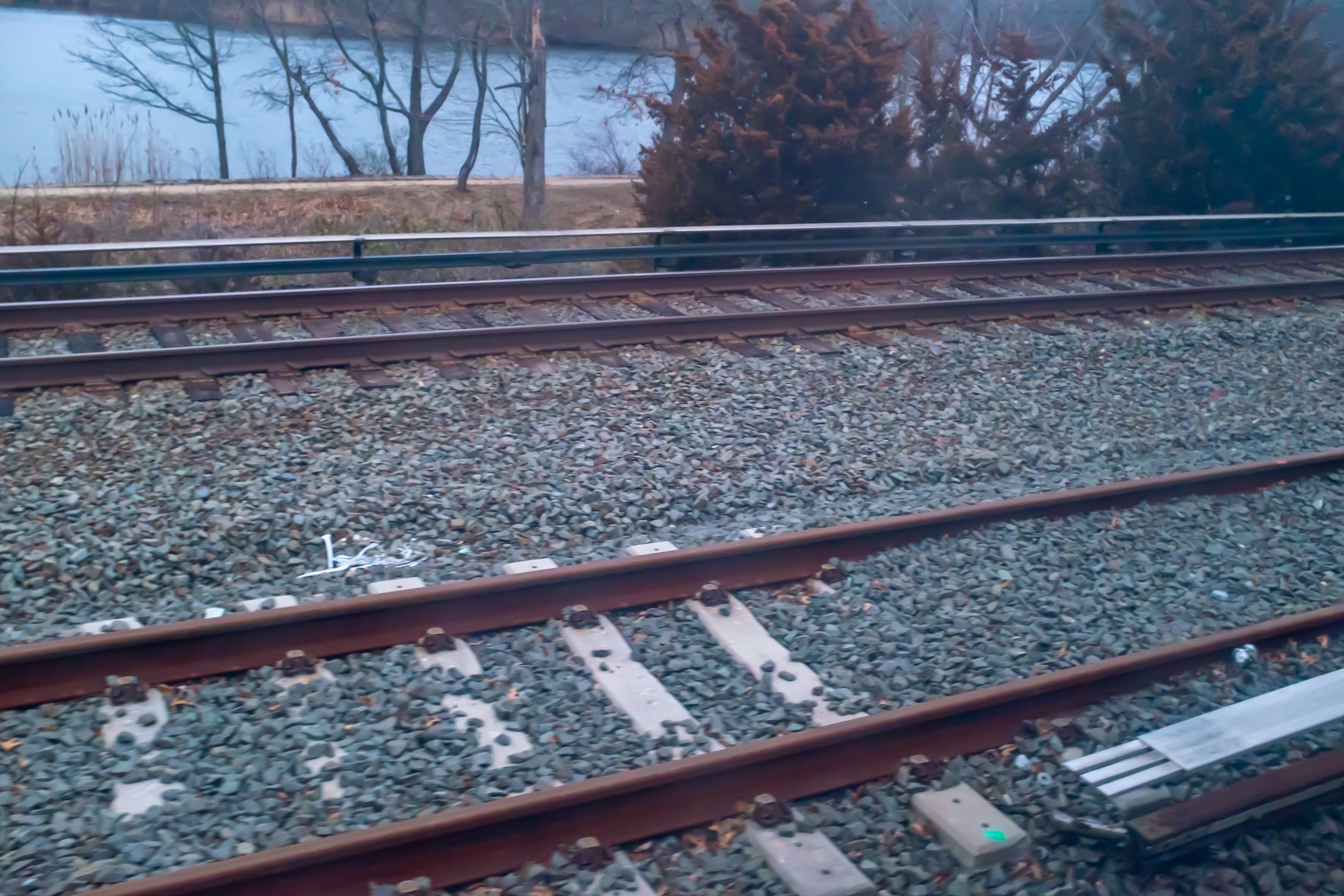
The new pocket track in Massapequa, located in between the two outer tracks, as viewed from a passing Babylon Branch train

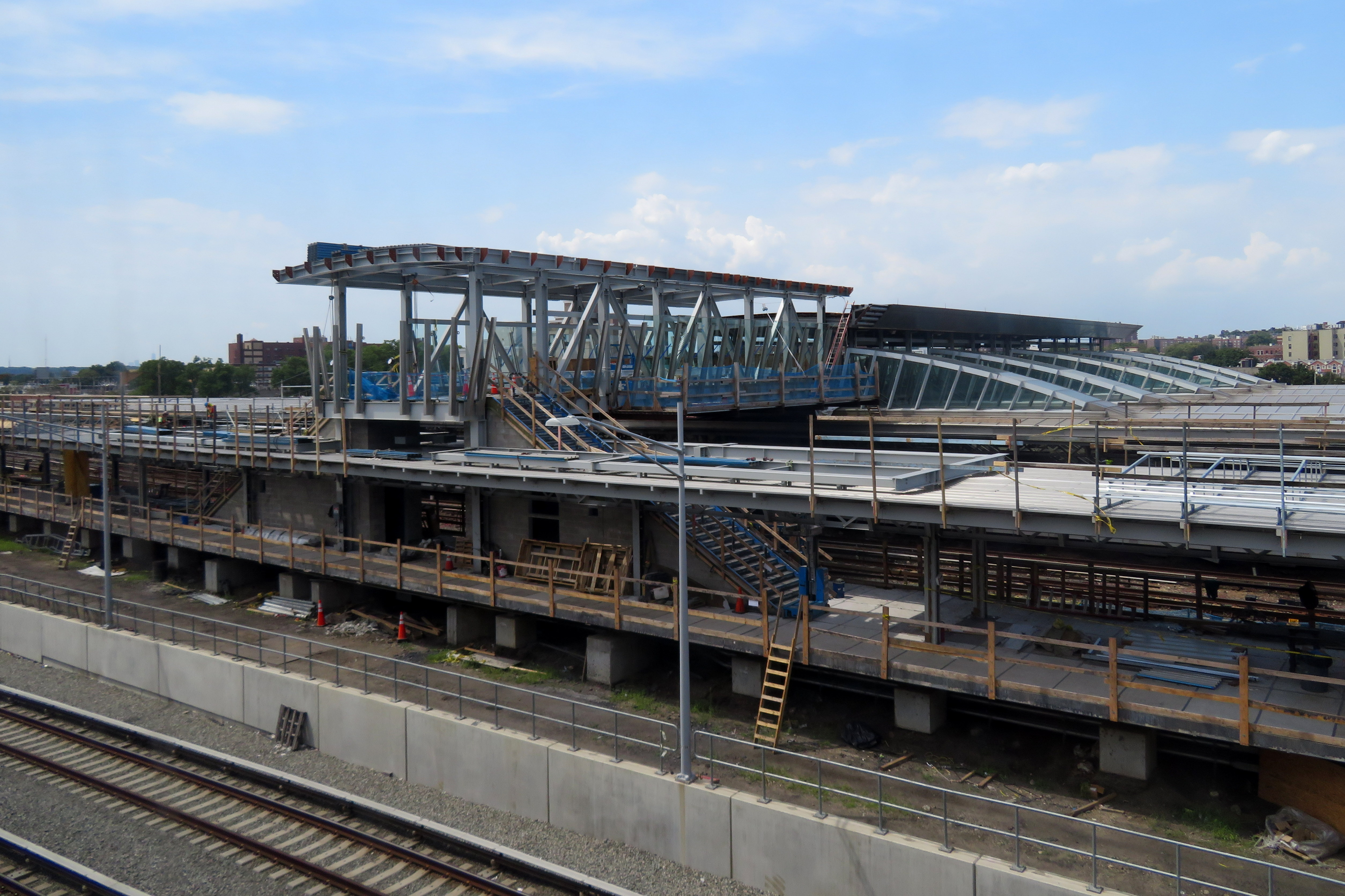
Construction on Jamaica's new platform in August 2019

==== Main Line projects ====
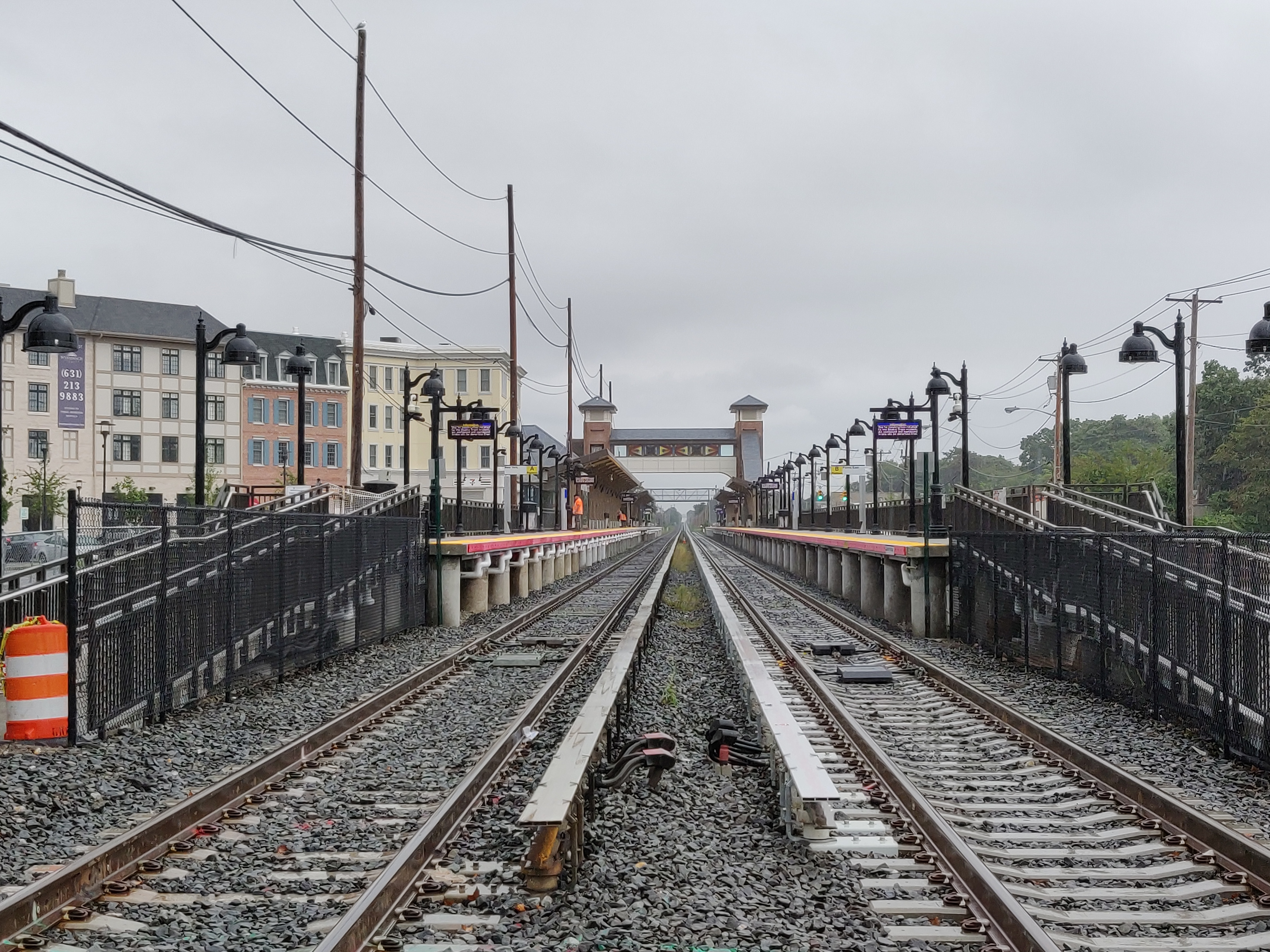
The Ronkonkoma Branch's completed second track at the Wyandanch station

In 2012, the LIRR started adding a second track along the formerly single-tracked section of the Main Line between Farmingdale and Ronkonkoma stations to increase track capacity and allow for enhanced service options. The project was completed in September 2018.

As part of the preparations for East Side Access's opening, the LIRR also widened the two-track sections of the Main Line between Floral Park and Hicksville stations to three tracks, in addition to eliminating each of the grade crossings and rebuilding all of the stations along this stretch of the Main Line. Work on the third-track project started in September 2018. The project was completed in 2022, in time for the opening of East Side Access.

The larger Belmont Park Redevelopment Project called for a new Elmont station between the Queens Village and Bellerose stations on the Main Line, to better serve the new UBS Arena in the Nassau County neighborhood of Elmont. It was the first new station built by the LIRR in nearly 50 years; the last new station added was the former Southampton College station on the Montauk Branch, which opened in 1976 and closed in 1998, due to low ridership and the high cost of installing high-level platforms for the then-new C3 railcars. Elmont's eastbound platform officially opened in November 2021, while the westbound platform opened in October 2022.

== Major stations ==
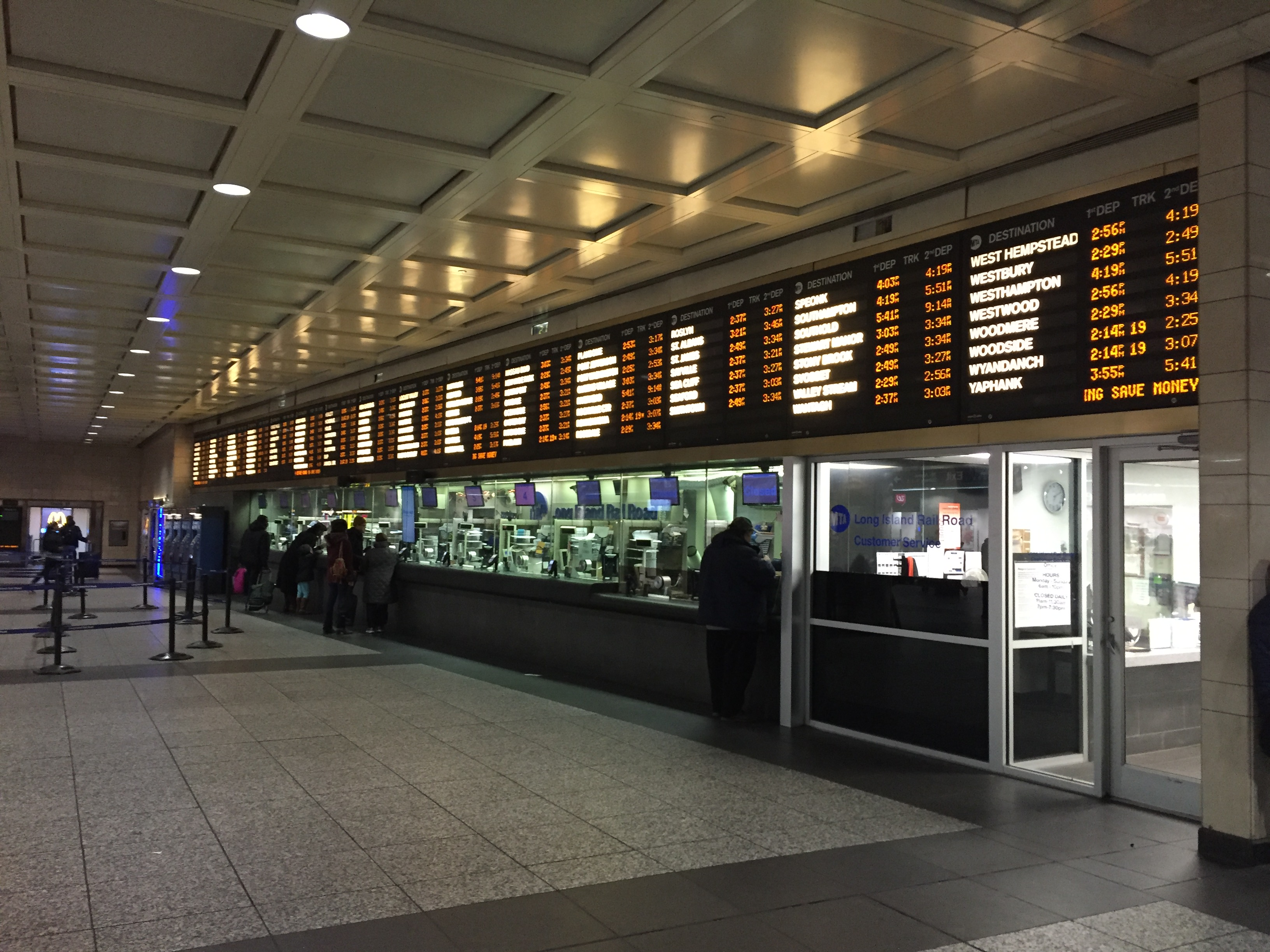
The former LIRR ticket counter at Penn Station, which displayed all locations accessible therefrom

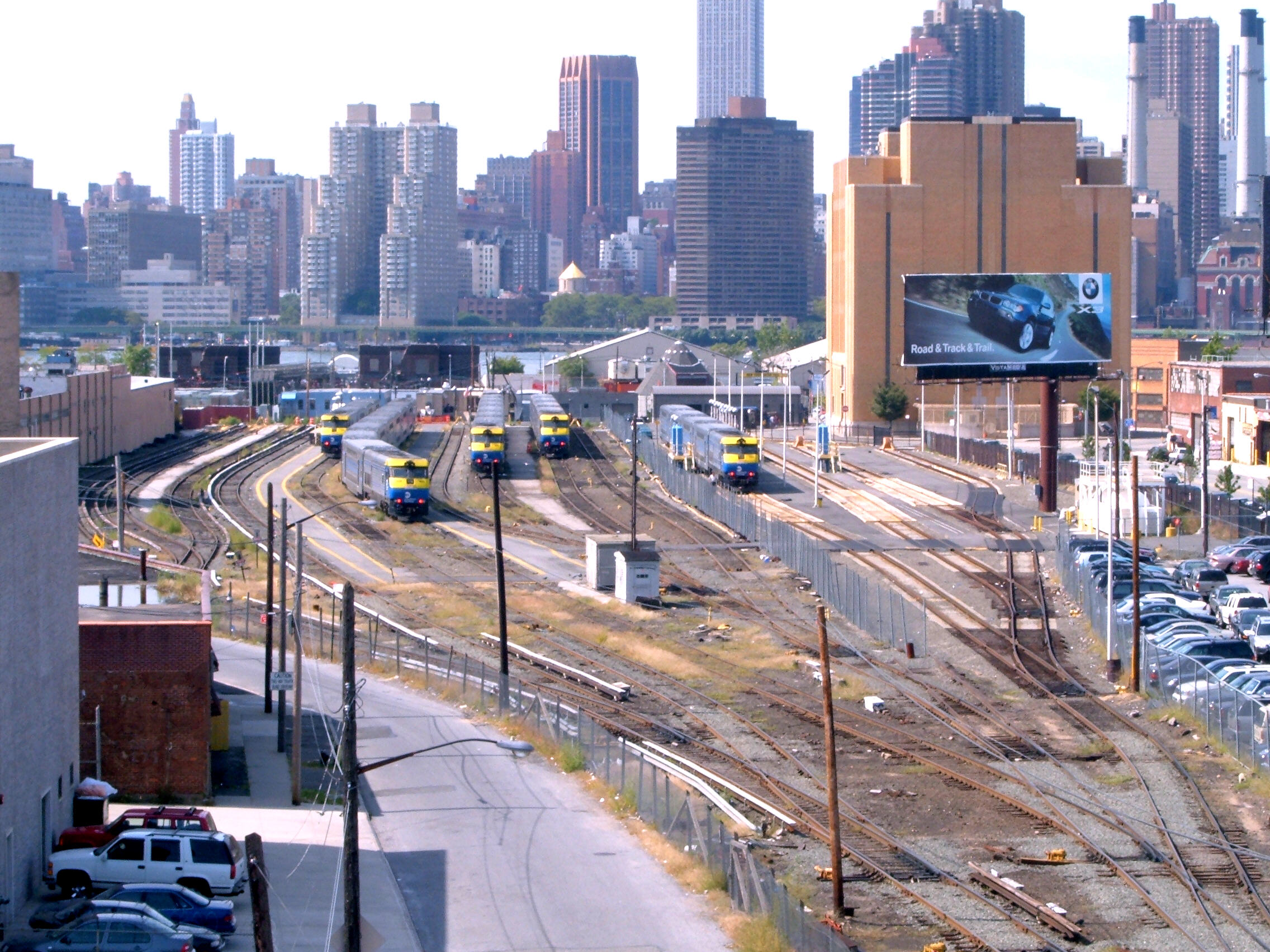
The Long Island City station and yard

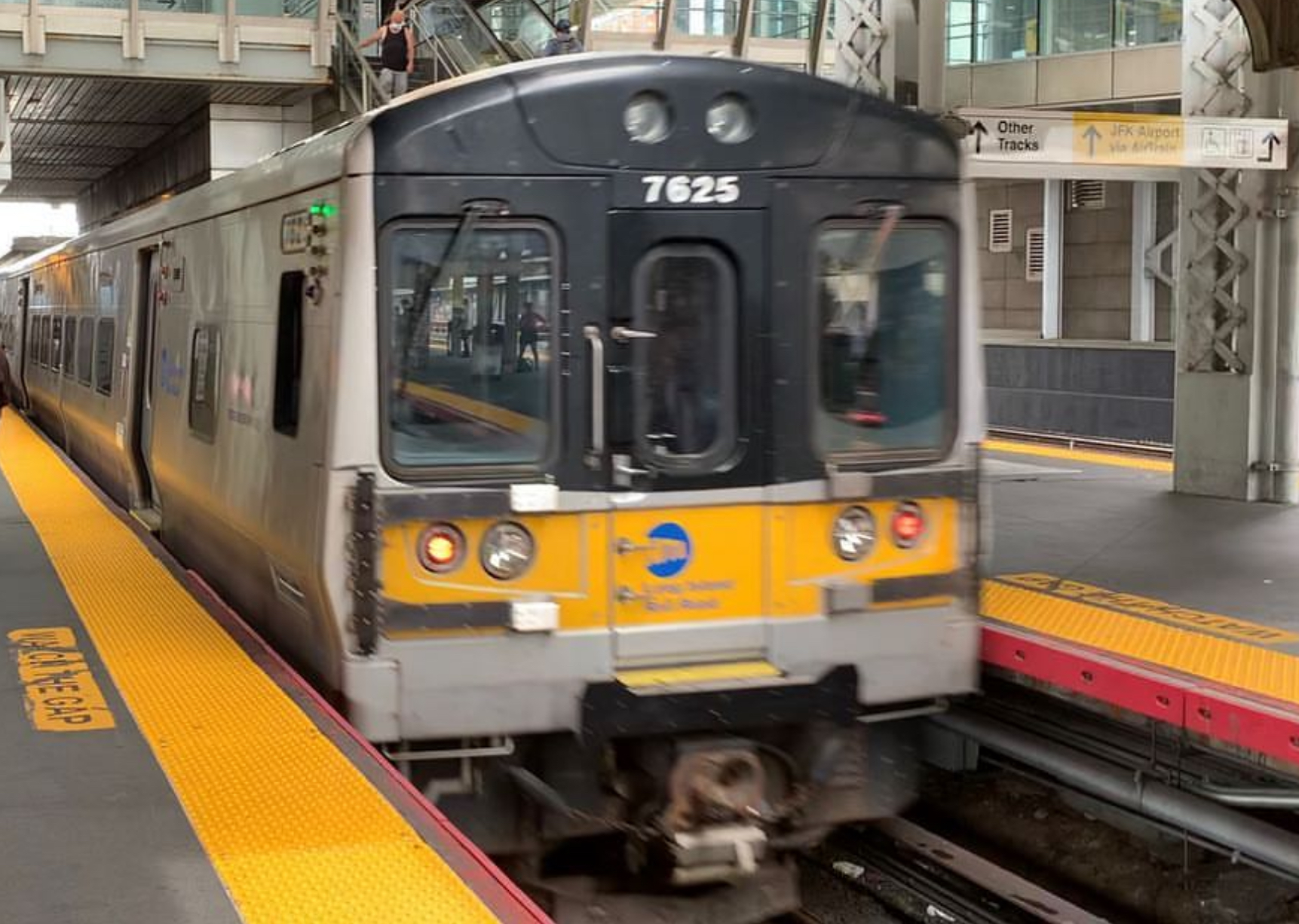
Long Island Railroad Bombardier-M7 number 7625 with an inbound train arriving at Jamaica station

The LIRR operates out of four western terminals in New York City. These terminals are:

- Pennsylvania Station, in Midtown Manhattan, is the busiest of the western terminals, serving almost 500 daily trains. It is reached via the Amtrak-owned East River Tunnels (the only LIRR-used trackage not owned by the LIRR) from the Main Line at Harold Interlocking in Long Island City. The New York City Subway's 34th Street–Penn Station (IRT Broadway–Seventh Avenue Line) (1, 2, and 3 trains) and 34th Street–Penn Station (IND Eighth Avenue Line) (A, C, and E trains) stations are adjacent to the terminal. It also connects LIRR with Amtrak and NJ Transit trains.
- Grand Central Madison is located under Grand Central Terminal and was built as part of the East Side Access project. Service to the new terminal began on January 25, 2023. Provision was made for this route on the lower level of the 63rd Street Tunnel under the East River, which carries the New York City Subway's IND 63rd Street Line (F and M trains) on its upper level. The East Side Access project is expected to reduce congestion while increasing the number of trains during peak hours. It serves as the primary terminal for the Hempstead Branch and serves all other electrified branches (as the LIRR's diesel fleet has a loading gauge too large for the 63rd Street Tunnel).
- Atlantic Terminal, formerly known as Flatbush Avenue, in Downtown Brooklyn serves the West Hempstead Branch, with limited service on other branches during the weekday peak. Other trains run as shuttles to Jamaica. It is next to the New York City Subway's Atlantic Avenue–Barclays Center station complex (2, 3, 4, 5, B, D, N, Q, R and W trains), providing easy access to Lower Manhattan. With the opening of East Side Access, service between Atlantic Terminal and Jamaica is served mostly by shuttles.
- Long Island City - certain rush-hour trains run to one of two stations in Long Island City, Queens: the Long Island City station on the East River, which is the oldest western terminal of the LIRR, or the Hunterspoint Avenue station, which is 0.6 miles to the east. From Hunterspoint Avenue, the Hunters Point Avenue subway station (7 and <7> trains) can be reached. The Long Island City station is near the Vernon Boulevard–Jackson Avenue subway station, also served by the 7 and <7> trains, and the Long Island City station also connects to the NYC Ferry's East River Ferry to Midtown or Lower Manhattan.

In addition, the Jamaica station is a major hub station and transfer point in Jamaica, Queens. It has ten tracks and six platforms, plus yard and bypass tracks. Passengers can transfer between trains on all LIRR lines except the Port Washington Branch. The sixth platform opened in February 2020, and exclusively serves Atlantic Branch shuttle trains to Brooklyn. Transfer is also made to separate facilities for three subway services at the Sutphin Boulevard–Archer Avenue–JFK Airport station (E, J, and Z trains), a number of bus routes, and the AirTrain automated people mover to JFK Airport. The railroad's headquarters are next to the station.

== Passenger lines and services ==
A schematic of the LIRR's routes and fare zones. This schematic is not to scale.

The Long Island Rail Road system has eleven passenger branches, three of which are main trunk lines:

- Main Line, running along the middle of the island, between Long Island City and Greenport, via Jamaica.
- Montauk Branch, running along the southern edge of the island, between Long Island City and Montauk, via Jamaica.
- Atlantic Branch, running mostly in New York City to the south of both the Main Line and Montauk Branch, between Atlantic Terminal and Valley Stream, via Jamaica.

There are eight minor branches. For scheduling and advertising purposes some of these branches are divided into sections; this is the case with the Montauk Branch, which is known as the Babylon Branch service in the electrified portion of the line between Jamaica and Babylon, while the diesel service beyond Babylon to Montauk is referred to as Montauk Branch service. All branches except the Port Washington Branch pass through Jamaica; the trackage west of Jamaica (except the Port Washington Branch) is known as the City Terminal Zone. The City Terminal Zone includes portions of the Main Line, Atlantic, and Montauk Branches, as well as the Amtrak-owned East River Tunnels to Penn Station.

=== Current branches ===
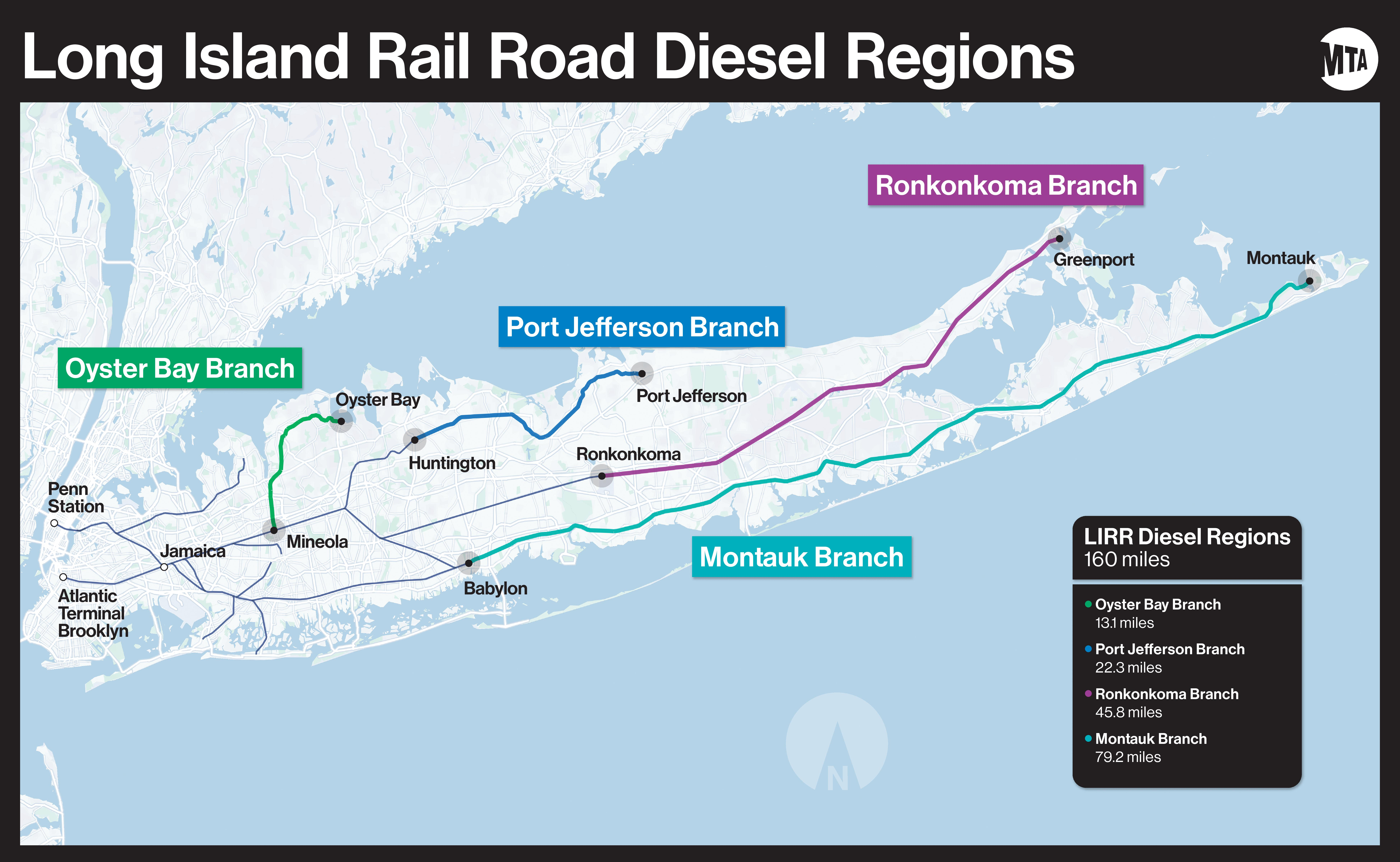
A map of diesel territory on the Long Island Rail Road

- The Main Line runs from Long Island City east to Greenport. It is electrified west of the Ronkonkoma station; limited diesel train service runs from this point to the Yaphank, Riverhead, or Greenport stations. Trains using the East River Tunnels from Penn Station join the line at Sunnyside Yard. The services that run along this line are named after the branches they use; trains beyond Hicksville, where the Port Jefferson Branch diverges, are known as Ronkonkoma Branch and Greenport Branch trains.
- The Montauk Branch runs from Long Island City east to the Montauk station, with junctions with the Main Line at Long Island City and Jamaica. It is electrified from Jamaica east to Babylon. Trains operating east of Babylon are listed as Montauk Branch service and are hauled by diesel locomotives, while trains using the line from Jamaica to Babylon are labeled as Babylon Branch trains. The portion of the line between Long Island City and Jamaica, known as the Lower Montauk Branch, no longer carries passenger trains and is used only for freight service.
- The electrified Atlantic Branch runs from Atlantic Terminal in Downtown Brooklyn east to Jamaica, where it meets the Main Line and the Montauk Branch, and then heads southeast to become the Long Beach Branch east of Valley Stream. East of Valley Stream, the Far Rockaway Branch turns south, while the West Hempstead Branch turns northward.
- The electrified Port Washington Branch, the only one that does not serve Jamaica, branches from the Main Line west of Woodside (running parallel to the Main Line until Winfield Junction, which is east of that station) and runs east to Port Washington. It only serves four stations in Nassau County. It includes the Manhasset Viaduct, which is the highest bridge on the LIRR network.
- The Port Jefferson Branch splits from the Main Line east of Hicksville, with electric service to Huntington. The section from Huntington to Port Jefferson is served only by diesel trains. Until 1938, it continued east to Wading River.
- The electrified Hempstead Branch splits from the Main Line east of Elmont (running parallel to the Main Line until just after Floral Park) and runs east to Hempstead. At Garden City, the Garden City–Mitchel Field Secondary curves off and goes to Mitchel Field.
- The electrified West Hempstead Branch splits from the Montauk Branch east of the Valley Stream station and runs northeast to West Hempstead, originally continuing to junctions with the Hempstead Branch and the Oyster Bay Branch at the Main Line.
- The Oyster Bay Branch splits from the Main Line east of Mineola and heads north and east to Oyster Bay. The first section to East Williston is electrified; only diesel trains run along the majority of the line to Oyster Bay.
- The diesel-only Central Branch runs southeast from the Main Line east of Bethpage to the Montauk Branch west of the Babylon station, giving an alternate route to the Montauk Branch east of Babylon. The Central Branch used to continue west from Bethpage to include what is now the Garden City–Mitchel Field Secondary. It was proposed to be electrified as part of the 2020–2024 MTA Capital Program.
- The electrified Far Rockaway Branch splits from the Atlantic Branch east of the Valley Stream station and runs south and southwest to Far Rockaway. It used to connect westward to what is now the New York City Subway's IND Rockaway Line to the Hammels and Rockaway Park neighborhoods of Queens.
- The electrified Long Beach Branch begins where the Atlantic Branch ends east of the Valley Stream station (running parallel to the Montauk Branch until just after Lynbrook) where it turns south to end at Long Beach.

=== Former branches ===
The railroad has dropped a number of branches due to lack of ridership over the years. Part of the Rockaway Beach Branch became part of the IND Rockaway Line of the New York City Subway, while others were downgraded to freight branches, and the rest abandoned entirely. Additionally, the Long Island Rail Road operated trains over portions of the Brooklyn Rapid Transit (BRT) elevated and subway lines until 1917.

- The Bethpage Branch ran north from the Main Line and Central Branch at Bethpage.
- The Bushwick Branch, also called the Bushwick Lead Track, is a freight railroad branch that runs from Bushwick, Brooklyn, to Fresh Pond Junction in Queens, where it connects with the Montauk Branch.
- The Camp Upton Branch was a short branch north from the Main Line to Camp Upton.
- The Cedarhurst Cut-off, officially known as the New York and Rockaway Railroad, was an extension of the Montauk Branch from its merger with the Atlantic Branch at Springfield Junction to Cedarhurst, where it would turn west and run parallel to the Far Rockaway Branch until reaching Mott Avenue in Far Rockaway.
- The Central Extension ran from Garden City eastward to Central Park (¾ mile south of current Bethpage station) and as far east as Bethpage Junction. The line was cut back to the point where it stopped at Island Trees. Today the western part of track still in use for freight and storage, and is officially known today as the Garden City Secondary.
- The Chestnut Street Incline (Brooklyn) between Atlantic Avenue and Fulton Street was opened in 1898 to allow for thru-operation over the Jamaica/Broadway Elevated Line to the East River ferry terminal. In 1909 thru passenger service to Manhattan via the Williamsburg Bridge was established in coordination with the Brooklyn Rapid Transit Company (BRT). LIRR Passenger service operated to Chambers Street between May 1909 and September 1917.
- The Creedmoor Branch, a remnant of the Central Railroad of Long Island (CRRLI) of Alexander Turney Stewart, was a short branch from the Main Line at Floral Park northwest through Creedmoor. It once went as far northwest as Flushing.
- The Evergreen Branch connected the Bushwick Branch east of Bushwick Terminal with the Bay Ridge Branch north of East New York.
- The Flushing Bay Freight Spur extended north from the Whitestone Branch, then across the Woodside Branch and then the connecting line between both branches before terminating along the south coast of Flushing Bay.
- The Glendale Cut-off ran south from the Main Line at Rego Park to the Montauk Branch at Glendale. There it became the Rockaway Beach Branch, running south across Jamaica Bay to Hammels and west to Rockaway Park. The Rockaway Beach Branch south of Ozone Park is now the IND Rockaway Line of the New York City Subway.
- The Manhattan Beach Branch ran south from the Bay Ridge Branch at Flatbush to Manhattan Beach.
- The Manorville Branch or Manor Branch ran from the Main Line at Manorville southeast to the Montauk Branch at Eastport. It was originally part of the Sag Harbor Branch (See below).
- The Mineola-West Hempstead Branch ran north of the terminus of the West Hempstead Branch across NY 24 to Country Life Press Station where it briefly joined the Hempstead Branch then ran north of the Garden City Secondary towards a wye at Mineola Station with one branch that terminated at the station and another that crossed the main line and ended near the southern terminus of the Oyster Bay Branch.
- The Montauk Cut-off was a short connecting track between the Lower Montauk Branch and the Main Line in Long Island City that allowed trains to change direction without entering the Long Island City station.
- The Northport Branch ran northeast of the current Port Jefferson Branch between Greenlawn and Northport Village.
- The North Shore Freight Branch ran from the Main Line at Sunnyside Yard west to the East River where Gantry Plaza State Park is now. Originally built by the Flushing and North Side Railroad, some of the surviving right-of-way can be found at the Arch Street Shops within the Sunnyside Yard.
- The Roosevelt Field Spur branched off northward from the current Garden City Secondary just north of Commercial Avenue. From there, it crossed Stewart Avenue just west of present-day South Street before turning slightly northeast, crossing over the Meadowbrook Parkway. The overpass, as well as sections along the sidewalk on South Street, can still be seen today. From there, it continued north before curving east and coming to an end near Zeckendorf Boulevard. The line was used for freight only.
- The Sag Harbor Branch ran north from the Montauk Branch at Bridgehampton to Sag Harbor.
- The Wading River Branch ran east from Port Jefferson to Wading River, serving the towns of Mount Sinai, Miller Place, Rocky Point, and Shoreham.
- The White Line, which was built by the LIRR subsidiary Newtown and Flushing Railroad ran south of the Port Washington Branch between Winfield Junction and Flushing between 1873 and 1876.
- The Whitestone Branch, which was originally built by the Flushing and North Side Railroad (F&NS), split from the Port Washington Branch near Mets–Willets Point station and ran north and east to Whitestone.
- The Woodside Branch ran north of the current Port Washington Branch between Woodside and east of the present Corona Yard west of the Flushing River. It also had a connecting spur to the Whitestone Branch.

=== Current services ===
As of the November 2025 timetable change, the typical off-peak service is as follows:

==== Atlantic Terminal ====
- 3 trains per hour (tph) to Jamaica

==== Grand Central ====
- 1tph to Massapequa
- 1tph to Far Rockaway
- 1tph to West Hempstead
- 1tph to Hempstead
- 1tph to Port Washington

==== Penn ====
- 2tph to Babylon
- 2tph to Ronkonkoma
- 2tph to Huntington
- 1tph to Port Washington
- 1tph to Long Beach

=== Additional services ===
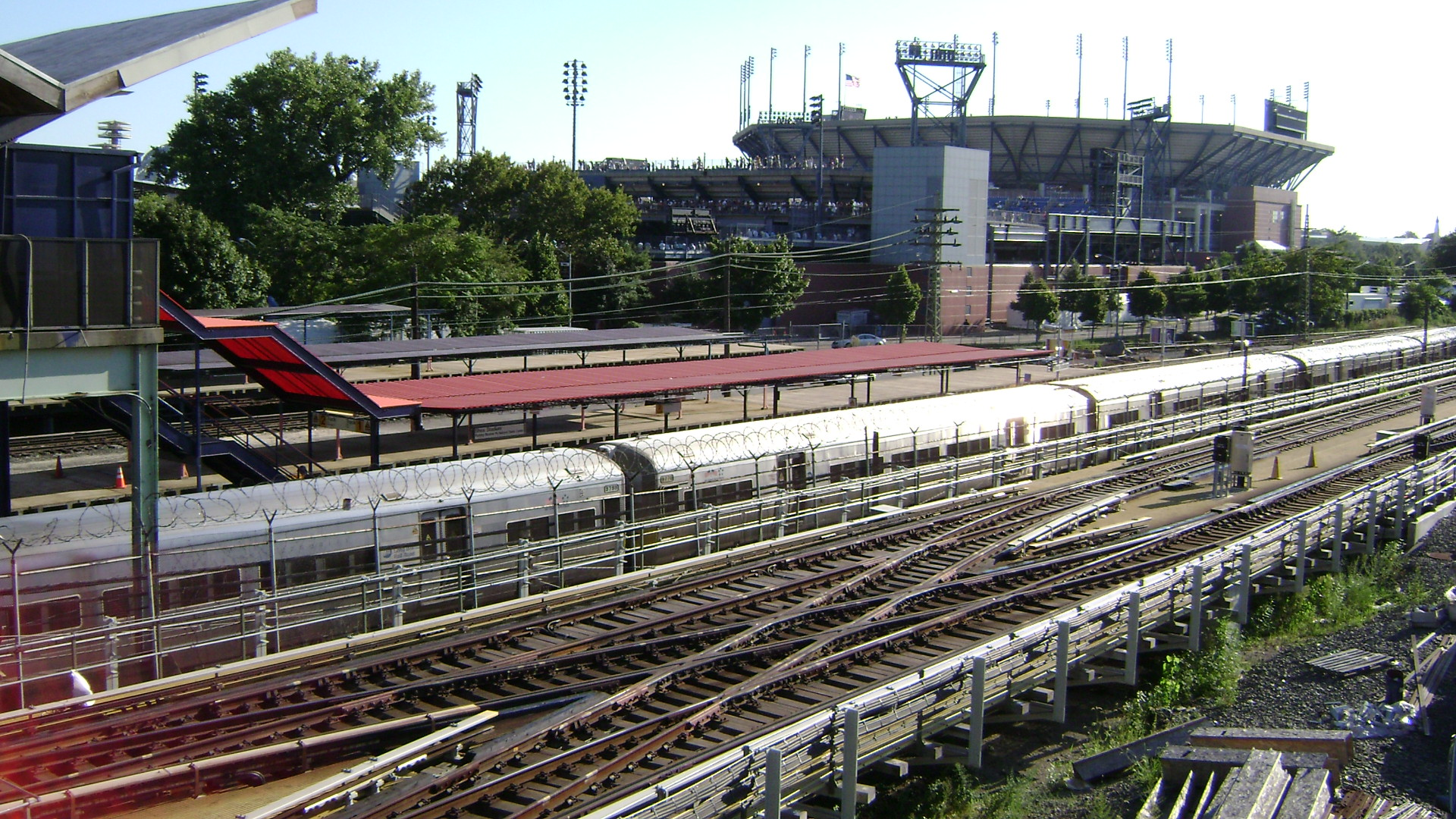
The Mets-Willets Point station in 2007

In addition to its daily commuter patronage, the LIRR also offers the following services:

- The railroad operates extra trains during the summer season that cater to the Long Island beach trade. Special package ticket deals are offered to places like Long Beach, Jones Beach, the Hamptons, Montauk, and Greenport. Some of these packages require bus and ferry connections.
- The railroad operates extra trains to and from Atlantic Terminal for Brooklyn Nets home games at Barclays Center.
- From May through October, the railroad runs four daily trains to Belmont Park (two in each direction) during the racetrack's summer meets. Additionally, on the day of the Belmont Stakes horse race the railroad runs extra trains to accommodate the large number of spectators attending the event.
- One special non-passenger service offered by the railroad was the yearly operation of the Ringling Brothers Barnum and Bailey Circus train between Long Island City and Nassau Veterans Memorial Coliseum in Uniondale. Highly publicized by the LIRR, this event drew large crowds of spectators. With Ringling Bros. Barnum and Bailey's closure, this was discontinued in May 2017.

=== Intermodal connections ===
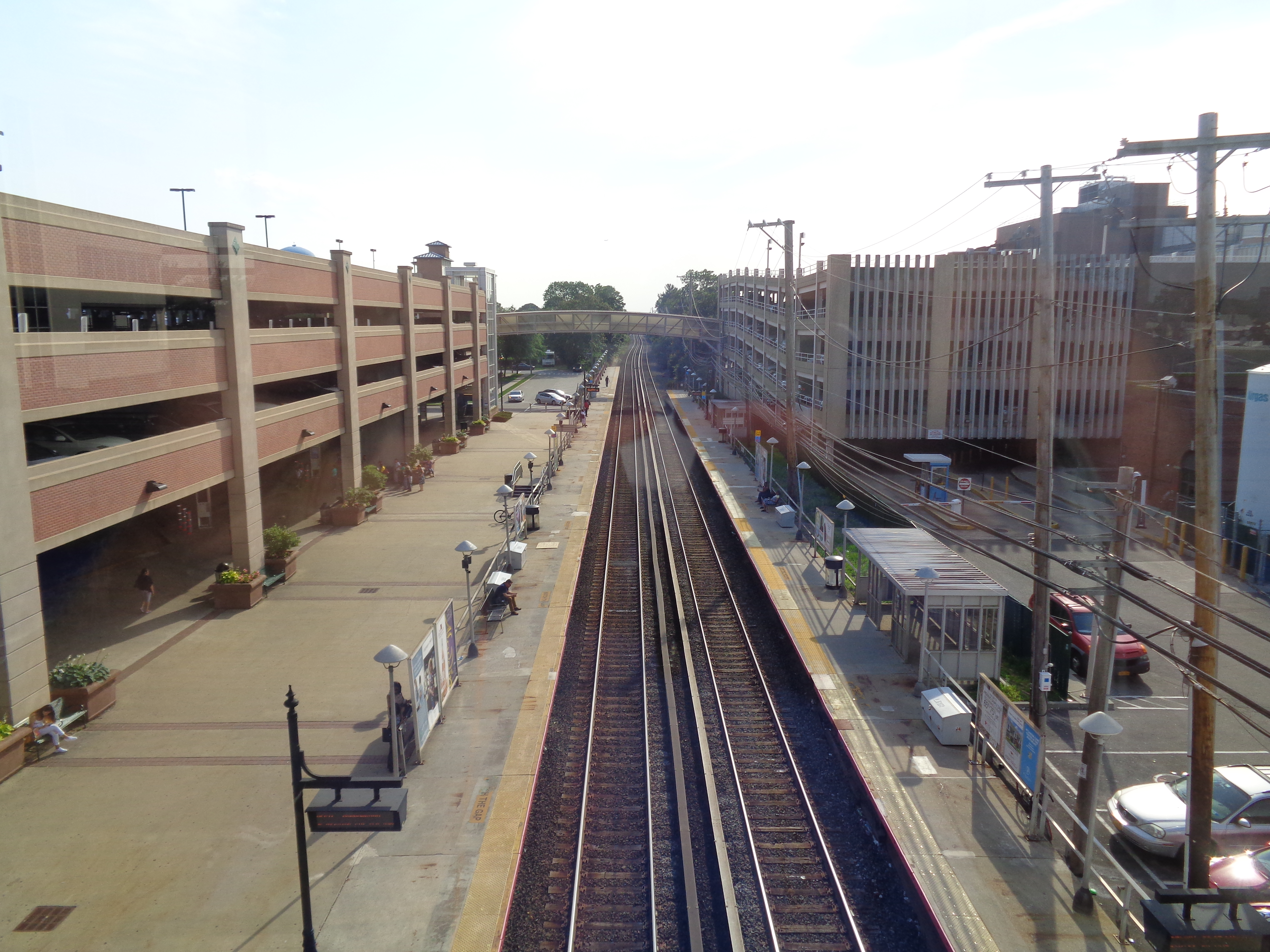
The Mineola Intermodal Center, prior to the Main Line's third track being built

Penn Station offers connections with Amtrak intercity trains and NJ Transit commuter trains, as well as the PATH, New York City Subway, and New York City Bus systems. Grand Central offers connections with Metro-North Railroad, as well as the subway and bus systems. Additionally, almost all stations in Brooklyn and Queens offer connections with the New York City Bus system, and several stations also have transfers to New York City Subway stations. Transfers to Nassau Inter-County Express and Suffolk County Transit buses are available at many stations in Nassau and Suffolk counties, respectively.

== Fare structure ==
Like Metro-North Railroad and NJ Transit, the Long Island Rail Road fare system is based on the distance a passenger travels, as opposed to the New York City Subway and the area's bus systems, which charge a flat rate. The railroad is broken up into eight non-consecutively numbered fare zones. Zone 1, the City Terminal Zone, includes Penn Station, Grand Central, all stations in Brooklyn, all stations in Queens west of Jamaica on the Main Line, and Mets–Willets Point.

Zone 3 includes Jamaica as well as all other stations in eastern Queens except Far Rockaway. Zones 4 and 7 include all stations in Nassau County, plus Far Rockaway and Belmont Park in Queens. Zones 9, 10, 12 and 14 include all stations in Suffolk County. Each zone contains many stations, and the same fare applies for travel between any station in the origin zone and any station in the destination zone.

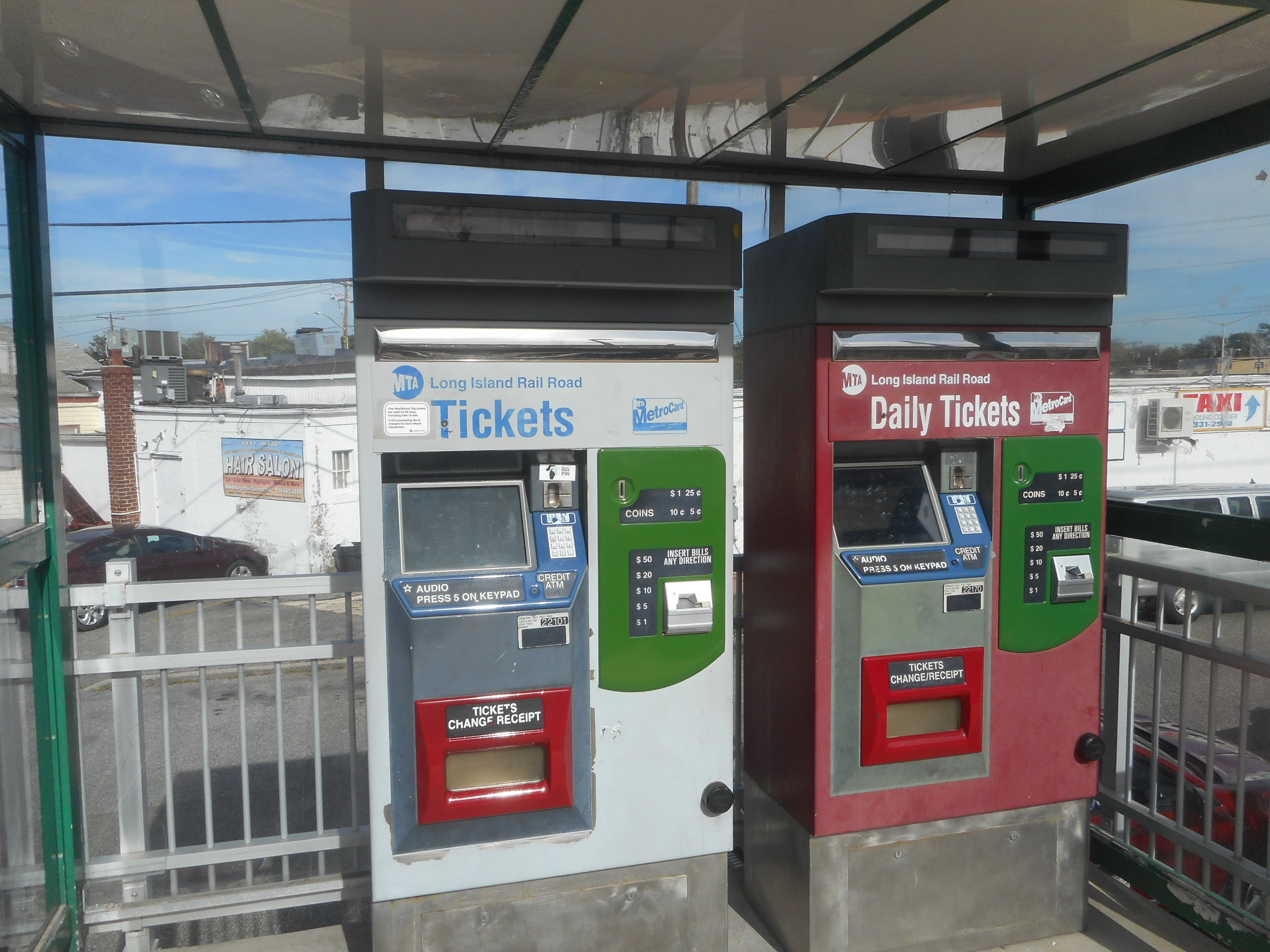
LIRR ticket vending machines at the Bethpage station

=== Peak and off-peak fares ===
Peak fares are charged during the week on trains that arrive at western terminals between 6 AM and 10 AM, and for trains that depart from western terminals between 4 PM and 8 PM. Any passenger holding an off-peak ticket on a peak train is required to pay a step up fee. Passengers can buy tickets from ticket agents or ticket vending machines (TVMs) or on the train from conductors, but will incur an on-board penalty fee for doing so. This fee is waived for customers boarding at a station without a ticket office or ticket machine, senior citizens, people with disabilities or Medicare customers.

There are several types of tickets: one way, round trip, peak, off-peak, AM peak or off-peak senior/disabled, peak child, and off-peak child. On off-peak trains, passengers can buy a family ticket for children who are accompanied by an 18-year-old for $0.75 if bought from the station agent or TVM, $1.00 on the train. Senior citizen/disabled passengers traveling during the morning peak hours are required to pay the AM peak senior citizen/disabled rate. This rate is not charged during PM peak hours.

Commuters can also buy a peak or off-peak ten trip ride, a weekly unlimited or an unlimited monthly pass. Monthly passes are good on any train regardless of the time of day, within the fare zones specified on the pass.

The LIRR charged off-peak fares at all times during the COVID-19 pandemic. Peak fares were reinstated on March 1, 2022, and several new discounts and ticket options were introduced at the same time.

=== Special fares ===
During the summer the railroad offers special summer package ticket deals to places such as Long Beach, Jones Beach, the Hamptons, Montauk, and Greenport. Passengers traveling to the Hamptons and Montauk on the Cannonball can reserve a seat in the all-reserved Parlor Cars.

Prior to November 2021, passengers going to Belmont Park had to buy a special ticket to go from Jamaica to Belmont Park (or vice versa). Weekly and monthly passes were not accepted at Belmont Park. With the opening of Elmont station in November 2021, Belmont Park and Elmont were placed into fare zone 4.

=== CityTicket ===
In 2003, the LIRR and Metro-North started a pilot program in which passengers traveling within New York City were allowed to buy one-way tickets for $2.50. The special reduced-fare CityTicket, proposed by the New York City Transit Riders Council, was formally introduced in 2004. The discounted fares were initially only available for travel on Saturdays and Sundays. In March 2022, it was expanded to include all off-peak trains throughout the week for $5. The MTA announced plans in December 2022 to allow CityTickets to be used on peak trains as well; governor Kathy Hochul confirmed these plans the next month. The peak CityTickets, as announced in July 2023, would cost $7 each. As part of a one-year pilot program starting in July 2024, monthly tickets for LIRR trips entirely within New York City would also receive a 10% discount.

CityTicket is valid for travel within Zones 1 and 3 on the Long Island Rail Road. CityTickets can only be bought before boarding – except at Mets–Willets Point, where they can be purchased on board; they must be used on the day of purchase.

CityTicket is not valid for travel to the Elmont station (located in Nassau County, just east of the Queens-Nassau border) – or the Far Rockaway or special event-only Belmont Park station (located in Queens, just west of the Queens-Nassau border) – and are all within Zone 4.

Long Island Rail Road stations where CityTickets are valid
Zone 1	Zone 3
Penn Station	Jamaica
Grand Central	Hollis
Woodside	Queens Village
Forest Hills	St. Albans
Kew Gardens	Locust Manor
Atlantic Terminal	Laurelton
Nostrand Avenue	Rosedale
East New York	Flushing-Main Street
Long Island City	Murray Hill
Hunterspoint Avenue	Broadway
Mets-Willets Point	Auburndale
	Bayside
Douglaston
Little Neck

=== Freedom Ticket ===
In late 2017, the MTA was slated to launch a pilot that will allow LIRR, bus and subway service to use one ticket. The proposal for the ticket, called the "Freedom Ticket," was initially put forth by the New York City Transit Riders Council (NYCTRC) in 2007. The NYCTRC wrote a proof of concept report in 2015. At the time of the report, express bus riders from Southeast Queens had some of the longest commutes in the city, with their commutes being 96 minutes long, yet they paid a premium fare of $6.50.

Riders who take the dollar van to the subway paid $4.75 to get to Manhattan in 65 minutes; riders who only took the bus and subway paid $2.75 to get to Manhattan in 86 minutes; and riders who took the LIRR paid $10 to get to Manhattan in 35 minutes. Unlike the CityTicket, the Freedom Ticket would be valid for off-peak and multidirectional travel; have free transfers to the subway and bus system; and be capped at $215 per month. At the time, monthly CityTickets cost $330 per month.

The Freedom Ticket will initially be available for sale at the Atlantic Terminal, Nostrand Avenue, and East New York stations in Brooklyn and at the Laurelton, Locust Manor, Rosedale, and St. Albans stations in Queens. Riders, under the pilot, would be able to purchase one-way, weekly, or monthly passes that will be valid on the LIRR, on buses, and the subway. The fare will be higher than the price of a ride on the MetroCard, but it will be lower than the combined price of an LIRR ticket and a MetroCard, and it will allow unlimited free transfers between the LIRR, buses, and subway.

The former head of the MTA, Thomas Prendergast, announced at the January 2017 board meeting that the plan would be explored in a field study to determine fares and the impact on existing service. The plan is intended to fill approximately 20,000 unused seats of existing trains to Atlantic Terminal and Penn Station (or about 50% to 60% of peak trains in each direction), while at the same time providing affordable service to people with long commutes. The details were to be announced in spring 2017, and the pilot would last six months.

The MTA Board voted to approve a six-month pilot for a similar concept, the Atlantic Ticket, in May 2018. The Atlantic Ticket is similar in that it would allow LIRR riders in southeast Queens to purchase a one-way ticket to or from Atlantic Terminal for $5. The Atlantic Ticket would start in June 2018. The success of the pilot program has led the MTA to extend the program up to the summer of 2020 and renewed calls for the program to be implemented within New York City, where the fare for the Freedom Ticket—if approved—would cost US$2.75 and include free transfers between the LIRR & Metro-North, bus, and subway.

=== Far Rockaway Ticket ===
In May 2023, the MTA announced that, as part of wider fare changes and in response to requests from Far Rockaway residents, a discounted ticket option – the Far Rockaway Ticket – would be introduced for travelers traveling on the Far Rockaway Branch between Far Rockaway and other stations within New York City (excluding Belmont Park). This new ticket would provide the same discounts as a regular CityTicket, while also having protections against fare evasion, given the unique nature of the Far Rockaway Branch's route. Tickets can only be purchased at the Far Rockaway station or on the MTA's TrainTime app in the station's vicinity; geolocation restrictions on the TrainTime app only allow purchase of discounted tickets within the vicinity of the Far Rockaway station.

The Far Rockaway Ticket became available for purchase on August 20, 2023.

=== OMNY ===
In 2017, it was announced that the MetroCard fare payment system, used on New York City-area rapid transit and bus systems, would be phased out and replaced by OMNY, a contactless fare payment system. Fare payment would be made using Apple Pay, Google Pay, debit/credit cards with near-field communication enabled, or radio-frequency identification cards. As part of the implementation of OMNY, the MTA also plans to use the system in the Long Island Rail Road and Metro-North Railroad.

=== Combo Ticket ===
In December 2022, the MTA announced the launch of an additional fare for use on journeys that utilize both of its railroad systems via Grand Central. The fare is priced as $8 more than an adult off-peak ticket from an origin station on one system to Grand Central. It is valid on both peak and off-peak trains.

== Train operations ==
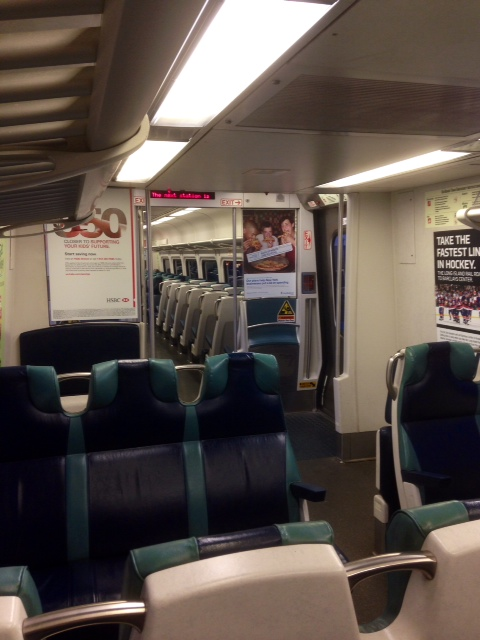
The interior of an M7 car

The LIRR is relatively isolated from the rest of the national rail system despite operating out of Penn Station, the nation's busiest rail terminal. It connects with other railroads in just two locations:

- West of Harold Interlocking in Sunnyside, Queens, LIRR trains enter the Amtrak-operated Northeast Corridor leading to the East River Tunnels. When this track was owned by the Pennsylvania Railroad, trains of the PRR connected to the LIRR at Penn Station. During the 1920s and 1930s a through sleeper was carried by PRR and LIRR trains from Pittsburgh to Montauk, called the 'Sunrise Special'.
- In Glendale, Queens, the LIRR connects with CSX's Fremont Secondary, which leads to the Hell Gate Bridge and New England; however, once trains leave the secondary, they enter LIRR trackage.

All LIRR trains have an engineer (driver in non-US English) who operates the train, a conductor who is responsible for the safe movement of the train, fare collection and on-board customer service, as well as an assistant conductor, commonly referred to as the brakeman. In addition, trains may have one or more assistant conductors to assist with fare collection and other duties. The LIRR is one of the last railroads in the United States to use mechanical interlocking control towers to regulate rail traffic.

As of 2016, the LIRR has 8 active control towers. All movements on the LIRR are under the control of the Movement Bureau in Jamaica, which gives orders to the towers that control a specific portion of the railroad. Movements in Amtrak territory are controlled by Penn Station Control Center or PSCC, run jointly by the LIRR and Amtrak. The PSCC controls as far east as Harold Interlocking, in Sunnyside, Queens. The PSCC replaced several towers.

The Jamaica Control Center, operational since the third quarter of 2010, controls the area around Jamaica terminal by direct control of interlockings. This replaced several towers in Jamaica including Jay and Hall towers at the west and east ends of Jamaica station respectively. At additional locations, line side towers control the various switches and signals in accordance with the timetable and under the direction of the Movement Bureau in Jamaica.

=== Signal and safety systems ===
Today's LIRR signal system has evolved from its legacy Pennsylvania Railroad (PRR)-based system, and the railroad utilizes a variety of wayside railroad signals including position light, color light and dwarf signals. In addition, much of the LIRR is equipped with a bi-directional Pulse code cab signaling called automatic speed control (ASC), though portions of the railway still retain single direction, wayside-only signaling. Unlike other railroads, which began using color-light signals in the 20th century, the LIRR did not begin using signals with color lights on its above-ground sections until 2006.

Some portions of the railway lack automatic signals and cab signals completely, instead train and track car movements are governed only by timetable and verbal/written train orders, although these areas are gradually receiving modern signals. Many other signals and switching systems on the LIRR are being modernized and upgraded as part of the Main Line's Third Track Project, most notably at Mineola, where the system is being completely redone and modernized.

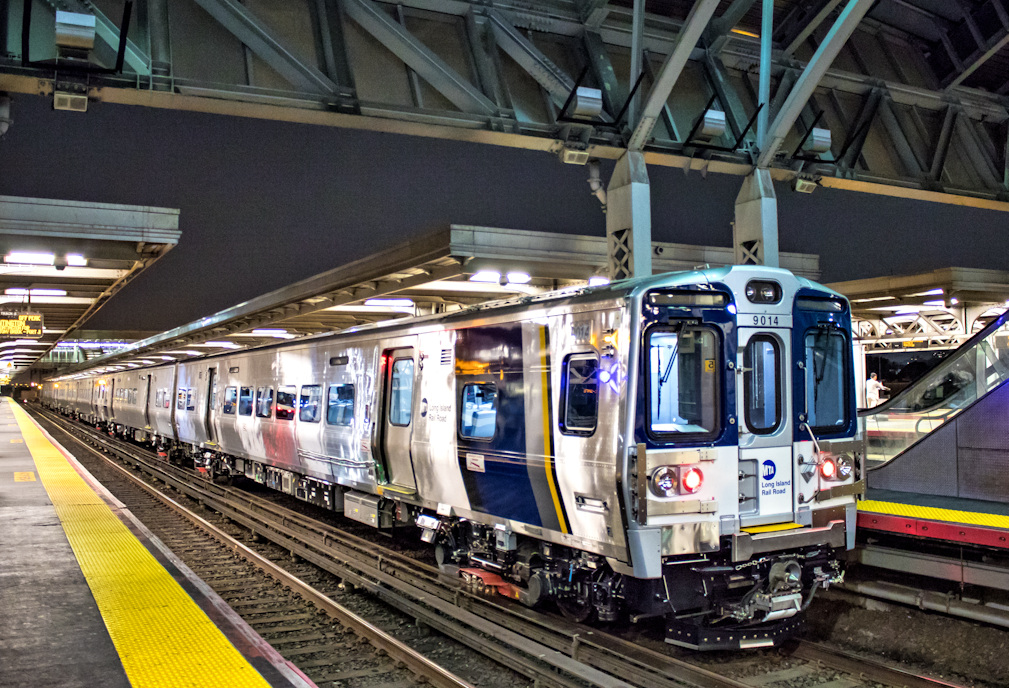
A Long Island Rail Road M9, showing the railcar's dual-type contact shoe

On portions of the railroad equipped with ASC, engineers consult the speed display unit, which is capable of displaying seven speed indications. As a result of a December 1, 2013, train derailment in the Bronx on the Metro-North Railroad, railroads with similar cab signal systems to Metro-North, such as the LIRR, were ordered to modify the systems to enforce certain speed limit changes, which has resulted in lower average speeds and actual speed limits across the LIRR.

=== Power transmission ===
The LIRR's electrified lines are powered via a third rail at 750 volts DC.

== Rolling stock ==
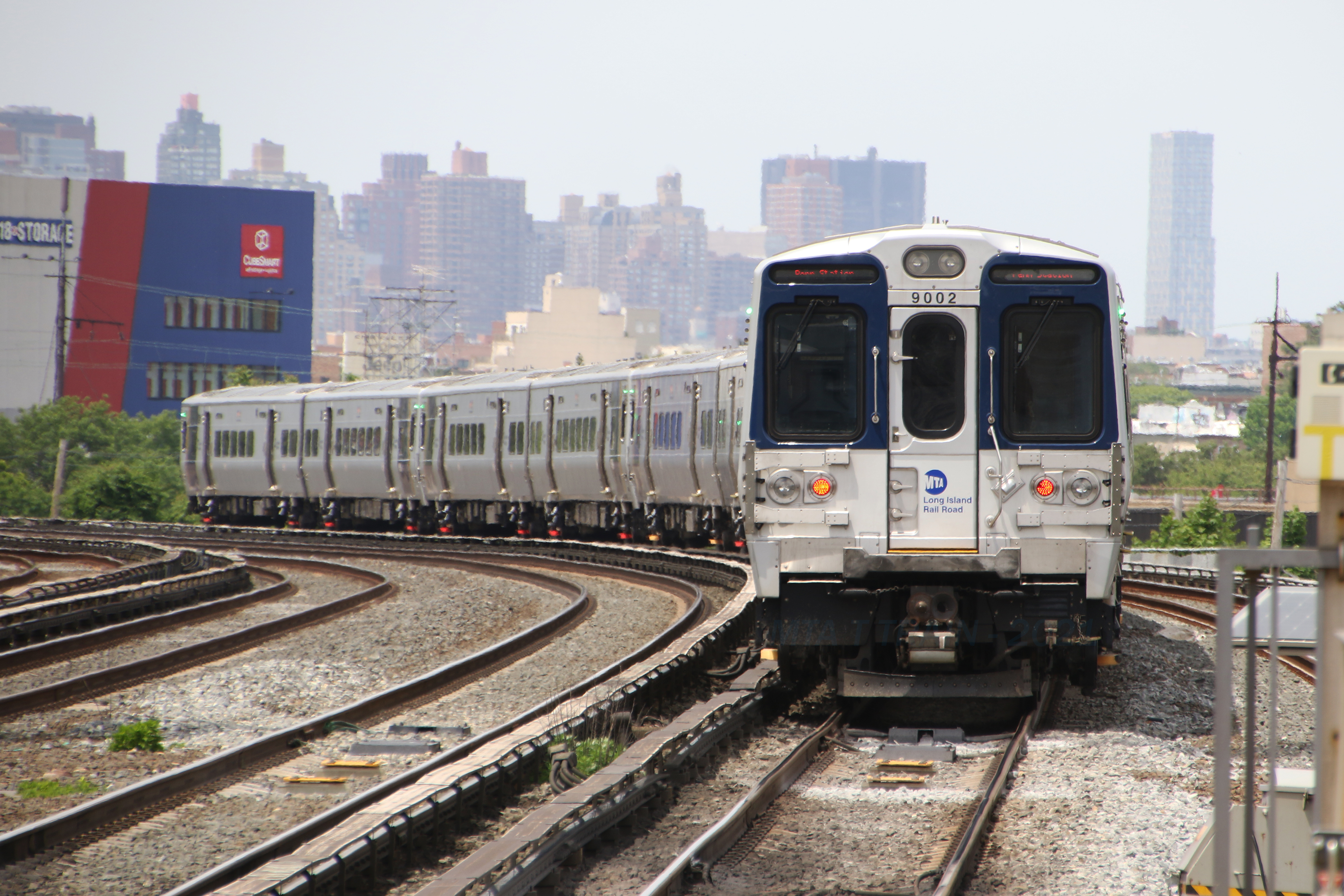
M9 railcars leaving Woodside

=== Electric fleet ===
The LIRR's electric fleet consists of 836 M7, 170 M3, and 202 M9 electric multiple unit cars in married pairs, meaning each car needs the other one to operate, with each car containing its own engineer's cab. The trainsets typically range from 6 to 12 cars long.

In September 2013, MTA announced that the LIRR would procure new M9 railcars from Kawasaki. A 2014 MTA forecast indicated that the LIRR would need 416 M9 railcars; 180 to replace the outdated M3 railcars and an additional 236 railcars for the additional passengers expected once the East Side Access project is complete. The first M9s entered revenue service on September 11, 2019.

On June 23, 2025, the MTA awarded the M9A contract to Alstom. 160 of the 316 cars being built will run on the LIRR.

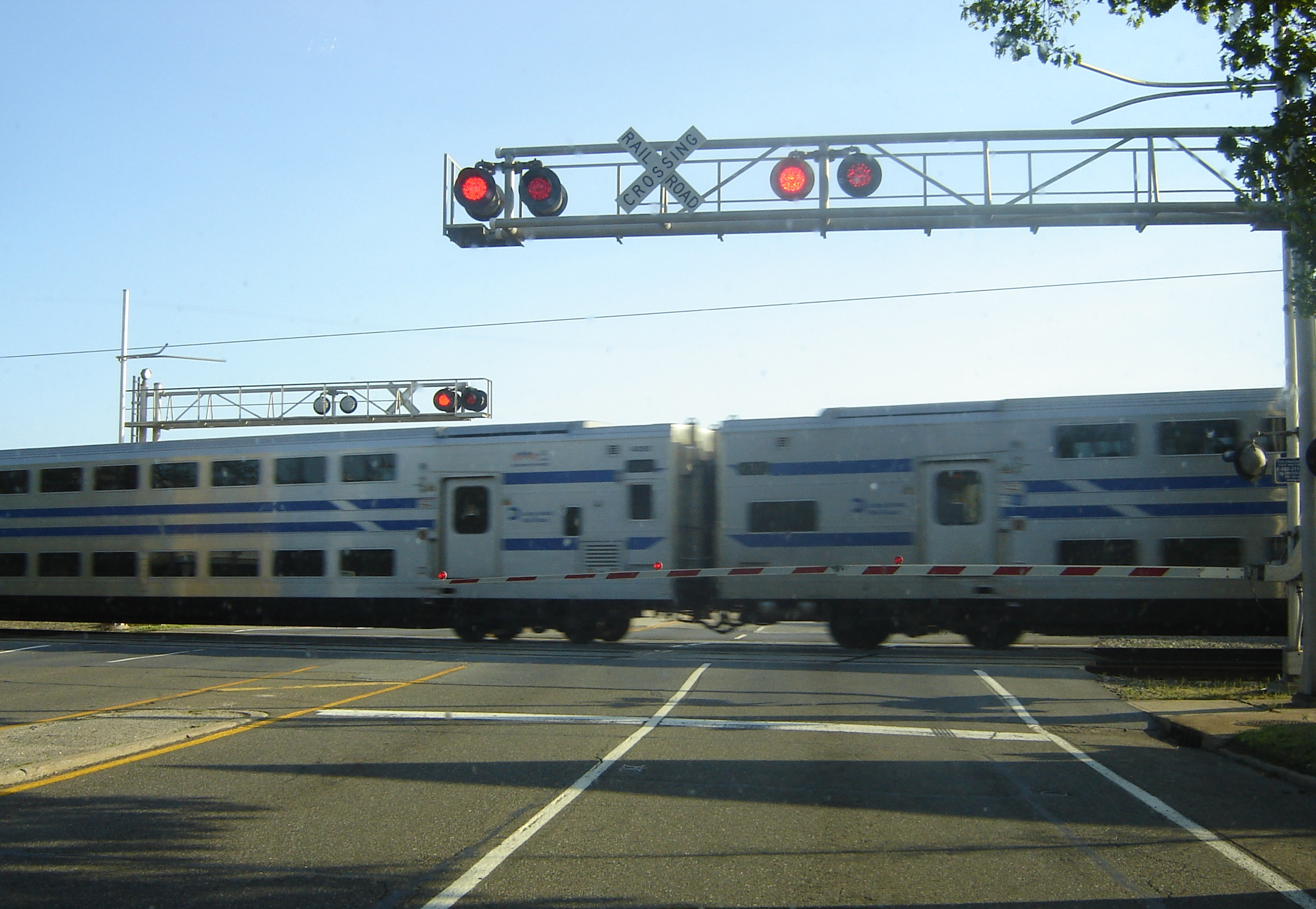
C3 bi-level coaches at a grade crossing in Bethpage

=== Diesel and dual-mode fleets ===
The LIRR also uses 134 C3 bilevel coaches powered by 24 DE30AC diesel-electric locomotives and 20 DM30AC dual-mode locomotives. They are used mostly on non-electrified branches, including the Port Jefferson, Oyster Bay, Montauk, Central, and Greenport Branches. There are also 23 MP15AC locomotives in use as work trains and yard switchers.

== Named trains ==
For most of its history LIRR has served commuters, but it had many named trains, some with all-first class seating, parlor cars, and full bar service. Few of them lasted past World War II, but some names were revived during the 1950s and 1960s, as the railroad expanded its east end parlor car service with luxury coaches and Pullman cars from railroads that were discontinuing their passenger trains.

=== Current ===
- Cannonball – a Friday-only 12-car train to Montauk running May through October, with two all-reserved parlor cars with full bar service. Since May 24, 2013, it has originated at Penn Station with a Sunday evening return from Montauk; only the westward train stops at Jamaica. The name is a nod to the Cannon Ball, the all-year train to Montauk that had operated since 1899. It carried parlor cars and standard-fare coaches and ran weekday afternoons from Long Island City, then from Penn Station until 1951, when DD1 operation – and changing engines at Jamaica – ceased.

=== Former ===
- Fisherman's Special (1932–1950s) – operated from Long Island City to Canoe Place Station and Montauk via Jamaica, April through October, terminating at Canoe Place in April, extended to Montauk in May. Served Long Island's fishing trade.
- Peconic Bay Express / Shinnecock Bay Express (1926–1950) – operated from Long Island City to Greenport and Montauk; Saturday only, express to Greenport and Montauk. Discontinued during World War II though revived for a few seasons afterwards.
- Shelter Island Express (1901–1903; 1923–1942) – operated from Long Island City to Greenport; Friday-only summer express that connected to Shelter Island ferries.
- Sunrise Special (1922–1942) – ran during the summer, from NY Penn to Montauk on Fridays and thence westbound on Mondays. In summer 1926, it ran daily. All parlor car (no coaches) from 1932 to 1937.
- Grand Central Direct (2023) – operated as a temporary shuttle service between Jamaica and Grand Central Madison, providing service to and from the new terminal. Operations began on January 25, 2023 – the terminal's opening date – and ceased upon the commencement of regular service the following month.

== Freight service ==
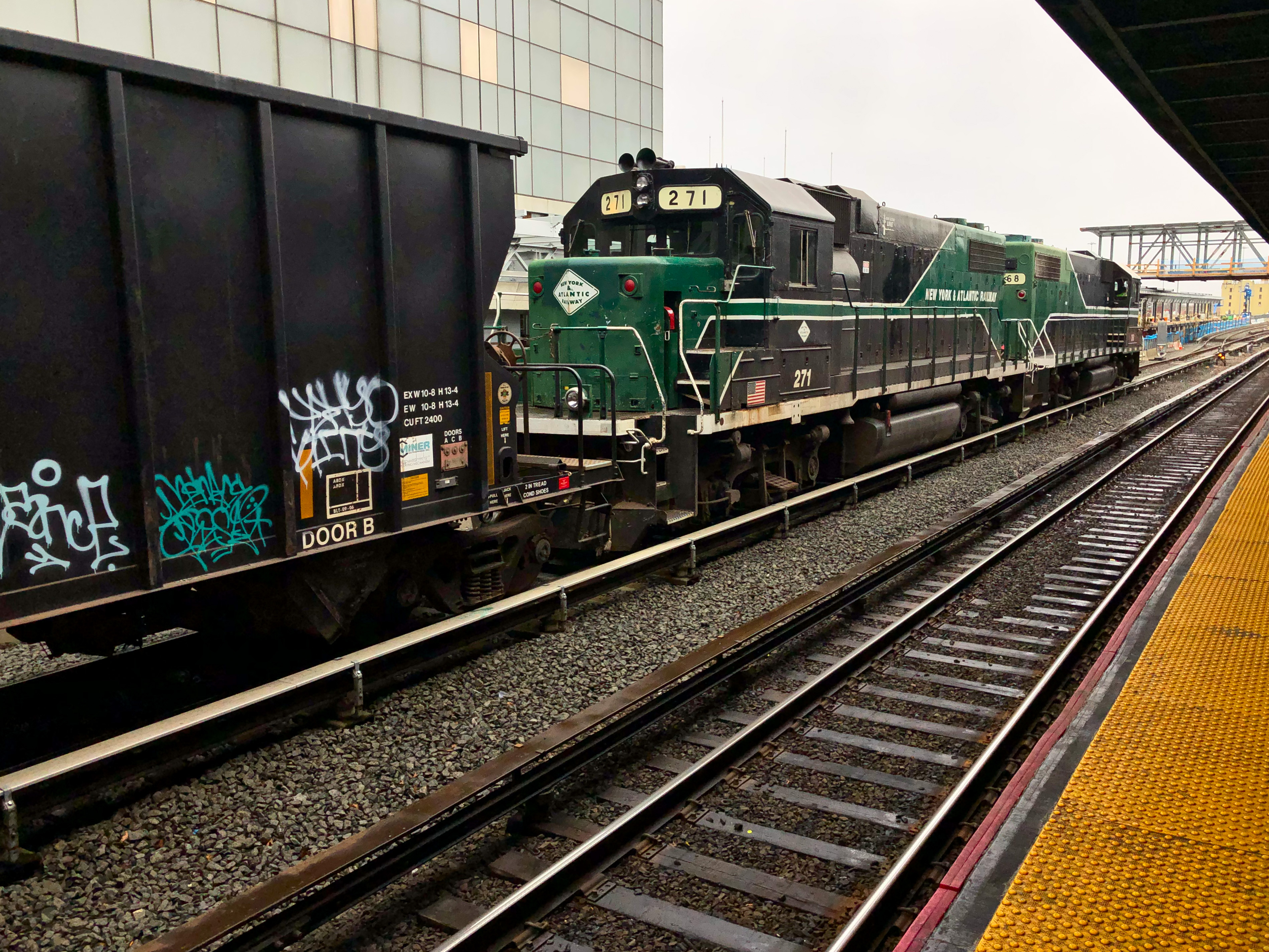
A NYAR freight train at Jamaica station

The LIRR and other railroads that became part of the system have always had freight service, though this has diminished. The process of shedding freight service accelerated with the acquisition of the railroad by New York State. In the 21st century, there has been some appreciation of the need for better railroad freight service in New York City and on Long Island. Both areas are primarily served by trucking for freight haulage – an irony in a region with the most extensive rail transit service in the Americas, as well as the worst traffic conditions.

Proposals for a Cross-Harbor Rail Tunnel for freight have existed for years to alleviate these issues, and, in recent years, there have been many new pushes for its construction by officials. Financial issues, as well as bureaucracy, remain major hurdles in constructing it. In May 1997, freight service was franchised on a 20-year term to the New York and Atlantic Railway (NYAR), a short line railroad owned by the Anacostia and Pacific Company.

It has its own equipment and crews, but uses the rail facilities of the LIRR. To the east, freight service operates to the end of the West Hempstead Branch, to Huntington on the Port Jefferson Branch, to Bridgehampton on the Montauk Branch, and to Riverhead on the Main Line. On the western end it provides service on the surviving freight-only tracks of the LIRR: the Bay Ridge and Bushwick branches; the "Lower Montauk" between Jamaica and Long Island City; and to an interchange connection at Fresh Pond Junction in Queens with the CSX, Canadian Pacific Kansas City, and Providence and Worcester railroads.

=== Freight branches ===
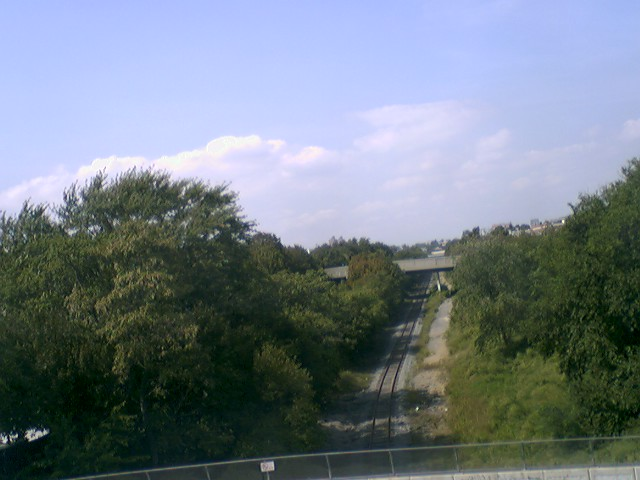
The freight-only Bay Ridge Branch through Brooklyn

Some non-electrified lines are used only for freight:

- The Garden City–Mitchel Field Secondary is a short remnant of the Central Branch that splits from the Hempstead Branch at Garden City, running to Uniondale near Hofstra University and Nassau Veterans Memorial Coliseum. This branch does not host any NYAR service. This branch was used by the Ringling Bros. Circus to transport animals, staff and equipment to the Nassau Coliseum until their final shows there in May 2017.
- The Bushwick Branch runs west from the Montauk Branch at Maspeth to Bushwick Terminal. This was a passenger branch until 1924.
- The Bay Ridge Branch runs south and west from the Montauk Branch at Fresh Pond to Bay Ridge. At Fresh Pond, it meets CSX's Fremont Secondary, which goes over the Hell Gate Bridge towards Upstate New York and New England. At its southern end it interchanges with the New York New Jersey Rail cross-harbor rail-barge service to New Jersey. This branch had a passenger service until 1924. The entire line was electrified with overhead wire in 1927, and the overhead wires were dismantled in 1969.

== Planned service expansions ==
=== Electrification projects ===
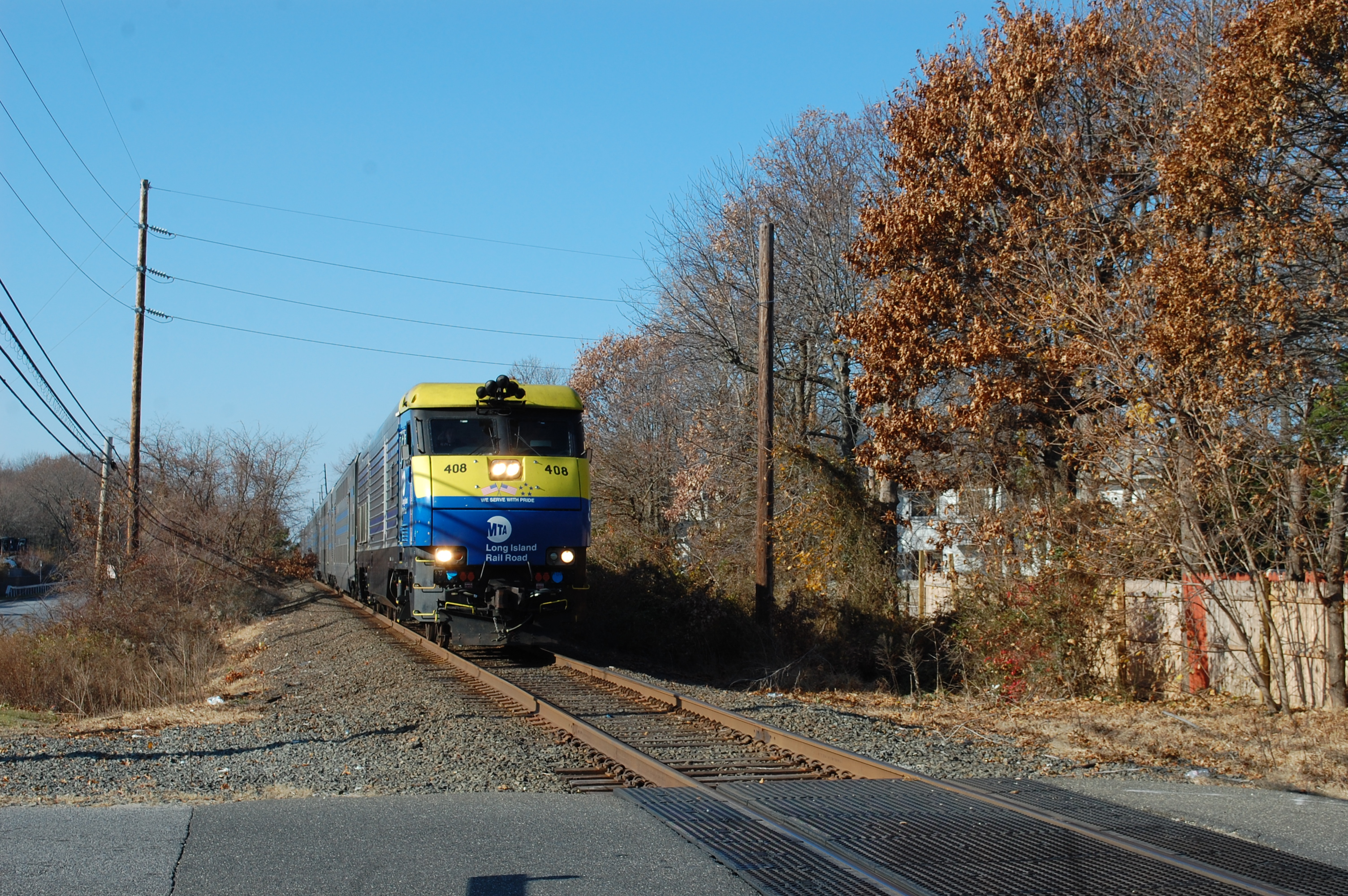
A diesel train running along the Central Branch in 2012

As part of the 2020–2024 MTA Capital Program, the MTA proposed electrifying the LIRR's Central Branch, which would allow for enhanced service options and capacity, and to mitigate service disruptions, should one arise. Although funding was initially allocated through the 2020–2024 MTA Capital Program, the project was ultimately put on hold.

There have also been many pushes by residents and politicians over the past several decades – most recently by former New York State Senator Jim Gaughran – to electrify the remainder of the Port Jefferson Branch between the Huntington and Port Jefferson stations, in addition to the remainder of the Oyster Bay Branch between the East Williston and Oyster Bay, to enhance service in the served areas and to upgrade service capacities along the lines; electrifying these lines could lead to more frequent direct service to and from Manhattan, as diesel trains are not allowed in Penn Station and dual-mode trains exceed the height clearance for the 63rd Street Tunnel into Grand Central Madison.

== Law enforcement ==
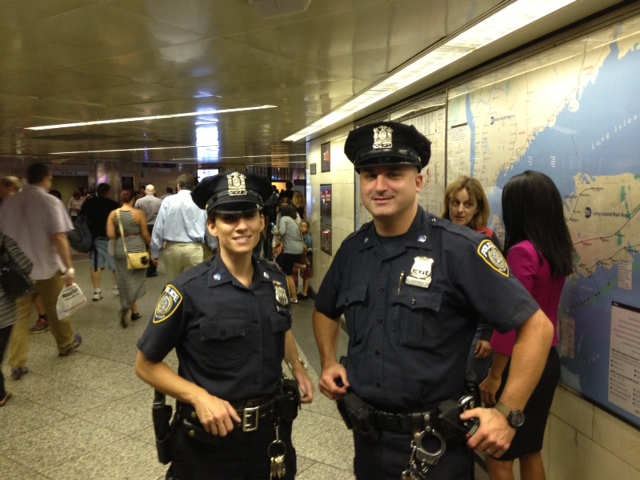
Two officers for the MTA Police in Penn Station

The Long Island Rail Road Police Department, founded in 1868, was absorbed along with the Metro-North Railroad Police Department to form the Metropolitan Transportation Authority Police Department (MTA Police) in 1998.

== Criticism and controversy ==
=== Passenger issues ===
The LIRR has a long history of tense relations with its passengers. Daily commuters have long had complaints about the LIRR's service. According to a 1999 article in The New York Times, the LIRR's service woes were long considered part of the "unholy trinity of life on Long Island," along with the Long Island Lighting Company's high rates and the Long Island Expressway's traffic snarls. Various commuter advocacy groups have been formed to try to represent those interests, in addition to the state mandated LIRR Commuters Council.

The LIRR has been criticized for not providing additional service to the East End of Long Island as the twin forks continue to grow in popularity as a year-round tourist and residential destination. Demand is evidenced by flourishing for-profit bus services such as the Hampton Jitney and the Hampton Luxury Liner and the early formative stages of a new East End Transportation Authority. Local politicians have joined the public outcry for the LIRR to either improve the frequency of east end services, or turn the operation over to a local transportation authority.

Critics claim that the on-time performance (OTP) calculated by the LIRR is manipulated to be artificially high. Because the LIRR does not release any raw timing data nor does it have independent (non-MTA) audits it is impossible to verify this claim, or the accuracy of the current On Time Performance measurement. The percentage measure is used by many other US passenger railroads but the criticism over accuracy is specific to the LIRR. As defined by the LIRR, a train is "on time" if it arrives at a station within 5 minutes and 59 seconds of the scheduled time. The criterion was 4 minutes and 59 seconds until the LIRR changed it because of a bug in their computer systems.

Critics believe the OTP measure does not reflect what commuters experience on a daily basis. The LIRR publishes the current OTP in a monthly booklet called TrainTalk. TrainTalk was previously known as "Keeping Track." A more accurate way to measure delays and OTP has been proposed. Called the "Passenger Hours Delayed" index, it can measure the total person-hours of a specific delay. This would be useful in comparing the performance of specific days or incidents, day-to-day (or week-to-week) periods, but has not been adopted.

Ridership has increased from 81 million passengers in 2011 to 89.3 million passengers in 2016, which is the railroad's highest ridership since 1949. The all-time highest ridership was in 1929, when 119 million passengers rode 1.89 billion passenger miles. This increase in ridership has been attributed to the increased usage of the LIRR by millennials, and the increase of reverse-peak travel.

=== Pension and disability fraud scandal ===
A New York Times investigation in 2008 showed that 25% of LIRR employees who had retired since 2000 filed for disability payments from the federal Railroad Retirement Board and 97% of them were approved to receive disability pension. The total collected was more than $250,000,000 over eight years. As a result, Railroad Retirement agents from Chicago inspected the Long Island office of the Railroad Retirement Board on September 23, 2008. New York Governor David Paterson issued a statement calling for Congress to conduct a full review of the board's mission and daily activities. Officials at the board's headquarters responded to the investigation stating that all occupational disability annuities were issued in accordance with applicable laws.

On November 17, 2008, a former LIRR pension manager was arrested and charged with official misconduct for performing outside work without permission. However, these charges were all dismissed for "no merit" by Supreme Court Judge Kase on December 11, 2009, on the grounds that the prosecution had misled the grand jury in the indictment.

A report produced in September 2009 by the Government Accountability Office stated that the rate at which retirees were rewarded disability claims was above the norm for the industry in general and indicated "troubling" practices that may indicate fraud, such as the use of a very small group of physicians in making diagnoses.

Another series of arrests on October 27, 2011, included two doctors and a former union official.

According to court documents, from 1998 through 2011, 79% of LIRR retirees obtained federal disability when they retired. On August 6, 2013, a doctor and two consultants were found guilty in connection with the accusations and sentenced to prison.

=== Overtime fraud scandals ===
In 2018, LIRR foreman Raymond Murphy was discovered at or near his home on 10 occasions whilst claiming overtime pay. Murphy earned $405,021 in 2017, of which $295,490 was overtime. According to reports, he was allowed to retire with a full public pension before being reprimanded or punished.

In 2021, LIRR employee and track inspector Thomas Caputo and co-conspirators John Nugent and Joseph Balestra were federally convicted for large-scale overtime fraud. Caputo was paid approximately $461,000 in 2018, of which $344,000 was supposed overtime. He claimed to have worked 3,864 overtime hours, an average of more than 10 hours of overtime for all 365 days the year. Phone, bank, email, and other records revealed many of these hours were fraudulent: Caputo was clocked in during vacation and while attending outside social events such as a bowling league.

== Accidents and incidents ==
- On August 26, 1893, two trains collided in Maspeth, Queens, killing 16 people and injuring over 40.
- On August 13, 1926, the Shelter Island Express derailed on a switch in Calverton, Suffolk County, and crashed into the Golden Pickle Works factory. The crash claimed six lives and injured 15.
- On August 3, 1946, a head-on train crash occurred at the Port Washington station in Port Washington. The collision resulted in two deaths and 27 injuries.
- On February 17, 1950, two trains collided head-on after an engineer on train 192 ignored an approach signal and the following red signals at Rockville Centre station, leaving 32 dead and more than 100 injured. At the time, it was the worst rail disaster in LIRR history.
- On November 22, 1950, two trains collided after one of the trains passed a red signal in Kew Gardens, killing 78 and injuring 363 – the LIRR's worst rail disaster to ever occur.
- On March 14, 1982, a train hit a van at a level crossing on Herricks Road in Mineola after the driver of the van went around the gate. The nine deaths and one injury were all occupants of the van.
- On December 7, 1993, a mass shooting occurred onboard a train at Merillon Avenue station in Garden City Park. Six people were killed and nineteen others were wounded.
- On October 23, 2000, the lead locomotive (DM30AC #503) of a dual-mode commuter train caught fire west of Huntington station. The fire was blamed on a defective shoe beam that caused a 750-volt short circuit with the locomotive's third rail contact shoe. The train was evacuated and nobody was injured, though locomotive #503 was irreparably damaged. This incident was the most severe out of several electrical fires involving the then-new DM30AC locomotives, which prompted a full-scale investigation into their reliability and safety. The entire fleet—two locomotives at a time—would be sent to General Motors for repairs beginning in fall 2001.
- On May 17, 2011, a commuter train in Deer Park collided a baked goods truck that attempted to drive around the crossing gate at a level crossing. The truck driver was killed and two train passengers were injured.
- On October 8, 2016, a commuter LIRR train side-swiped a maintenance train east of New Hyde Park station. The commuter train cars suffered damage and 33 passengers were injured – four of them seriously.
- On January 4, 2017, a Long Island Rail Road commuter train derailed at Atlantic Terminal in Brooklyn. At least 103 people were injured.
- On February 26, 2019, two Long Island Rail Road trains hit a pickup truck at the School Street railroad crossing in Westbury on the LIRR Main Line, causing the driver and two passengers to be ejected from the vehicle resulting in their deaths, numerous injuries, and damage to the nearby LIRR station platform.
- On May 25, 2019, a commuter train sideswiped a non-revenue train at the siding east of Speonk station and derailed. The non-revenue train was 14 cars long, whereas the siding could only fit 13 cars. Nobody was injured, though it took two days to restore normal service, and the derailed train's front locomotive (DM30AC #511) was damaged beyond repair. The incident was blamed on a track circuit failure; an MTA worker, who resigned following the accident, was later charged and indicted for falsifying an inspection report of the would-be point of failure.
- On August 3, 2023, a Long Island Rail Road commuter train derailed east of Jamaica station; 13 people were injured.
- On April 17, 2025, a Long Island Rail Road commuter train collided with a vehicle west of Pinelawn station. The driver of the car was killed and the first car of the train was damaged.

== See also ==
- List of presidents and trustees of the Long Island Rail Road
- History of the Long Island Rail Road
- List of Long Island Rail Road Stations
- Long Island Rail Road Demonstration Farm
- Long Island Rail Road rolling stock
- Palsgraf v. Long Island Rail Road Co.
- 1993 Long Island Rail Road shooting
