= Moriches =

Moriches may refer to:

- Moriches, New York
- Moriches Bay, Long Island, New York
- Moriches Inlet, Long Island, New York
- Moriches (LIRR Sag Harbor station), the original name of the Eastport station on the Long Island Rail Road, New York
- Moriches (Brooklyn and Montauk Railroad station), the original name of the Center Moriches station on the Long Island Rail Road, New York

== See also ==
- Center Moriches, New York
- East Moriches, New York
- Moriche (Mauritia flexuosa), a palm tree
- Moraches, Nièvre, France
