= Speonk station =

Long Island Rail Road station in Suffolk County, New York

Speonk
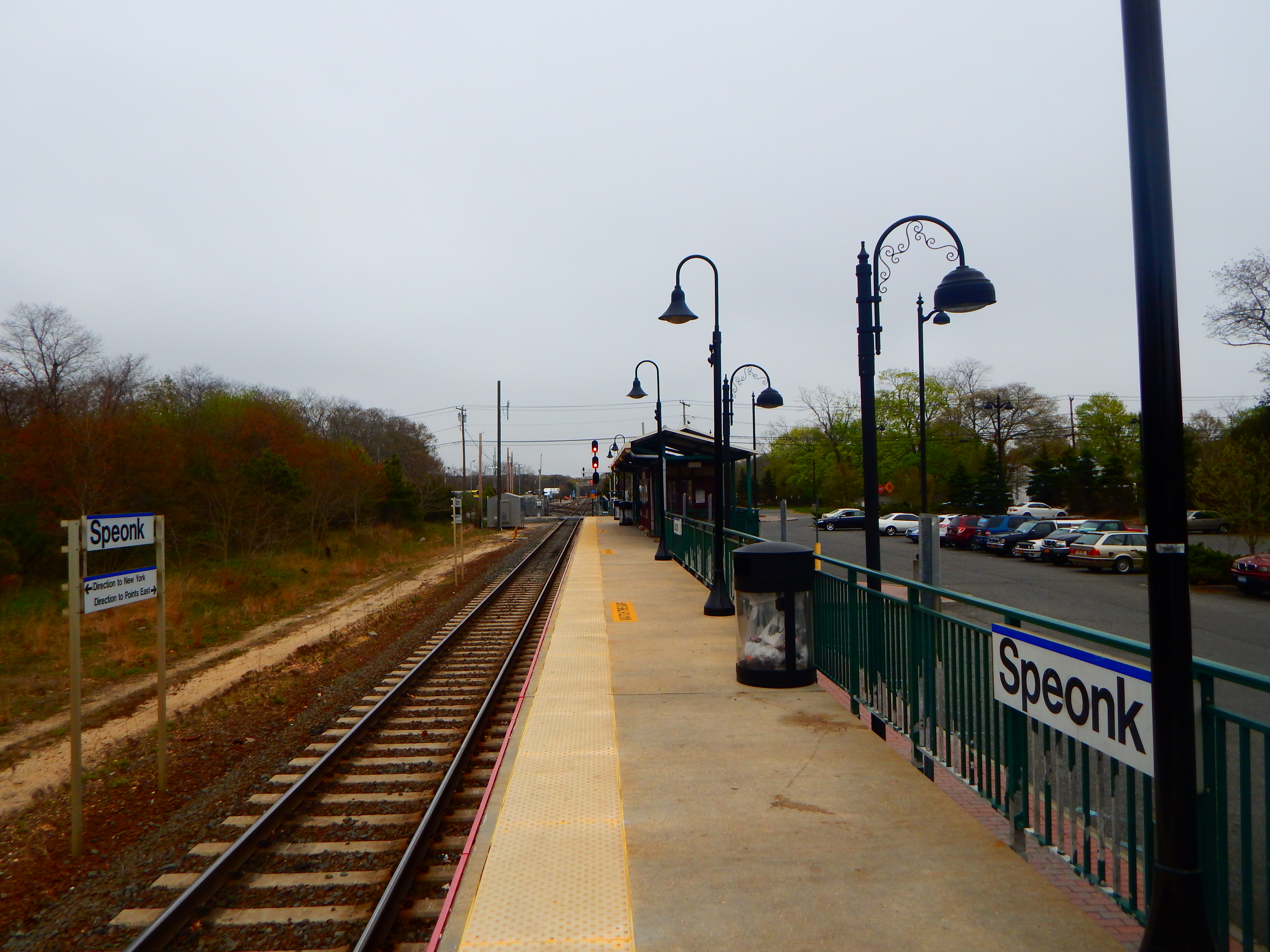
- The Speonk station in May 2015

General information
- Location: Phillips Avenue & Depot Road; Speonk, New York
- Coordinates: 40.821224°N 72.704853°W
- Owner: Long Island Rail Road
- Platforms: 1 side platform
- Tracks: 1

Construction
- Parking: Yes (free)
- Cycle facilities: Yes
- Accessible: Yes

Other information
- Station code: SPK
- Fare zone: 12

History
- Opened: 1870
- Rebuilt: 1901, 1958, 2001
- Former names: Remsenburg (1895–1897)

Passengers
- 2012–2014: 180 per weekday
- Rank: 108 of 125

Services
Preceding station	Long Island Rail Road	Following station
Mastic–Shirley toward Penn Station or Long Island City	Montauk Branch limited service	Westhampton toward Montauk
Former services
Preceding station	Long Island Rail Road	Following station
Eastport toward Long Island City	Montauk Division	Westhampton toward Montauk
Eastport toward Manorville	Sag Harbor Branch	Westhampton toward Sag Harbor
Location

Speonk is an unstaffed railroad station on the Montauk Branch of the Long Island Rail Road. It is located on Phillips Avenue at Depot Road in Speonk, New York, just north of Montauk Highway (CR 80). The station has two parking lots, one operated by the Long Island Rail Road, and the other operated by the Town of Southampton, both of which are free. It also lies adjacent to one of the largest railroad yards on Long Island's East End. This yard is mostly used to hold passenger consists, as a handful of trains terminate at Speonk rather than continue all the way to Montauk.

== History ==
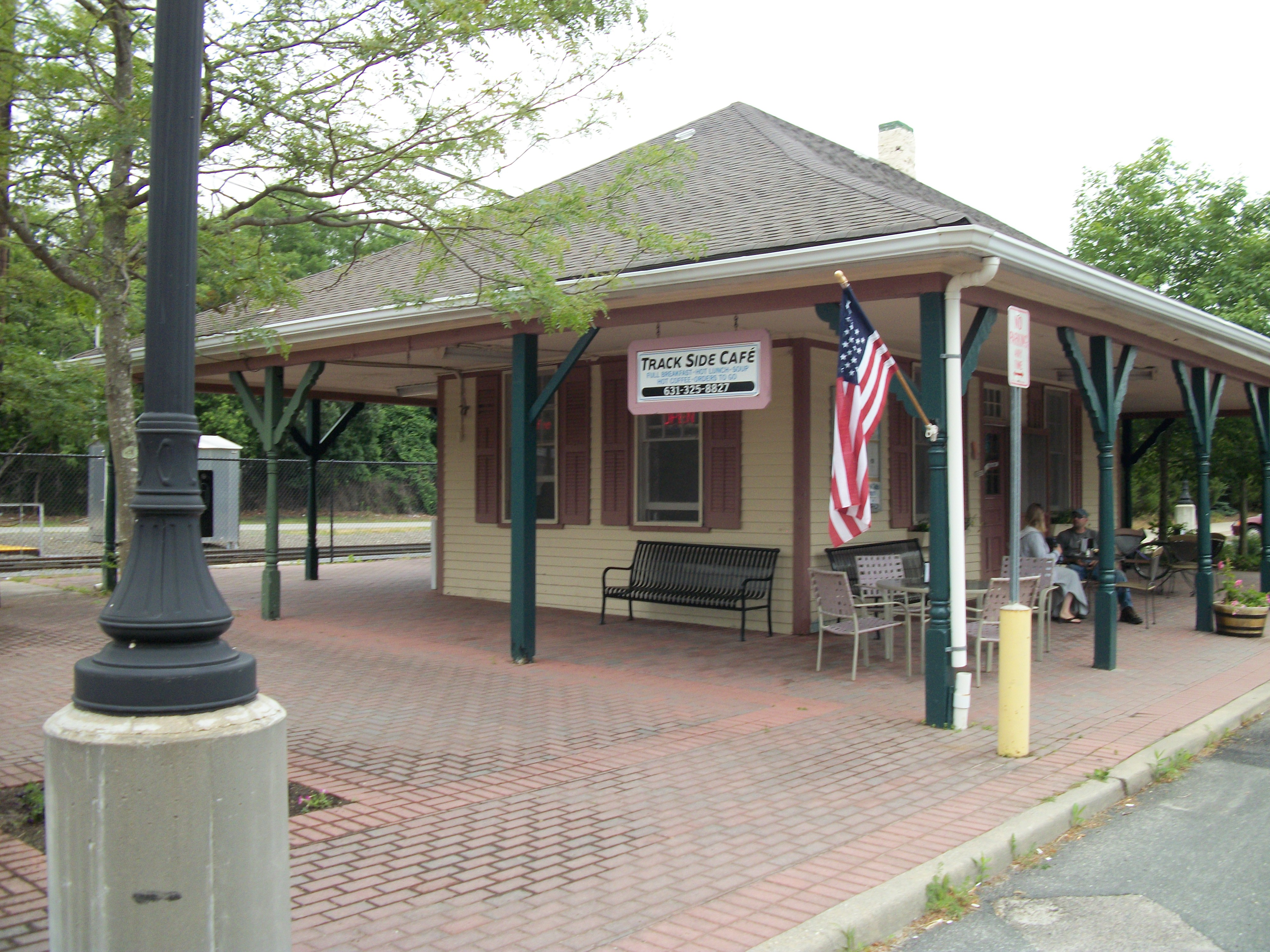
The Speonk Trackside Café, which operated out of the former station house until ~2020. It is now home to Little Gull Café.

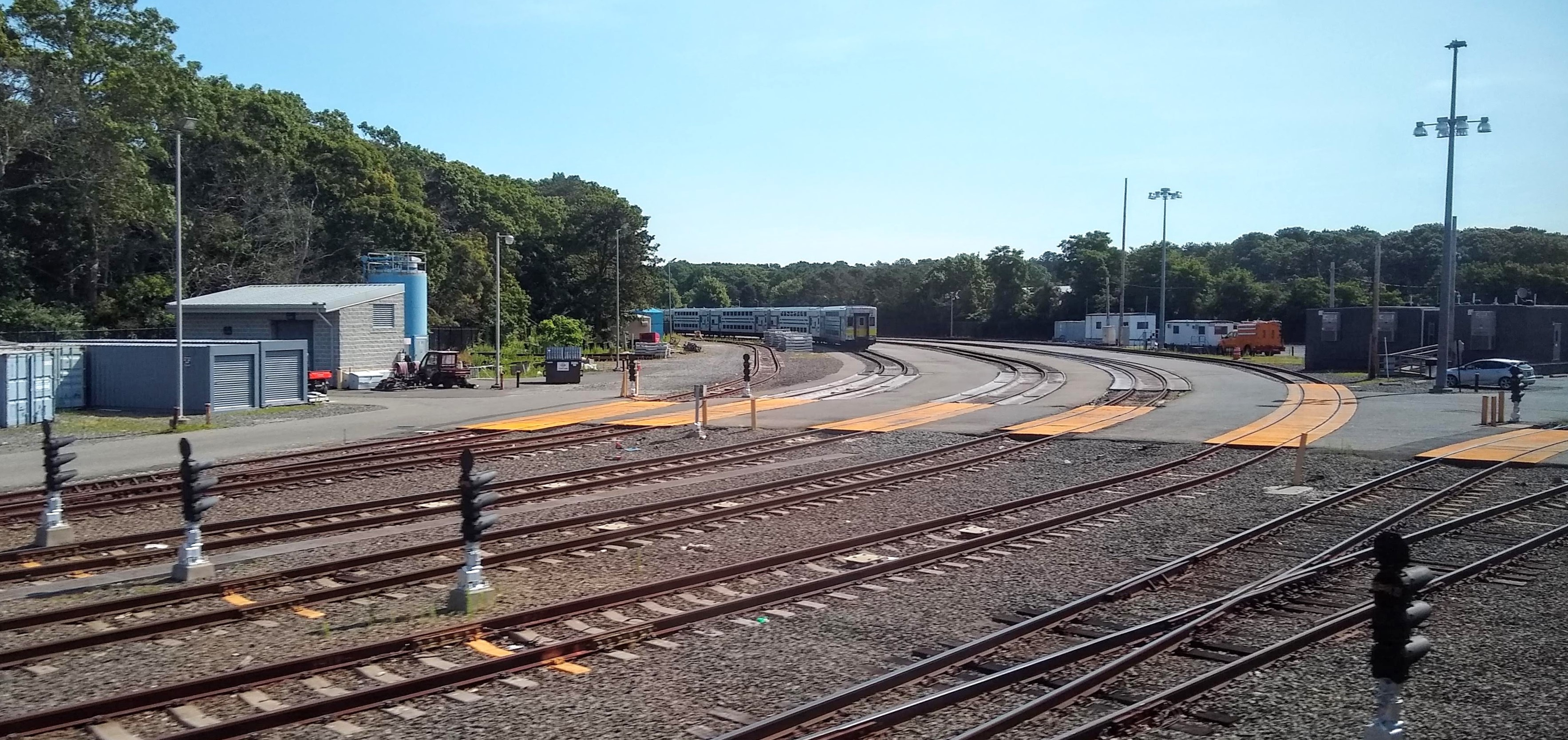
Speonk Yard, just east of the station

Speonk station was originally built in February 1870 along what was then the Sag Harbor Branch. From 1895 to 1897 it was known as "Remsenburg Station", acknowledging the hamlet of Remsenburg, New York, which lies just south of Speonk. The station was struck by lightning and burned on June 22, 1901, and a second depot opened in December 1901. Railroad conductors frequently accentuated the name when calling it out as the next station. This latter agency and depot were closed in 1958, and the station has been unstaffed ever since. The former station was converted into a snack bar that is still operating as Little Gull Café.

When Eastport and East Moriches stations were closed by the LIRR on October 6, 1958, due to lack of usage, commuters were told to transfer either to this station or to Center Moriches station. The elimination of the latter on March 16, 1998, makes Speonk the next choice for commuters east of Mastic–Shirley station, almost ten miles away by road. The traffic from all three intervening stations which have been eliminated since 1950 has been transferred to these two stations.

As part of its program to upgrade all stations to high-level platforms, the LIRR relocated the functional portion of Speonk station between 1996 and 1997. A new platform was built on the west side of North Phillips Avenue, along with a new parking lot; the aforementioned station house and former low-level platform were located to the east. The new platform includes an outdoor enclosure, but no new station building was constructed. The new station includes ticket vending machines and elegant lighting in the parking lots. The former station house and current cafe is across the tracks from the yard.

The yard east of the station features a wye to turn locomotives around.

== Station layout ==
The station has one four-car-long high-level platform on the south side of the single track. There are two large parking lots nearby.
