= East Moriches station =

Former train station in New York, US

East Moriches
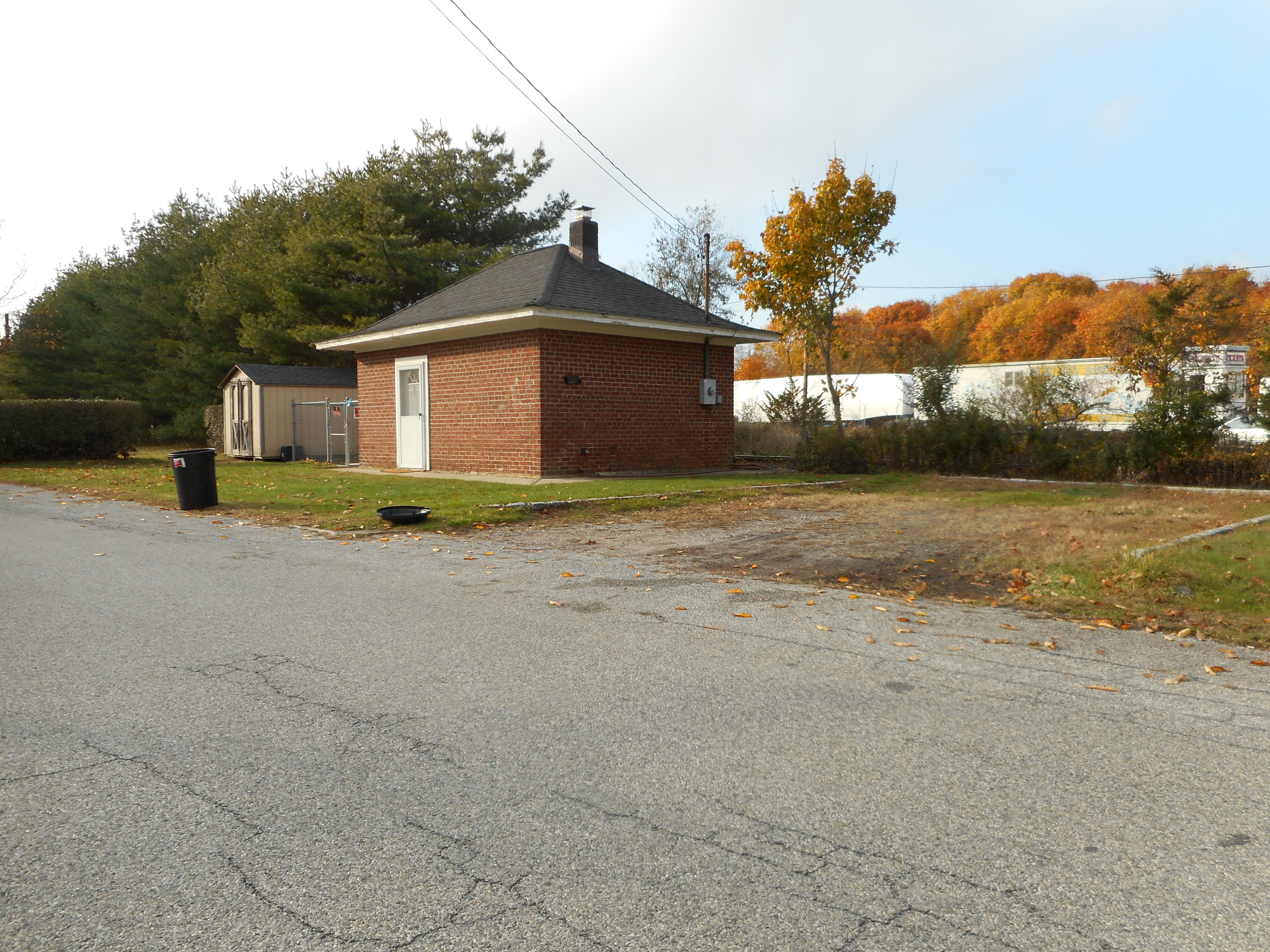
- The former East Moriches LIRR station, currently a private home.

General information
- Location: Pine Street and Railroad Avenue; East Moriches, New York
- Coordinates: 40.810244°N 72.76317°W
- Owner: Long Island Rail Road

History
- Opened: May 29, 1897
- Closed: October 6, 1958

Former services
Preceding station	Long Island Rail Road	Following station
Center Moriches toward Long Island City	Montauk Division	Eastport toward Montauk
Location

East Moriches is a former railroad station on the Montauk Branch of the Long Island Rail Road. It was located near Pine Street and Railroad Avenue in East Moriches, New York.

== History ==
East Moriches station was originally built in 1897, and throughout much of its history has existed as a flag stop which has served more freight than passengers. The station agency closed in 1932, and burned on September 22, 1936. A second depot was built at some point as a brick structure, but continued to operate primarily as a freight station and a flag stop, as the original depot did. Despite efforts to keep this station open, as well as Brookhaven and Eastport stations, the New York State Public Service Commission gave the Long Island Rail Road permission to close them all on October 6, 1958. Commuters were advised by the Long Island Rail Road to use Center Moriches station instead. As of 2006, the former station still remains standing as a private residence. The Center Moriches station was closed in 1998, and had been only a sheltered platform in its last 13 years of existence.
