= History of the Long Island Rail Road =

Map of the constructors of the Long Island Rail Road and its predecessors

The Long Island Rail Road is a railroad owned by the Metropolitan Transportation Authority in the U.S. state of New York. It is the oldest United States railroad still operating under its original name and charter. It consolidated several other companies in the late 19th century. The Pennsylvania Railroad owned the Long Island Rail Road for the majority of the 20th century and sold it to the State in 1966.

== Gateway to Boston, 1832–1840s ==
The LIRR's history stretches back to the Brooklyn and Jamaica Rail Road, incorporated on April 25, 1832 to build a ten-mile line from the East River in Brooklyn through the communities of Brooklyn, Bedford, and East New York to Jamaica. B&J engineer Major D. B. Douglass soon began planning for a continuation, forming part of an 11-hour combination rail and steamship route between New York City and Boston in cooperation with the New York, Providence and Boston Railroad and Boston and Providence Rail Road. The current all-land route (Shore Line) across southern Connecticut was considered impassable at the time due to numerous hills and river valleys. Douglass attracted wealthy New Yorkers and Bostonians, who received a charter for the Long-Island Rail-Road Company on April 24, 1834, with the right "to construct, and during its existence to maintain and continue a rail-road or rail-roads, with a single or double track, and with such appendages as may be deemed necessary for the convenient use of the same, commencing at any eligible point adjoining Southold Bay, in or near the village of Greenport, in the county of Suffolk, and extending from thence, on the most practicable route, through or near the middle of Long-Island, to a point on the water's edge in the village of Brooklyn, in the county of Kings, to be designated by the trustees of that village, and to a point on the water's edge in the village of Williamsburgh, in the said county of Kings, to be designated by the trustees of that village, and in like manner to construct, maintain and continue a branch rail-road from the said main road to Sag Harbor". It was also authorized to unite with the Brooklyn and Jamaica with the consent of that company.

Since its plan was not to serve local traffic on Long Island, the LIRR chose not to serve existing communities along the shores of the island, but built straight down the middle of the island, which was largely uninhabited at the time and relatively free of grade crossings. This straight route was the quickest and the easiest to build, compared to the options of building along the northern coast of Long Island, or in a north-central route following the Middle Country Road. The LIRR was organized on June 17, 1835, and Knowles Taylor was elected president.

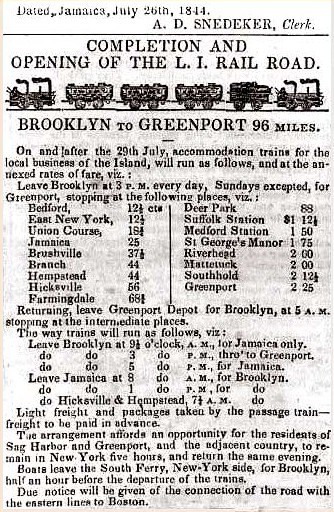
Schedule for the first day of revenue operation to Greenport, July 29, 1844

After one or more trial runs in February 1836, the Brooklyn and Jamaica opened its full line, roughly along the present Atlantic Avenue from South Ferry to 151st Street in Jamaica, on April 18, 1836. The B&J never operated its own trains, since that same day it was leased to the LIRR for $33,300 a year, a rather high amount for the time based on expected heavy traffic to Boston. Even before the B&J opened, the LIRR began planning a branch to the Grand Street Ferry in Williamsburg, leaving the B&J at Bedford, to avoid congestion in Brooklyn. The LIRR started to build the B&J's continuation beyond Jamaica immediately upon completion of the Brooklyn-Jamaica line, opening to Hicksville on March 1, 1837.

Hicksville remained the terminal for the next four years due to the financial panic of 1837. The entire line was a single track, but the roadbed was graded for two tracks with a width of 28 feet. According to a February 24, 1837 announcement, a station called Westbury Hempstead was added. By June, the station was renamed Carle Place. At this location, passengers for Westbury and Hempstead would transfer to stagecoaches. As early as March 1837 a stop at the Union Course Race Track is listed, and as late as June 1837 the station is listed on timetables as Wyckoff's Lane. The September 8, 1837 timetable shows Pennsylvania Avenue and Connecticut Avenue (later Woodhaven Boulevard) as stations instead of Union Course. Because steam trains were not allowed in the City of Brooklyn, from 1836 to 1839, trains were pulled by horses between Brooklyn and Bedford. Also along the way to Hicksville, a station was added at Willow Tree.

On May 16, 1836, a supplement to the charter authorized a branch to Hempstead, and surveying was done for the branch in 1838. The short Hempstead Branch, running south from the Main Line at Mineola, opened in July 1839 from Hempstead Branch station (later Mineola) down Main Street, terminating between Fulton Street and Centre Street. The branch was served using a small dummy train, shuttling passengers on the branch. The LIRR slowly extended east, reaching Farmingdale on October 18, 1841, and reaching Deer Park in 1842, which was the stopping place for the shore villages of Huntington and Babylon, even though they were miles away.

Later in 1842, the line reached Suffolk station, and in 1844, it reached Medford and Millville. After this point, the building of the line was split into two sections, one from Greenport and one from Millville, both meeting up at St. George's Manor. These were the most difficult sections to complete, but the Main Line was completed, and service began on July 27, 1844. An opening excursion to Greenport was operated on July 27, 1844, making the trip in three and a half hours, and revenue service began over the full line on July 29. Because the route bypassed the communities on the north and south shores, people from these areas had to drive six or more miles in a stagecoach to get to the line.

The LIRR bought the steamboat Cleopatra from Cornelius Vanderbilt, then known for his ferry empire, to cover the Long Island Sound crossing, and began operating to Stonington, Connecticut on August 10. Vanderbilt was elected to the LIRR board of directors on November 26. The opening of the Cobble Hill Tunnel along the Brooklyn and Jamaica west of downtown Brooklyn on December 3, 1844, decreased the grade to the waterfront and allowed locomotives to run through to South Ferry, eliminating a horse car transfer.

The LIRR began operating the Worcester and New Haven steamboats in 1845, and established a second route to Boston via steamboat to Allyn's Point and the Norwich and Worcester Railroad and Boston and Worcester Railroad. But competition from the Hartford and New Haven Railroad (completed 1844) and steamboats from New York caused the LIRR to sell the Worcester and Cleopatra to the N&W in July 1846, and the early 1847 completion of the Fall River Line cut into profits enough that the New Haven was sold to Jacob Vanderbilt, ending Boston express service.

== Local focus, 1840s–1875 ==
The final blow came in December 1848, when the New York and New Haven Railroad opened through the "impassable" country of southern Connecticut, forming part of an overland route via New Haven and Springfield. With only one short branch, the LIRR was not built to serve local Long Island traffic, and it was decades before it had fully adjusted to its new role. In part due to the high cost of the Brooklyn and Jamaica lease, the LIRR entered receivership on March 4, 1850, but ended it without foreclosure on January 25, 1851. Most of the population of Long Island was closer to the shores than the LIRR's central alignment; only limited success was had in inducing settlers on the central Long Island scrub oak and pine barrens. An amendment to the LIRR's charter passed April 21, 1862 allowed it to build branches anywhere east of Jamaica. Several branches on the north and south shores were built under this clause.

=== Branches to the north and south shores ===
In 1851, under the General Railroad Act, the Hicksville and Cold Spring Branch Railroad was organized to build a line running northeast from Hicksville to Cold Spring. Oliver Charlick was motivated to build the line because of his fear of competition. The railroad was chartered on November 7, 1853, and it was completed to Syosset by July 3, 1854, and the right-of-way to Cold Spring Harbor was graded to White Oak Tree. This line was leased by the LIRR and was successful, tapping the rich farmland of the central North Shore. Syosset got almost all of its ridership from the villages of Oyster Bay, Huntington and Northport.

However, it was not yet complete. The line was intended to go to through White Oak Tree, present-day Laurel Hill before going to Cold Spring Harbor. There was insufficient funding for the project, and the LIRR got an extension from the Legislature in February 1858. Because of the Civil War the extension was impractical. The Hicksville and Cold Spring Branch Railroad had legislative approval to run as far as Cold Spring Harbor, but Charlick wanted an extension to Huntington. As a result, permission for the three miles of right-of-way had to be obtained. The iron to extend the railroad had been purchased in February 1866. The right-of-way began to be graded in May 1867. The right-of way and track that was once intended to terminate at Cold Spring Harbor was abandoned and a new right-of-way running east was built.

The line was extended to Huntington on January 13, 1868, and to Northport on April 25, 1868. The Smithtown and Port Jefferson Railroad was organized on June 3, 1870, to build from Northport Junction to Port Jefferson, opening on January 13, 1873. Northport then became the end of a mile and a half long branch. Passenger service to Northport ended in 1899.

When the LIRR was charted in 1834, it was authorized to construct a branch line to Sag Harbor, and in 1854, a survey was made for a branch from Riverhead to the Hamptons and Sag Harbor. However, the line was not built. The South Side Railroad of Long Island ran as far as Patchogue on the South Shore, and in order to insure a monopoly on the East End, President Oliver Charlick proposed building a branch to Sag Harbor, as it was originally planned, branching from Riverhead. However, Riverhead residents were not interested in a branch line, and Manorville was chosen as the split location. The line was to turn eastward to Sag Harbor at Eastport. The Sag Harbor Branch (now mostly part of the Montauk Branch), was finally opened from Manorville on the main line to Hampton Bays in 1869 and to Bridgehampton and Sag Harbor on May 9, 1870.

The Glen Cove Branch Railroad was incorporated on December 3, 1858. The Locust Valley Branch, now the Oyster Bay Branch, opened from Mineola on the main line north to Glen Head on January 23, 1865, and to Glen Cove in 1867, before finally being extended to Locust Valley on April 19, 1869.

However, the building of branches was retarded by the LIRR presidency of Oliver Charlick between 1863 and 1875. Charlick was known for only building branches where necessary to cut off plans by locals to build competing lines.

Charlick also rebuilt the wharf at Greenport in 1870, and operated a new Boston route via New London, the New London Northern Railroad, and the newly opened Boston, Hartford and Erie Railroad from September 1872 to 1875.

=== Brooklyn ===
The city of Brooklyn banned the LIRR from using steam propulsion within city limits effective July 1, 1851 (by ordinance adopted by the Brooklyn Common Council on June 9, 1851, and approved by the Mayor of Brooklyn on June 11, 1851). The railroad refused to comply until early October, when they stopped freight and passenger trains at Jamaica, directing passengers to take Fulton Street stages to Bedford and transfer there to "Jamaica Line" stages. The city granted permission to use steam under certain speed and noise restrictions on October 9.

Despite opposition from the Brooklyn Daily Eagle, Chapter 484 of the Laws of 1859, passed on April 19, 1859, allowed for the appointment of commissioners, empowered to contract with the LIRR to close the Cobble Hill Tunnel, cease using steam within city limits, and instead run horse cars for freight and passengers to the city line or East New York, connecting with steam trains to and beyond Jamaica there. The adjacent property were assessed, and from the assessment the LIRR was given $125,000 as compensation. By the fall of 1861, both use of steam as propulsion and of the tunnel had ceased.

The LIRR chartered the New York and Jamaica Railroad on September 3, 1859, and a supplement to the LIRR's charter passed March 12, 1860 authorized it to buy the NY&J and extend to Hunters Point. The LIRR carried through with the NY&J purchase on April 25, along with the purchase of a short piece of the Brooklyn and Jamaica at Jamaica, and the next day it cancelled its lease of the Brooklyn and Jamaica, but continued to operate over it. The Brooklyn Central and Jamaica Railroad, a consolidation of the B&J with the new Brooklyn Central Railroad, began operating from South Ferry over the top of the tunnel, along the B&J tracks to Flatbush Avenue, and south on the new Fifth Avenue Line in August 1860.

The new line to Hunters Point was officially opened on May 9, 1861, with regular service starting May 10. A ferry connection (Hunter's Point Ferry) was initially advertised to James Slip; connecting boats began running to East 34th Street Pier in October. The BC&J soon began operating horse cars over the old line from South Ferry, connecting with LIRR trains at Jamaica. The tunnel was closed off in December.

== Competition and consolidation on Long Island, 1854–1880 ==
From the 1850s through the 1870s rail service expanded considerably throughout Long Island, with several competitors vying for market share and making small, if any, profits. In 1875–76 a wealthy Whitestone, New York rubber baron named Conrad Poppenhusen acquired all the railroads. Poppenhusen, and his later successor Austin Corbin, were able to reorganize them under the umbrella of the LIRR thus forming the extensive network of lines that make up the railroad today.

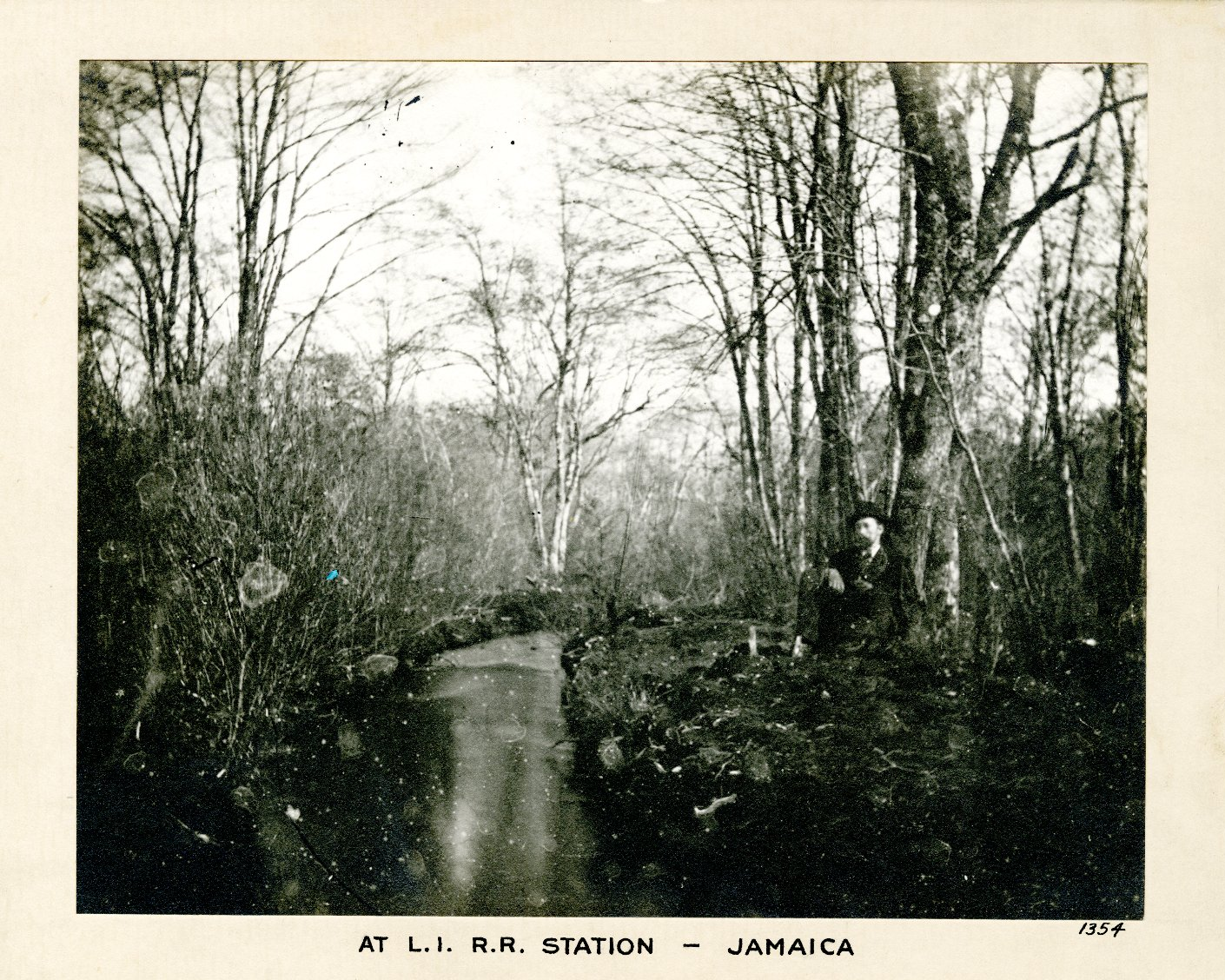
George Bradford Brainerd (American, 1845–1887). Long Island Rail Road Station, Jamaica, ca. 1872–1887. Collodion silver glass wet plate negative. Brooklyn Museum

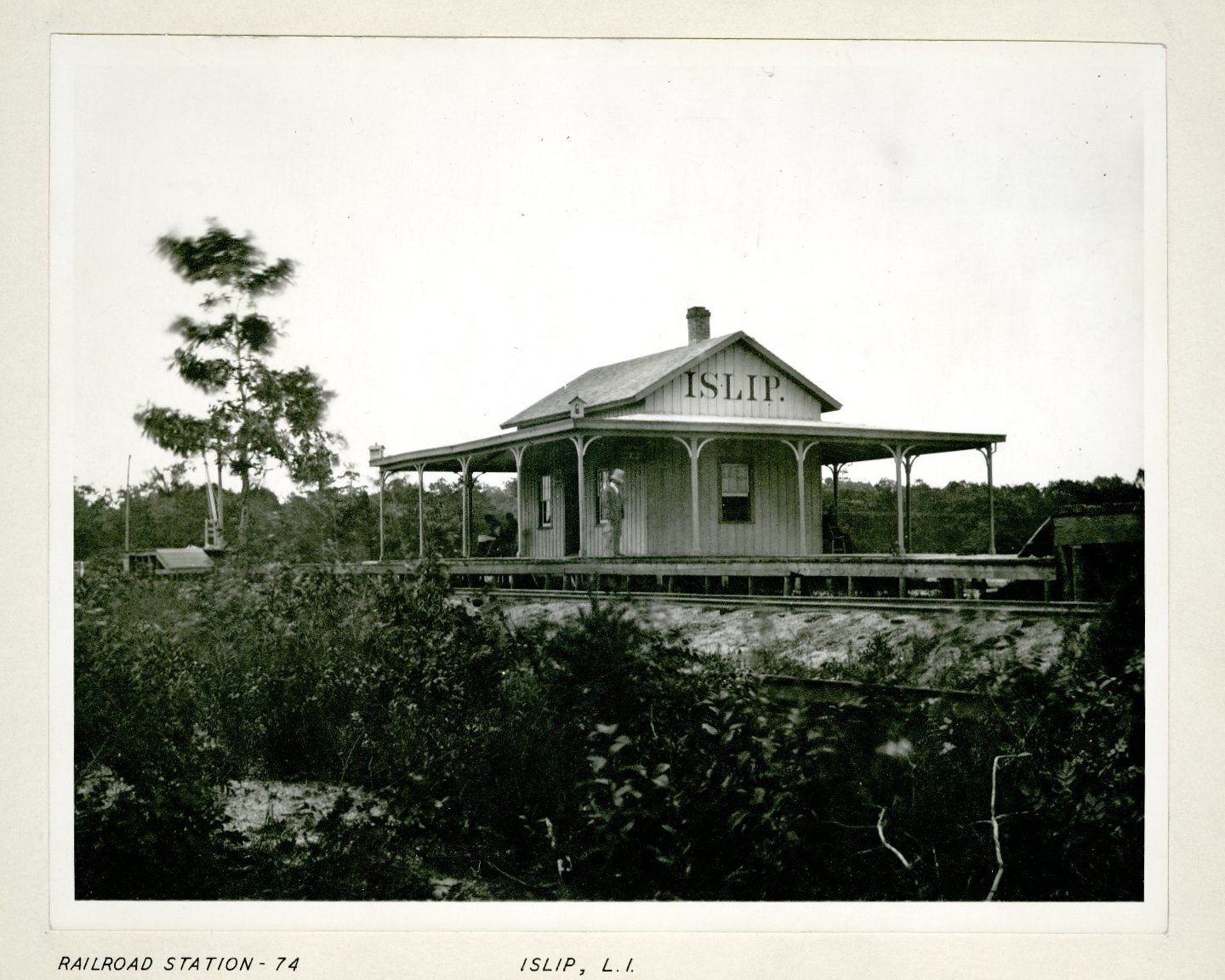
George Bradford Brainerd (American, 1845–1887). Railroad Station, Islip, Long Island, ca. 1872–1887. Collodion silver glass wet plate negative. Brooklyn Museum

The first non-LIRR line on Long Island was the Flushing Railroad, incorporated in 1852, which opened on June 26, 1854, from Long Island City to Flushing, before the LIRR opened its line to Long Island City. This line ran from Hunter's Point east to Haberman, and then it went north following what is close to what are now Maurice and Garfield Avenues, and then to Winfield and Flushing along the current Port Washington Branch ROW. In 1854, the railroad had ambitions to continue further east all the way out to Huntington, going through Roslyn, Oyster Bay and Cold Spring, on the north shore of Long Island.

In 1857, it fell into the hands of a receiver, and it was sold under foreclosure the following year. The company was reorganized in 1859 as the New York and Flushing Railroad when Oliver Charlick took over the railroad, which had fallen into a state of disrepair and whose quality of service had deteriorated. The residents of Flushing convinced the LIRR to incorporate the Flushing and Woodside Railroad on February 24, 1864, to build a competing branch to Flushing – Bridge Street and to Whitestone.

The line was intended to use the LIRR tracks from Hunter's Point to Woodside, where it would branch off and then run parallel to Jackson Avenue to Flushing, providing a more direct route than the New York and Flushing Railroad's. Work on the project begun in 1864, however, not much progress was made over the next three years because of legal problems in securing the right-of-way. Despite service complaints, New York and Flushing established a subsidiary called the North Shore Railroad of Long Island in 1866 which extended the line from Flushing to Great Neck. Unfortunately, when the line was about half completed, the NY&F realized that they could not survive the competition, and sold their line (and their lease on the North Shore Railroad of Long Island.) to the LIRR in the spring of 1867.

The LIRR benefitted by preventing the South Side Railroad from using the New York and Flushing access to the LIRR's Long Island City terminal, and by keeping the North Side Railroad from extending east to Huntington in competition with the LIRR. The LIRR also stopped construction on the incomplete Flushing and Woodside as it felt that the Flushing and Woodside Railroad would end up being a direct competitor to the LIRR. Charlick's intention was to revitalize the NY&F and to run a profitable service to Flushing without any competition. The New York & Flushing Railroad was operated as a branch, from Hunter's Point to Flushing.

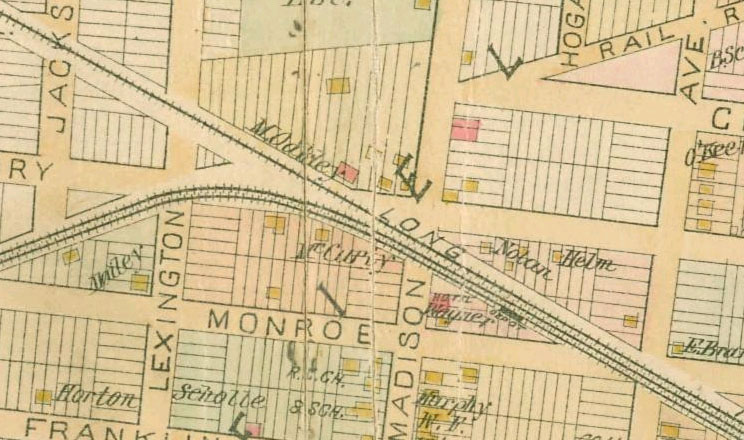
An 1891 map of Winfield Junction

A group of College Point and Whitestone citizens, feeling they had been tricked by the LIRR, convinced wealthy residents of College Point and Whitestone, including Conrad Poppenhusen, to buy out the stock of the old Flushing and Woodside Railroad and set out to complete the line. The construction of the line was done under the name of the Flushing and North Side Railroad, which was incorporated in 1868. This company had the right to build a line from Long Island City to Flushing and beyond to Roslyn, with a branch from Flushing to Whitestone. The group gained control of the unfinished Flushing and Woodside Railroad, and opened its line to Flushing, paralleling the LIRR from Long Island City to Woodside, in 1868 and to College Point and Whitestone in August 1869.

This new line attracted most of the traffic from the older New York and Flushing, and the LIRR wanted to get rid of its Flushing branch. In 1869, the state legislature authorized the Flushing and North Side to buy the New York and Flushing east of the LIRR crossing at Winfield; connections were built by the Flushing and North Side at Woodside/Winfield and Flushing to connect its lines. The Haberman to Winfield portion of the New York and Flushing line was abandoned and a new right-of-way through Woodside was built. The New York and Flushing continued to own the line west of Winfield, and the Hunter's Point to Haberman portion soon became the South Side Railroad's access to Long Island City. The Flushing and Woodside was merged into the Flushing and North Side in 1871, and its line was abandoned in favor of the ex-New York and Flushing line. The line was extended to Whitestone Landing in 1883 by the Whitestone and Westchester Railroad Company, having been consolidated with the Flushing, North Shore and Central Railroad in 1874, before it was built.

Soon after it sold the New York and Flushing to the Flushing and North Side, the LIRR decided to enter the Flushing business again, and chartered the Newtown and Flushing Railroad ("White Line") on March 8, 1871. It opened on November 10, 1873, paralleling the Flushing and North Side to the south and beginning a rate war.

The first major competitor to the LIRR, the South Side Railroad (SSRLI), was incorporated on March 23, 1860, to build from Brooklyn to Islip. An 1867 supplement to its charter authorized an extension to East Hampton. The company was partially owned by Willet Charlick, brother of the LIRR's Oliver Charlick. On October 28, 1867, it opened for service from Jamaica east to Babylon, and it opened to Sayville in December 1868, and to Patchogue in April 1869. Its Far Rockaway Branch opened in 1869 and it was extended by the Rockaway Railway to Seaside in 1872 and to the Neptune House at Beach 116th Street in 1875.

In order to obtain a terminal along the East River, the SSRLI asked the LIRR if a track connection could be made in Jamaica so that the LIRR's line could be used to Hunters Point. However, the LIRR refused and it stopped attempts by the South Side to use the Brooklyn, Central and Jamaica Railroad and to purchase the New York and Flushing Railroad, which would have connected at Laurel Hill. Finally, South Eighth Street in Williamsburg was decided to be the terminal. Service was extended westward to Bushwick on July 18, 1868, and the line was completed to the East River on November 4, 1868. West of Bushwick, the cars were pulled by horses because the city of Brooklyn did not allow steam trains.

In 1872 the South Side opened a new alignment, the Hunter's Point and South Side Railroad, from its main line at Fresh Pond northwest to Long Island City, using the old New York and Flushing Railroad for part of the way. The New York and Hempstead Railroad also opened in 1872, from Valley Stream on the South Side's main line northeast to Hempstead, and was leased to the South Side in 1873.

Charlick decided to build his own line to the Rockaways, in competition with the South Side's branch, which was built three years earlier, and incorporated the New York and Rockaway Railroad on December 30, 1870, to build from the Main Line near Rockaway Junction. Going south and west through the communities of St. Albans and Springfield Gardens, the line provided a more direct route to Cedarhust, crossing the South Side Railroad before paralleling it to Far Rockaway, where it once again crossed the SSRLI and ran to its terminal at Lockwood's Grove. On about July 1, 1871, the line was leased to the LIRR. The line, operated by the LIRR, opened in 1871 to Springfield Gardens and it opened on May 14, 1872, to Far Rockaway. The section of the line between Springfield Junction and Cedarhurst was abandoned a few years after the LIRR and the South Side merged in 1876, and from then on, the line through Valley Stream that belonged to the South Side was the only one used. In July 1876, the right-of-way for a connection between the Cedarhurst Cut-off and the South Side Railroad was obtained.

In 1904 – 1905, the line was going to be connected to the Atlantic Division, and property was purchased for the connection in March 1905, and it was completed and electrified in 1908. Service was never started and the line was unused until 1918, when the tracks were removed for other uses because of World War I. The line was rebuilt once again and was electrified once there was a building boom in the area in 1934. However, because of the Great Depression, the line was not used and it was torn up before being sold in 1934.

The Central Railroad of Long Island was incorporated in 1871 by Alexander T. Stewart, an entrepreneur who was developing what is now Garden City, to build from Flushing southeast and east to Bethpage, giving the LIRR direct competition to its Main Line. The line from Flushing to Hempstead via its Hempstead Branch opened in 1873, and was operated from opening by the Flushing and North Side; the rest of the line from Hempstead Crossing (where it crossed the LIRR's Hempstead Branch) to Bethpage opened later that year, as did the Central Railroad Extension to Babylon. The Flushing and North Side Railroad, Central Railroad, and several smaller owned lines were merged on August 1, 1874, to form the Flushing, North Shore and Central Railroad, controlled by the Poppenhusens.

The South Side entered receivership in 1873, and was sold in September 1874 to the Poppenhusens and reincorporated as the Southern Railroad of Long Island. The two Poppenhusen lines were connected at Babylon, and the Southern's branch to Hempstead was abandoned.

In 1876, the original LIRR (red) was combined with the Southern (orange) and Flushing, North Shore and Central (purple and blue).

President Oliver Charlick died in 1875, and the Poppenhusens acquired a majority of the LIRR's stock on January 26, 1876, placing all the lines on Long Island under their control. Conrad Poppenhusen was elected president on April 11, 1876, and the LIRR and Flushing, North Shore and Central boards were now identical. On May 3, the LIRR leased the Flushing, North Shore and Central and Southern. In the next few years, a number of lines and services were consolidated, and redundant lines were closed, including the Newtown and Flushing, the parallel Flushing and North Side west of Winfield, the Central between Flushing and Creedmoor (forming the Flushing Branch and Creedmoor Branch), part of the New York and Rockaway (later rebuilt as the Cedarhurst Cut-off), and the LIRR's branch to Hempstead.

Amidst complaints over the way the consolidation was handled, its $3 million cost, and problems caused by Charlick's policies, the LIRR entered receivership in late 1877. It was taken over by Colonel Thomas R. Sharp as receiver, who encouraged settlers to the island and travelers to the beaches, helping to promote the New York, Woodhaven and Rockaway Railroad (opened in 1880, later the Rockaway Beach Branch).

In late March 1877, Brooklyn finally authorized the LIRR to return to Atlantic Avenue with steam locomotives, and the LIRR leased the main line of the Atlantic Avenue Railroad (the final successor to the B&J) east of Fort Greene Place (just east of Flatbush Avenue) on June 1, 1877 for $60,000 per year. An opening excursion from the new Flatbush Avenue terminal was held on July 1, 1877, and regular service in the form of through trains to Long Island began on July 2. Small Atlantic Avenue rapid transit steam locomotives began providing local service for five cents west of East New York on August 13, later extended all the way to Rockaway Junction (east of Jamaica). (The Brooklyn City Rail Road established a similar "rapid transit" service a week later on its Third Avenue Line to Fort Hamilton.)

On August 7, 1876, the Brooklyn, Flatbush and Coney Island Railroad (Brighton Line) opened to a junction with the LIRR's Atlantic Branch near Franklin Avenue, and began operating over the LIRR to Flatbush Avenue and Long Island City. This agreement was terminated between the 1883 and 1884 seasons; the BF&CI was later connected to the Fulton Street Elevated.

== Austin Corbin years, 1880–1900 ==
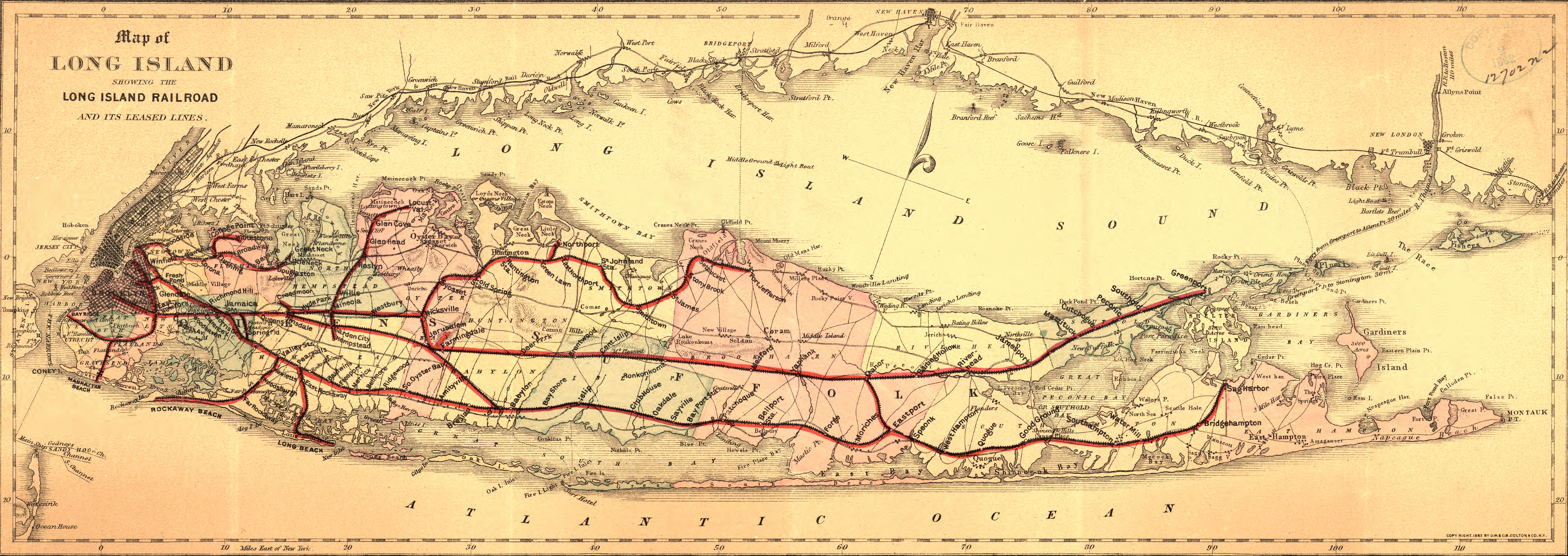
An 1882 map of the Long Island Rail Road

Hoping to build a line from Bay Ridge through East New York to Valley Stream, in 1870, the New York and Hempstead Railroad was incorporated. The line was leased by the South Side Railroad after two years of grading and excavating, but because of the financial panic of 1873 the project was drawn to a halt. This concept was resurrected when the New York, Bay Ridge and Jamaica Railroad was created in 1875, with its line following the current path of the Bay Ridge Branch freight branch of the LIRR. The line was finished up to Bath Junction by the end of the Summer 1876, where it crossed the Brooklyn, Bath and Coney Island Railroad, the predecessor of the BMT West End line of the New York City Subway. In August 1876, the two railroads made a temporary agreement that allowed passenger trains to run from Bay Ridge to Coney Island.

Having been sold to Austin Corbin in November 1876, the line was reorganized as the New York and Manhattan Beach Railway with the purpose of building a line from Long Island City to Manhattan Beach. Originally conceived as a freight railroad, the line then became a passenger railroad serving the Manhattan Beach Hotel that was being built by Corbin on the east end of Coney Island. The railroad was rebuilt as a narrow gauge 3 feet line instead of the standard 4 feet 8.5 inches. The newly built branch to Manhattan Beach branched from the main Bay Ridge line at Manhattan Beach Junction, and then it paralleled the Brooklyn, Flatbush and Coney Island Railroad, today's BMT Brighton Line, to its east. The line was extended up to Atlantic Avenue after a deal was made with the Brooklyn and Rockaway Beach Railroad, which allowed Corbin to build the new line along the right-of-way of the other road. The new line was inaugurated on July 19, 1877, with 13 trains running from both Bay Ridge and East New York to Manhattan Beach.

In order to continue the line into northern Brooklyn, the Glendale and East River Railroad was acquired. This line ran east from the terminal at Greenpoint to where it crossed the SSRLI's Bushwick Branch at Varick Street, before running east to the Cemetery of the Evergreens, where it then turned south to hook up with the Bay Ridge line in East New York. For the summer season in 1878, the line was opened on May 15, 1878. The final line of the NY&MB, the Kings County Central Railroad, which was leased by the NY&MB opened for service on June 29, 1878. This line ran from the edge of Prospect Park at Flatbush Avenue and Malbone Street, before running east through Malbone to Clove Road, and then south on Clove to Clarkson prior to merging with the Manhattan Beach line. The line closed on September 30, 1878, when the summer season ended, after it had been sold to a group that desired to rebuild the line to standard gauge and compete with the NY&MB by building a new line to Manhattan Beach. Their plans were never realized, and the right-of-way had been totally stripped by July 1879.

In 1878, Austin Corbin organized the Eastern Railroad of Long Island to directly compete with the LIRR, planning a line from New Lots on the New York and Manhattan Beach to Babylon.

Corbin was however able to acquire control of the LIRR in 1880, and brought it out of bankruptcy, becoming its president in 1881. Once Corbin had control of the LIRR, it was decided to standard gauge the Manhattan Beach Line and connect it with both the LIRR's Atlantic Branch and Lower Montauk Branch. This was completed in 1883, and this meant that Greenpoint segment was no longer necessary, and the portion west of South Side Crossing to Greenpoint was abandoned and torn up around 1890. The LIRR leased the NY&MB in 1882, not merging it until 1925. Under Corbin's entire 16-year control, the LIRR continuously paid dividends to its stockholders.

A number of new extensions and branches were built under his ownership. The New York and Long Beach Railroad opened in 1880, from Lynbrook south to Long Beach, and it was operated by the LIRR. The Long Beach Marine Railway built a line on Long Beach to Point Lookout in 1881 and was bought by the LIRR in 1886, only to be torn up in 1895.

In June 1879, under a mortgage foreclosure, what was left of the South Side Railroad was sold, and it was conveyed to the newly organized Brooklyn and Montauk Railroad, which was immediately leased as the Montauk Division to the LIRR. In 1881, the line was extended east from Patchogue to Eastport by the Brooklyn and Montauk Railroad, connecting it to the Sag Harbor Branch, opening on July 17, 1881. This created a continuous rail line along the South Shore to Sag Harbor. It was thought that the line connecting the Main Line to Sag Harbor via Eastport could be abandoned, but residents got the LIRR to use the line as a cutoff for trains between the Main Line and the Montauk Division, and as a way for passengers to travel between the North and South Forks. This service was termed as a "scoot". These trains ran from Greenport to Sag Harbor, and later to Montauk. In October 1889, the Brooklyn and Montauk Railroad merged into the LIRR.

The Long Island City and Manhattan Beach Railroad built a connection from the South Side (now the Montauk Branch) at Fresh Pond south to the New York and Manhattan Beach at Cooper Avenue in 1883, connecting the Manhattan Beach line with Long Island City. The New York, Woodhaven and Rockaway Railroad opened in 1880 from Glendale on the South Side line (Montauk Branch) south to Rockaway Park. Corbin bought it at bankruptcy in 1887 and reorganized it as the New York and Rockaway Beach Railway, but operated it separately until the LIRR leased it on July 1, 1904.The current Oyster Bay Branch was extended from Locust Valley to Oyster Bay in 1889. The New York Bay Extension Railroad opened as a branch from the South Side at Valley Stream northeast to Hempstead in 1893.The Wading River Branch opened from Port Jefferson east to Wading River in 1895.

Corbin attempted to buy the East River Ferry Company, which by then operated lines from Long Island City to James Slip, East 7th Street (abandoned within two years), and the East 34th Street (Manhattan) Pier, in December 1886, but was outbid by the Vanderbilts. (The ferry company was bought by the newly formed Metropolitan Ferry Company in July 1887.) Due to the slowness of the James Slip line, the LIRR began operating its own "Annex" line for businessmen to Pine Street (a block from Wall Street in the Financial District) at a loss in June 1887. The LIRR acquired the ferry company in March 1892 and began operating the boats itself.

In 1890, the Main Line was double tracked to Hicksville.

The LIRR tried a Boston route again in 1891, this time from Oyster Bay at the end of the recently extended Oyster Bay Branch to Wilson Point, Norwalk, Connecticut on the Housatonic Railroad. Trains used the New York and New England Railroad to reach Boston; this combination was advertised as the Long Island and Eastern States Line. The service was a failure, abandoned in 1892.

But the most notable line built by Frank Sherman Benson was the Montauk Extension Railroad from Amagansett, NY east to Fort Pond Bay in Montauk. Austin Corbin purchased land in Montauk with a plan was to build a deep water port at Fort Pond Bay, where trans-Atlantic passengers could disembark and travel into New York at "a mile a minute" (100 km/h) and thus save a day in travel time. Arthur W. Benson, president of Brooklyn Gas and Light Company and founder of Bensonhurst, Brooklyn, had acquired 10,000 acres (40 km^{2}) of land at auction by court order pursuant to an action in partition in 1879 for $151. In 1882 Benson purchased 1,100 acres of land at Napeague sold Corbin's real estate company right-of-way through Montauk to Fort Pond Bay. By 1895 Corbin had acquired a further 4,000 acres (16 km^{2}) from the Estate of Arthur W. Benson. The plans for Montauk Extension Railroad from Amagansett to Fort Pond Bay were signed by Frank Sherman Benson and are on file at the County Center in Riverhead. It was incorporated May 25, 1893 and opened in 1895.

In 1885, a connection was made between the Manhattan Beach Branch and Andrew Culver's Prospect Park and Coney Island Railroad, the current Culver Line, which enabled Culver trains to go to Manhattan Beach. In 1893, the LIRR, under Corbin, bought control of the Prospect Park and Coney Island Railroad (Culver Line), which ran from Coney Island north across the Bay Ridge Branch at Parkville to Brooklyn. It was operated as a division of the New York and Manhattan Beach Railway until 1899, when the line was leased by the BRT. Also in 1899, the line was electrified. The LIRR stopped operating trains over the Culver Line in 1909, prior to when the line was elevated in 1919. Several inclined ramps were built in the next few years, connecting the lines of the LIRR and to those of the Brooklyn Elevated Railroad. A ramp at 36th Street and Fifth Avenue in Sunset Park, connecting the Culver Line to the BERR's Fifth Avenue El, was completed in 1895; the BERR used it to operate to Manhattan Beach and West Brighton. In 1899, the Brooklyn Rapid Transit Company, the successor to the BERR, and the LIRR came to an agreement whereby the BRT would essentially have free rein west of Jamaica, and the LIRR would dominate to the east. Pursuant to this agreement, the BRT leased the PP&CI later that year, taking the LIRR out of the arrangements relating to the incline at 36th Street.

An incline connecting the Brooklyn Elevated's Broadway El and LIRR's Atlantic Branch at Chestnut Street in Cypress Hills opened in 1898, allowing BERR trains to run from Broadway Ferry in Williamsburg to Rockaway Park and Jamaica. An incline at Flatbush Avenue and Atlantic Avenue, connecting the LIRR's Atlantic Branch to the Fifth Avenue El, was opened in 1899, allowing LIRR "rapid transit" trains to run to the Brooklyn end of the Brooklyn Bridge. The BERR soon began using this incline and LIRR trackage to Manhattan Beach and Rockaway Park, but within a few months this service too was operated by the LIRR. The Flatbush Avenue incline was last used (by the LIRR) in 1905, while the last BRT trains (then running from Lower Manhattan via the Williamsburg Bridge) used the Chestnut Street incline to Rockaway Park in 1917.

With the death of Austin Corbin in June 1896 the LIRR was reorganized and the decline of the Manhattan Beach line started. Various rapid transit lines in Brooklyn had been unified under the Brooklyn Rapid Transit (BRT) system, and a connection was built between the Fulton Street Elevated and the Brighton Line, which was long opposed by Corbin, and this led to a decline in revenue for the Manhattan Beach. The LIRR and BRT agreed to keep out of the other's business after an agreement was made on April 1, 1899. The BRT's acquisition of all of the Brooklyn Elevated railroads was no longer opposed by the LIRR, and a connection at Sheepshead Bay was built so that trains from the Brighton Line could go to the Manhattan Beach Hotel. Control of the Culver Line was given to the BRT soon afterwards.

In 1898, an extension of the current Port Washington Branch from Great Neck to Port Washington was opened. With the completion of the Port Washington Branch, the LIRR reached its peak route mileage, and nothing has been added since. (This will change once East Side Access opens.) There had been previous talk of an eastern extension of the North Shore Branch to Roslyn to meet up with the Oyster Bay Branch. This would have created a more direct route to Roslyn, Glen Cove, and Locust Valley. In 1882, the first move to extend the line was made, when the officials of the LIRR toured Roslyn, Cold Spring and Oyster Bay, for a possible extension of the North Shore Branch from Great Neck to Roslyn and then through East Norwich to Syosset. Surveyors marked a route from Great Neck through Manhasset and Barrow Beach to Roslyn, and one more from Locust Valley to Northport. Because of the high cost of $400,000, this project was doomed. In December 1885, the farmers along the line of the proposed extension to Roslyn, and from Oyster Bay to Huntington were donating the right-of-way. Ten years later, in 1895, Austin Corbin was convinced by the residents of Port Washington to extend the line, but to their village. On March 30, 1896, the LIRR began staking off the line of the proposed extension between Great Neck and Port Washington. In April 1896, the Great Neck and Port Washington Railroad was incorporated to build the extension. Surveys of the right-of-way were completed in May 1896. Once Corbin died, it was unsure whether the new President of the LIRR Baldwin would finish it, but because it was such a short extension he agreed to finish it. Work progressed through March and April 1898 after some delays in the winter of 1896–1897, and July 1 was set as the completion date. In order to cross over Manhasset Bay, a viaduct was built. To this date, it is the highest bridge on the railroad, being 679 feet long, and 81 feet above the average height of water. Due to favorable spring weather, the branch opened early on June 23, 1898.

On May 13, 1899, the LIRR bought the Montauk Steamboat Company, which had competed with its own steamboats for connecting freight and passenger service. Routes operated under LIRR control included New York-Greenport and connections from the eastern terminals to New London and Block Island. Most of the lines ran until the 1910s, when they were abandoned due to competition from highways and the U.S. Navy Department prohibiting operation through Plum Gut (to Block Island) in 1917; the New London connection continued until 1927.

== Pennsylvania Railroad ownership, 1900–1949 ==
Revenue passenger traffic, in millions of passenger-miles
Year	Traffic
1925	1573
1929	1893
1933	1304
1944	2055
1960	1477
1970	1761

Keystone herald adopted under PRR ownership

Corbin began planning for direct access to Manhattan by the late 1880s, considering plans to extend the Atlantic Branch under the East River in a tunnel and north to Grand Central Terminal (this was later built as part of the New York City Subway, now the IRT Lexington Avenue Line and IRT Eastern Parkway Line), or to cross the East River on a bridge from Long Island City to near 37th Street and again run to Grand Central. The Pennsylvania Railroad simultaneously began planning access across the Hudson River to Manhattan, and LIRR president William H. Baldwin, Jr. started negotiating in 1900 to enter the PRR terminal. That year the PRR paid $6 million for a controlling interest in the LIRR, and soon incorporated the companies to build the New York Tunnel Extension from New Jersey through Manhattan to Long Island City. Simultaneously, the new Sunnyside Yard at Long Island City was built to provide a place to turn New Jersey trains. The new Pennsylvania Station opened on September 8, 1910, serving only LIRR trains for over two months before the New Jersey side was completed.

The James Slip and Annex ferries to Lower Manhattan were abandoned in 1907 and 1908, before the tunnel was completed, but the ferry to 34th Street continued to operate until 1925.

The new station and tunnel network provided direct rail service from Long Island to Manhattan, resulting in vast increases in both total passengers and daily commuters. Total annual ridership increased from 34 million in 1911, the first full year that Penn Station was in operation, to a peak of 119 million in 1929. By then, 61.7% of LIRR passengers were daily commuters, up from over 30% in 1911. But the IND Queens Boulevard Line subway reached Jamaica in 1937, and by 1940 80% of the short-haul commuters from Queens had switched to the five-cent subway ride; along with other factors such as trolleys and automobiles, this lowered the annual ridership to 67.5 million. During this period, the LIRR gained control of most of the connecting and competing trolley lines on Long Island. Its first acquisitions were the Ocean Electric Railway and Huntington Railroad, both by 1899. Several more lines were built in the early 1900s, and Long Island Consolidated Electrical Companies was incorporated in 1905 as a holding company for the LIRR's trolley properties. It gained 50% ownership in the closely related New York and Long Island Traction Company and Long Island Electric Railway in 1905 and 1906 respectively, the other half going to the Interborough Rapid Transit Company. Most of the lines had ceased operating by 1924, and the NY&LI and LIE were both sold at foreclosure in 1926. The final abandonment was the Ocean Electric on Rockaway Beach Boulevard in 1928.

In 1905, the Oyster Bay Branch was double-tracked to Roslyn.

Revenue freight traffic, in millions of net ton-miles
Year	Traffic
1925	163
1933	97
1944	148
1960	77
1970	73

When Belmont Park opened on May 4, 1905, about 19,000 passengers—nearly half of all attendees—took the railroad to the racetrack on opening day. The first electric trains to Belmont Park ran on October 2, 1905, the opening day of the fall meet. The original station was located south of Hempstead Turnpike; the present terminal north of Hempstead Turnpike was opened in 1957.

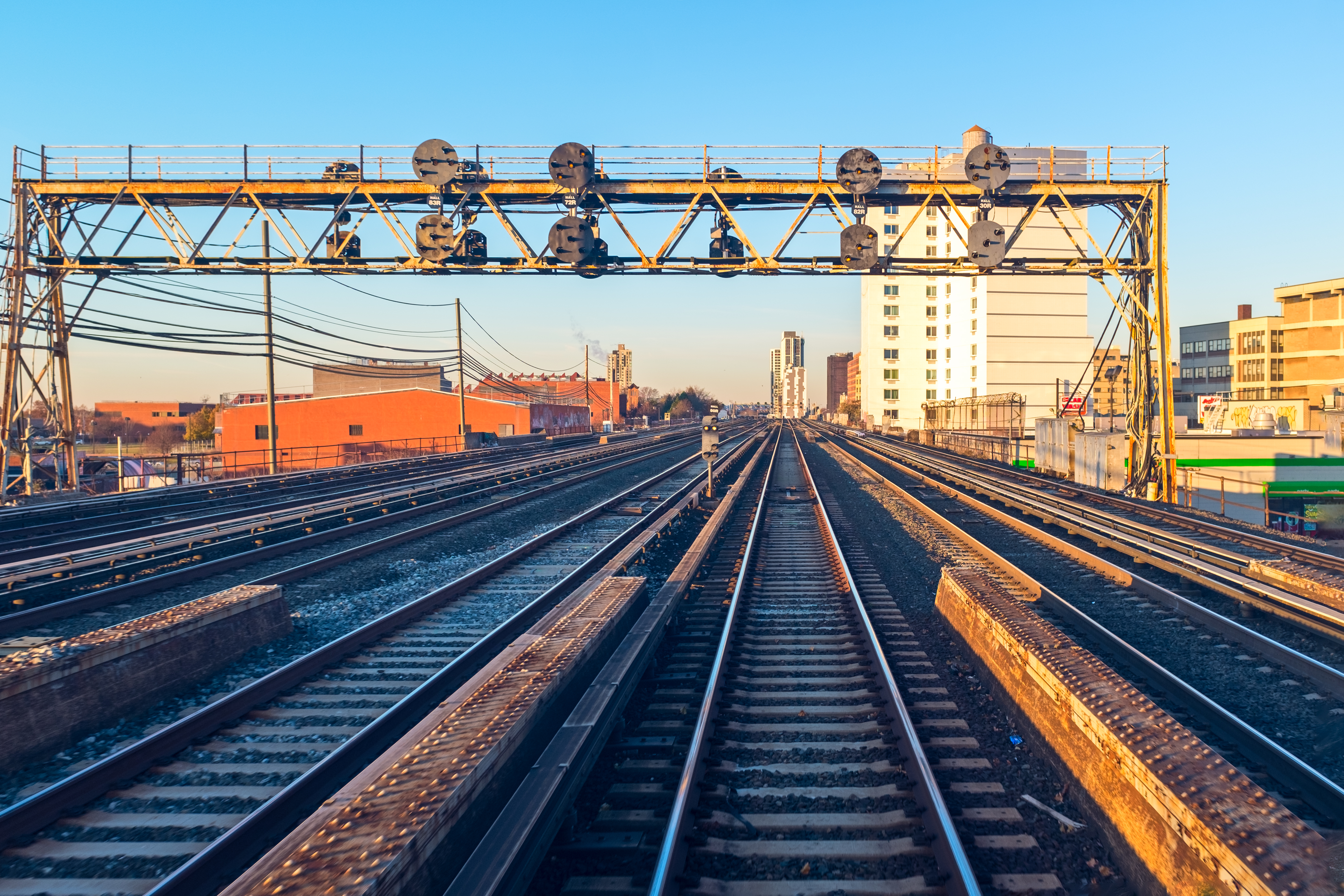
The LIRR (seen here approaching Jamaica station) still had some PRR style positional signals on the main line in 2019

The LIRR also began electrifying (with third rail direct current) and grade separating its urban and suburban lines in the 1900s.

Because of increasing fatalities at the Atlantic Branch's 50 grade crossings, a law was passed from the City of Brooklyn and the City of New York to remove grade crossings in 1897. As part of the law, a tunnel would have been built to Lower Manhattan, but because of the large cost, it was removed in 1900. Work commenced in December 1901, after a new version of the law was passed on April 8, 1901, without any mention to the tunnel. The portion from Flatbush Avenue to Bedford Avenue the line was to be a tunnel, and the portion from Nostrand Avenue to Ralph Avenue was to be elevated. The next section, between Ralph Avenue and Howard Avenue was to be built as a tunnel, and the remaining portion to Atkins Avenue would have been an elevated structure. The first portion of the line to be opened was between Manhattan Crossing and Atkins Avenue. This portion opened on May 28, 1903, and the second part, the elevated from Nostrand Avenue to Ralph Avenue, opened on November 23. to Manhattan Crossing, The first tunnel segment, the one between Ralph Avenue and Howard Avenue, opened in 1904. Because of delays resulting in the construction of the new Flatbush Avenue terminal, service to the new underground Flatbush Avenue did not commence until November 5, 1905. Prior to the opening of the underground station, trains used a connection with the Brooklyn Rapid Transit's Fifth Avenue Elevated and temporary wooden platforms were built on the connection. The new terminal opened on April 1, 1907. The easternmost elevated section of the line was replaced by a tunnel around the year 1940.

The first electrification was on the Atlantic Branch and Rockaway Beach Branch from Downtown Brooklyn to Jamaica and Rockaway Park, completed on July 26, 1905 (and eliminating the "rapid transit" service from 1877). When the IRT expanded its service from Bowling Green to Atlantic Avenue, the usage of the Atlantic Branch went up. By the 1910 opening of Penn Station, most of the lines in New York City had gained third rail, and the New York City-area electrification program was complete in 1913, with the Montauk Division as the only major holdout.

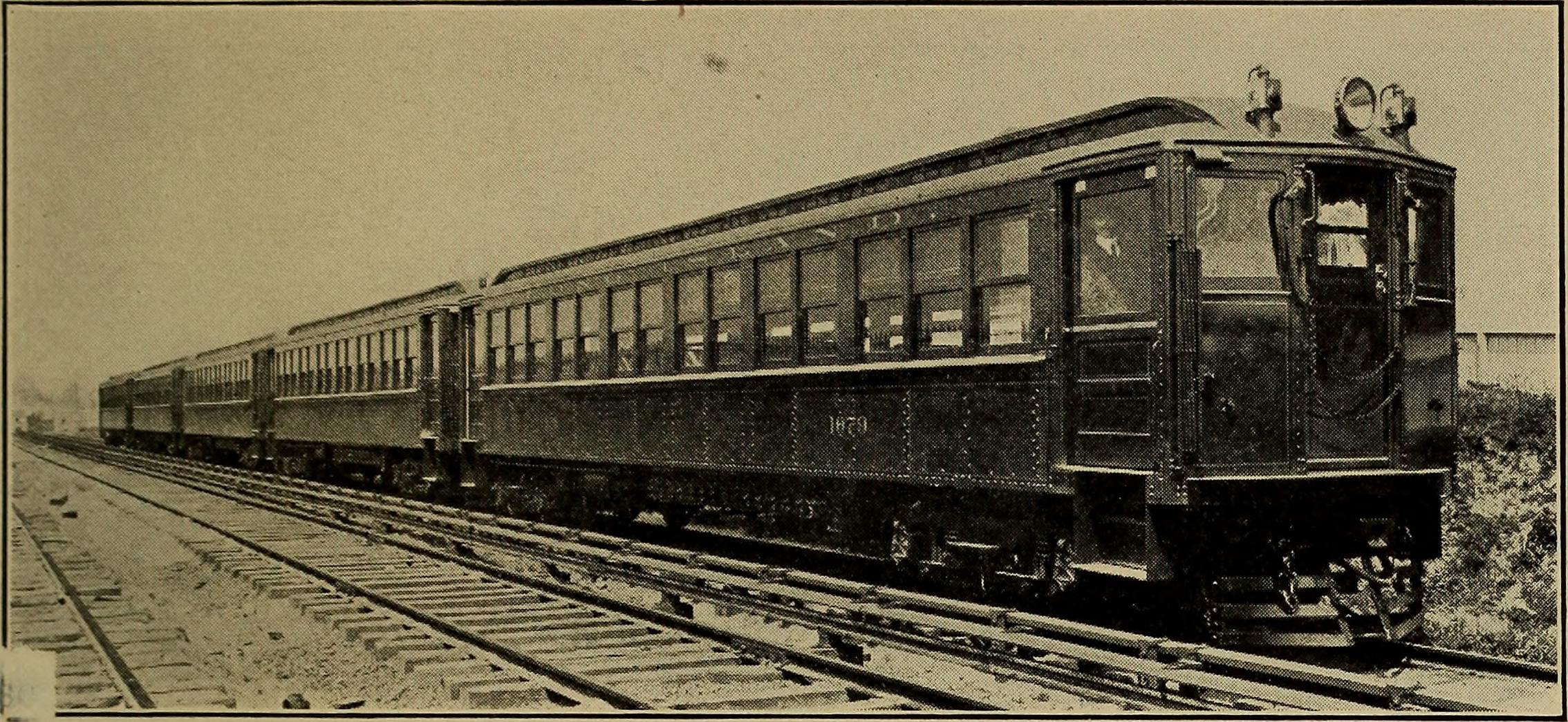
Electric coaches of the LIRR, ca. 1911

A big grade-elimination project was started on the Bay Ridge Branch in 1906 and was completed by 1915. Later electrification included the Montauk Division from Jamaica out to Babylon in 1925 and the Bay Ridge Branch (for New York, New Haven and Hartford Railroad freight off the 1916 Hell Gate Bridge) in 1927. The PRR began directly operating the LIRR under lease on October 1, 1928.

The railroad continued to actively promote Long Island as an attractive residential area. The railroad's Passenger Department, led by Hal B. Fullerton, issued numerous publications touting the virtues of life on Long Island as compared with city life. As explained by historian Charles Sachs, Fullerton spent thirty years in the Passenger Department "promoting and advertising events, activities, or plans that would bring public attention to the island's potential for sport, recreation, business, and residential development for both the middle classes and urban elite."

The price of a monthly commute ticket was unchanged from 1918 to 1947: $10.56 Penn Station to Mineola, $13.81 to Babylon, $10.07 to stations from The Raunt to Rockaway Park. Monthlies to Brooklyn were $2.20 less.

At the end of 1925 the LIRR operated on 397 miles of road and 957 miles of track; mileages in 1970 were 326 and 738.

Palsgraf v. LIRR (1928) is a major case in American Tort law which established the legal standard of "proximate cause" based on foreseeability. The case involved a passenger (Palsgraf) who was injured on the platform as the result of a chain of events (another passenger dropping a package on the tracks which turned out to be fireworks that exploded and indirectly caused the injury to Mrs. Palsgraf) which the court deemed unforeseeable on the part of the LIRR. It is a milestone decision in American law.

On October 19, 1926, the portion of the line between Valley Stream and Franklin Avenue in Garden City was electrified and it was inaugurated with a special train. New through service running between Valley Stream and Mineola began on the West Hempstead Branch the next day. The freight sidings, however, were not electrified until 1927 and 1928.The connection to the Oyster Bay Branch was severed in 1928, while the portions of the line between Mineola and Country Life Press and between Country Life Press and West Hempstead were taken out of revenue passenger service in June 1935 due to the costly grade crossing elimination improvements imposed upon the LIRR by the Interstate Commerce Commission, as well as the New York Public Service Commission. This meant that no more through service between Valley Stream and Mineola could operate. It was anticipated that the Oyster Bay Branch would be electrified next, and in November 1928, railroad officials investigated the possibility. However, due to high costs, with the electrification of the branch necessitating grade-crossing elimination, the plan was shelved.

In the 1930s, the use of the Manorville Branch for service between the forks declined, and limited service using the line continued into the World War II years, and in 1946 the line was removed from timetables, and it was no longer used after March 3, 1949. On November 25, 1949, the Interstate Commerce Commission approved the LIRR's request to abandon the line, and the tracks were removed in the winter of 1950.

== Lean years, 1949–1966 ==
Rail service – and in particular passenger rail service – declined dramatically after World War II as it faced competition from the rise of the automobile and improved air travel. Passenger rail travel was very vulnerable because government regulations required certain levels of service even if unprofitable. On Long Island, while new highways and automobiles became available in the years following World War II, the railroad was struggling financially and its infrastructure and rolling stock were not well-maintained.

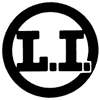
Herald adopted in 1950, after PRR operation ended.

Despite a doubling of operating costs since 1917, the LIRR was not permitted to raise its fares until 1947. It declared bankruptcy on March 2, 1949, after which the PRR stopped supporting its debts, transferring it to the subsidiary American Contract and Trust Company. Direct PRR operations ended on May 1. In the next year, the LIRR suffered three accidents (the Rockville Centre, Huntington and Kew Gardens train crashes), killing a total of 115 passengers. The Jamaica Bay trestle on the Rockaway Beach Branch caught fire in May 1950, and it was abandoned on October 3, 1955, south of Ozone Park. It was then sold to New York City, which rebuilt it for the IND Rockaway Line subway extension.

The LIRR rolling stock, most of which dated from the early 1900s, proved to be a major problem. Built at a time when the average person's height and weight was smaller, the seating arrangements in the cars proved to be completely inadequate for mid-century commuters, who were much bigger in stature. The antiquated stock was also noted for frequently breaking down. It was not uncommon in an average day for there to be nearly ten to fifteen cancelled trains. Noted New York writer Robert Caro states in his Robert Moses biography The Power Broker that around this time the LIRR gained the nickname "The Toonerville Trolley." Despite these setbacks, the LIRR forged ahead with enticing Long Islanders to commute to work rather than drive. The railroad was able to obtain a variety of different lightweight and heavyweight stock for both its diesel and east end parlor car service. Most of these new cars were obtained from the Pennsylvania Railroad and from other faltering railroads at the time. These cars were much newer and, together with some new electric MU cars and a fleet of new diesel-hauled coaches, provided the railroad with its first air-conditioned fleet. The railroad even made an attempt at expanding service. In the 1950s, there was a proposal from City planning authorities to build a new high speed LIRR route down the center median on the newly built Long Island Expressway, however this idea was rejected by master highway builder Robert Moses.

The LIRR also took other steps to improve its physical image and its operations. In the 1950s they started a new publicity campaign, adopting a new "Dashing Dan" and "Dashing Dottie" logo and painted its trains in a gray color scheme. The railroad also continued to perform major capital improvement projects. During the 1950s and 1960s the Montauk Branch between Jamaica and Babylon continued going through a massive grade crossing elimination project, with the line being elevated from street level over a number of years; the Rockville Centre train crash occurred on a temporary track that was laid while the elevated viaduct was being built. Mandated by federal and state agencies after the 1950 train collisions, the railroad began to install an Automatic Speed Control system to supplement (and later replace) the wayside automatic block signal system on a majority of its lines. Finally, the LIRR was able to completely replace its steam locomotives with diesels, with the last steam-hauled trains running on October 8, 1955. Two of these PRR G5 class locomotives survive today.

In the summer of 1951, as a cost-cutting measure, all trains operating in and out of Penn Station using electric locomotives were changed to originate and terminate in Jamaica or Long Island City. As a result, there was no direct service to New York, and passengers were forced to switch to an electric train, and "the moniker "change at Jamaica" became the norm".

In August 1954, the state of New York passed legislation that took the LIRR out of bankruptcy and designated it as a Railroad Redevelopment Corporation, and over twelve years, $60 million was provided to improve the LIRR. This improvement focused on the western electric territory. This was complemented by tax abatements for the LIRR and the PRR. It was then promised by the PRR that it would reinvest profits into the LIRR's improvement program. At this time, 220 new Pullman Standard coaches were ordered in order to replace older cars from before World War I, which were then scrapped. About 700 of the older cars were rebuilt with improved heating and ventilation, new floors, new seating, and new lighting. Many grade crossings were eliminated and heavily travelled lines were refurbished.

In 1956, some freight trains were moved by the LIRR to overnight hours, allowing for better running times and cutting service times to Eastern Suffolk County.

By 1963, the Main Line beyond Riverhead to Greenport was served by only one daily passenger train and a thrice-weekly freight train, though a bridge was proposed from Greenport to Rhode Island. (Now (2018) there are four daily passenger trains east of Ronkonkoma to Greenport Terminal.)

=== Road n' Rail bus service ===
For some time, the LIRR had tried to attract customers on the East End. In 1955, an attempt was made to do this. A single-car prototype train ran along the Main Line to Riverhead, but this turned out to be a failure. During the mid-1960s the LIRR lost mail contracts, which had justified service on the East End. One way to continue service to these stations would have been to implement bus service, which could then replace certain train trips, reducing the need of maintenance on the Montauk Branch and Ronkonkoma Branch. The LIRR decided to implement such a service: in the 1960s and 1970s, the LIRR operated a bus route between Greenport and Huntington as a combination "Road 'n' Rail" service, paralleling the Montauk Branch between Babylon and Montauk. Passengers on short trips were expected to be attracted to the buses as they were cheaper than rail, and because they ran through a heavily populated area that had no rail stations.

An additional reason was competition. Long Island Transit Systems, Inc., at the end of 1960 sought permission to operate express bus service via the Long Island Expressway and New York State Route 25 between New York City and Riverhead, where it would continue easterly by arrangement with Sunrise Coach Lines, Inc. to Greenport. At around this time, the LIRR proposed its own bus plan, and in July 1961 the Public Service Commission (PSC) ruled that Long Island Transit's petition was not in the public's best interest. However, it would grant the LIRR's proposal if the railroad received agreement from local governments along the route by January 18, 1962. On January 17, 1962, the PSC authorized service as far as Southold and an extension to Greenport was granted later on. The buses first ran on Monday, February 19, 1962, with the desire to triple passenger service in Central Suffolk and the North Fork. Because of its popularity, another bus route was initiated on the South Shore from Amityville to Montauk after approval from the PSC on May 10, 1963. This route ran along Montauk Highway from Shirley to the Shinnecock Canal. Six round trips a day would supplement rail service, and four new air-conditioned buses were ordered. Bus service began on this route on June 8, 1963.

The new plan replaced trains with six daily bus round trips between Riverhead and Huntington, half of which went on to Greenport, and two round trips on the weekend between Greenport and Huntington, where connections could be made for train service to New York. Bus service was one way to continue service to eastern stations, replacing certain train trips, and therefore reducing schedules. In turn came reduced maintenance, and extended trip times. The LIRR, with the bus service implemented, was allowed to discontinue one westbound train out of Greenport and one eastbound to Greenport. These buses also served new communities along New York State Route 25 in Central Suffolk, which were three to five miles from Main Line stations. This brought the railroad to passengers rather than having them travel to the railroad. In order to save time, buses ran express along the Smithtown Bypass. Zones were established by the PSC in order to prevent competition with local bus routes. The area between Huntington station and Deport Road and Jericho Turnpike was Zone one. The second zone was Jericho Turnpike between Larkfield Road and Veteran's Memorial Highway. Middle County Road between Stony Brook Road and Evergreen Avenue was the third zone. The fourth zone was along Middle Country Road between Evergreen Drive and New York State Route 112. The fifth zone was from Riverhead to Greenport.

The original Road n' Rail buses were operated under contract with the LIRR, by Huntington Coach Corporation. In June 1973, the Metropolitan Suburban Bus Authority (MSBA) became the owner of LIRR Road n' Rail, and the "Town of Huntington" took over Huntington Coach routes as Huntington Area Rapid Transit (HART).The bus route primarily traveled along New York State Route 25 Jericho Turnpike. There were six bus trips each way weekdays, and four on the weekends.

In the beginning of summer 1973, the LIRR discontinued direct Huntington to Riverhead bus service, relying on a faster route. A total of eleven eastbound buses and twelve westbound buses were in service in summer 1976, at the peak of the Road n' Rail service. The next summer, only seven eastbound and nine westbound buses were operated. Service continued to be reduced, with weekend service dropped by a round trip in 1978, and the service was reduced to only weekends during summer 1981. In 1982, the service only operated during midday hours, showing the LIRR's desire to return train service. Bus service became unreliable and undesirable with population growth on the East End, and North Fork bus service to Babylon was reduced to a pair of daily round trips on October 18, 1982, before finally being eliminated. Road n' Rail bus service to Greenport ended on weekdays on September 8, 1981, and it ended on weekends on October 17, 1983. After repeated threats of abandonment, the Speonk to Montauk segment was rebuilt in the late 1970s, and the project was completed by summer 1979. All remaining Montauk Branch Road-n-Rail service ended with this timetable. With the elimination of Road n' Rail, train service returned to its previous level.

=== 1963: the Better Rail Service for Nassau County Plan ===
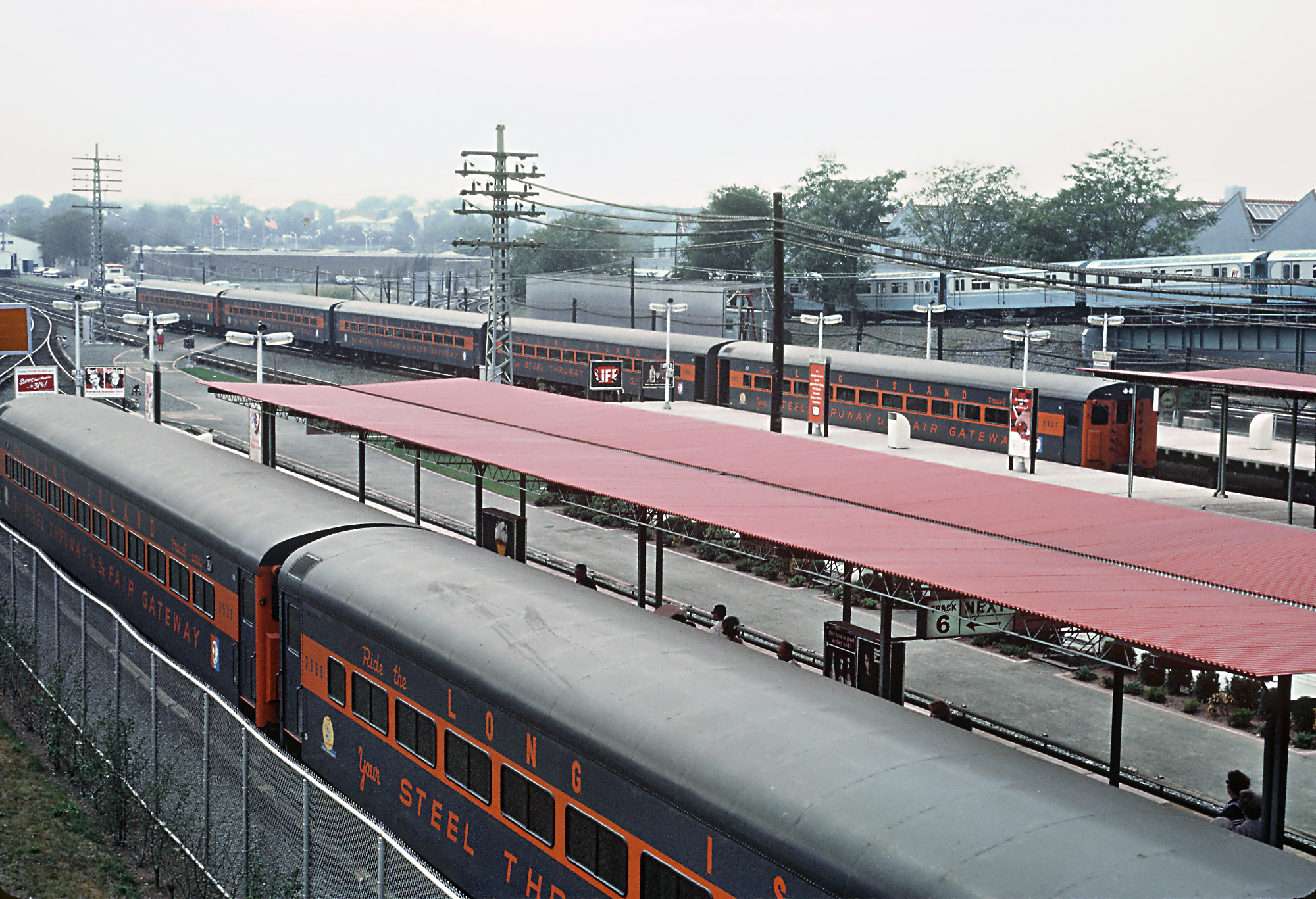
Long Island Rail Road trains at the World's Fair in September 1964

In June 1963, the Nassau County Planning Commission issued a report and the Nassau County Department of Transportation and Franchises issued a report called "Better Rail Service for Nassau County". Many projects were proposed in the report. As part of the project, the Main Line would have been electrified from Mineola to Bethpage, and grade crossings would be eliminated on the entire Main Line to Bethpage. Multiple stations would be rehabilitated as part of the plan. The New Hyde Park and Mineola stations would have been rebuilt, and using air rights, they would have been combined with new offices or other commercial structures. The Grumman station, in order to better serve employees of the aircraft plant, would have been relocated and improved. The Bethpage station was to be renamed Bethpage – Plainview, and it was slated to become a major bus-rail and park-and-ride interchange. The station would have been moved east 500 yards to go alongside the Oyster Bay Expressway with parking facilities provided on the south side of the tracks. The station would have become the terminal of the electrified Main Line, and would have become a transfer point with diesel trains running farther east on the Montauk and Ronkonkoma Branches. The Main Line would have been expanded to three or four tracks to allow for a branch running to Roosevelt Field, where a major transportation center including bus, rail, and helicopter services would be provided. The two-track branch would have come off of the mainline at Glen Cove Road in Carle Place before running in a new right-of-way to the proposed Roosevelt Field Transportation Center near the Meadowbrook Parkway. 28 minute express service between Roosevelt Field and Midtown Manhattan would have been available. Eight trains per hour in the peak, and four per hour in the off peak would have been in place. Possible long-distance trains through Penn Station to Washington D.C. or Florida was also considered. Most trains to the new line would have terminated at Roosevelt Field, but with a new connection built to the Garden City–Mitchel Field Secondary some trains could run further east. The secondary would have been rebuilt and would have had stations built at East Meadow and Levittown. This would have been part of the Nassau Loop. Trains once leaving Levittown would loop to turn onto the Main Line stopping at Bethpage–Plainview before heading toward Manhattan.

Jamaica station would have been reconstructed, with direct access to the New York City Subway and a provision for express bus service to JFK Airport. Woodside would have been rehabilitated with provisions for the proposed Queens Bypass subway line that would have run alongside the Main Line before either using the abandoned Rockaway Beach Branch or merging with the IND Queens Boulevard Line at Forest Hills. A provision for express bus service running to LaGuardia Airport via the Brooklyn Queens Expressway would have been made. Service to Grand Central would have been provided with a one track loop, branching off in Sunnyside with a tunnel to 50th Street and Park Avenue. Three stations would have been built; one at 52nd Street between Lexington Avenue and Third Avenue, one under Grand Central Terminal between 45th Street and 47th Street, and a station on Madison Avenue between 35th Street and 37th Street. The line would connect with East River Tunnels at 33rd and 32nd Streets so that trains could continue to Long Island. A provision would have been built for a possible future extension down Madison Avenue. Also, as part of the plan, the Atlantic Branch would have been turned over to the New York City Subway to allow for a lower fare for people commuting to Lower Manhattan, and it would have provided a high speed subway service. This subway service, under the plan, would have ultimately been extended to Belmont Park eliminating the need for LIRR trains to serve local stations between Jamaica and Belmont Park. The whole project would have cost $103 million, taking six years to complete.

== State ownership, 1966–present ==
=== 1960s–1980s: M1s, push-pulls, and electrification extensions ===
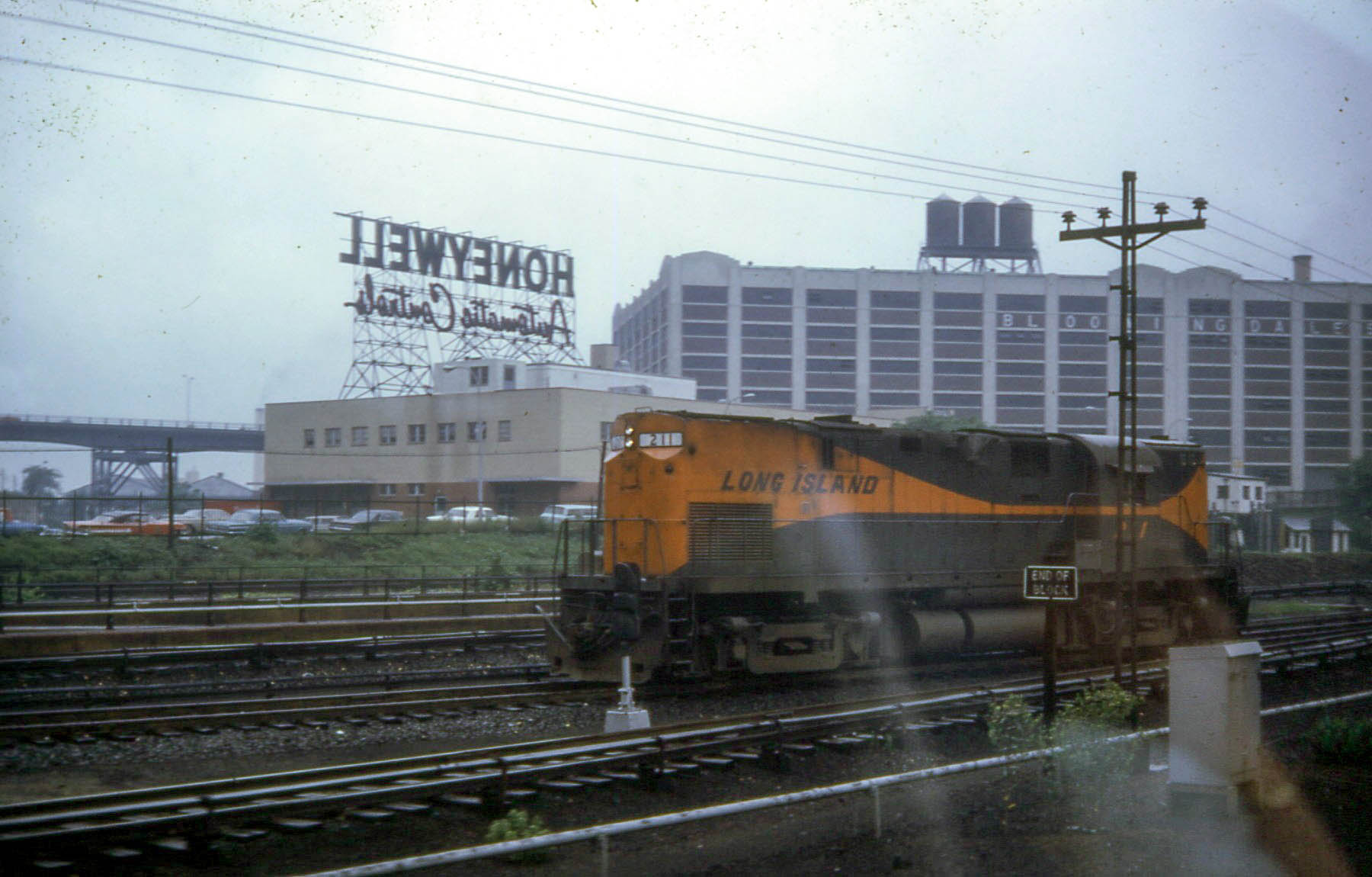
A LIRR ALCO Century 420 in 1967.

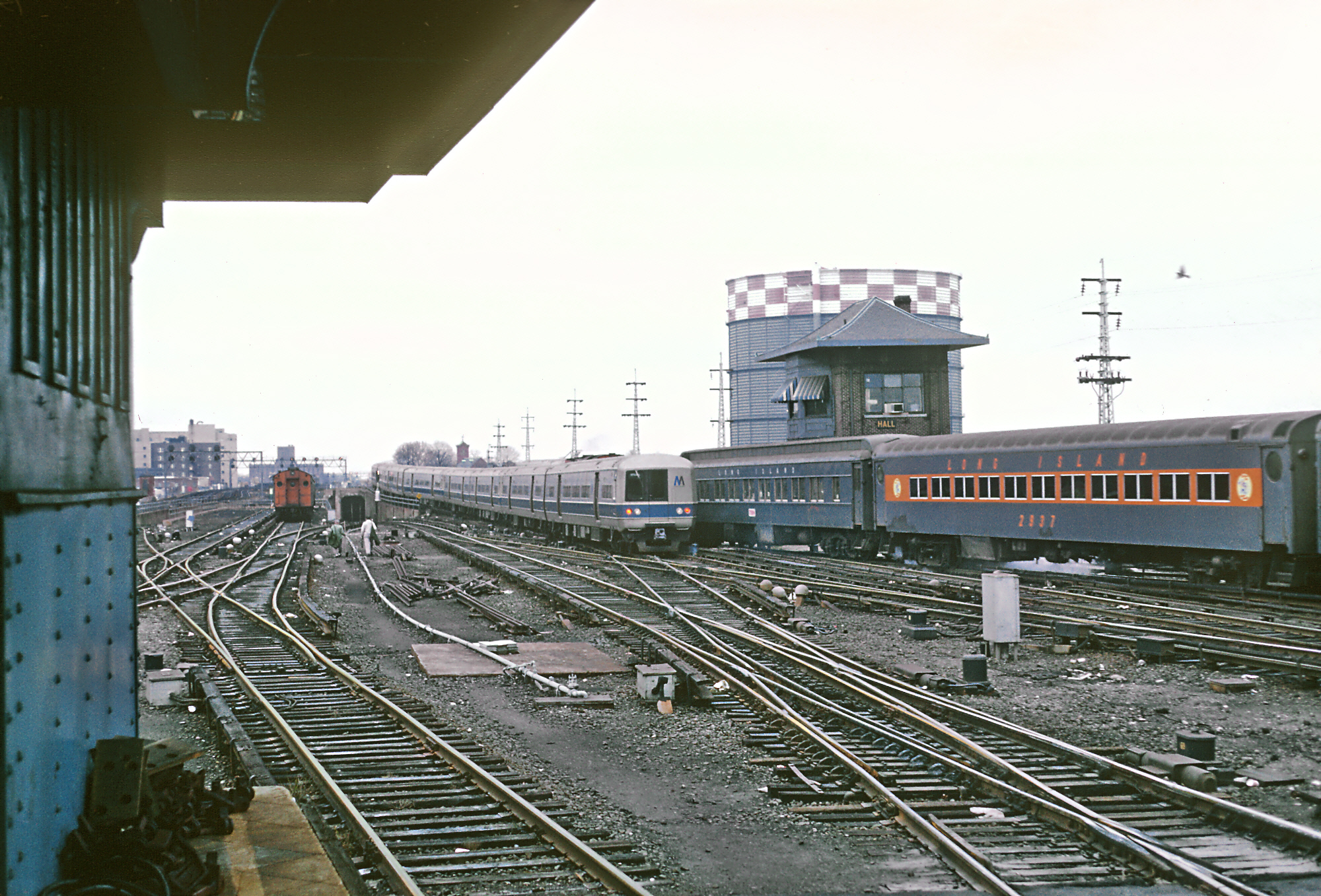
Long Island Rail Road trains at Jamaica Station on November 9, 1969

The PRR was looking to rid itself of the money-losing LIRR, its most costly subsidiary, but no one was willing to buy it. Various plans, including turning it into a monorail or abandoning the eastern extremities and turning the rest into part of the New York City Subway, had been proposed. On January 20, 1965, the state of New York decided to buy the LIRR. Governor Nelson A. Rockefeller set in motion work that was need to draft the enabling legislation, to determine a realistic value for the property. The Pennsylvania Railroad submitted a very high initial estimate, and the result of negotiations was a direct payment of $65 million and a similar amount of relief for unpaid taxes. In return, all shares of stock were surrendered to the State along with the property, rolling stock, and infrastructure. The Metropolitan Commuter Transportation Authority (now the MTA) was formed to buy and operate the LIRR. However, trimming the LIRR from its system did not provide the relief the PRR sought; after the 1968 merger into Penn Central Transportation it was bankrupt in 1970.The MCTA set out to improve the LIRR by instituting massive capital improvements in the form of a strengthened electric traction substation system, accelerated track improvements, and new rolling stock.

Once under State ownership, the Dashing Dan logo was dropped and a new paint scheme was created for locomotives and coaches. The new electric coaches, the M1 cars, replaced the aging Multiple Unit fleet. The cars were put into service between 1968 and 1972. The cars were called "Metropolitans", and they were clad in stainless steel, with air-conditioning and lighting, as well as semi-bucket seating. Quarter point doors were installed in order to speed loading and unloading from high-level platforms. High-level platforms were required by the design of the M1 and LIRR carpenters engaged in a speeded up program to build temporary high-level platforms at all stations within electrified territory. All electrified branches became completely equipped with high-level platforms when the final branch, the West Hempstead Branch, was completed in 1973. A total of 53 new high-level platforms were constructed at 38 stations in electric territory that originally had low platforms. Ultimately, they were replaced by permanent concrete platforms at a slower pace.

By the mid-1970s the M1s comprised the entire electric fleet, supplemented by 174 new M3 cars between 1985 and 1986. The newer, postwar single-level electric MU cars were converted to operate behind diesels, joining the postwar diesel-hauled coaches already in that service whose HVAC systems were converted from steam heating to head-end power (HEP). A modified type of push-pull operation was introduced to the diesel trains, using retired first-generation freight diesels from other railroads (mostly ALCO FAs) converted into control units capable only of HEP generation and controlling the locomotive at the other end of the train. The first 16 control cabs were created by GE using the last 16 Alco-GE FA-1 and FA-2 units in existence, all of which had been traded in to GE by the last four railroads to operate them: the Penn Central, Louisville & Nashville, Spokane, Portland and Seattle, and Western Maryland. Many of these units survive today in rail museums. New diesels for general use were purchased to replace the LIRR's ALCO Century 420s and other diesels, in the form of GP38-2s and MP15ACs. The latter switchers were innovatively used as "pull-pull" pairs on each end of short off-peak trains on the Oyster Bay Branch and the Greenport shuttle, whereby the leading unit would provide the motive power, and the trailing unit would supply the train with HEP, the process being reversed at the terminal. By 1973, the LIRR had a completely air-conditioned fleet.

Two more electrification projects were undertaken under state ownership. Third rail electrification was extended on the Main Line and Port Jefferson Branch from Mineola to Hicksville and Huntington on October 19, 1970, after being started in 1968. This was the first time in 43 years that electrified service was extended to previously non-third rail territory. The Main Line beyond Hicksville (where the Port Jefferson Branch splits) to Ronkonkoma (also known as the Ronkonkoma Branch) was fully electrified in December 1987, however, in 1987 there was interim electric service to Farmingdale. The improvement extended electrified service a full 50 miles east of Manhattan to Suffolk County's central corridor communities of Wyandanch, Deer Park, Brentwood, Central Islip, and Ronkonkoma. New electric service was also added to two station in Nassau County; Bethpage and Farmingdale. Peak period running times between Ronkonkoma and Penn Station were reduced to 60 minutes from 93 minutes. This time savings led to an increase in ridership on the Ronkonkoma Branch. In 2007, ridership on the branch had increased from 6,200 to 16,000 passenger trips every day, equaling a 150 percent increase. The Ronkonkoma Branch then became the second largest branch in total ridership after the Babylon Branch. In 1985, a second electrified track was built between Syosset and Huntington on the Port Jefferson Branch in order to eliminate a single track bottleneck. This helped boost ridership on the branch. Further extensions of electrification (to stations such as Port Jefferson, Yaphank, Patchogue or Speonk) have been seriously considered from time to time, though no electrification projects have committed funding as of 2023.

In 1980, a monthly to Huntington from Penn cost $80, but by 1981, it had risen to $102.75 (equivalent to $364 in 2025). The Long Island Rail Road celebrated its 150th anniversary in 1984.

In June 1987, a new storage yard, the West Side Yard, was opened. The yard was built as a result of train capacity issues at Penn Station that forced terminating LIRR trains to make unneeded non-passenger trips to storage yards on Long Island during midday. The West Side Yard, once opened, immediately increased train capacity through Penn Station. The yard is located between West 30th Street, West 33rd Street, 10th Avenue, and 12th Avenue, and it was previously used as a rail yard and freight terminal for the New York Central and later on the Penn Central until the 1970s. The yard was bought by the LIRR in 1980 and it built a new 30-track yard with a tunnel connection to Penn Station. The new yard permitted midday and overnight storage and the cleaning and inspection of 320 cars, which formerly had to be shuttled to yard locations at Jamaica or as far east as Babylon. The West Side Yard is named after John D. Caemmerer, a New York State Senator from East Williston who helped obtain $195.7 million for its construction. A state-of-the-art repair facility at Hillside was opened in 1989, exactly 100 years after the Morris Park shops opened, at a cost of $380 million.

In February 1988, the LIRR forbade smoking on its trains, as well as in all enclosed station areas. During this time frame, wooden track ties on the Main Line, as well as other major lines, were replaced with new concrete ties. Major upgrades to signals and interlockings were done as part of bigger projects that provided electrification extensions or new main line tracks.

Major grade crossing elimination carried on through the 1970s, until the goal of a crossing-free Babylon Branch was finally achieved at Massapequa Park on December 13, 1980, when the station was elevated. This grade-crossing elimination project on the Babylon Branch had started in 1950, with this grade crossing elimination project completing it. Selected single crossing eliminations have been undertaken since then. One such grade-crossing elimination was at Herricks Road in Mineola. On March 14, 1982, a car with ten teenagers was struck at this grade crossing, when the car did not stop at the crossing and nine of them were killed. On April 28, 1998, a railroad bridge over Herricks Road opened. The grade crossing was labeled as the most hazardous in the United States by the National Transportation Safety Board, and 20,000 cars every day crossed the tracks where 200 trains passed. The project took five years to build and it cost $85 million. The work was fully completed a year later when the rail overpass was widened to accommodate a third track.

A former logo used by the MTA

=== 1990s–2000s: Penn Station, bilevels and dual-modes, and M7s ===
Under Governor Mario Cuomo, the LIRR remodeled its lower level concourse of Penn Station between 1990 and 1994, increasing the ceiling height and making it less dreary, as well as opening two new entrance/exit corridors spanning various tracks and lengthening some platforms. The LIRR also added air conditioning, which was not in the original Penn Station.

On December 7, 1993, six people were killed and 19 others injured in a mass shooting on a train near Merillon Avenue station. LIRR workers went on strike on June 17, 1994, after several labor unions and the MTA failed to come to an agreement on contracts after two years. The strike ended after two days.

A 25-year decline in freight on Long Island led to the MTA franchising the LIRR's freight operations to the New York and Atlantic Railway, a subsidiary of the Anacostia & Pacific, on May 11, 1997. The MTA had decided that having an outside company might help bring back freight traffic, and it decided that the transfer would allow the LIRR to focus more on its passenger service.

More capital improvement projects took place during the late 1990s. In 1998, the railroad began to replace its aging diesel and parlor car fleet, which dated from the 1940s and 1950s, by purchasing new bi-level coaches. In doing so the railroad also began to install completely ADA-accessible high-level platforms at the rest of its stations. Urbahn Associates and Daniel Frankfurt designed high-level platforms for 35 stations that contained only low-level platforms. Some of these stations were closed rather than upgraded due to low patronage. On March 16, 1998, the LIRR closed ten stops with low ridership rather than modify them for access for people with disabilities and to accommodate the new trains consisting of double-decker C3 coaches. Five stations were on the Lower Montauk Branch (Glendale, Penny Bridge, Haberman, Fresh Pond and Richmond Hill), and five others were in Nassau and Suffolk Counties (Holtsville, Mill Neck, Center Moriches, Quogue, and Southampton Campus). The stations in Nassau and Suffolk had between 12 and 20 passengers per day, while the stations on the Lower Montauk had daily ridership between 1 and 5 passengers. Trains to Long Island City continued to operate via the Lower Montauk, but instead bypassed the stations. The trains to Long Island City ran via the Lower Montauk until November 12, 2012, when control of the Lower Montauk was fully passed to the New York and Atlantic, which has subsequently used the line exclusively for freight operation. In order to keep the Lower Montauk in service, the LIRR would have had to install the expensive Positive Train Control systems along the entire length of the Lower Montauk for just one train a day. As a result, the LIRR decided that it was not worth the expense and just shifted the one passenger train to the Main Line instead. The NY&A downgraded the branch to a secondary track.

The railroad also purchased new EMD DE30AC and DM30AC – respectively diesel and dual-mode diesel-electric – locomotives capable of providing push-pull service with the bilevels. In October 2002, a total of 836 Bombardier-built M7 cars began to replace the entire M1 fleet. By the end of 2006, the M7s completely replaced the aging M1 fleet. The M7s were better at operating during snowstorms than their predecessors.

The MTA had announced in October 2002 that it had planned to merge the LIRR and the Metro-North Railroad into a new entity, to be called MTA Rail Road, a merger which required approval by the New York Legislature. It was announced in 2007, however, that the planned merger was rejected and will not be further pursued.

In 2006, an 18-year-old woman died at the Woodside station after falling into the gap between the platform and train, and subsequently getting hit by an oncoming passenger train. The death resulted in the LIRR and Metro-North Railroad implementing an aggressive platform gap mitigation platform conductor personnel, and "Watch the gap" programs.

On June 4, 2007, MTA announced the appointment of Helena Williams to the position of President of the LIRR. Williams succeeded Raymond P. Kenny, the interim President who had held the office since James J. Dermody stepped down in September 2006. Williams's promotion marks the first time this position has been held by a woman.

The Long Island Rail Road celebrated its 175th anniversary on April 22, 2009, with a trip on the TC82 inspection car from Brooklyn to Greenport, the original LIRR main line. The train stopped along the way to pick up proclamations from county executives in Nassau and Suffolk counties.

=== 2010s–present: Expansions and Hurricane Sandy ===
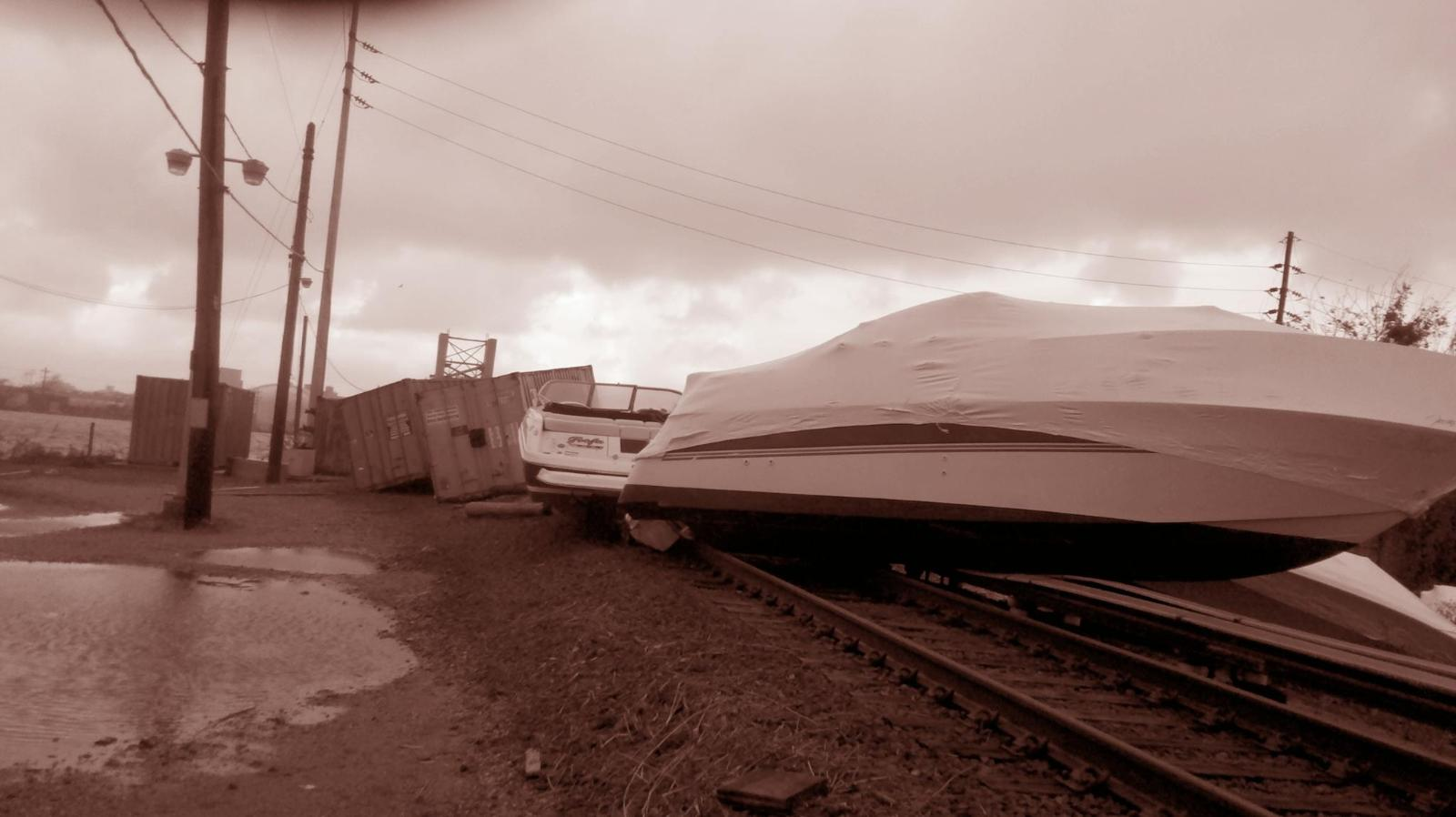
Boats, containers and other items washed onto the Long Beach Branch by Hurricane Sandy just south of Island Park station.

In 2007, the LIRR began work on East Side Access, a project to build a new branch off the Main Line in Queens that would terminate at a new station under Grand Central Terminal. At the time, Penn Station was operating at capacity due to a complex track interlocking and limited capacity in the East River Tunnels. The project has been delayed repeatedly, and is among the most expensive projects of its type in the world. As of April 2018, the project was expected to cost $11.1 billion. East Side Access opened for limited shuttle service to and from Jamaica station on January 25, 2023, with full service beginning on February 27, 2023.

As part of East Side Access, five "readiness projects" were also completed to increase peak-hour capacity across the LIRR system in preparation for expanded peak-hour service after the completion of East Side Access. Together, they cost $495 million. The projects included adding a new platform at Jamaica station for trains to and from Atlantic Terminal; adding storage tracks near Massapequa station and Great Neck station; and expanding the Port Washington Yard near Port Washington station and the Ronkonkoma Yard adjacent to Ronkonkoma station.

In 2012, the LIRR started work on constructing a second track along the Ronkonkoma Branch between Farmingdale and Ronkonkoma stations. Before the start of the project, the largely single-track Ronkonkoma Branch limited train capacity to one train per hour in each direction. The entire project cost $387.2 million and was completed in September 2018.

The LIRR was severely affected by Hurricane Sandy in 2012. In anticipation of the storm, the LIRR was shut down on October 29, 2012, and the railroad moved trains out of low-lying areas such as the West Side Yard. As a result of the storm's record breaking storm surge, many parts of the system were inundated with water, including the East River Tunnels, the West Side Yard, and the Long Beach Branch. It took the railroad seven weeks to restore full rush hour service. In the late 2010s, the LIRR began work on projects to replace components on the Long Beach Branch and West Side Yard that had been damaged during Hurricane Sandy. However, as of October 2018, the Long Beach Branch and West Side Yard projects had not been completed, and the replacement of the East River Tunnels has not started.

On January 4, 2017, a train derailed at Atlantic Terminal, injuring 103 passengers. On March 23, 2018, a Ronkonkoma Branch train heading towards Penn Station struck a car that drove the tracks from a GPS at Mineola station, no injuries are reported. On February 26, 2019, a Ronkonkoma Branch train headed for Penn Station struck a truck and derailed, damaging the platform at the Westbury station and killing all three occupants of the truck.

To accommodate an expected increase in Long Island Rail Road ridership once the East Side Access is completed, the LIRR planned to build a third Main Line track from Floral Park to Hicksville. This would include purchasing properties in the track's right of way, eliminating grade crossings (in conjunction with New York State Department of Transportation), relocating existing stations, and reconfiguring Mineola station. The project was delayed several times, but in January 2016, Governor Andrew Cuomo announced a transportation improvement plan which included several million dollars in funding to restart third track development. A groundbreaking ceremony for the third track project was held on September 5, 2018. The project cost $1.8 billion. The third track opened in several phases and was completed by October 2022.

In July 2019, plans to open a new station on the Main Line at Elmont were announced. The station is the first entirely new LIRR station built in over 40 years and is intended to primarily service the recently opened UBS Arena and the Elmont neighborhood. The station was opened in three phases. The eastbound platform opened for event days only on November 20, 2021,. the westbound platform opened on October 6, 2022, also for event days only, and then finally full service was initiated on February 27, 2023. A month earlier, on January 25, 2023, Grand Central Madison was officially opened as work on its east side access concluded after 15 years. Limited shuttle service to Jamaica initially served the station. Full service at the station began on February 27, 2023, with trains continuing beyond Jamaica to most branches.

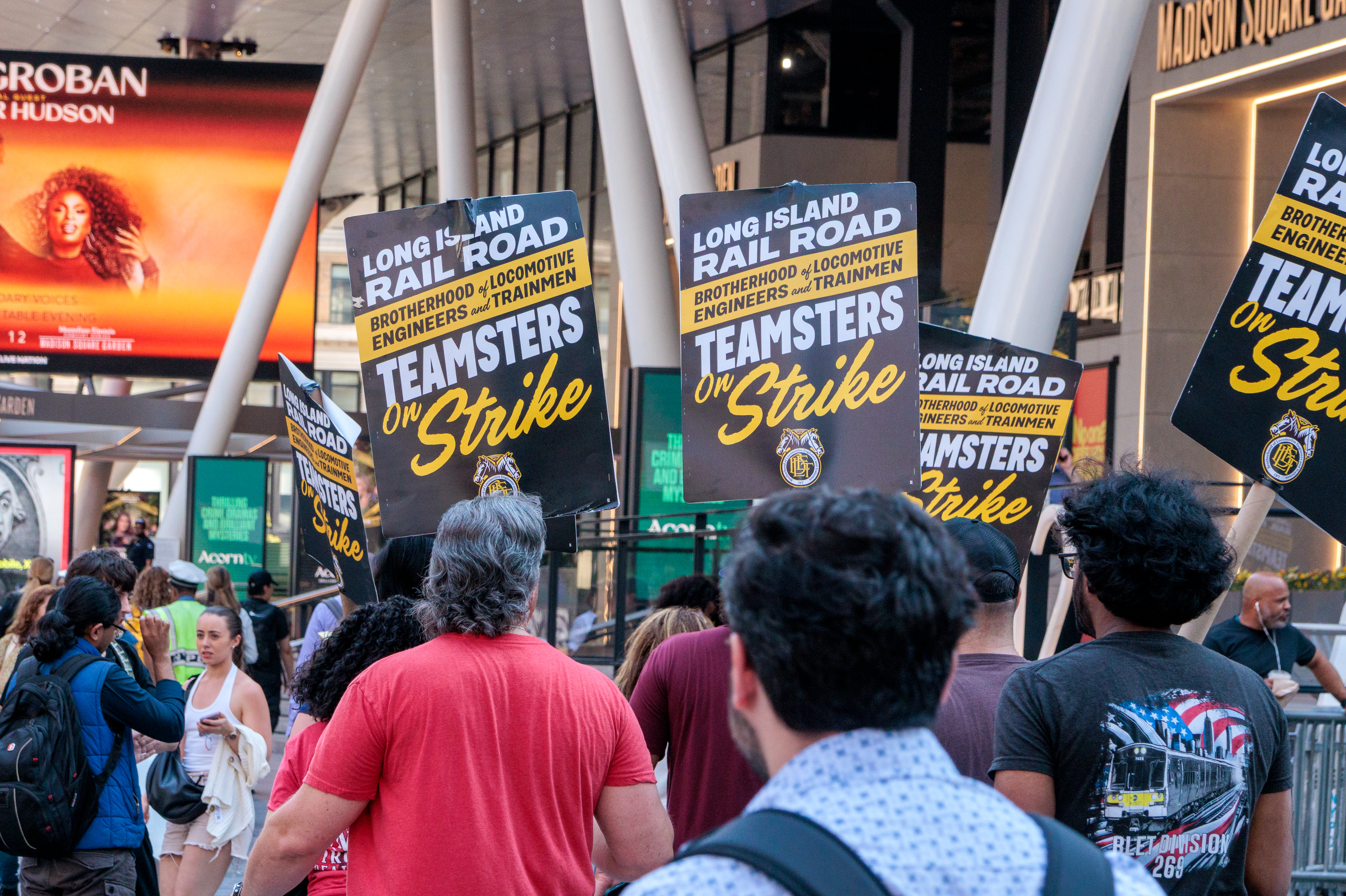
Union picket line members at Penn Station in May 2026

On May 16, 2026, 3,500 workers across five unions, including the Brotherhood of Locomotive Engineers and Trainmen, went on strike for the first time since 1994. The strike shut down the entire system and impacted over 250,000 riders, forcing them to find alternative transportation. Workers were asking for a 5% pay increase in 2026 and were unable to reach an agreement before the strike deadline. The strike followed several years of discussions with the MTA and a vote to strike on September 15, 2025 that required a 6-month negotiation period and 60-day cooldown period beforehand. A contingency transportation plan was put in place to provide alternative service using shuttle buses between Subway stations at Howard Beach–JFK Airport station and Jamaica–179th Street station to 6 stations on Long Island, including Bay Shore, Lakeview, Hicksville, Huntington, Mineola, and Ronkonkoma. However, the shuttle buses did not begin operating until Monday following the weekend and were not sufficient for fully serving the railroad's ridership. Riders were also advised to utilize Nassau Inter-County Express bus service or drive and park at Citi Field as other alternatives. Governor Hochul suggested that daily commuters try their best to work from home in order to relieve congestion. Commutes and transportation between New York City and Long Island took over an hour longer than expected due to the strike. The strike ended after three days, with the MTA giving workers a 4.5% raise and extending their contract by 6 weeks.

== See also ==
- List of former Long Island Rail Road lines
- Long Island Rail Road fleet
- List of presidents and trustees of the Long Island Rail Road
- 1993 Long Island Rail Road shooting
- Montauk land claim
