= Center Moriches station =

Former train station in New York, US

Center Moriches
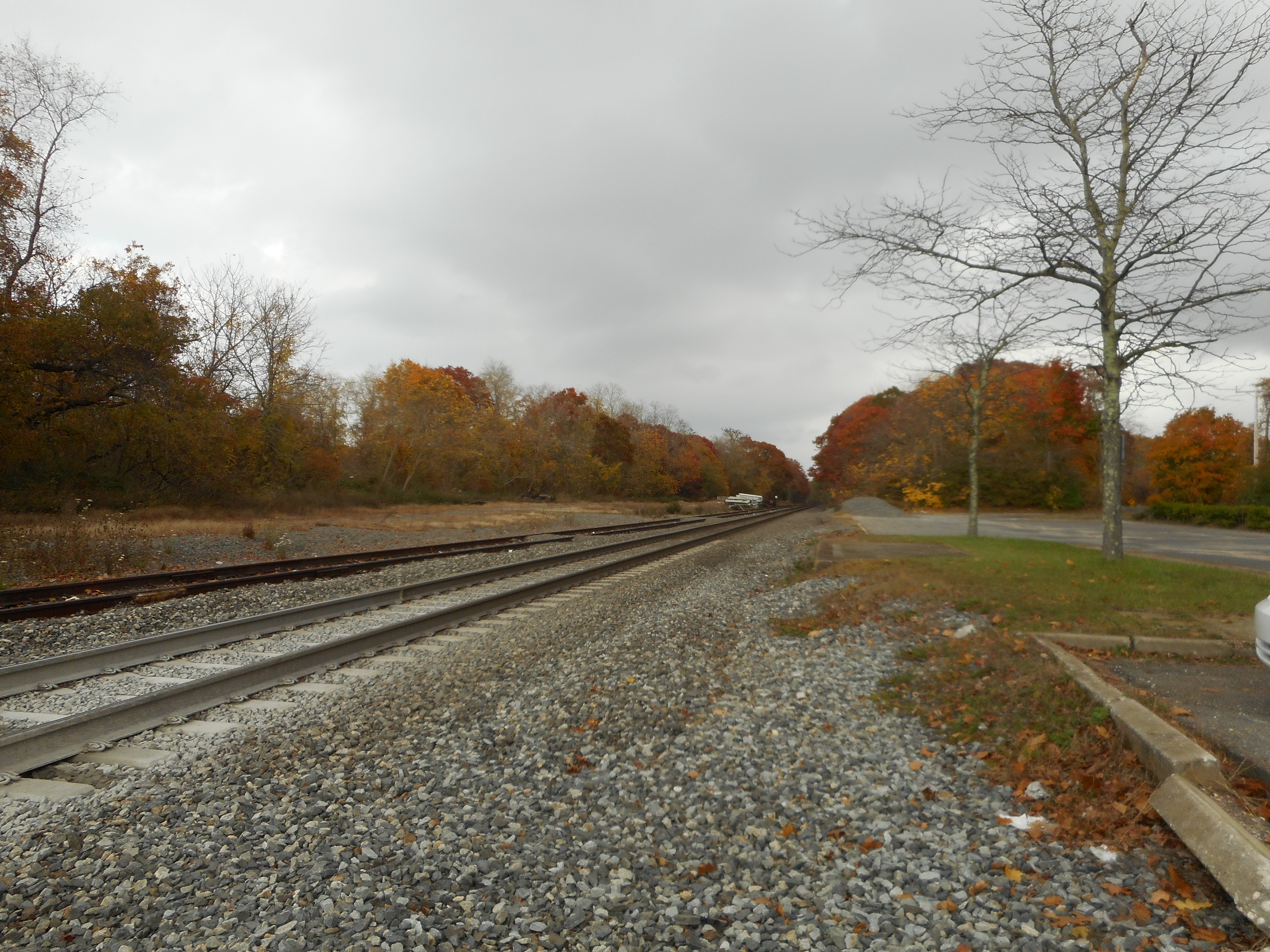
- Looking east at the former Center Moriches LIRR station

General information
- Location: Railroad Avenue and Hamilton Street; Center Moriches, New York
- Coordinates: 40°48′17.4″N 72°47′22.4″W
- Owner: Long Island Rail Road
- Platforms: 1 side platform
- Tracks: 2

History
- Opened: 1881
- Closed: March 15, 1998
- Former names: Moriches (1881-????)

Former services
Preceding station	Long Island Rail Road	Following station
Mastic toward Long Island City	Montauk Branch	East Moriches toward Montauk
Location

Center Moriches (/moʊˈrɪtʃɪz/ moh-RITCH-iz) was a station stop along the Montauk Branch of the Long Island Rail Road. It was located on Railroad Avenue and Hamilton Street in Center Moriches, New York.

== History ==
The station was built by the Brooklyn and Montauk Railroad, around 1881 as "Moriches Station" after the original Moriches station was renamed for the geographically correct Eastport, New York. At some point the station was renamed as well for the more geographically correct Center Moriches, New York. Until 1906, it was also a terminal with a wye, a small yard, and a transfer point for one of the east end scoots. When East Moriches and Eastport stations were closed by the Long Island Rail Road on October 6, 1958, commuters who used those stations were advised to use Center Moriches station, thus transforming it into the last railroad station in the Moricheses. The station house was razed in 1964, but a new shelter was built sometime around 1985. The station closed on March 16, 1998; at the time, it only served 5 passengers per day. The arrival of the C3 bi-level coaches meant that all stations in the LIRR's diesel territory had to receive high-level platforms, and building new platforms for such a low-usage station was not cost-effective.
