= List of presidents and trustees of the Long Island Rail Road =

- Knowles Taylor: 1835-1837
- Valentine Hicks: 1837-1838
- Waldron B. Post: 1838-1839
- George B. Fisk: 1839-1847
- James H. Weeks: 1847-1850
- Isaac E. Haviland: 1850-1851
- Moses Maynard, Jr.: 1851-1852
- Isaac E. Haviland: 1852-1853
- William E. Morris: 1853-1862
- Coffin Colket: 1862-1863
- Oliver Charlick: 1863-1875
- Henry Havemeyer: 1875-1876
- Conrad Poppenhusen: 1876
- David N. Ropes: 1876-1877
- Adolph Poppenhusen: 1877
- Thomas R. Sharp: 1877-1881
- Austin Corbin: 1881-1896
- William H. Baldwin: 1896-1905
- William F. Potter: 1905
- Ralph Peters: 1905-1923
- Samuel Rea: 1923-1928

The LIRR was operated by the Pennsylvania Railroad from 1928 to 1949. The people from Smucker and Delatour through Wyer were trustees rather than presidents, as the LIRR was in Chapter 77 bankruptcy.

- David E. Smucker and H.L. Delatour: 1949-1950
- William H. Draper: 1950-1951
- William Wyer: 1951-1954
- Walter S. Franklin: 1954-1955
- Thomas M. Goodfellow: 1955-1967
- Frank Aikman, Jr.: 1967-1969
- Walter L. Schlager, Jr.: 1969-1976
- Robert K. Pattison: 1976-1978
- Francis S. Gabreski: 1978-1981
- Daniel T. Scannell: 1981
- Robin H.H. Wilson: 1981-1985
- Bruce C. McIver: 1985-1989
- Charles W. Hoppe: 1990-1994
- Thomas F. Prendergast: 1994-2000
- Kenneth J. Bauer: 2000-2003
- James J. Dermody: 2003-2006
- Raymond P. Kenny (acting): 2006-2007
- Helena Williams: 2007-2014
- Patrick Nowakowski: 2014-2018
- Phillip Eng: 2018-2022
- Catherine Rinaldi (interim): 2022-2023
- Robert Free: 2023-present
