= Eastport station =

Former train station in New York, US

Eastport
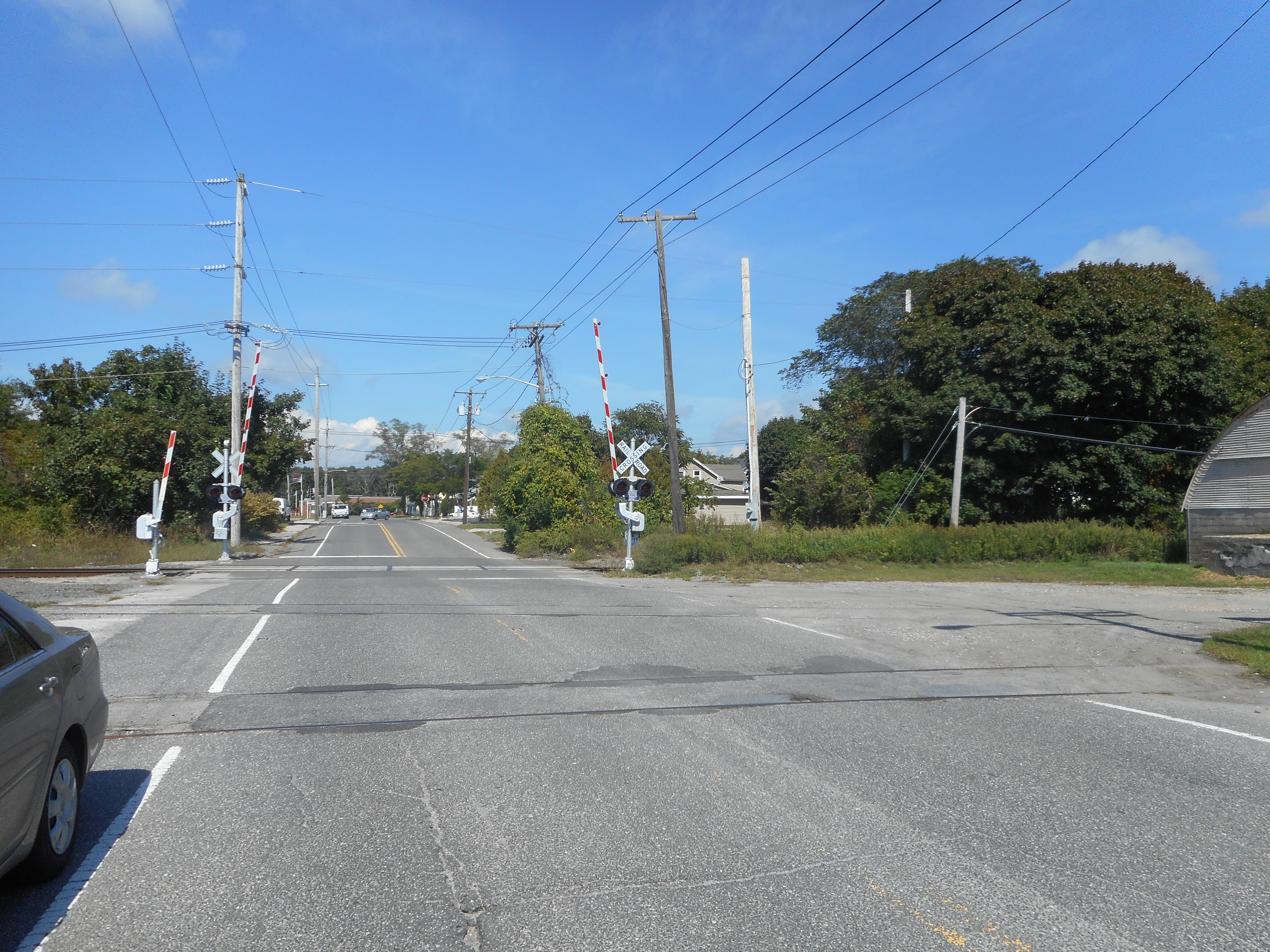
- The former Eastport LIRR station site on the northwest corner of this grade crossing.

General information
- Location: Montauk Highway and East Moriches Boulevard; Eastport, New York
- Coordinates: 40.826735°N 72.742656°W (as "Moriches" 1870-1881); 40.825436°N 72.731938°W (as "Eastport" 1881-1958)
- Owner: Long Island Rail Road

History
- Opened: March 1870
- Closed: October 6, 1958
- Former names: Moriches (1870–1881)

Former services
Preceding station	Long Island Rail Road	Following station
East Moriches toward Long Island City	Montauk Division	Speonk toward Montauk
Manorville Terminus	Sag Harbor Branch	Speonk toward Sag Harbor
Location

Eastport was a railroad station built on the former Manorville Branch of the Long Island Rail Road in Eastport, New York. It was opened in 1870 and closed in 1958. It was the easternmost station along both branches in the Town of Brookhaven.

== History ==
Originally named "Moriches station" for the nearby towns of Moriches, Center Moriches and East Moriches, despite being located east of the Moricheses, the station was built in March 1870 on the southeast corner of the at-grade crossing of Montauk Highway for what was then the Sag Harbor Branch of the Long Island Rail Road. The Sag Harbor Branch was built by Oliver Charlick to prevent the South Side Railroad of Long Island from extending east of Patchogue.

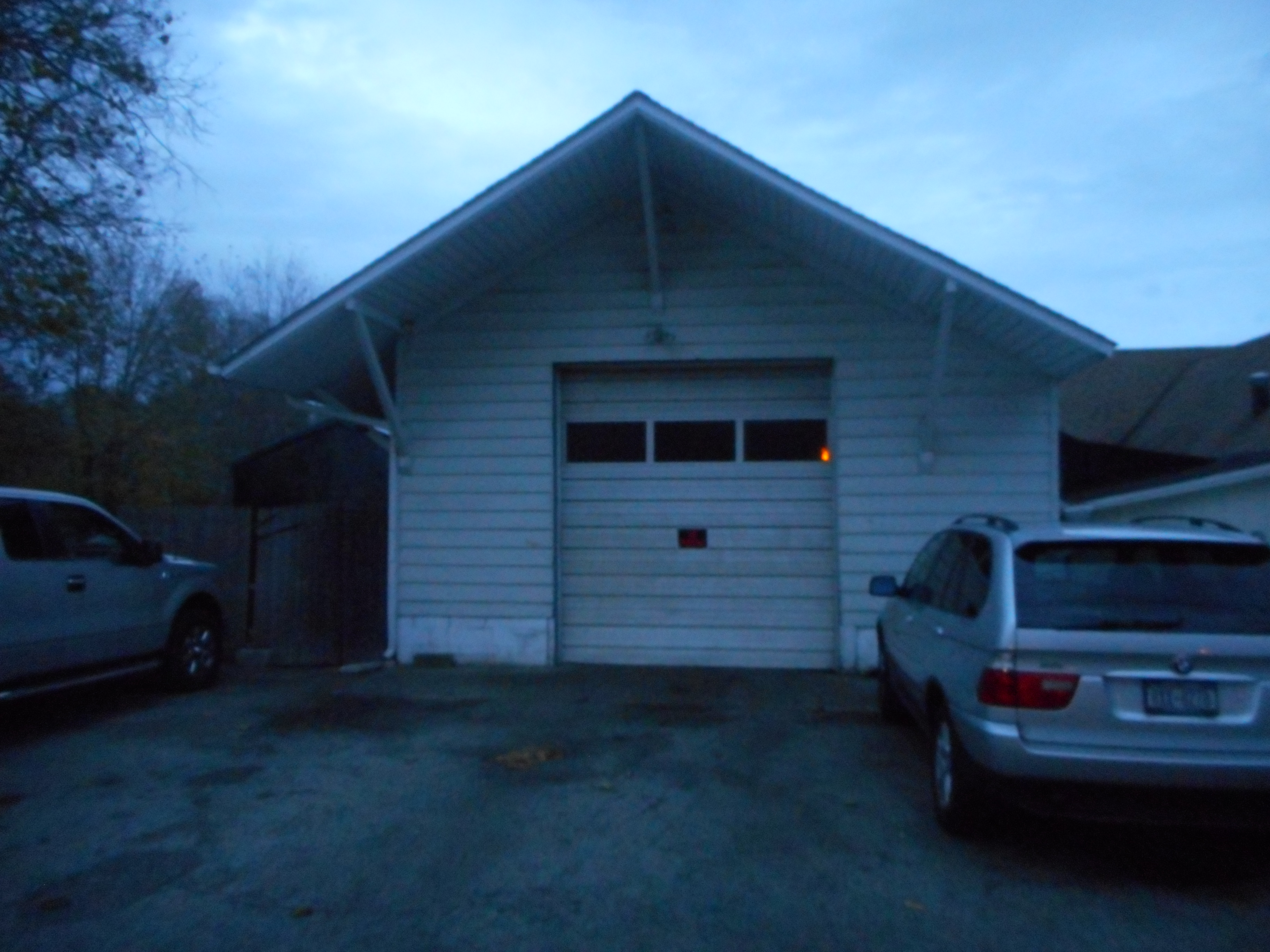
The former station house was moved behind a gas station off of Montauk Highway and converted into a garage bay.

The former South Side Railroad of Long Island main line was extended to Eastport Station on July 27, 1881 after eventual acquisition by the LIRR. On October 18 of that year, it was moved to the southwest corner of Montauk Highway and East Moriches Road (now Boulevard), and renamed "Eastport." It also included a wye between eastbound and westbound trains that went over a bridge over Montauk Highway. When the Montauk Extension was finally built east of Bridgehampton station, Eastport station officially became the hub of the Manorville Branch and Montauk Branch. From 1916–1938, the junction of these two lines contained the PT Cabins.

The west leg of the wye to the Manorville Branch was abandoned in 1931. The PT Cabins were replaced by automated switches and signals. The branch itself was abandoned in 1949. Along with East Moriches station just southwest of here, Eastport station was closed by the LIRR on October 6, 1958, and was moved to a private location after 1963 behind a gas station on Montauk Highway where it has been converted into a garage bay, per Dave Keller, LIRR Historian.
