= Shinnecock Hills =

Shinnecock Hills can refer to:

- Shinnecock Hills, New York, a hamlet in the Town of Southampton.
- Shinnecock Hills Golf Club, a golf club in the hamlet.
- Shinnecock Hills station, former Long Island Rail Road station in service from 1887 to 1938.
- Southampton College station, former Long Island Rail Road station temporarily reopened as Shinnecock Hills for U.S. Open golf events.

== See also ==
- Shinnecock (disambiguation)
