= Westhampton station =

Long Island Rail Road station in Suffolk County, New York

Westhampton
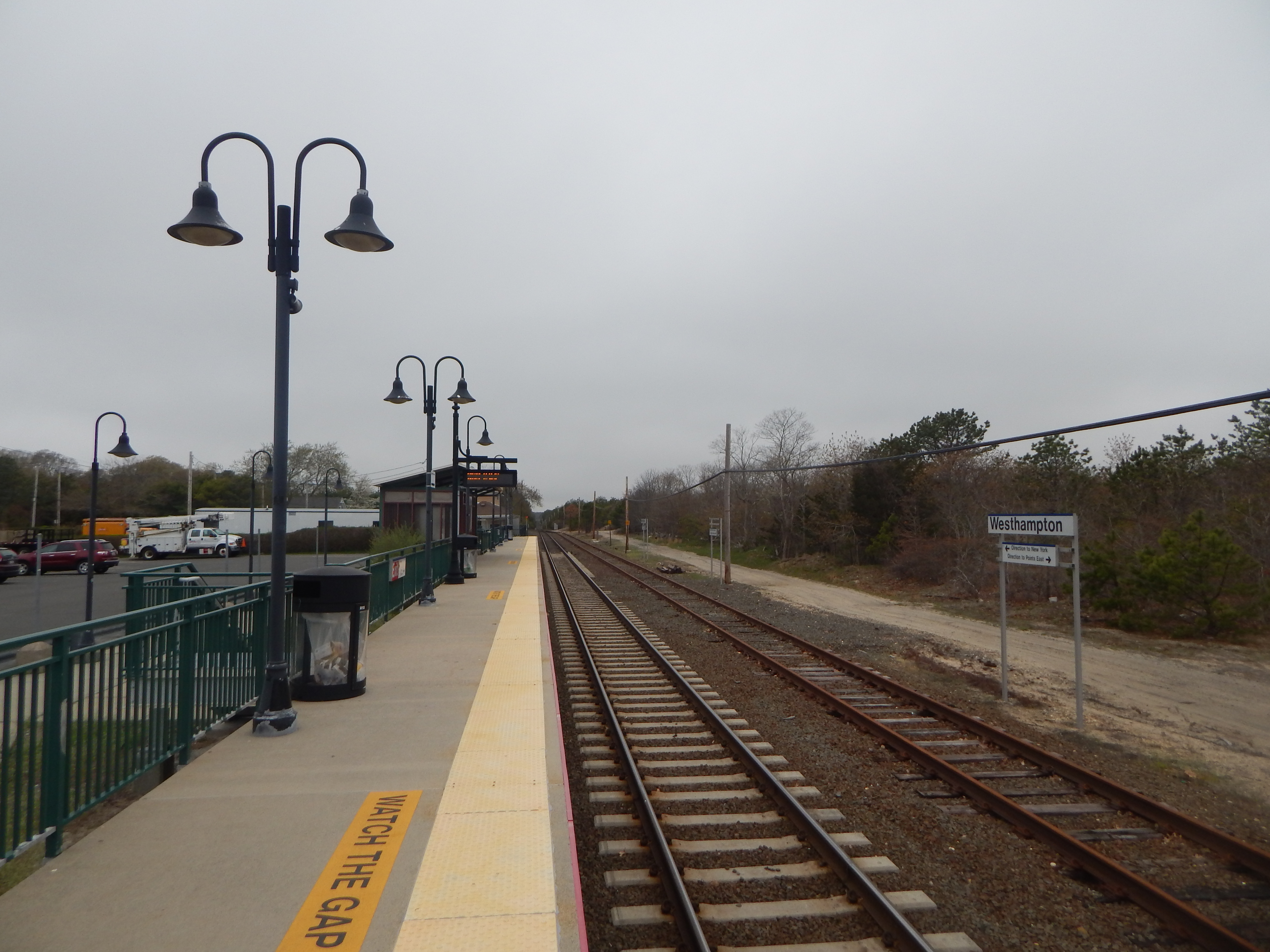
- The Westhampton station, as seen in 2015

General information
- Location: Station Road & Depot Road; Westhampton, New York
- Coordinates: 40.830191°N 72.650973°W
- Owner: Long Island Rail Road
- Platforms: 1 side platform
- Tracks: 2

Construction
- Parking: Yes
- Accessible: Yes

Other information
- Station code: WHN
- Fare zone: 14

History
- Opened: 1869
- Rebuilt: 1905

Passengers
- 2012–2014: 27 per weekday
- Rank: 120 of 125

Services
Preceding station	Long Island Rail Road	Following station
Speonk toward Penn Station or Long Island City	Montauk Branch limited service	Hampton Bays toward Montauk
Jamaica toward Penn Station	Cannonball summers only	Southampton toward Montauk
Jamaica toward Penn Station	Cannonball summers only	Hampton Bays One-way operation
Former services
Preceding station	Long Island Rail Road	Following station
Speonk toward Long Island City	Montauk Division	Quogue toward Montauk
Speonk toward Manorville	Sag Harbor Branch	Quogue toward Sag Harbor
Location

Westhampton is a station along the Montauk Branch of the Long Island Rail Road. It is on Station Road and Depot Road in Westhampton, New York, just west of Old Riverhead Road and south of the Francis S. Gabreski Airport.

== History ==
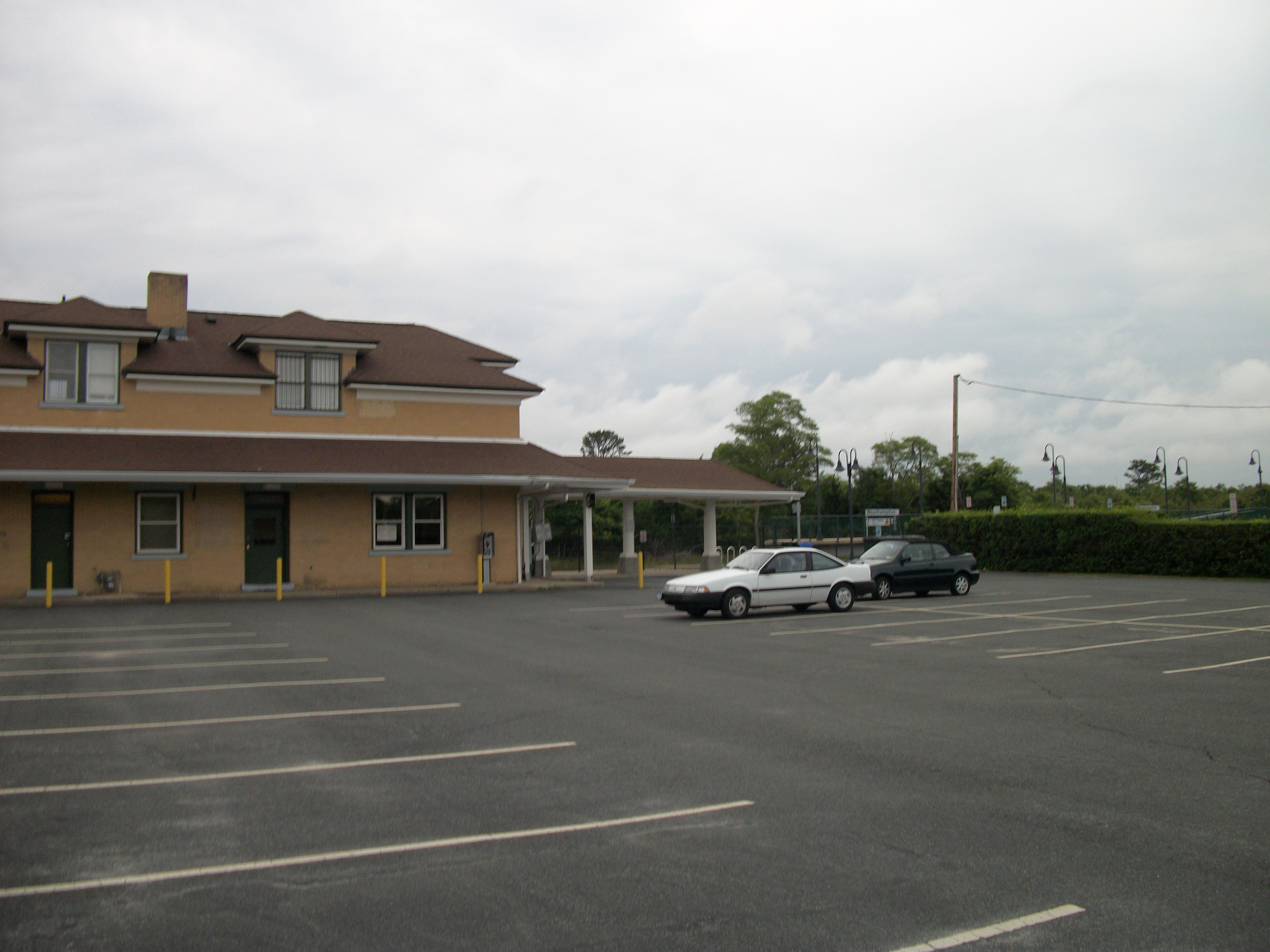
The rebuilt station house at Westhampton

The Westhampton station was originally built in 1869 along what was then the Sag Harbor Branch. In 1905, a second station was built when the first one was moved to a private location.

The station burned down in 1986, but was subsequently rebuilt sometime between then and the year 2000. When Quogue station was closed on March 16, 1998, Westhampton was one of the two stations that replaced it. The other was Hampton Bays.

== Station layout ==
The station has one eight-car-long high-level side platform on the south side of the main track. There is a shelter on the platform. A siding is on the north side of the main track.
