= Shinnecock =

Shinnecock may refer to:

- Shinnecock Indian Nation, a federally-recognized American Indian tribe in the Town of Southampton, New York
- Shinnecock Reservation, the tribe's reservation
- Mohegan-Pequot language or Shinnecock language, an extinct Algonquian language formerly spoken by the Shinnecock
- Shinnecock Canal, a canal that cuts across the South Fork of Long Island at Hampton Bays, New York
- Shinnecock Canal Railroad Bridge, a railroad bridge crossing the Shinnecock Canal
- Shinnecock Inlet, an inlet connecting Shinnecock Bay and the Atlantic Ocean
- Shinnecock Light, a former lighthouse in Hampton Bays, New York; demolished 1948
- Shinnecock Windmill, a windmill dating from c. 1713 currently located on the Stony Brook Southampton campus

Shinnecock may also refer to Shinnecock Hills:

- Shinnecock Hills, New York, a hamlet in the Town of Southampton, New York
- Shinnecock Hills Golf Club, a golf course in the hamlet
- Shinnecock Hills station, former Long Island Rail Road station in service from 1887 to 1938
- Southampton College station, former Long Island Rail Road station temporarily reopened as Shinnecock Hills for U.S. Open golf events
- Shinnecock Hills Summer School of Art, art school directed by William Merritt Chase, operated from 1891 to 1902
