= Hampton Bays station =

Long Island Rail Road station in Suffolk County, New York

Hampton Bays
- The Hampton Bays station in 2026

General information
- Location: Good Ground Road, & Springville Road; Hampton Bays, New York
- Coordinates: 40.876464°N 72.524566°W
- Owner: Long Island Rail Road
- Platforms: 1 side platform
- Tracks: 2
- Connections: Suffolk County Transit: 92 (on Montauk Highway)

Construction
- Parking: Yes (free)
- Cycle facilities: Yes
- Accessible: Yes

Other information
- Station code: HBY
- Fare zone: 14

History
- Opened: 1869
- Closed: 1873, 1958
- Rebuilt: 1874, 1913, 1974, 2000–01, 2026
- Former names: Good Ground (1869–1922)

Passengers
- 2012—2014: 78 per weekday
- Rank: 112 of 125

Services
Preceding station	Long Island Rail Road	Following station
Westhampton toward Penn Station or Long Island City	Montauk Branch limited service	Southampton toward Montauk
Westhampton toward Penn Station	Cannonball summers only	Southampton One-way operation
Former services
Preceding station	Long Island Rail Road	Following station
Quogue toward Long Island City	Montauk Division	Canoe Place toward Montauk
East Quogue toward Manorville	Sag Harbor Branch	Shinnecock Hills toward Sag Harbor
Preceding station	Long Island Rail Road	Following station
Terminus	Montauk Branch	Canoe Place toward Montauk
Location

Hampton Bays is a railroad station along the Montauk Branch of the Long Island Rail Road. It is on Good Ground Road between Springville Road and Suffolk CR 32 (Ponquogue Avenue) in Hampton Bays, New York.

== History ==
The Hampton Bays station was originally built along what was then the Sag Harbor Branch on December 20, 1869 (although some sources claim it was in February 1871) as "Good Ground." It was the terminus of the line until summer 1870, when it was extended to Sag Harbor. The station was renamed "Hampton Bays" in June 1922, but the original name can be found along one of the streets on which it is located. The station burned on November 4, 1873. The second station was opened on January 10, 1874 and closed in 1913, but used as an "express house" for the 3rd depot, which opened in summer 1913. The station house was built in the style typical of stations such as Manhasset, Riverhead, Bay Shore, Northport, and Mineola stations, and closed in 1958, but remained a flag stop, then razed sometime around 1964. The station stop was moved 2,000 feet (610 m) west on December 26, 1974.

When Quogue station was closed on March 16, 1998, Hampton Bays was one of the two stations that replaced it. The other was Westhampton. The existing depot's high-level platforms were added between 1998 and 1999.

In March 2026, construction began on a temporary second platform at the station, with the stated goals of improving operational flexibility on the Montauk Branch – allowing trains to pass each other while stopped at the station – and accommodating crowds for the U.S. Open.

=== Future ===
On August 25, 2026, following the construction of the temporary second platform, Governor Kathy Hochul announced plans to make the station's second platform permanent as part of a broader infrastructure improvement plan for the eastern end of the Montauk Branch. The project will also include track and signal upgrades to extend the existing siding from six to eight cars.

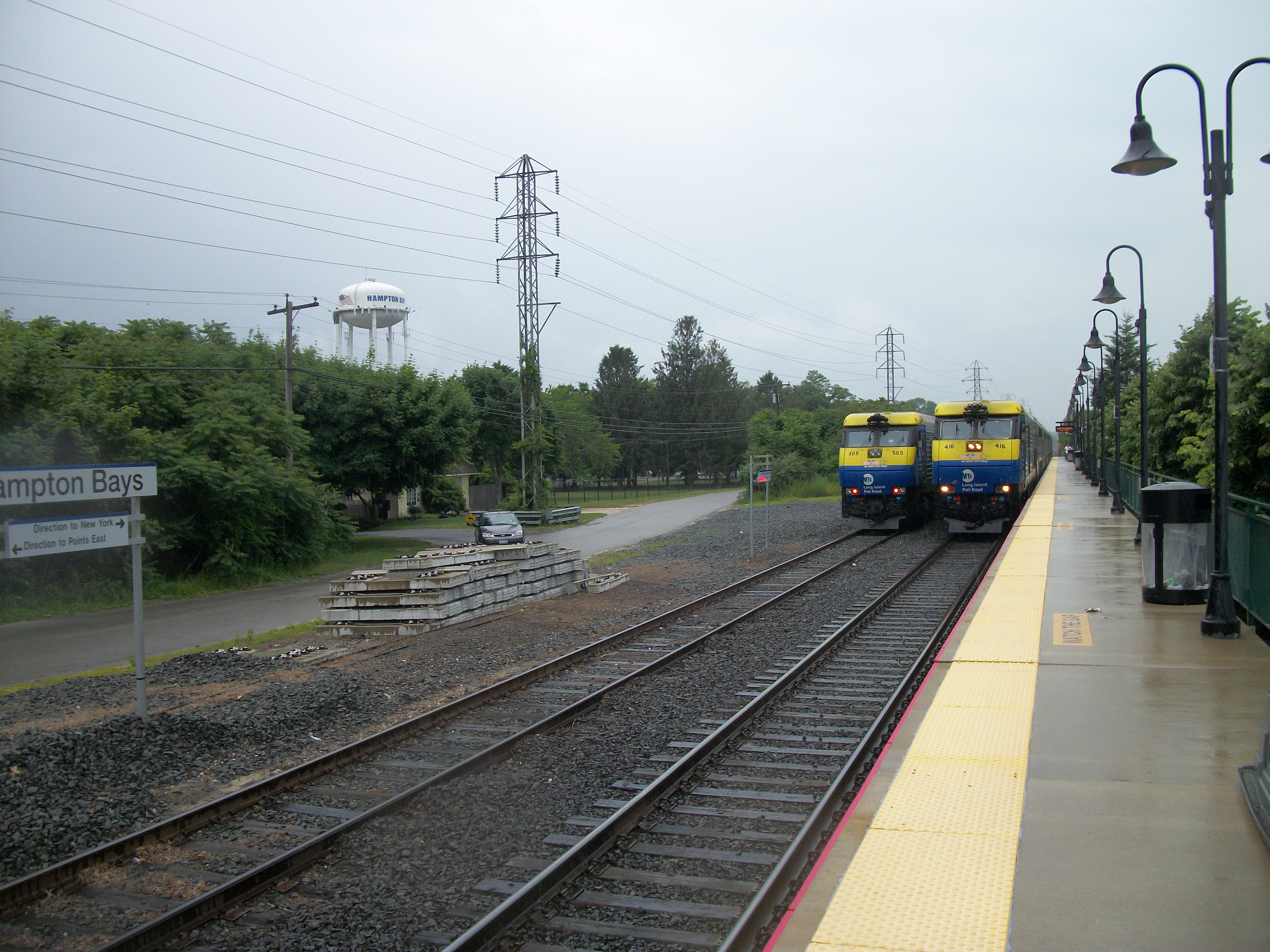
A Montauk-bound train arrives at Hampton Bays Station as it passes an idling train on the next track.

== Station layout ==
The station has one six-car-long high-level side platform on the north side of the main track. A siding is on the south side of the main track.

== See also ==
- List of Long Island Rail Road stations
- Bay Shore station
