= Canoe Place station =

Former train station in New York, US

Canoe Place

General information
- Location: Shinnecock Canal; Canoe Place, New York
- Coordinates: 40.887661°N 72.500762°W
- Owner: Long Island Rail Road (former)

History
- Opened: 1935
- Closed: 1953

Former services
Preceding station	Long Island Rail Road	Following station
Hampton Bays toward Long Island City	Montauk Division	Suffolk Downs toward Montauk
Location

Canoe Place was a station stop along the Montauk Branch of the Long Island Rail Road and first opened as a low cinder platform on the south east side of Shinnecock Canal in 1935. The station was in service for "Fisherman's Special" trains and was closed in 1953. "Fisherman's Special" trains operated from Penn Station to Montauk and provided an intermediate stop at Canoe Place for boats waiting to take anglers out on Peconic Bay. The station was located between Hampton Bays and Suffolk Downs Stations. The hamlet where it was located is now part of Hampton Bays, New York.
