= Sag Harbor (disambiguation) =

Sag Harbor, New York is an incorporated village in Suffolk County, New York, United States.

Sag Harbor may also refer to:

- Sag Harbor (novel), a 2009 novel by Colson Whitehead
- Sag Harbor (play), an 1899 comedy written by James Herne
- "Sag Harbor" (song), a 2025 song by Tyler, the Creator
- Sag Harbor Branch, a former branch of the Long Island Rail Road
- Sag Harbor station, a former station of the Long Island Rail Road
