= Quogue station =

Former train station in New York, US

Quogue
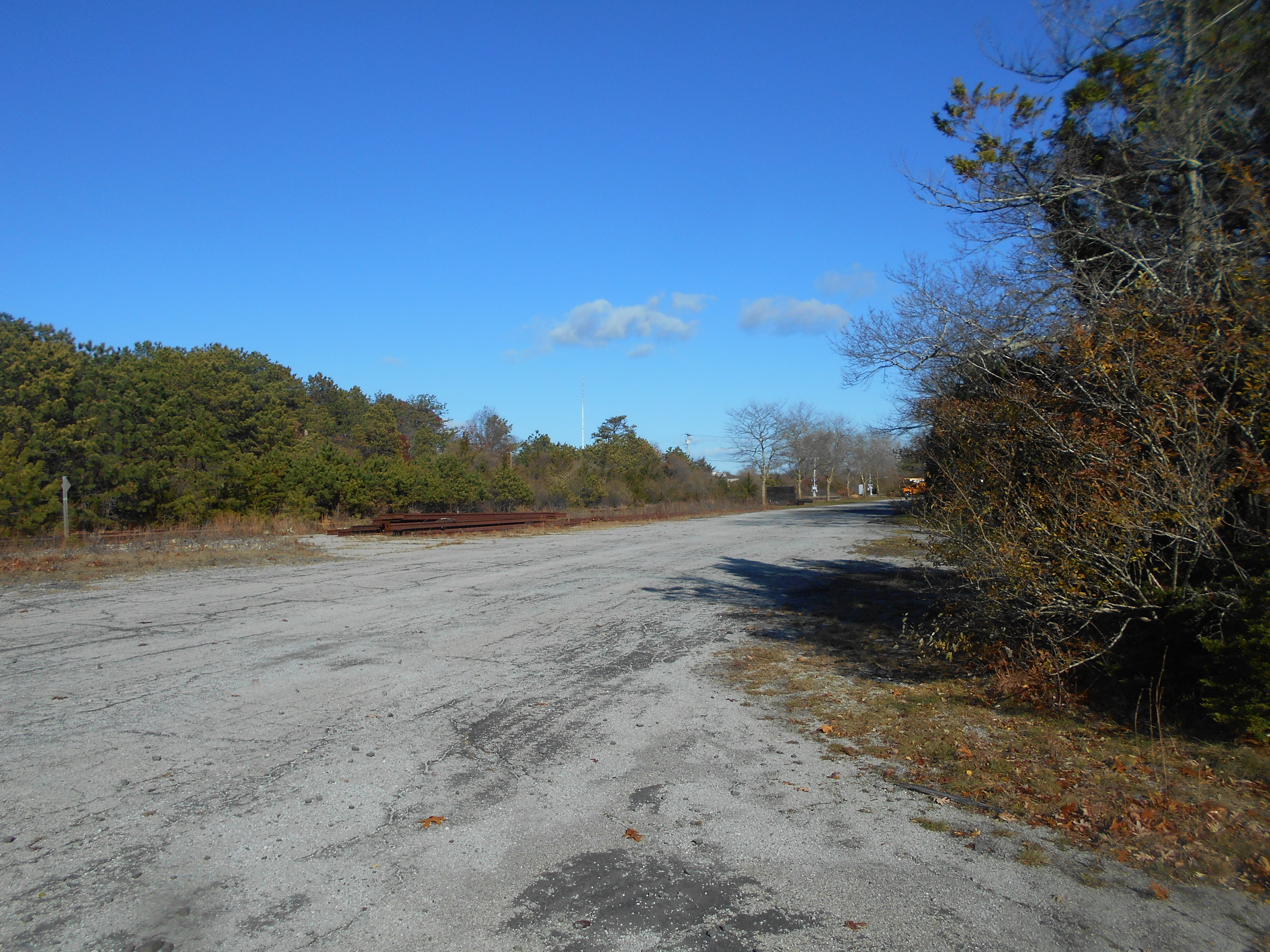
- The Quogue station site in November 2014, sixteen years after service was terminated.

General information
- Location: Station Road, off of Quogue-Riverhead Road; Quogue, New York
- Coordinates: 40°50′17″N 72°36′5″W
- Owner: Long Island Rail Road
- Platforms: 1 side platform
- Tracks: 1

Other information
- Station code: None
- Fare zone: 14

History
- Opened: 1875
- Closed: March 16, 1998

Services
Preceding station	Long Island Rail Road	Following station
Westhampton toward Long Island City	Montauk Branch	Hampton Bays toward Montauk
Preceding station	Long Island Rail Road	Following station
Westhampton toward Manorville	Sag Harbor Branch	East Quogue toward Sag Harbor
Location

Quogue was a railroad station along the Montauk Branch of the Long Island Rail Road, located in Quogue, Suffolk County, New York.

== History ==
The station was built around June, 1875. During construction the station was moved by the village "on a Sunday morning" from its original and current location to a location on Old Depot Road. The second depot was built around 1882 and later was moved to a private location around 1905. The third depot was built around 1905 and at some point was elevated for the bridge over the former New York State Route 113.

The station house was razed around April, 1964 but the station stop itself continued to operate until March 16, 1998. This station, along with nine others around that time were closed due to low ridership, was deemed not cost-effective to rebuild with high-level platforms to support the new C3 railcars the LIRR was procuring at the time.
