= Suffolk Downs (disambiguation) =

Suffolk Downs was horse race track in Boston, Massachusetts.

Suffolk Downs may also refer to:

- Suffolk Downs station, in Boston, Massachusetts, United States
- Suffolk Downs (LIRR station), a former train station in Hampton Bays, New York, United States
- Mildenhall Stadium, known as Suffolk Downs from 2022 to 2025 when staging greyhound racing
