= Boardy Barn =

Bar in Hampton Bays, New York, US

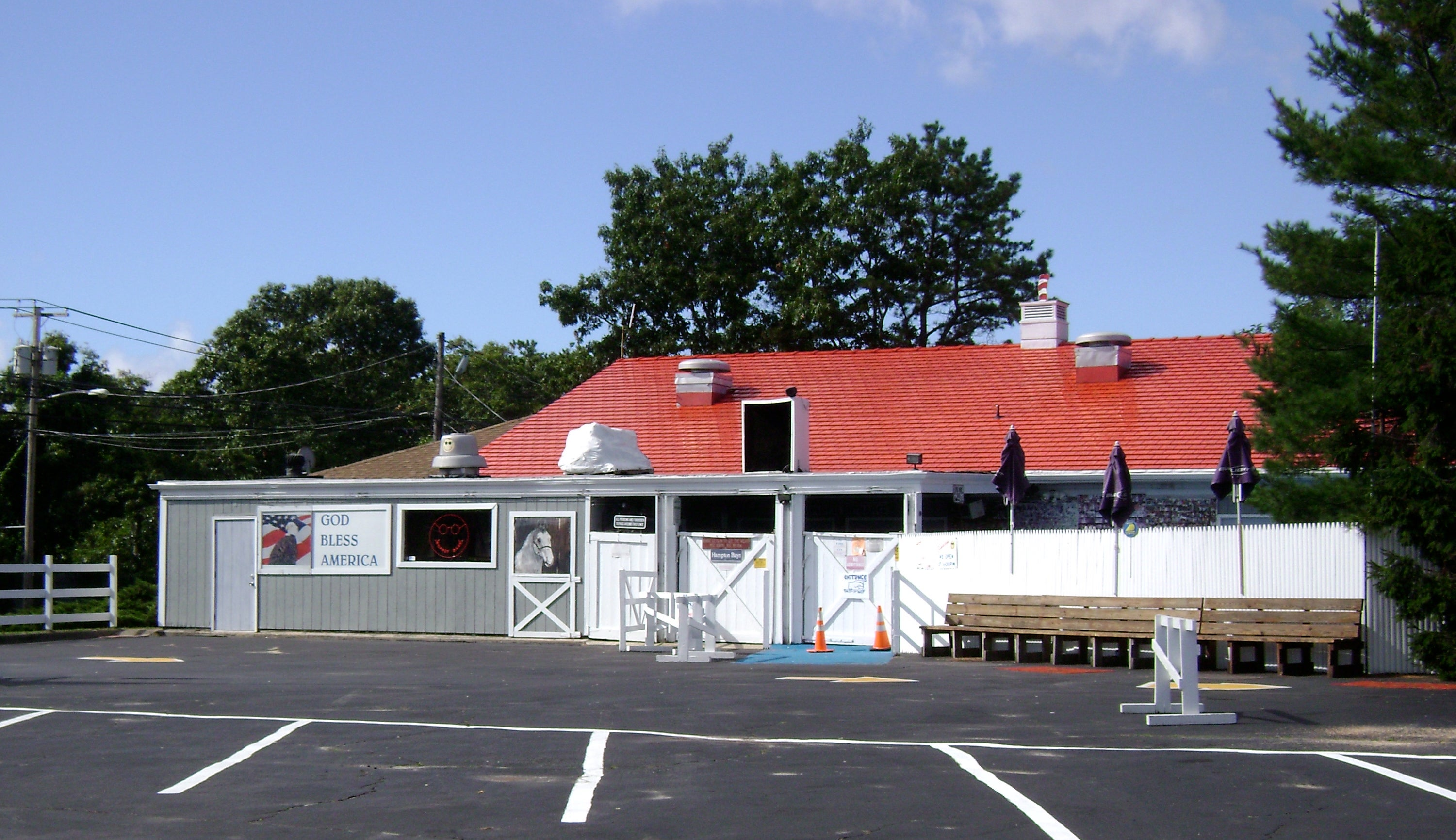
- Bordy Barn circa 2012
- Interactive map of the Boardy Barn area

General information
- Status: Closed
- Location: 270 West Montauk Highway, Hampton Bays, New York, United States
- Coordinates: 40°51′58″N 72°32′59″W
- Opened: April 16, 1970
- Owner: Tony Galgano

Website
- www.boardybarn.com

Boardy Barn was a bar located in The Hamptons in New York from 1970 until 2021. The bar was only open on Sundays in the summer from mid-May to the Sunday after Labor Day during the hours of 2pm to 8pm. Every week, about 2,000 patrons visit the venue's party tent.

Boardy Barn was often celebrated for its upbeat atmosphere and its signature smiley face stickers, and the Miami New Times called it "the happiest place on earth".

The New York Post estimated that on the Sunday before Memorial Day in 2011, Boardy Barn ran through 600 kegs of Budweiser in seven hours. According to Tony Galgano, one of the owners of Boardy Barn, "They say that if we were open year round, we would sell more beer than at Yankee Stadium in a season."

The Boardy Barn closed its Hampton Bays location in 2021; however, The official Boardy Barn now operates at pop-up locations, offering an authentic experience that aims to maintain the spirit of the original Boardy Barn. In 2026, the official Boardy Barn pop-ups are being held at Blue Point Brewing Company in Patchogue. The pop-up locations are expanding in the summer of 2026 to include one Sunday in July at Flynn's Fire Island.

In 2023 opened the space under the renamed title "The Barnyard" This is not affiliated with the official Boardy Barn. In 2024 the official Boardy Barn ran pop-up events West Village in New York City at Houston Hall, 222 West Houston.
