= Shinnecock Hills station =

Former train station in New York, US

Shinnecock Hills

General information
- Location: McGregor Drive, off of Hills Station Road; Shinnecock Hills, New York
- Coordinates: 40°53′27″N 72°27′48.6″W
- Owner: Long Island Rail Road
- Platforms: 1 side platform
- Tracks: 1

History
- Opened: 1887
- Closed: 1938

Former services
Preceding station	Long Island Rail Road	Following station
Suffolk Downs toward Long Island City	Montauk Division	Southampton Campus toward Montauk
Hampton Bays toward Manorville	Sag Harbor Branch	Southampton toward Sag Harbor
Location

Shinnecock Hills was a rail station, located along the Montauk Branch of the Long Island Rail Road, in Shinnecock Hills, New York, United States, in service from 1887 to 1938.

The name Shinnecock Hills has been used for the former Southampton College station that was temporarily reactivated during the 2004, 2018, and 2026 U.S. Opens, which took place at the nearby Shinnecock Hills Golf Club.

== History ==
The station first opened around 1887 on the south side of the tracks, and closed in 1938.

The building was used as a U.S. Post Office and as of 2013 was in use as a private residence. In October 2013, the structure was dedicated as a Southampton Town Historic Landmark by the Town of Southampton.
