= Shinnecock Canal Railroad Bridge =

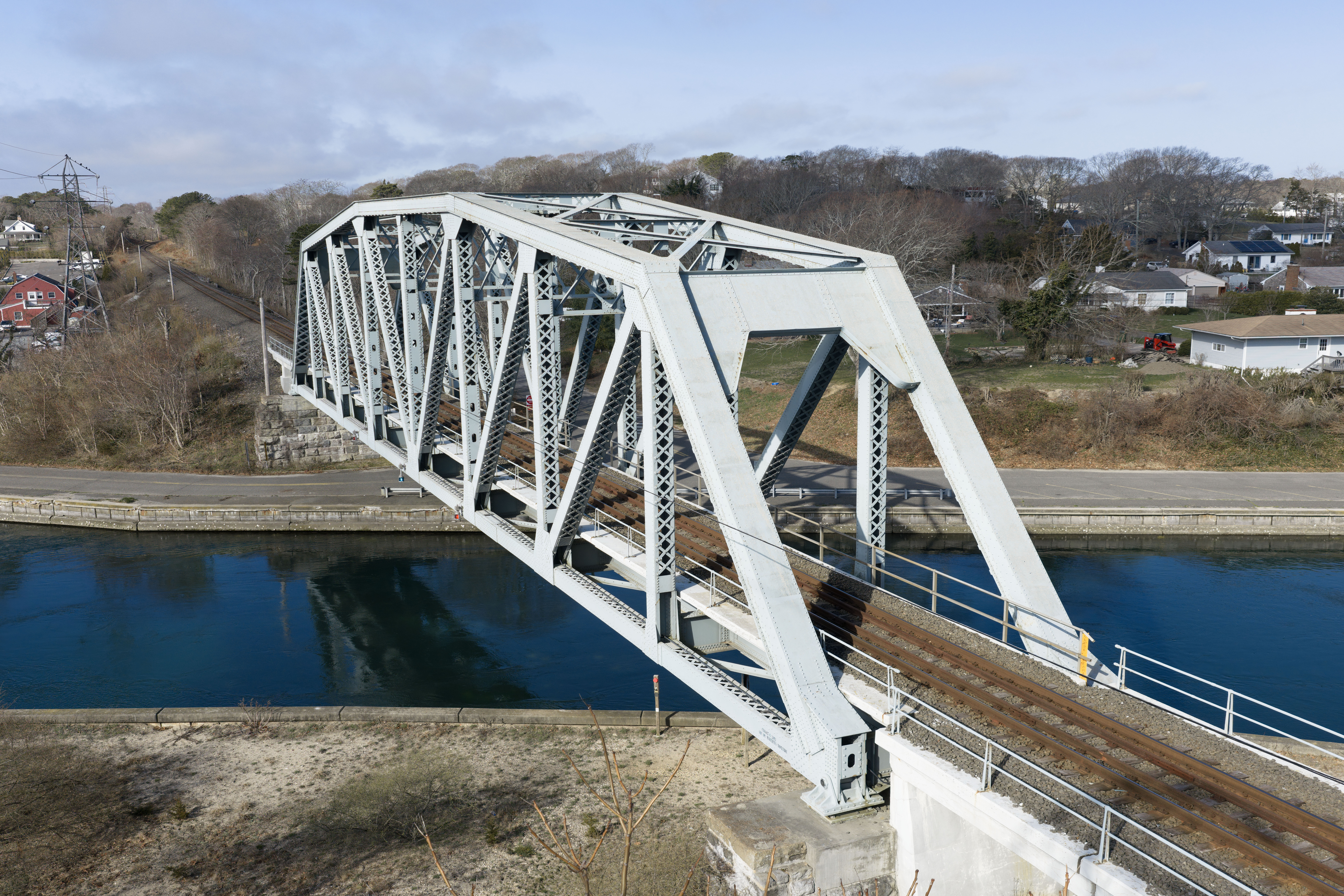
- The bridge in 2026
- Coordinates: 40.887436°N 72.501302°W
- Carries: LIRR Montauk Branch
- Crosses: Shinnecock Canal
- Locale: Smithtown, Suffolk County, New York
- Other name: K4 Bridge
- Owner: Metropolitan Transportation Authority
- Maintained by: Long Island Rail Road

Characteristics
- Design: Truss bridge
- Material: Steel
- Total length: 316 feet (96 meters)
- Height: 22 feet (6.7 meters)

Rail characteristics
- No. of tracks: 1
- Track gauge: 4 feet, 8 1/2 inches (220 millimeters) (Standard gauge)

History
- Opened: 1931 (current bridge); 1870 (original bridge); 1891 (second bridge)
- Rebuilt: 1891, 1931

Location
- Interactive map of Shinnecock Canal Railroad Bridge

The Shinnecock Canal Railroad Bridge (also known as the K4 Bridge) is a railroad bridge carrying the Montauk Branch of the Long Island Rail Road over the Shinnecock Canal in Hampton Bays and Shinnecock Hills, Suffolk County, New York, United States.

== Overview ==
The Shinnecock Canal Railroad Bridge stands at a height of approximately 22 feet (6.7 meters) above the water and measures 316 feet (96 meters) in length. The bridge is constructed of steel and uses a truss design.

As Pennsylvania Railroad K4 class steam locomotives regularly crossed the bridge following the replacement of the second span, the bridge became commonly known as "K4 Bridge." Prior to the current span's construction, these locomotives were unable to cross the bridge due to their weight.

The bridge's NYSDOT bridge identification number is 7710170.

== History ==
The original bridge was constructed in 1870. This girder bridge was replaced by the second bridge – an iron truss bridge – in 1892, as part of the widening of the Shinnecock Canal. Its construction would enable trains using the Montauk Branch – which predates the canal – to travel over the new waterway. It was replaced by a new, near-identical span adjacent to it in 1931; this third bridge, which remains in use today, was placed into service on June 21 of that year.

== See also ==
- Manhasset Viaduct
- Smithtown Trestle
- History of the Long Island Rail Road
- Wreck Lead Bridge
