= Noyack Road station =

Former train station in New York, US

Noyack Road

General information
- Location: Sag Harbor Turnpike and Brick Kiln Road; Sag Harbor, New York
- Coordinates: 40.9901°N 72.3014°W
- Line: Sag Harbor Branch

History
- Opened: 1906
- Closed: May 3, 1939 (Branch closed)
- Former names: Lamb's Corner

Former services
Preceding station	Long Island Rail Road	Following station
Bridgehampton toward Manorville	Sag Harbor Branch	Sag Harbor Terminus
Location

Noyack Road was a railroad station on the Sag Harbor Branch of the Long Island Rail Road in Sag Harbor, New York. While the branch opened in 1869, this station was not added until 37 years later in 1906 as "Lamb's Corner". By 1915, it had been renamed as "Noyack Road".

It was demolished with the rest of the branch shortly after service was withdrawn from the line in 1939.
