= Suffolk Downs station (LIRR) =

Former train station in New York, US

Suffolk Downs

General information
- Location: Hampton Bays, New York
- Coordinates: 40°53′26″N 72°29′2″W
- Owner: LIRR
- Platforms: 1 island platform
- Tracks: 2

History
- Opened: 1907
- Closed: 1927

Former services
Preceding station	Long Island Rail Road	Following station
Canoe Place toward Long Island City	Montauk Division	Shinnecock Hills toward Montauk
Location

Suffolk Downs was a seasonal flag stop along the Montauk Branch of the Long Island Rail Road and was first built in 1907. The depot was purchased by an LIRR employee and was moved to Peconic Bay at an undisclosed location on February 6, 1923 and the station stop itself closed around 1927. The station stop was located between Canoe Place and Shinnecock Hills Stations, near the grade crossing at Peconic Road.
