= Hampton Bays High School =

High school in Hampton Bays, New York, United States

Location
- 88 Argonne Rd; Hampton Bays, (Suffolk County), New York 11946; United States
- Coordinates: 40.8747°N 72.5088°W

Information
- School type: Public school (government funded), high school
- School district: Hampton Bays Public Schools
- NCES District ID: 3613530
- Superintendent: Lars Clemensen
- CEEB code: 332255
- NCES School ID: 361353001108
- Principal: Christopher Richardt
- Teaching staff: 66.43 (on an FTE basis)
- Grades: 9–12
- Gender: Coeducational
- Enrollment: 755 (2023-2024)
- Student to teacher ratio: 11.37
- Language: English
- Campus: Large suburb
- Colors: Purple and white
- Mascot: Baymen
- Newspaper: The Tide

Hampton Bays High School is a public high school located in Hampton Bays, a hamlet in the Town of Southampton in Suffolk County, New York, United States. It is the only high school operated by Hampton Bays Public Schools.

The school was originally known as Hampton Bays Junior-Senior School when it opened in 1971, serving grades seven to twelve. In 1993, the school was renamed Hampton Bays Secondary School until 2008, when it reverted to a high school with the opening of a middle school in the district, with grades seven and eight moving to the new campus.
