= Smithtown Trestle =

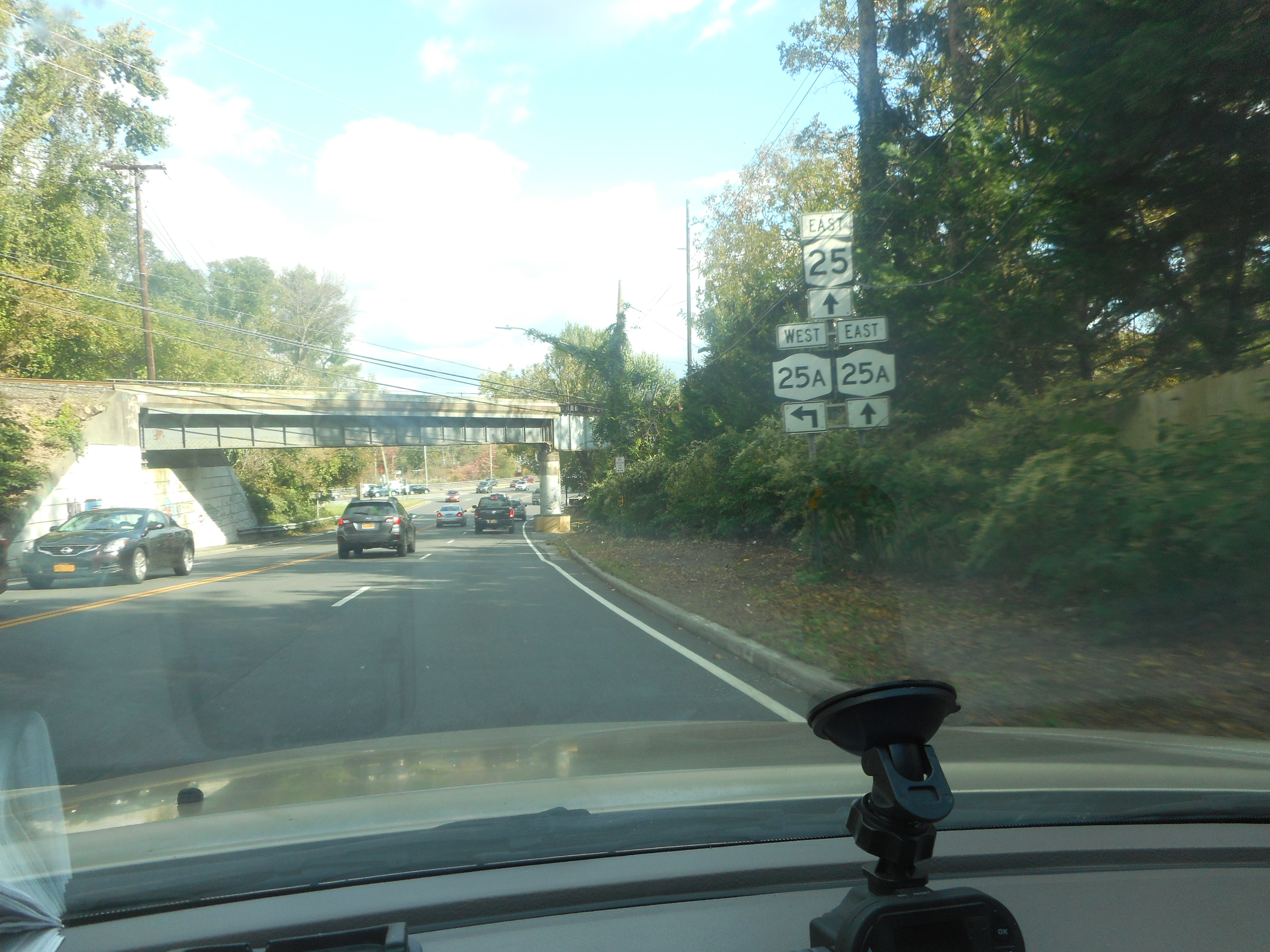
- The west end of the Smithtown Trestle, as seen from Jericho Turnpike (NY 25)
- Coordinates: 40.860224°N 73.212255°W
- Carries: LIRR Port Jefferson Branch
- Crosses: Nissequogue River
- Locale: Smithtown, Suffolk County, New York
- Other name: Nissequogue River Trestle
- Owner: Metropolitan Transportation Authority
- Maintained by: Long Island Rail Road

Characteristics
- Design: Steel stringer bridge
- Material: Steel
- Total length: 484 feet (148 meters)
- Height: 50 feet (15 meters)

Rail characteristics
- No. of tracks: 1
- Track gauge: 4 feet, 8 1/2 inches (220 millimeters) (Standard gauge)

History
- Opened: 1902 (current bridge); 1873 (original bridge)

Location
- Interactive map of Smithtown Trestle

The Smithtown Trestle (also known as the Smithtown Viaduct and the Nissequogue River Trestle) is a railroad trestle carrying the Port Jefferson Branch of the Long Island Rail Road over the Nissequogue River in Smithtown, Suffolk County, New York.

== Overview ==
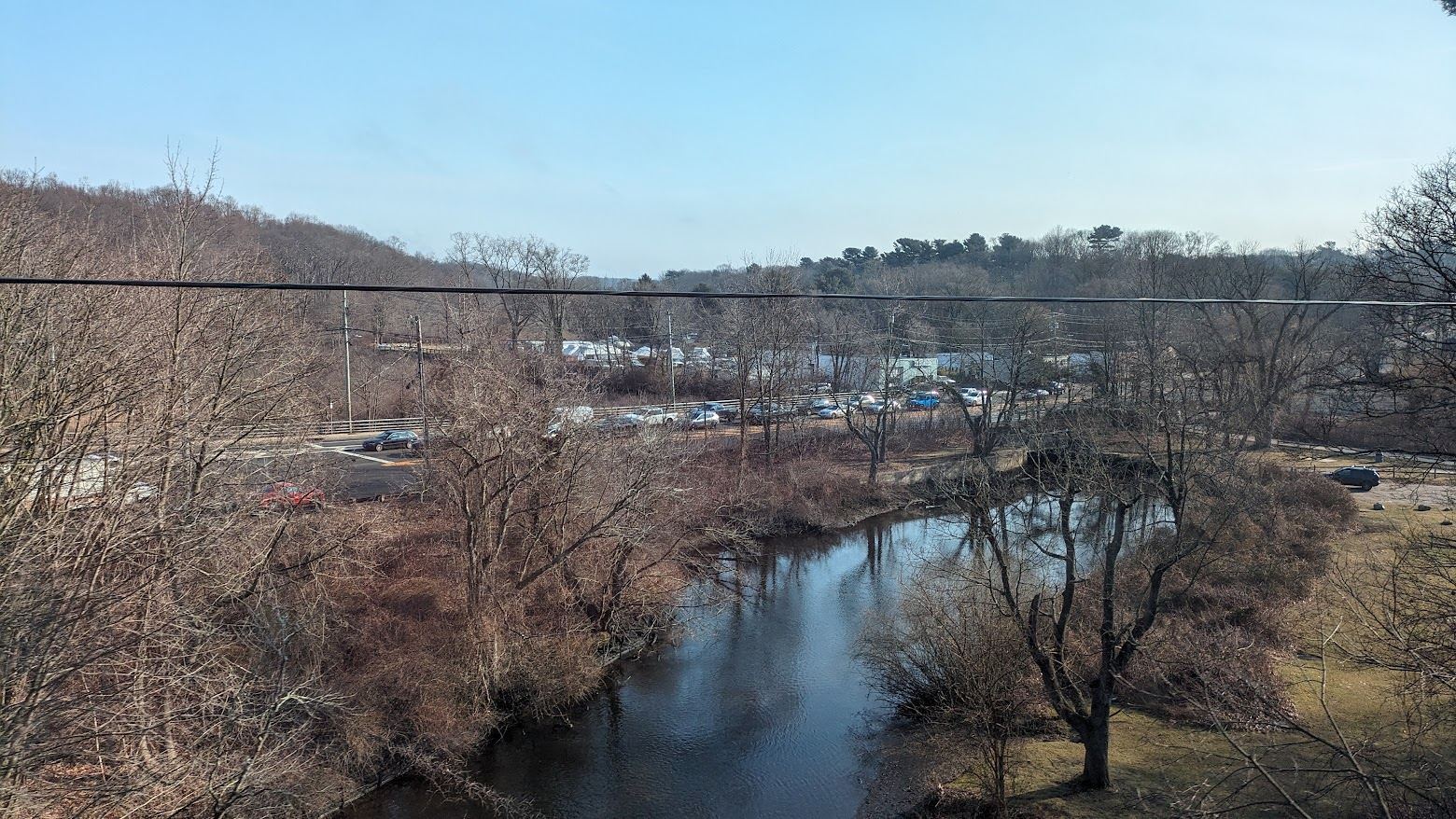
View of the Nissequogue River from a train crossing the trestle in 2024

Standing at a height of approximately 50 feet (15 meters) and measuring 484 feet (148 meters) in length, the Smithtown Trestle carries the LIRR's Port Jefferson Branch over the valley below, Jericho Turnpike (NY 25), and the Nissequogue River. The viaduct is constructed of steel and consists of 12 spans.

The bridge's NYSDOT bridge identification number is 7060810.

== History ==
The original Smithtown Trestle opened in 1873, as part of the Smithtown and Port Jefferson Railroad – an LIRR subsidiary chartered in 1870 to construct an extension of today's Port Jefferson Branch from Northport east to Port Jefferson. This wooden bridge – one of the largest bridges on Long Island at the time of its erection – was replaced by the current steel trestle in 1902. The steel trestle was subsequently rebuilt in 1937.

The trestle's construction was critical in extending the LIRR east to Port Jefferson, as the Nissequogue River and the valley prevented the tracks from running at-grade. With the opening of the bridge, LIRR extension, and the community's nearby train station, Smithtown – at the time largely consisting of farms – experienced growth and gained a rail connection to New York City to the west and Port Jefferson to the east.

== See also ==
- Manhasset Viaduct
- Smithtown station
- History of the Long Island Rail Road
- Shinnecock Canal Railroad Bridge
- Wreck Lead Bridge
