= Southampton Animal Shelter =

US pet rescue and adoption center

The Southampton Animal Shelter is operated by the Southampton Animal Shelter Foundation (SASF), a 501(c)(3) non-profit organization no-kill pet rescue and adoption center, that cares for homeless animals in the Southampton, New York, community of 22 towns, and places them in permanent homes. It is located at 102 Old Riverhead Road West, Hampton Bays, New York. The facility is also home to a low-cost veterinary wellness center that offers affordable spay and neuter surgeries, vaccinations, pet dental, microchipping and more.

== Overview ==
As the community shelter for the Town of Southampton, Southampton Animal Shelter Foundation (SASF) offers a variety of services to the public for companion animals and those who love them. Programs include Advo-Cats, a pet food pantry, a mobile veterinary clinic, and more. The Advo-Cats program was organized to help Trap, Neuter, and Release feral cats to help prevent an overpopulation of community cats. The cats are vaccinated and given diagnostic tests to ensure the population is under control and healthy. Since its inception, SASF’s Advo-Cats TNR Program has spayed and neutered thousands of feral cats.

The Southampton Animal Shelter Foundation was created in January 2010 to take over operation of the shelter from the town of Southampton, New York, which had to stop funding it for budgetary reasons. Susan Allen, daughter of Herbert Allen, co-founder of investment bank Allen & Co., was chairwoman.

== Lawsuit ==
Patricia Lynch, a former NBC Nightly News producer, sued the shelter in 2004 for banning her for writing critical letters to the local press about the shelter's euthanasia policy at the time, and won $50,000 in damages and $71,000 in legal fees. Her win was upheld on appeal in 2008. She later again sued the shelter, claiming she was barred out of spite from volunteering to walk its dogs.
