= Hampton Bays Public Schools =

School district in the U.S. state of New York

Location
- Town of Southampton, NY United States

District information
- Type: Public School District
- Superintendent: Lars Clemensen

Other information
- Website: www.hbschools.us

Hampton Bays Public Schools is a public school district in Hampton Bays, a hamlet in the Town of Southampton in Suffolk County, New York, United States.

The total enrollment for the 2007–2008 school year was 1783 students.

The superintendent is Lars Clemensen.

== Schools ==
- Hampton Bays Elementary School
- Hampton Bays Middle School
  - The middle school opened in February 2008, serving only fifth and sixth graders initially. In September 2008 the district's seventh and eighth graders were also moved to the school, bringing enrollment up to about 600. The school was built at a reported total cost to the district of US$42 million and can accommodate 800 students. The building encompasses 149,515 square feet (13,890.4 m^{2}) and was designed by BBS Architects & Engineers of Patchogue, New York. The actual construction cost was $26.6 million.
- Hampton Bays High School
