= Southampton College station =

Former train station in New York, US

Southampton College

General information
- Location: Tuckahoe Road; Shinnecock Hills, New York
- Coordinates: 40.891134°N 72.438964°W
- Owner: Long Island Rail Road
- Platforms: 1 side platform
- Tracks: 1

Other information
- Station code: SHC
- Fare zone: 14

History
- Opened: 1907, 1976, 2004, 2018
- Closed: 1938, 1998, 2004, 2018
- Rebuilt: 1976, 2004, 2018
- Former names: Golf Grounds (1907–1939); Southampton College (1976–1998); Shinnecock Hills (2004; 2018; 2026)

Former services
Preceding station	Long Island Rail Road	Following station
Shinnecock Hills toward Long Island City	Montauk Branch	Southampton toward Montauk
Hampton Bays toward Long Island City	Montauk Branch	Southampton toward Montauk
Location

Southampton College was a Long Island Rail Road station along the Montauk Branch, located in Shinnecock Hills, New York, United States, that has been temporarily reactivated as Shinnecock Hills for U.S. Open golf tournaments held at nearby Shinnecock Hills Golf Club in the 21st century.

== History ==
Originally a seasonal flag stop called Golf Grounds, the station opened April 1907 to serve sites such as the Shinnecock Hills Golf Club and National Golf Links of America and was closed in 1938.

In order to serve the Long Island University's Southampton College (now owned by Stony Brook University) it reopened as Southampton College on May 24, 1976.

In 1986, the Long Island Rail Road also provided service at this station for spectators traveling to the 1986 U.S. Open.

On March 16, 1998, the station was once again discontinued as a station stop and was subsequently demolished – along with a handful of other Long Island Rail Road stations – due to low ridership. At the time, the station had an average daily ridership of 16 passengers, and the low ridership did not make it cost effective for high level platforms to be installed to accommodate the LIRR's new C3 bilevel rail cars, which require such platforms.

=== Temporary re-openings ===
A temporary station named Shinnecock Hills with a high level platform was opened at this location for the 2004, 2018, and 2026 U.S. Opens.

== Station layout ==
The station had 1 low level side platform. As the newer C3 railcars required high level platforms at stations, the trains would not be able to serve the station without building a new, high level platform to replace the existing low level one.

The temporary station in June 2018 had a 10-car high-level platform.

For the 2026 U.S. Open, the LIRR doubled the number of trains to the station since the 2018 Open and increased the number of cars able to platform from 10 to 12.

Track 1
← Montauk Branch toward Long Island City or Penn Station (Hampton Bays)

Montauk Branch toward Montauk (Southampton) →

Side platform, doors will open on the left or right
