= Manhasset Viaduct =

Viaduct in Nassau County, New York

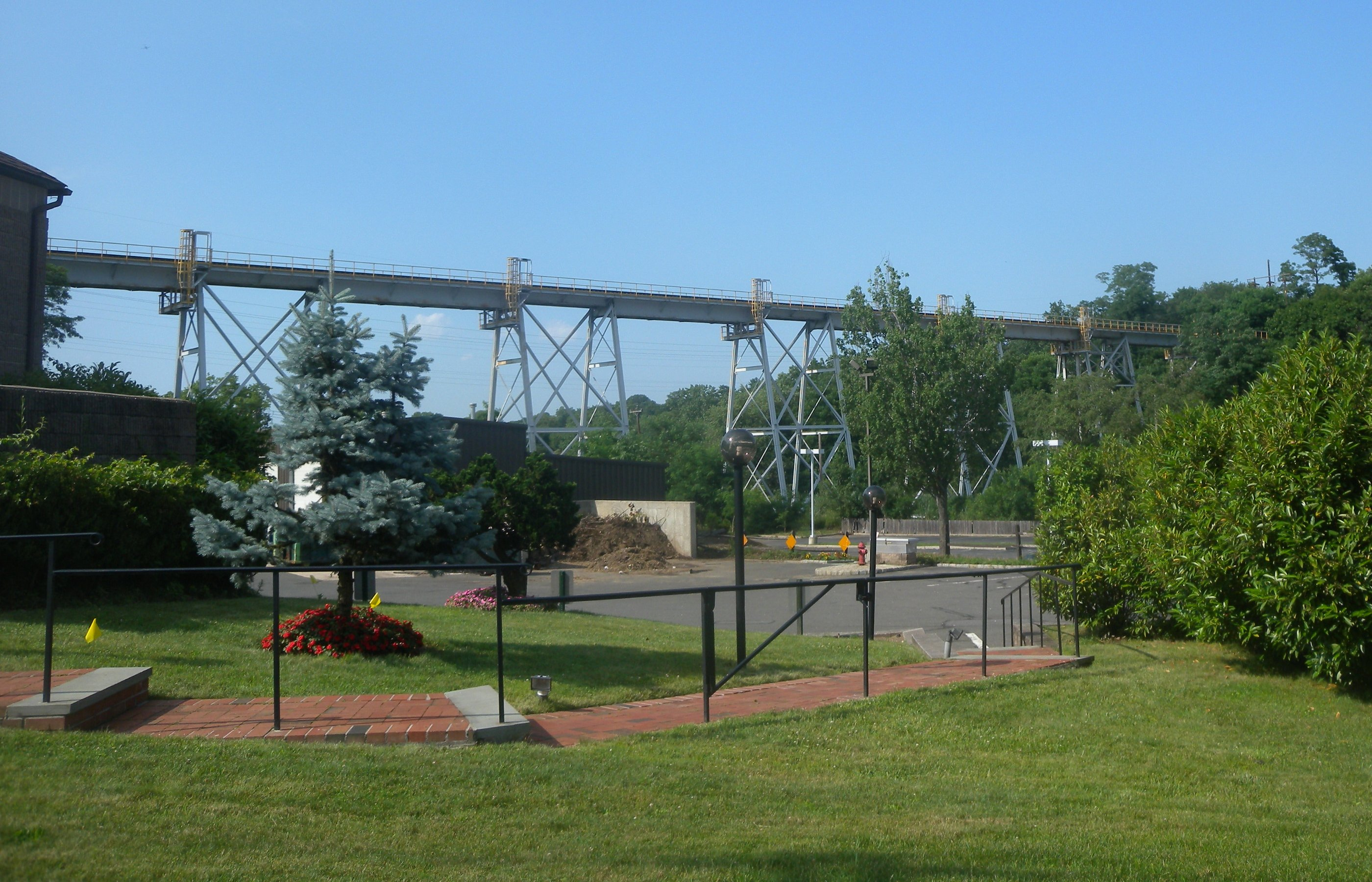
- The Manhasset Viaduct, as seen from the Thomaston side, looking northeast.
- Coordinates: 40°47′33″N 73°42′36″W
- Carries: LIRR Port Washington Branch
- Crosses: Manhasset Bay
- Locale: Village of Thomaston and Hamlet of Manhasset, Nassau County, New York
- Owner: Metropolitan Transportation Authority
- Maintained by: Metropolitan Transportation Authority

Characteristics
- Design: Steel stringer bridge
- Material: Steel
- Total length: 679 feet (207 meters)
- Height: 81 feet (25 meters)

Rail characteristics
- No. of tracks: 1
- Track gauge: 4 ft 8 1/2 in (1,435 mm) standard gauge
- Electrified: October 21, 1913

History
- Constructed by: King Bridge Co. Carnegie Steel Company
- Opened: June 23, 1898

Location
- Interactive map of Manhasset Viaduct

The Manhasset Viaduct (also known as the Manhasset Valley Bridge, the Manhasset Valley Viaduct, and the Manhasset Trestle) is a railroad viaduct located between Manhasset and the Village of Thomaston within the Town of North Hempstead, on Long Island, New York. It carries the Port Washington Branch of the Long Island Rail Road over Manhasset Bay, between the Cow Neck and Great Neck Peninsulas.

== Overview ==
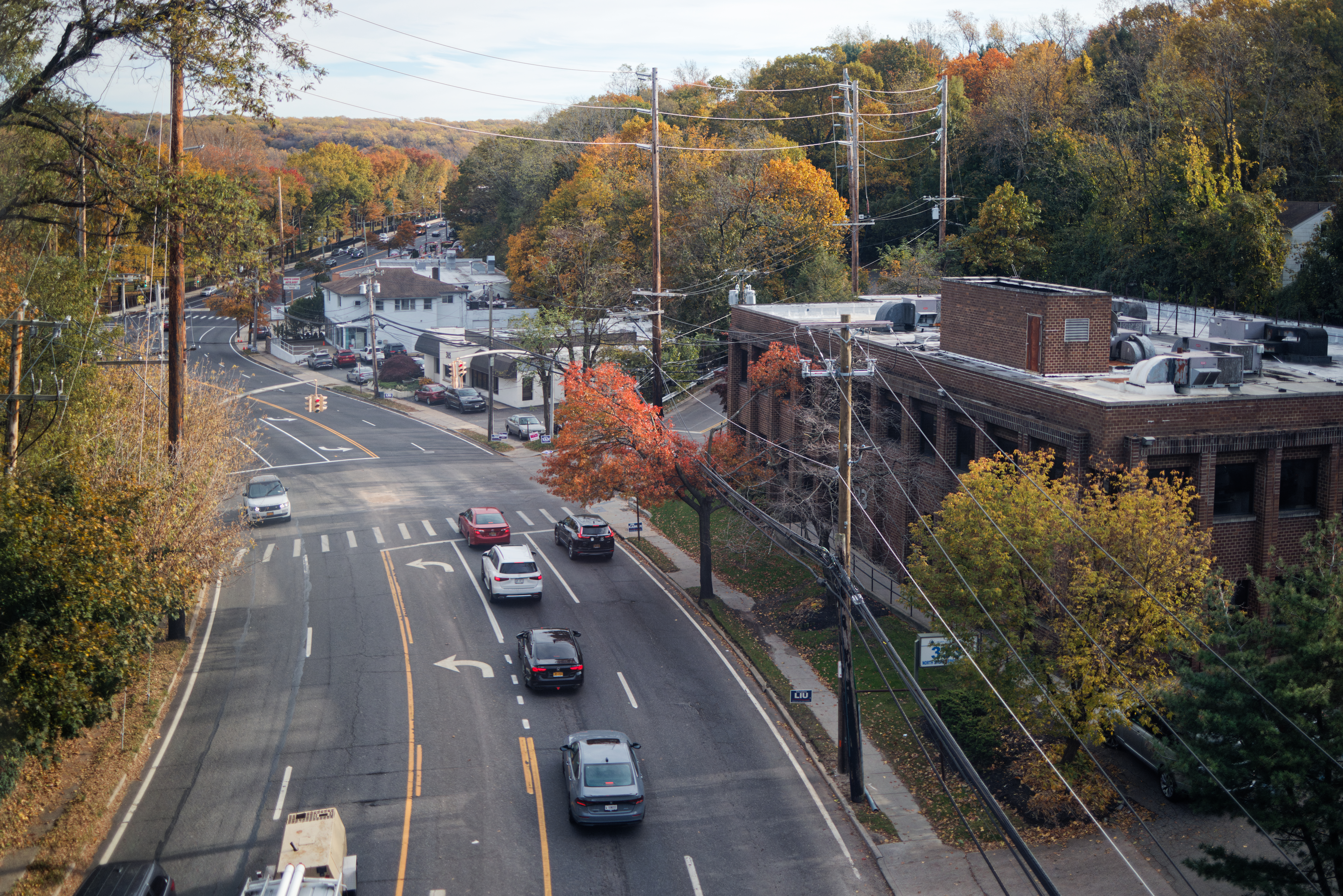
East Shore Road from the viaduct

Standing at a height of 81 feet (25 meters) above Manhasset Bay and measuring 679 feet (207 meters) in length, the Manhasset Viaduct is the highest bridge on the entire LIRR network. The viaduct uses a steel stringer bridge design and is one of two King Bridge Company-built railway viaducts still in operation as of 2025 – the other being the Short Line Viaduct near Cleveland, Ohio.

The Manhasset Viaduct is a critical component of the infrastructure on the LIRR's Port Washington Branch. Its construction enabled the railroad line to traverse the Manhasset Valley and Manhasset Bay: due to the surrounding area's geographical and topographical characteristics, the LIRR could not extend the line into Manhasset and Port Washington – both communities being located across the valley, on the Cow Neck Peninsula – without it building a viaduct over it and the bay.

The viaduct also passes over two major roads – one on each end: East Shore Road (at its west end) and Bayview Avenue (at its east end).

== History ==
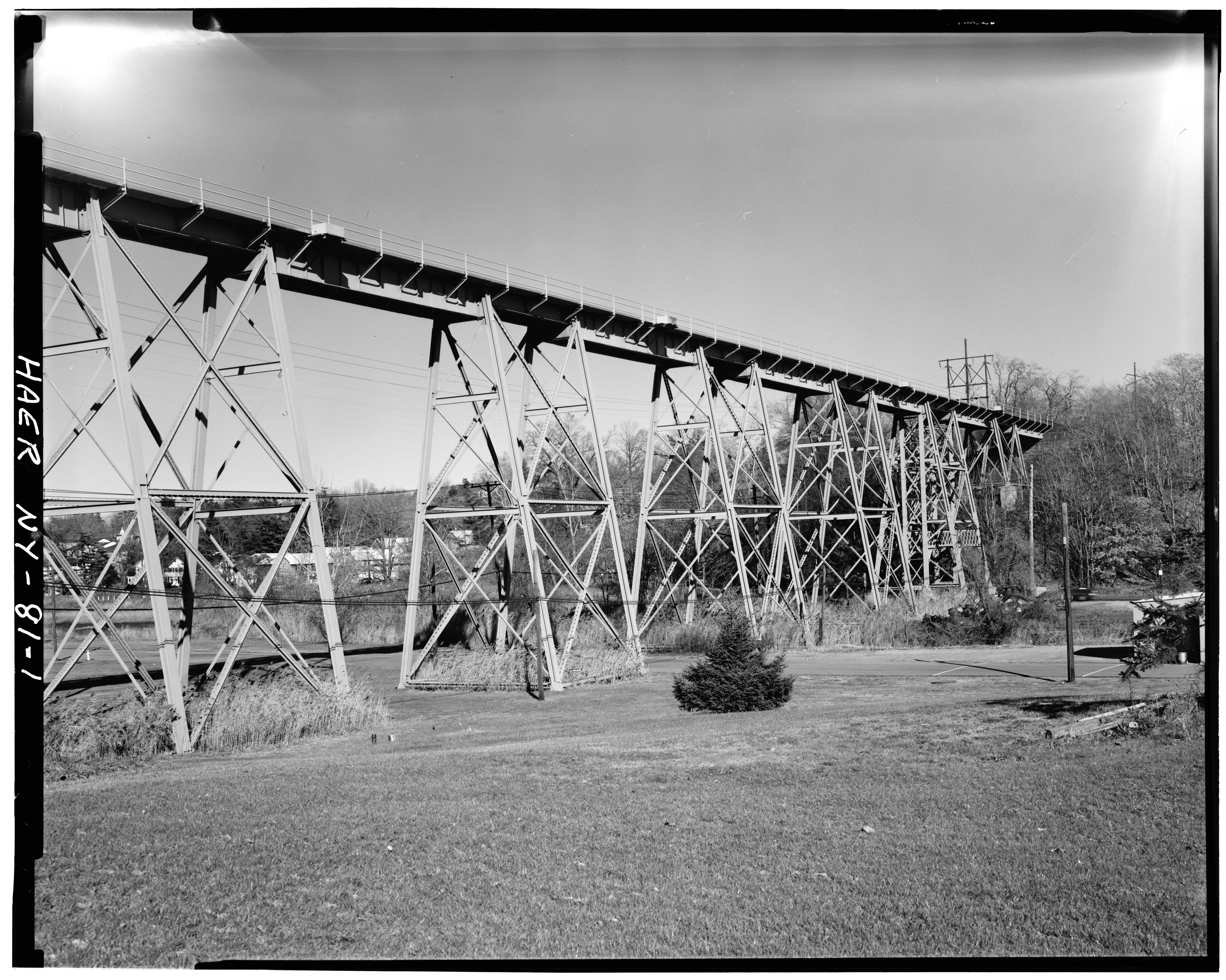
The Manhasset Viaduct shortly after its completion, looking east

The Manhasset Viaduct was completed in 1898, and opened on June 23 of that year, as part of the Port Washington Branch's extension from Great Neck to Port Washington. It was erected by the Cincinnati, Ohio-based King Bridge Company, as well as the Carnegie Steel Company, and was constructed using Carnegie Steel.

In 1913, the remainder of the Port Washington Branch between the line's split with the former Whitestone Branch east to Port Washington – including the portion of the line over this bridge – was electrified with a third rail, thus enabling electric trains to operate along the entire line; the electrification officially took place on October 21 of that year.

=== Historical integrity ===
The Manhasset Viaduct is eligible for listing on the National Register of Historic Places, due to its historical and architectural significance and ties to the Carnegie Steel Company.

== In popular culture ==
The Manhasset Viaduct was featured in the 1914 serial, The Perils of Pauline.

== See also ==
- Manhasset station
- Smithtown Trestle
- Port Washington Branch
- History of the Long Island Rail Road
- Wreck Lead Bridge
