= Shinnecock Canal =

Canal in New York, United States

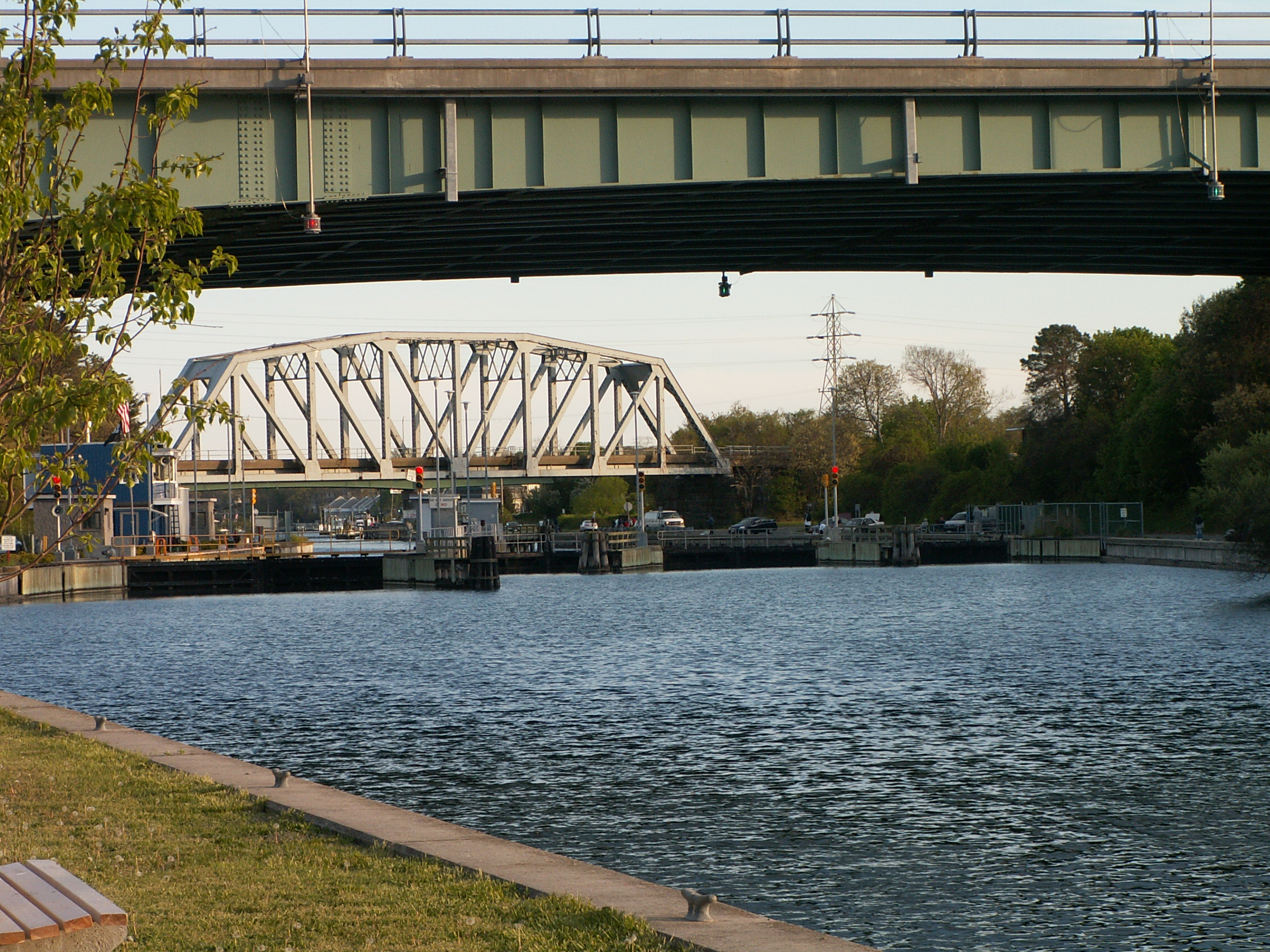
- Looking south toward the locks and Shinnecock Bay
- Location: Hampton Bays, New York, U.S.
- Country: United States
- Coordinates: 40°53′15″N 72°30′5″W

Specifications
- Length: 0.9 miles (1.4 km)
- Lock length: 250 ft (76 m)
- Lock width: 41 ft (12 m)
- Maximum boat air draft: 22 feet (6.7 m)
- Locks: 1
- Total rise: 3 feet (0.91 m)
- Status: Open

History
- Date of first use: 1892

Geography
- Start point: Peconic Bay
- End point: Shinnecock Bay

The Shinnecock Canal (also known as the Shinnecock and Peconic Canal) is a canal that cuts across the South Fork at Hampton Bays, New York. At 4,700 feet (1,400 m) long, it connects Great Peconic Bay and the north fork of Long Island with Shinnecock Bay and the Atlantic Ocean. The canal opened to traffic in 1892.

Although "the Hamptons" officially begins about 10 miles (16 km) west at Westhampton, New York, the Shinnecock Canal, which funnels traffic across bridges for the Sunrise Highway, Montauk Highway, and Long Island Rail Road, marks their beginning in popular imagination.

== History ==
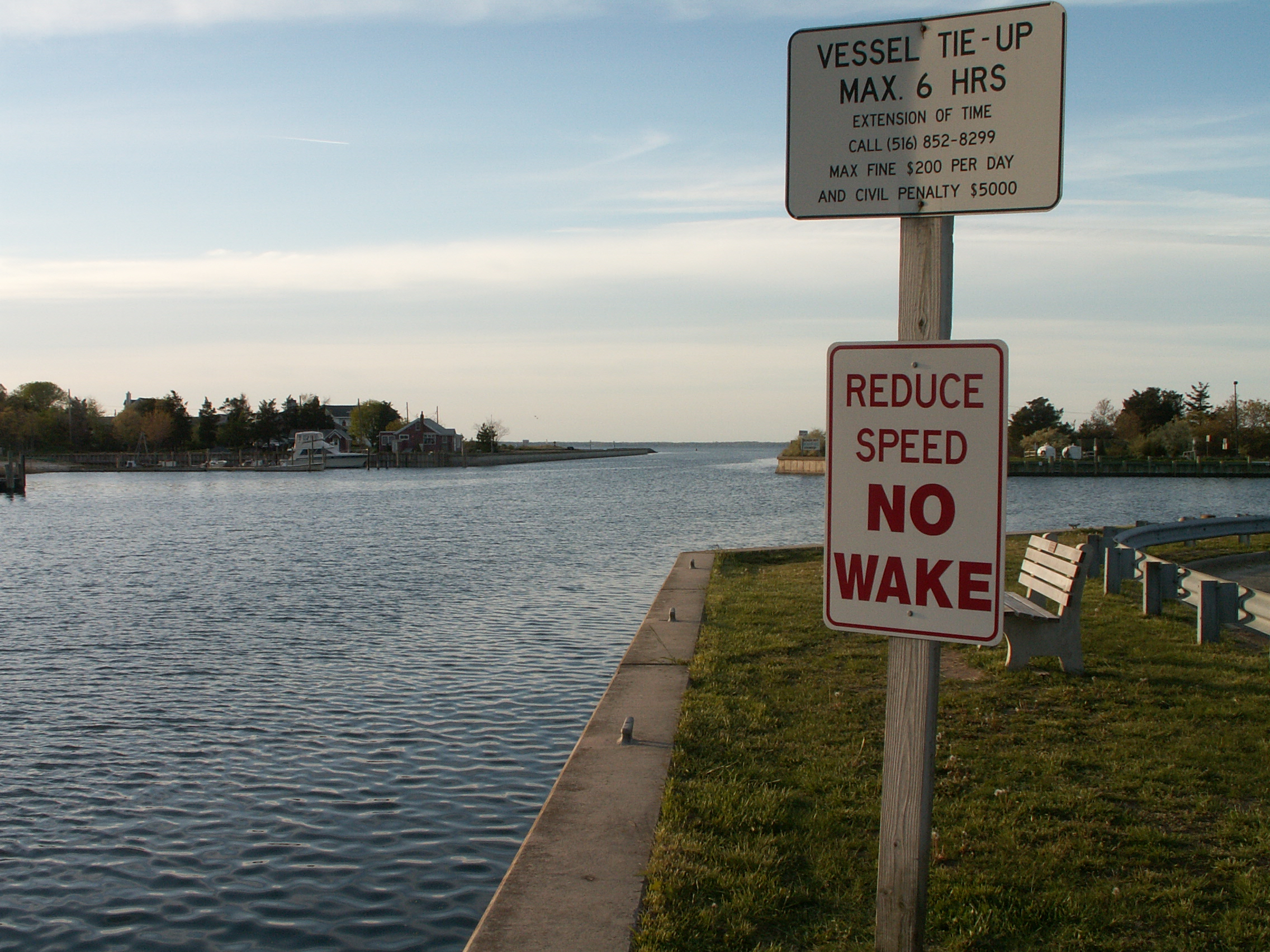
Looking north toward Great Peconic Bay from the Shinnecock Canal

The original Shinnecock Canal was dug in 1892. To alleviate tidal differences of 3 feet (0.91 m) and more between Peconic Bay to the north and Shinnecock Bay, construction of "tide gates" and bulkheading (not a canal lock as exists today) began in 1918. This did not alleviate the difference in elevation between the canal's two ends but sought to mitigate it. Another effect of this – as found in the records of the New York State Salt Water Bays Commission – was the water level of Shinnecock Bay was raised by one foot (0.3 m).

The canal varies in width from 100 to 180 feet (30 to 55 m). The lock is 41 feet (12 m) wide and 250 feet (76 m) long. The lowest bridge is the fixed railroad bridge, with a height of 22 feet (6.7 m) vertical clearance above the water. The highway bridges have 23 feet (7.0 m) and 25 feet (7.6 m), respectively.

The lock system now is the only navigation lock operating on Long Island. The lock increased the salinity levels in Shinnecock Bay which had nearly assumed fresh water proportions and was resulting in a dying off of its shellfish population even though it was separated from the Atlantic by a narrow barrier island. Shinnecock Bay's salinity levels were solidified during Great Hurricane of 1938, which broke through the barrier island to form Shinnecock Inlet almost due south of the canal. The new inlet has created a shortcut to the Atlantic that is now used by 27,000 boats per year.

== See also ==
- Shinnecock Canal Railroad Bridge
- Peconic Bay
- Shinnecock Inlet
