= Hampton Bays, New York =

- Hamlet and census-designated place
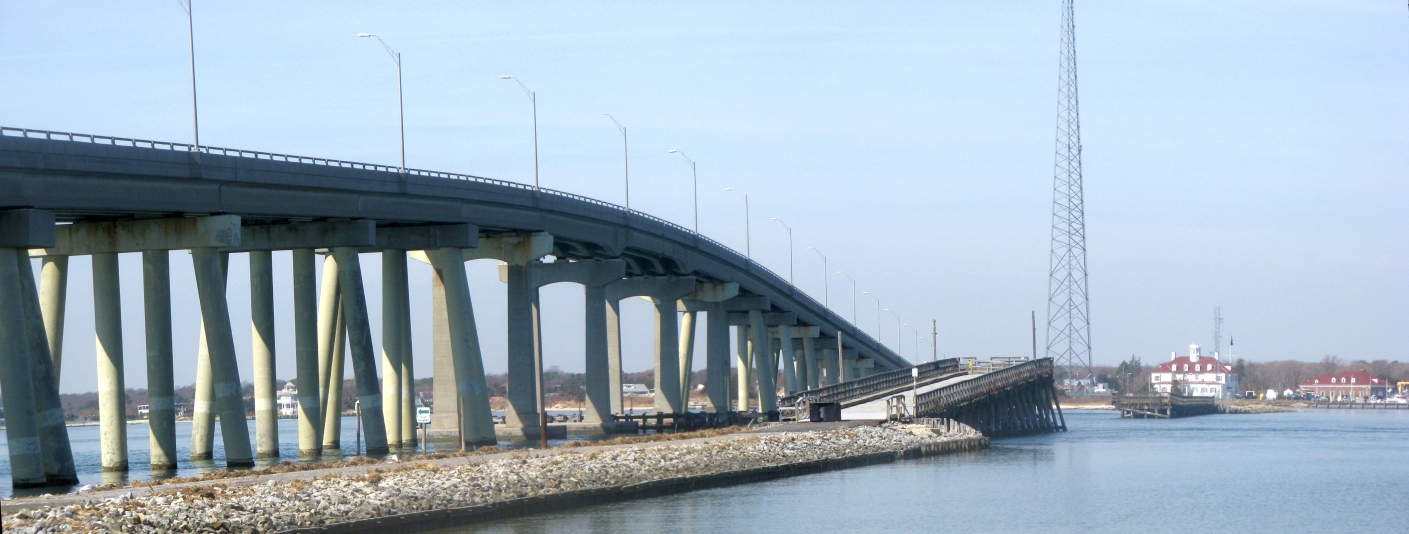
- Ponquogue Bridge over Shinnecock Inlet (new span on left) looking toward the Coast Guard station.

- Flag

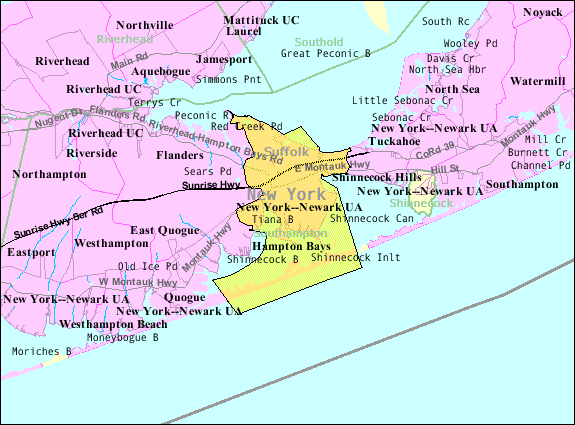

- Location within New York
- Coordinates: 40°52′26″N 72°31′16″W
- Country: United States
- State: New York
- County: Suffolk
- Town: Southampton

Area
  - Total: 20.51 sq mi (53.12 km^{2})
  - Land: 12.93 sq mi (33.50 km^{2})
  - Water: 7.57 sq mi (19.61 km^{2})
- Elevation: 33 ft (10 m)

Population (2020)
  - Total: 15,228
  - Density: 1,177.3/sq mi (454.54/km^{2})
- Time zone: UTC−05:00 (Eastern Time Zone)
  - Summer (DST): UTC−04:00
- ZIP Code: 11946
- Area codes: 631, 934
- FIPS code: 36-31896
- GNIS feature ID: 0952135

Hampton Bays is a hamlet and census-designated place (CDP) in the Town of Southampton in Suffolk County, on Long Island, in New York. It is considered as part of the region of Long Island known as The Hamptons. As of the 2020 census, Hampton Bays had a population of 15,228.

== History ==
The hamlet was settled in 1740 as "Good Ground", which became the main hamlet of eleven in the immediate area.

As a result of the growth of the surrounding hamlets and villages in the Hamptons and increased tourism from New York City, the eleven hamlets, although generally called "Good Ground" collectively by the early part of the 20th century, amalgamated under the name "Hampton Bays" in 1922.

In the early 1970s and the 2010s, portions of Hampton Bays unsuccessfully attempted to incorporate itself as the Incorporated Village of Hampton Bays.

== Geography ==
According to the U.S. Census Bureau, the CDP has a total area of 18.1 square miles (47.0 km^{2}), of which 12.9 square miles (33.5 km^{2}) is land and 5.2 square miles (13.4 km^{2}), or 28.54%, is water. The hamlet is surrounded by three bays, the Peconic Bay to the north, and Shinnecock and Tiana bays to the south. The two southern bays are a part of a greater bay system, called the Great South Bay system, which stretches from approximately Southampton Village to Jamaica Bay in New York City. The Shinnecock Canal, a man-made canal located in the eastern part of the hamlet, connects the Great Peconic Bay with the Shinnecock Bay. Shinnecock Inlet, which leads from the Shinnecock Bay to the Atlantic Ocean, is the easternmost inlet, making it very popular for commercial fishing. The inlet itself, which separates the barrier beaches of Hampton Bays from those of neighboring Southampton, was created in the 1938 New England hurricane when the forces of the hurricane washed over that area of barrier beach, connecting the waters of the Atlantic with the bay.

The Hampton Bays CDP is bounded by the Atlantic Ocean to the south; by the Shinnecock Inlet and the eastern portion of Shinnecock Bay to the east, beyond which lie the village of Southampton and the CDP of Shinnecock Hills; by Peconic Bay to the north, beyond which lie the towns of Southold and Riverhead; and by the CDPs of Flanders and East Quogue (still within the town of Southampton) to the west.

Hampton Bays is located approximately 81 miles (130 km) east of Manhattan.

== Demographics ==
Historical population
Census	Pop.	Note	%±
2000	12,236		—
2010	13,603		11.2%
2020	15,228		11.9%
U.S. Decennial Census

=== Racial and ethnic composition ===
Hampton Bays CDP, New York – Racial and ethnic composition Note: the US Census treats Hispanic/Latino as an ethnic category. This table excludes Latinos from the racial categories and assigns them to a separate category. Hispanics/Latinos may be of any race.
Race / Ethnicity (NH = Non-Hispanic)	Pop 2000	Pop 2010	Pop 2020	% 2000	% 2010	% 2020
White alone (NH)	10,402	9,274	8,759	85.01%	68.18%	57.52%
Black or African American alone (NH)	92	161	167	0.75%	1.18%	1.10%
Native American or Alaska Native alone (NH)	9	24	25	0.07%	0.18%	0.16%
Asian alone (NH)	82	108	177	0.67%	0.79%	1.16%
Native Hawaiian or Pacific Islander alone (NH)	2	5	1	0.02%	0.04%	0.01%
Other race alone (NH)	25	27	110	0.20%	0.20%	0.72%
Mixed race or Multiracial (NH)	95	109	274	0.78%	0.80%	1.80%
Hispanic or Latino (any race)	1,529	3,895	5,715	12.50%	28.63%	37.53%
Total	12,236	13,603	15,228	100.00%	100.00%	100.00%

=== 2020 census ===
As of the 2020 census, Hampton Bays had a population of 15,228. The median age was 42.2 years. 19.5% of residents were under the age of 18 and 18.6% were 65 years of age or older. For every 100 females, there were 100.1 males, and for every 100 females age 18 and over, there were 100.3 males.

95.6% of residents lived in urban areas, while 4.4% lived in rural areas.

There were 5,669 households, of which 29.6% had children under the age of 18 living in them. Of all households, 47.8% were married-couple households, 19.5% were households with a male householder and no spouse or partner present, and 25.7% were households with a female householder and no spouse or partner present. About 27.6% of all households were made up of individuals, and 14.5% had someone living alone who was 65 years of age or older.

There were 7,879 housing units, of which 28.0% were vacant. The homeowner vacancy rate was 2.4% and the rental vacancy rate was 7.8%.

=== 2000 census ===
As of the census of 2000, there were 12,236 people, 4,877 households, and 3,092 families residing in the CDP. The population density was 1,016.1 inhabitants per square mile (392.3/km^{2}). There were 6,875 housing units at an average density of 570.9 per square mile (220.4/km^{2}). The racial makeup of the CDP was 92% White, 0.87% African American, 0.13% Native American, 0.70% Asian, 0.10% Pacific Islander, 3.69% from other races, and 1.55% from two or more races. Hispanic or Latino of any race were 2% of the population.

There were 4,877 households, out of which 26.4% had children under the age of 18 living with them, 50.5% were married couples living together, 8.4% had a female householder with no husband present, and 36.6% were non-families. 28.5% of all households were made up of individuals, and 13.2% had someone living alone who was 65 years of age or older. The average household size was 2.48 and the average family size was 3.00.

In the CDP, the population was spread out, with 20.8% under the age of 18, 7.8% from 18 to 24, 31.1% from 25 to 44, 23.9% from 45 to 64, and 16.5% who were 65 years of age or older. The median age was 39 years. For every 100 females, there were 98.6 males. For every 100 females age 18 and over, there were 96.3 males.

The median income for a household in the CDP was $50,161, and the median income for a family was $58,773. Males had a median income of $47,633 versus $30,426 for females. The per capita income for the CDP was $27,027. About 6.7% of families and 10.7% of the population were below the poverty threshold, including 12.9% of those under age 18 and 10.7% of those age 65 or over.

== Economy ==
Like most of the other communities in The Hamptons, tourism is a critical component of the local economy.

Commercial fishing remains a vital part of the Hampton Bays economy, centered on the fishing station at Shinnecock Inlet. After Montauk, Hampton Bays is the second-busiest commercial fishing port in the state of New York. According to 2014 statistics by the National Marine Fisheries Service, 4.7 million pounds of finfish and shellfish, worth $5.5 million, were landed in the Hampton Bays/Shinnecock port.

Hampton Bays was used as the set of the 2007 movie Margot at the Wedding starring Nicole Kidman and Jack Black.

== Education ==
Hampton Bays is served by Hampton Bays Public Schools. The district operates three schools. Hampton Bays Elementary School serves grades Pre-K-4, and Hampton Bays Middle School, which fully opened in Fall 2008, serves grades 5-8. It is the first "green" school in New York state. Hampton Bays High School serves grades 9-12.

HB Schools' athletic teams are called the "Baymen", in honor of local commercial fishermen who work the hamlet's inland waters. Team colors are purple, black and white.

== Media ==
WLIR-FM is a radio station licensed to serve Hampton Bays.

== Transportation ==
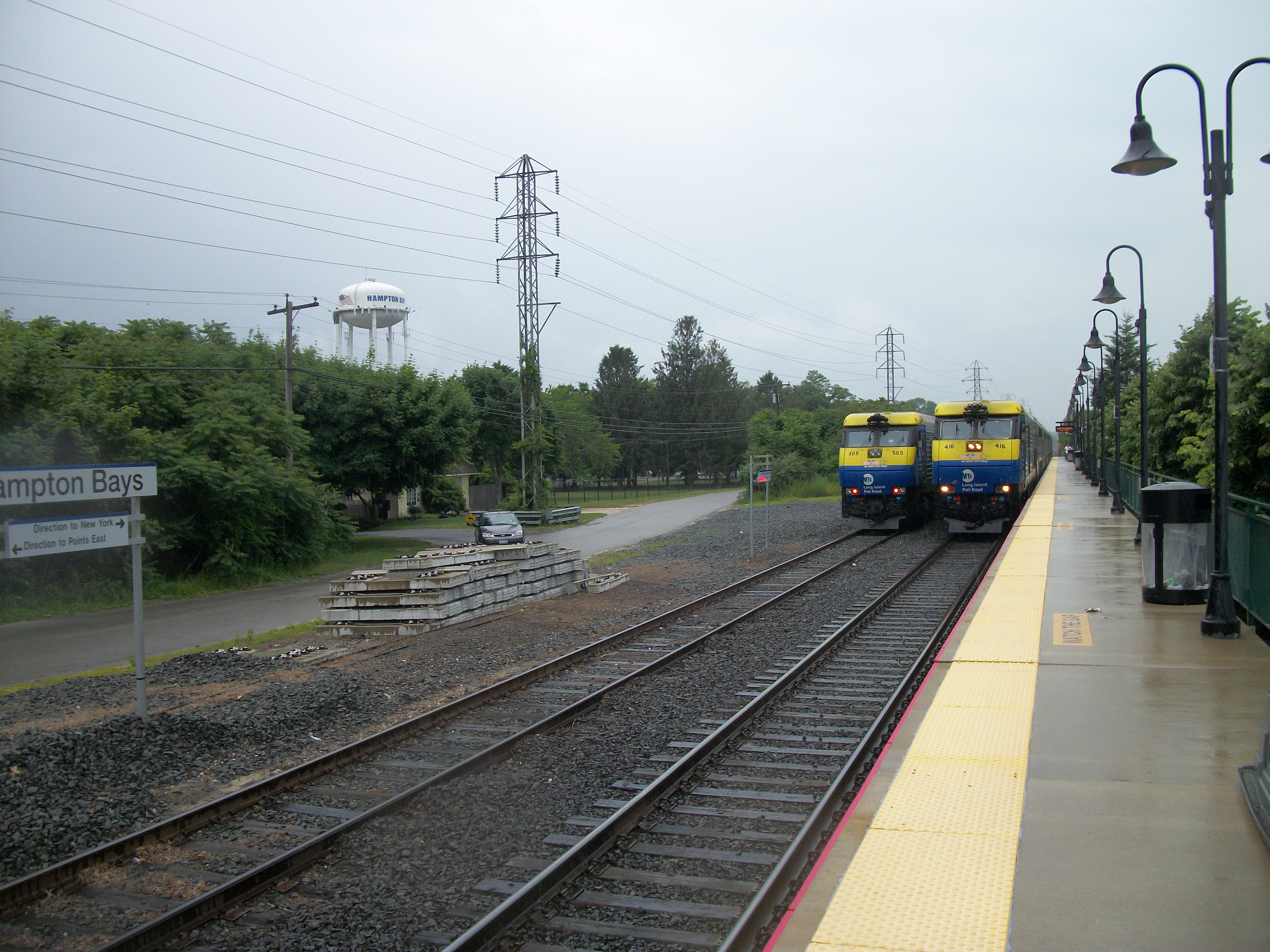
Hampton Bays LIRR Station and two trains

Hampton Bays is served by Sunrise Highway (NY 27), which is a major artery to the western parts of Long Island and New York City. The hamlet is also served by Montauk Highway (NY 27A), which runs from Queens to Montauk. Montauk Highway serves as the "Main Street" of many hamlets and villages along the south shore of Long Island.

The Long Island Rail Road (LIRR) provides limited rail service seven days per week via the Montauk Branch connecting Hampton Bays to Montauk and New York City. Hampton Jitney and Hampton Luxury Liner coach bus services provide slightly more frequent passenger travel between New York City and Hampton Bays, especially during summer months. Local Suffolk County buses also provide service to neighboring areas.

The waterways in the area, including the Shinnecock Canal, provide invaluable routes for boats.

== See also ==
- Good Ground Windmill
- Hampton Bays Public Schools
- Hampton Bays station
- Southampton, New York
- The Southampton Animal Shelter, located at 102 Old Riverhead Road West, Hampton Bays

Preceded by Southampton	The Hamptons	Succeeded by Quogue
