= Sag Harbor Branch =

Former Long Island Rail Road branch

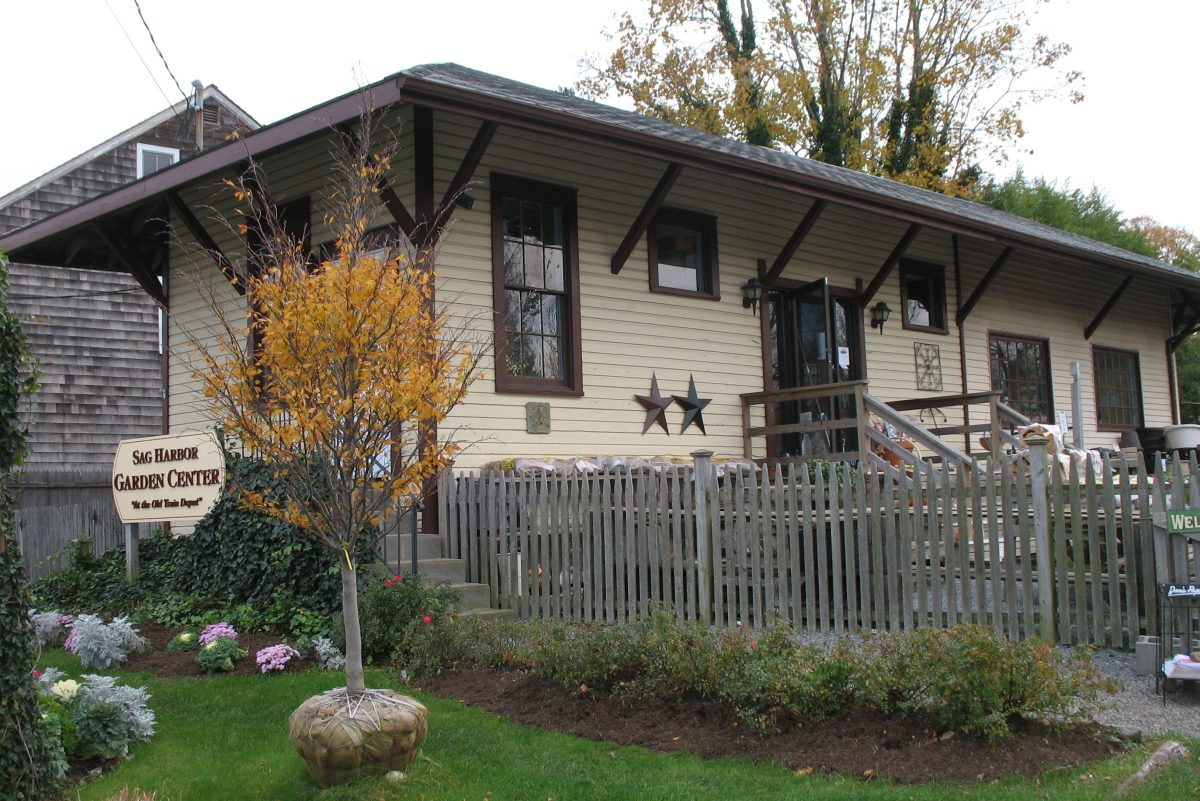
- Sag Harbor train station

Overview
- Status: Abandoned
- Locale: Southampton (town), New York
- Termini: Bridgehampton (south); Sag Harbor (north)
- Stations: 3

Service
- Type: Passenger and Freight
- Operator(s): Long Island Rail Road

History
- Opened: 1869
- Closed: May 3, 1939 (Bridgehampton-Sag Harbor); December 27, 1949 (Manorville-Eastport)

Technical
- Line length: 4.8 miles (7.7 km)
- Track gauge: 4 ft 8 1/2 in (1,435 mm)

The Sag Harbor Branch was a branch of the Long Island Rail Road that was the eastern terminal on the south shore line of Long Island from 1869 to 1895 and then was a spur from Bridgehampton to Sag Harbor, New York from 1895 to 1939.

It originally continued west from Bridgehampton along the current Montauk Branch to Eastport and used what later became the Manorville Branch to the Main Line at Manorville.

== History ==
The line was conceived and surveyed in 1854. In 1869 LIRR president Oliver Charlick wanted the branch to head off plans by the South Side Railroad to extend their line beyond Patchogue. A map of the branch can be seen along with the proposed SSRRLI extension from Patchogue. The original plans called for the branch to leave the Main Line at Riverhead. But Riverhead refused to pay the LIRR for the benefits of being at a junction, so the west end was moved to Manorville in the pine barrens in 1869. During construction the Quogue station "on a Sunday morning" was moved by the village from its original and current location to a location on Old Depot Road.

The Sag Harbor Line remained the farthest point on the LIRR's south shore line until 1895 when the LIRR extended the road at Bridgehampton to Montauk leaving the Sag Harbor section a spur of the Montauk Line. In 1906, a new station was opened in Sag Harbor named "Lamb's Corner". Sometime later, this station was renamed to "Noyack Road". During World War I, a freight spur was built onto the newly reinforced Long Wharf in Sag Harbor to deliver torpedoes for the E.W. Bliss Company for testing in the harbor.

The Sag Harbor branch was abandoned on May 3, 1939. A former section of the line in Sag Harbor known as Wharf Street has been designated Suffolk County Road 81 and runs from NY 114 to the Sag Harbor Pier. The rest of the road bed was transformed into the Long Pond Greenbelt. The road bed is now a hiking trail. The freight house at the Sag Harbor train station housed the Sag Harbor Garden Center's retail store until February 1, 2022, when renovations began to transform to building into Kidd Squid Brewing Company's flagship tasting room, which opened in July 2022 and continues in operation today.

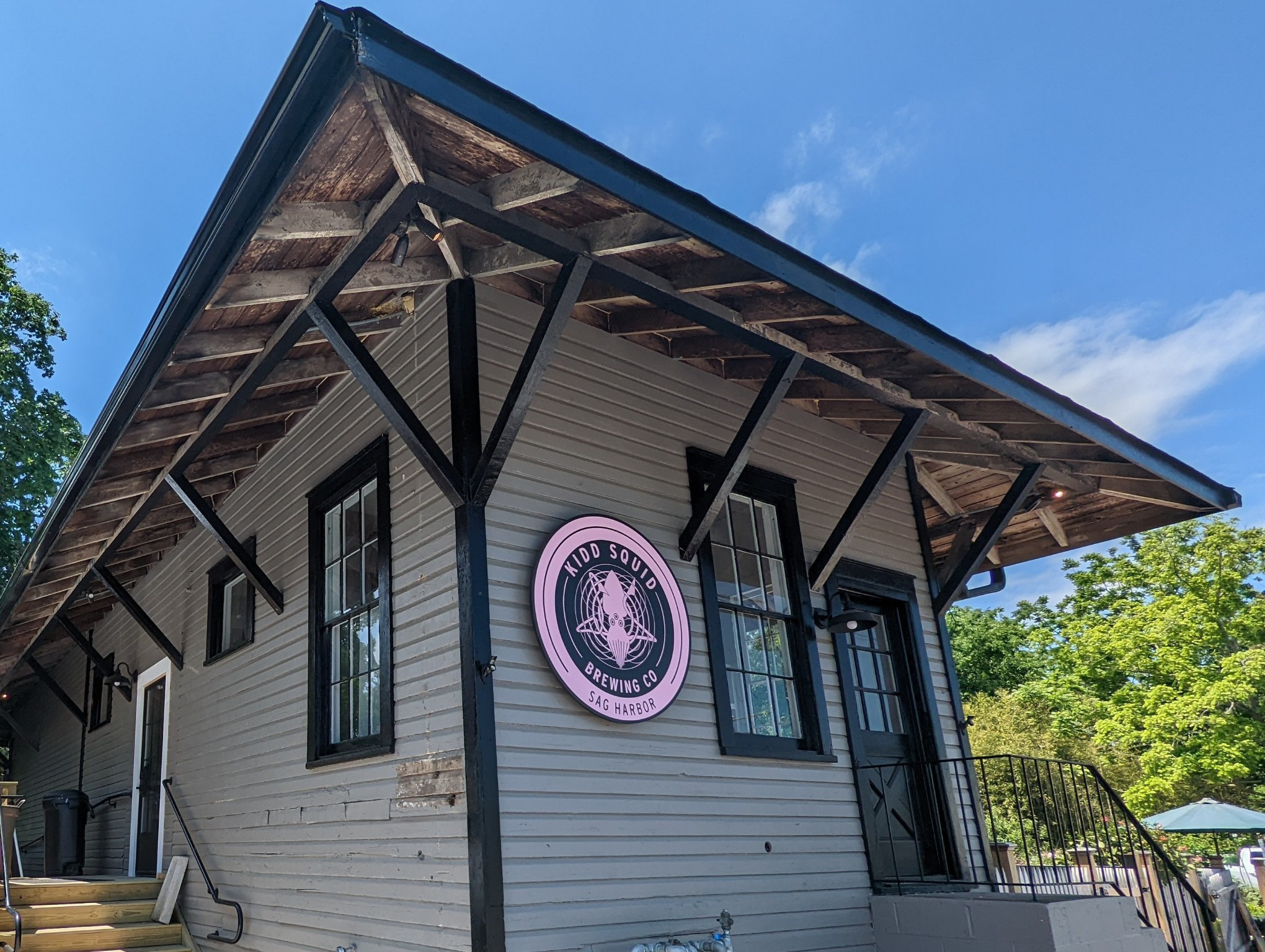
Photograph of the Sag Harbor freight station in its current use as the flagship tasting room for the Kidd Squid Brewing Company

== Manorville Branch ==
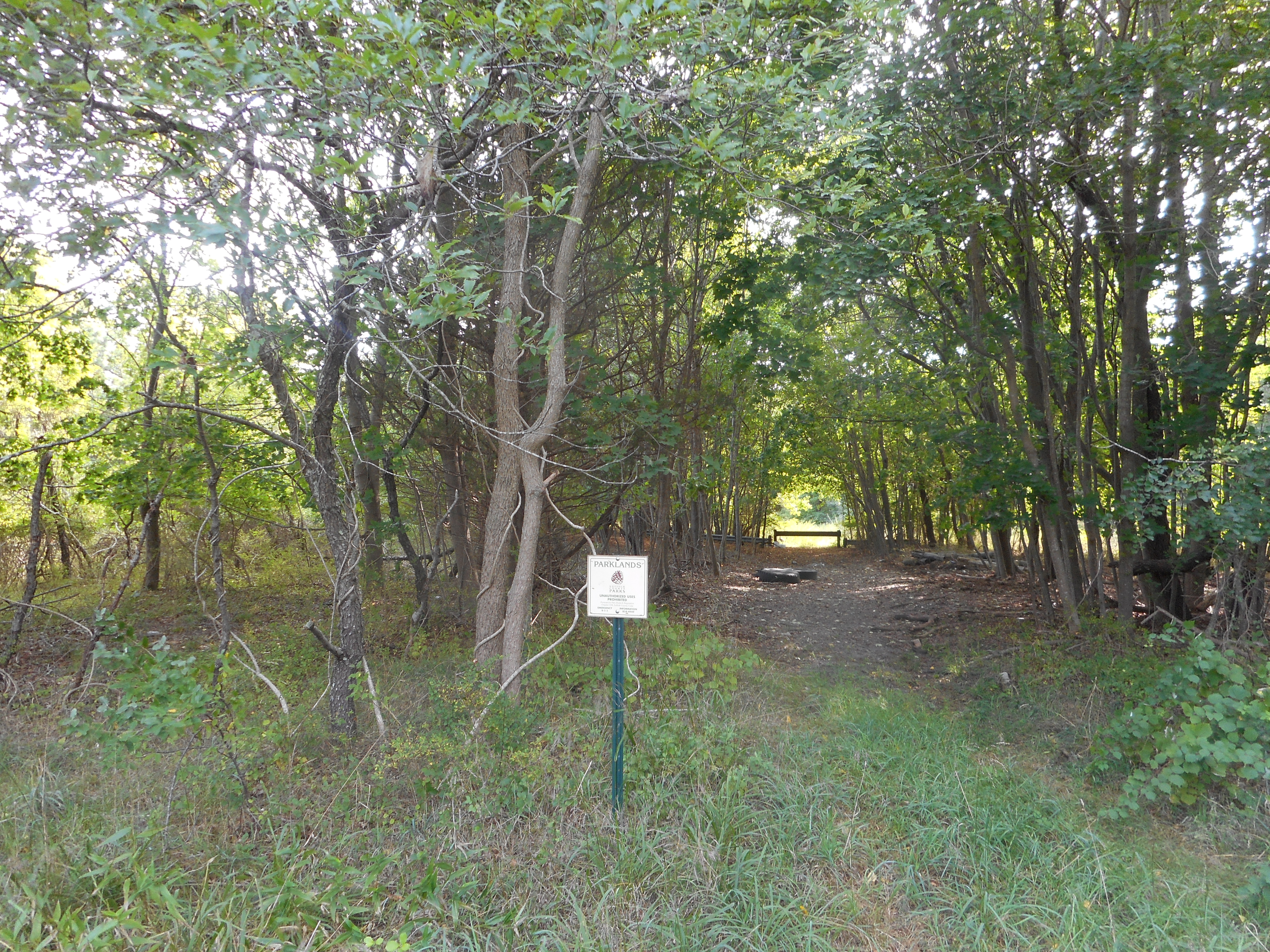
The former road bed as it begins in Manorville

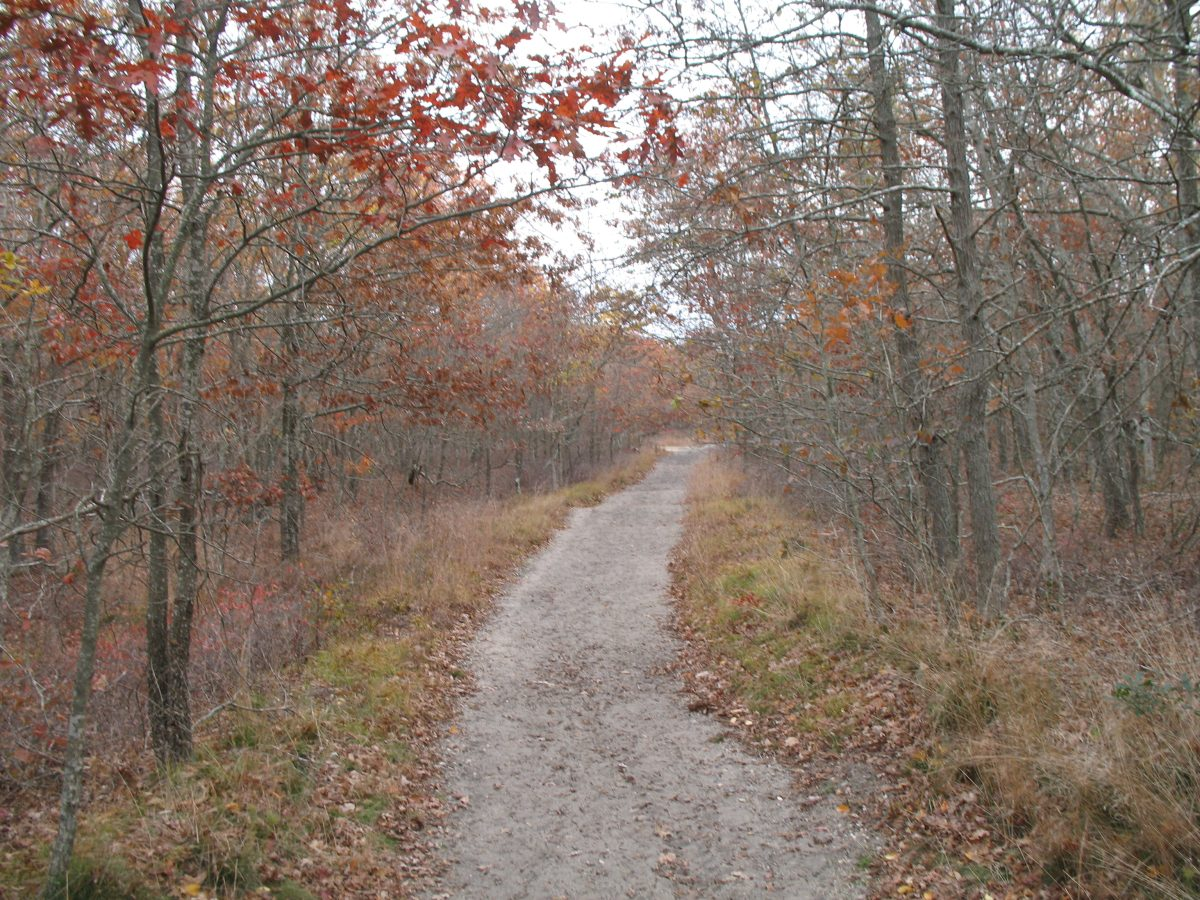
Road bed in the Long Pond Greenbelt

The track that became the Manorville Branch was originally a segment of the Sag Harbor Branch, running from Manorville on the Main Line southeast to Eastport on the Montauk Branch, which eventually became its own branch. A small portion of the right of way runs through what is today the Long Island Game Farm, while another segment runs through a Town of Brookhaven compost facility. In Eastport, the line ran beneath a bridge, which no longer exists, under Suffolk CR 51 then along the north end of Spadaro Airport, before merging with the Montauk Branch. It even contained a wye for westbound Montauk Branch trains that went over Montauk Highway until 1931.

The Manorville Branch was abandoned on December 27, 1949. In the 1950s, Suffolk County Department of Public Works planned to transform the former branch into a four-lane highway called Suffolk County Road 91 (Manorville Branch Road), but this proposal was abandoned on June 24, 1986, and as with the Long Pond Greenbelt, this road bed is also now a hiking trail.

== Stations ==
The two branches are connected via the Montauk Branch. The Manorville Branch was abandoned in 1949, while the Sag Harbor Branch was abandoned in 1939.

Station	Miles (km) from Penn Station	Date opened	Date closed	Connections / notes
For continuing service to Jamaica and points west, see Main Line (Ronkonkoma Branch)
Manorville	67.0 (108.0)	June 14, 1845	1968	Originally St. George's Manor, then Manor
Eastport	72.3 (116.4)	1870	October 6, 1958	Originally Moriches, station moved in 1881
See Montauk Branch for interim stations
Noyack Road		1906	May 3, 1939	Originally Lamb's Corner
Sag Harbor		1870	May 3, 1939	
