= Sag Harbor station =

Former train station in New York, US

Sag Harbor
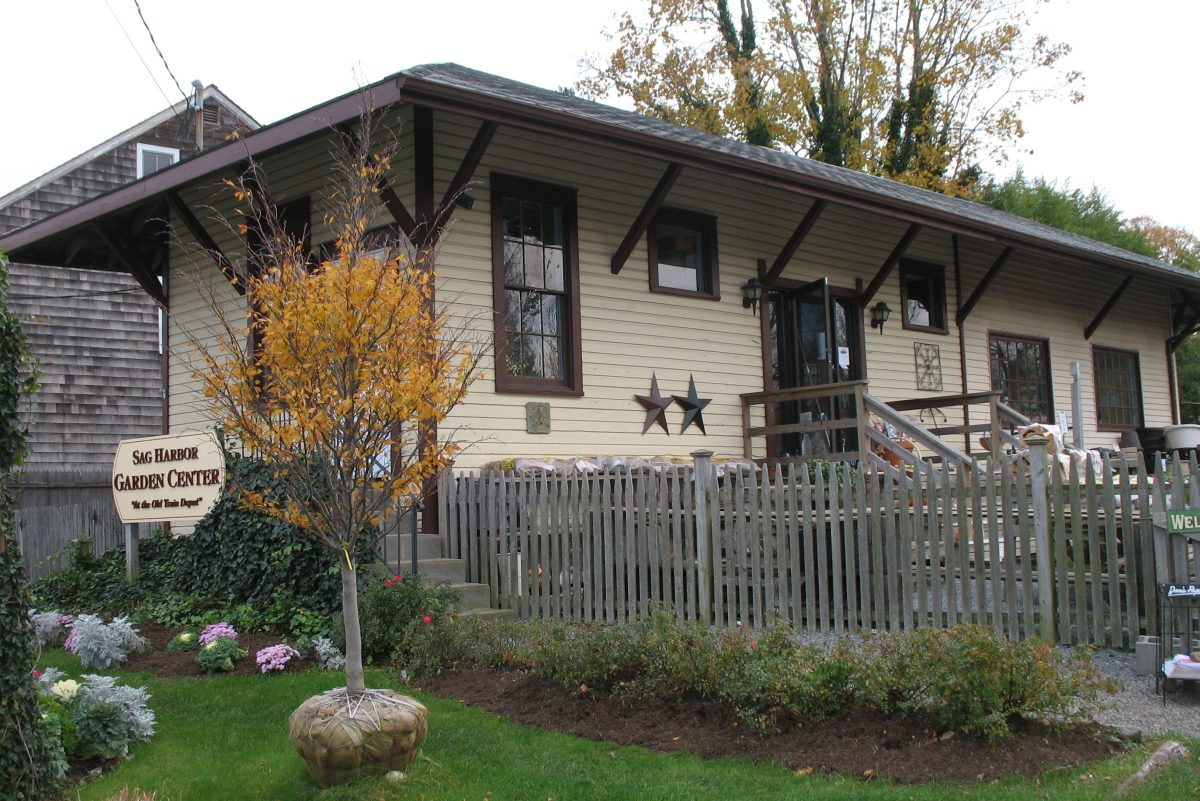
- The former Sag Harbor Station "express house"

General information
- Location: Sag Harbor, New York
- Coordinates: 41.0019°N 72.2965°W (1909 passenger station)
- Line: Sag Harbor Branch
- Platforms: 2 side platforms

History
- Opened: 1870
- Closed: May 3, 1939

Former services
Preceding station	Long Island Rail Road	Following station
Noyack Road toward Manorville	Sag Harbor Branch	Terminus
Location

Sag Harbor was the terminus of the abandoned Sag Harbor Branch of the Long Island Rail Road, and was one of two stations located within the Village of Sag Harbor, in Suffolk County, New York, United States.

== History ==
The Sag Harbor station opened in 1870 with the arrival of the LIRR into Sag Harbor. It was the eastern terminus of the LIRR on the South Fork of Long Island until 1895, when the Brooklyn and Montauk Railroad built a line from Bridgehampton to Montauk, thereby converting the line into a spur north of Bridgehampton.

Besides the standard passenger depot, the Sag Harbor station also contained a freight house and "express building," two yards, a spur to "Long Wharf" (which was owned by the LIRR affiliated Montauk Steamboat Company), a coal trestle, a turntable, and a three-story grain storage building owned by The station was rebuilt in 1909 in a manner similar to such stations as Riverhead, Bay Shore, Manhasset, and Bayside stations, among others. During World War I, it was used to transport torpedoes to Long Wharf in order to test them. It was abandoned in 1939 along with the branch.

Today, Long Wharf is Suffolk County Road 81, and the former freight house became the Sag Harbor Garden Center's retail store until February 1, 2022, when renovations began to transform to building into Kidd Squid Brewing Company's flagship tasting room, which opened in July 2022 and continues in operation today.

== See also ==
- History of the Long Island Rail Road
- List of Long Island Rail Road stations
- Water Mill station

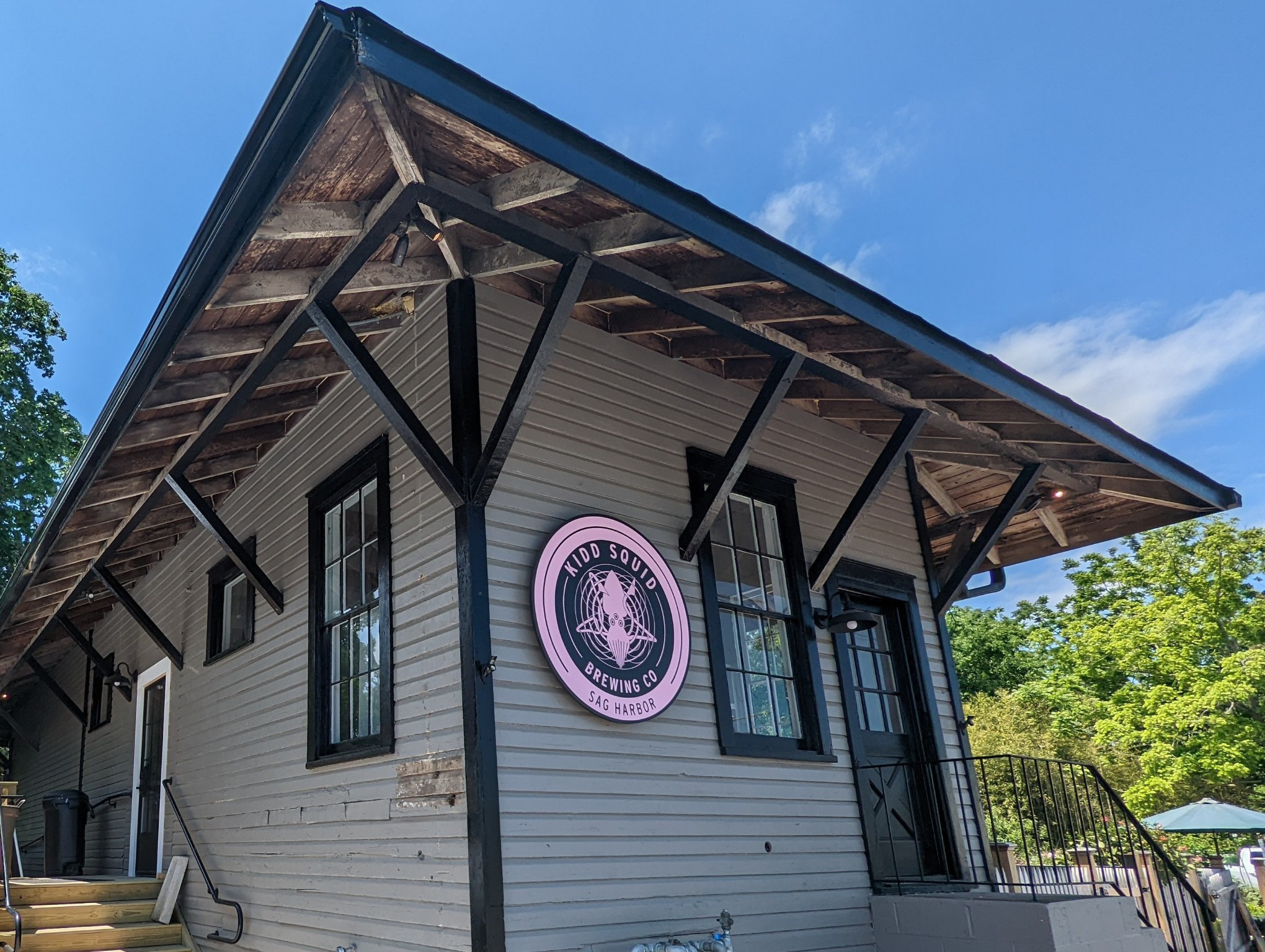
Current use of the Sag Harbor freight house as the flagship tasting room for the Kidd Squid Brewing Company.
