= Manorville station =

Former train station in New York, US

Manorville
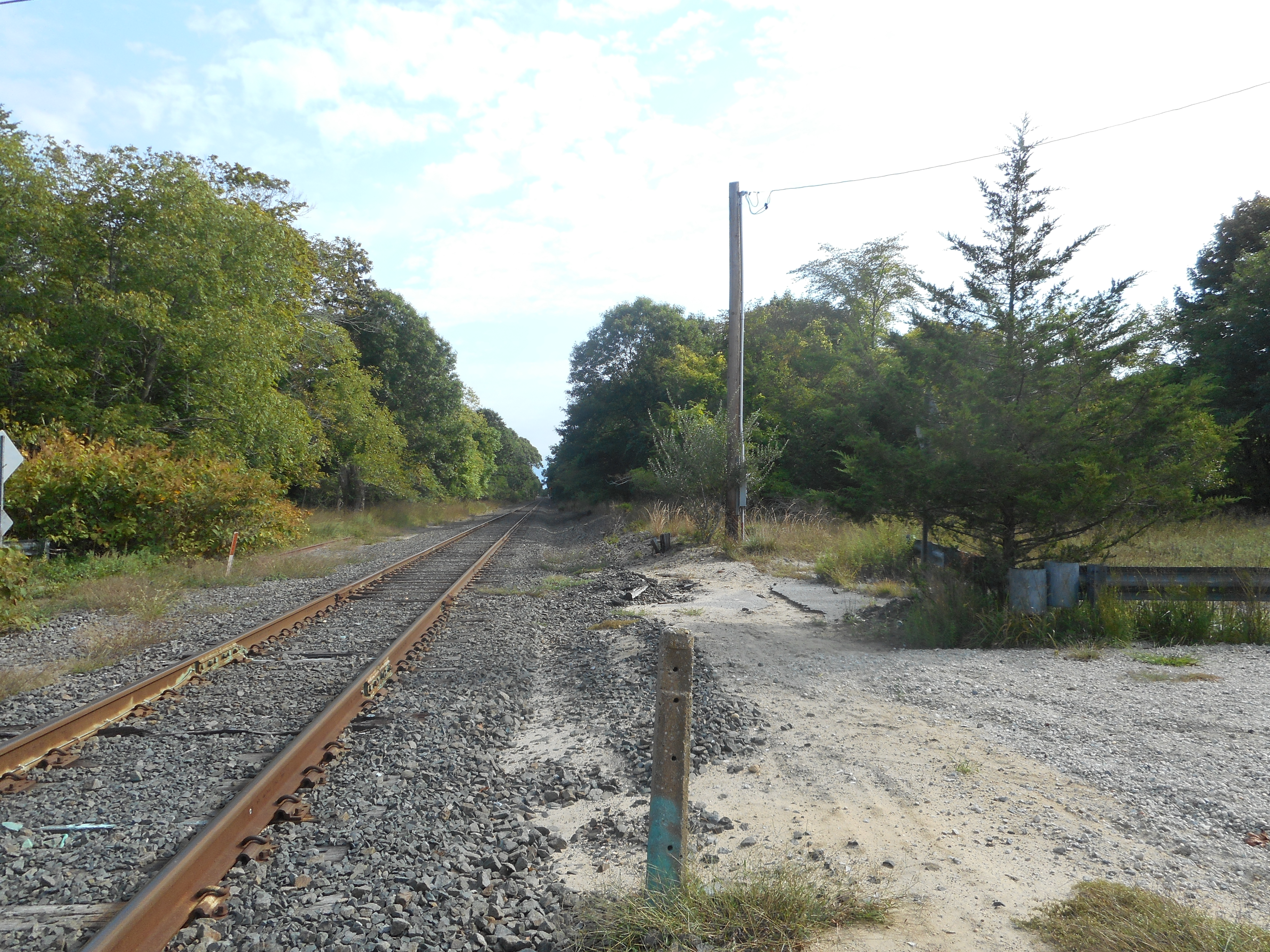
- The former Manorville LIRR station site just east of the Ryerson Avenue grade crossing.

General information
- Location: LIRR at Ryerson Avenue, Manorville, New York
- Coordinates: 40.874819°N 72.808338°W
- Owner: Long Island Rail Road
- Lines: Main Line and Manorville Branch

History
- Opened: July 29, 1844
- Closed: 1968
- Former names: St. George's Manor; Manor

Former services
| Preceding station | Long Island Rail Road | Following station |
|---|---|---|
| Yaphank toward Long Island City or Penn Station | Main Line | Calverton toward Greenport |
| Terminus | Sag Harbor Branch | Eastport toward Sag Harbor |
Location

Manorville was a railroad station on the Main Line of the Long Island Rail Road in Manorville, New York. The station was built in 1844 and closed in 1968.

== History ==
Manorville station originally opened on July 29, 1844 as "St. George’s Manor" station, and later shortened to "Manor Station." According to local history, the first station agent, Seth Raynor, who was a patriot during the American Revolutionary War, painted over the "St. George’s," leaving "Manor" exposed, because it reminded him of colonial domination. The town name changed to Manorville with opening of the post office, but timetables and LIRR documents retained the name "Manor" until either 1907 or 1908.

The first station house was razed in September 1869, the same year that Manorville became the western terminus of the Sag Harbor Branch, which was built by Oliver Charlick to prevent the South Side Railroad of Long Island from extending its main line east of Patchogue. After the LIRR acquired the SSRRLI, Charlick extended the now Brooklyn and Montauk Railroad to Eastport station in 1881, and when the Montauk Branch was extended between Bridgehampton to Montauk in 1895, this section between Manorville and Eastport was renamed the Manorville Branch. Manorville was also intended to be the terminus of one of two formerly proposed extensions of the Wading River Branch. The second station house was built in May 1871, and was finally renamed "Manorville" approximately in 1910. This station was razed in June 1941 and replaced with a sheltered shed. By 1949, the Manorville Branch was abandoned. The station was finally razed in 1968 and discontinued as a station stop. A former hotel and restaurant now known as The Maples Inn, which served commuters from both branches, still exists to this day.
