= Atlantic Double Dunes =

- Atlantic Double Dunes
- Location within New York
- Nearest city: Amagansett
- Coordinates: 40.9684°N 72.122°W
- Area: 35 acres (14 ha)
- Established: 1968
- Governing body: United States Fish and Wildlife Service
- Website: westchesterlandtrust.org/preserves/otter-creek-preserve/

The Atlantic Double Dunes are located in Amagansett, New York. The dunes are one of the largest undeveloped barrier beach's on Long Island Acquired in 1968 the Dunes are managed by the United States Fish and Wildlife Service. In 1902 the Amagansett Lifesaving Station was established on the dunes, witch was later decommissioned in 1944. In 1968 President Lyndon Baines Johnson declared the area a National Wildlife Refuge with the Amagansett Lifesaving Station being moved inland. In 2014 there was a proposal to allow for a board walk to be built that was initially rejected.
