= Nostrand Avenue station (LIRR) =

Long Island Rail Road station in Brooklyn, New York

Nostrand Ave
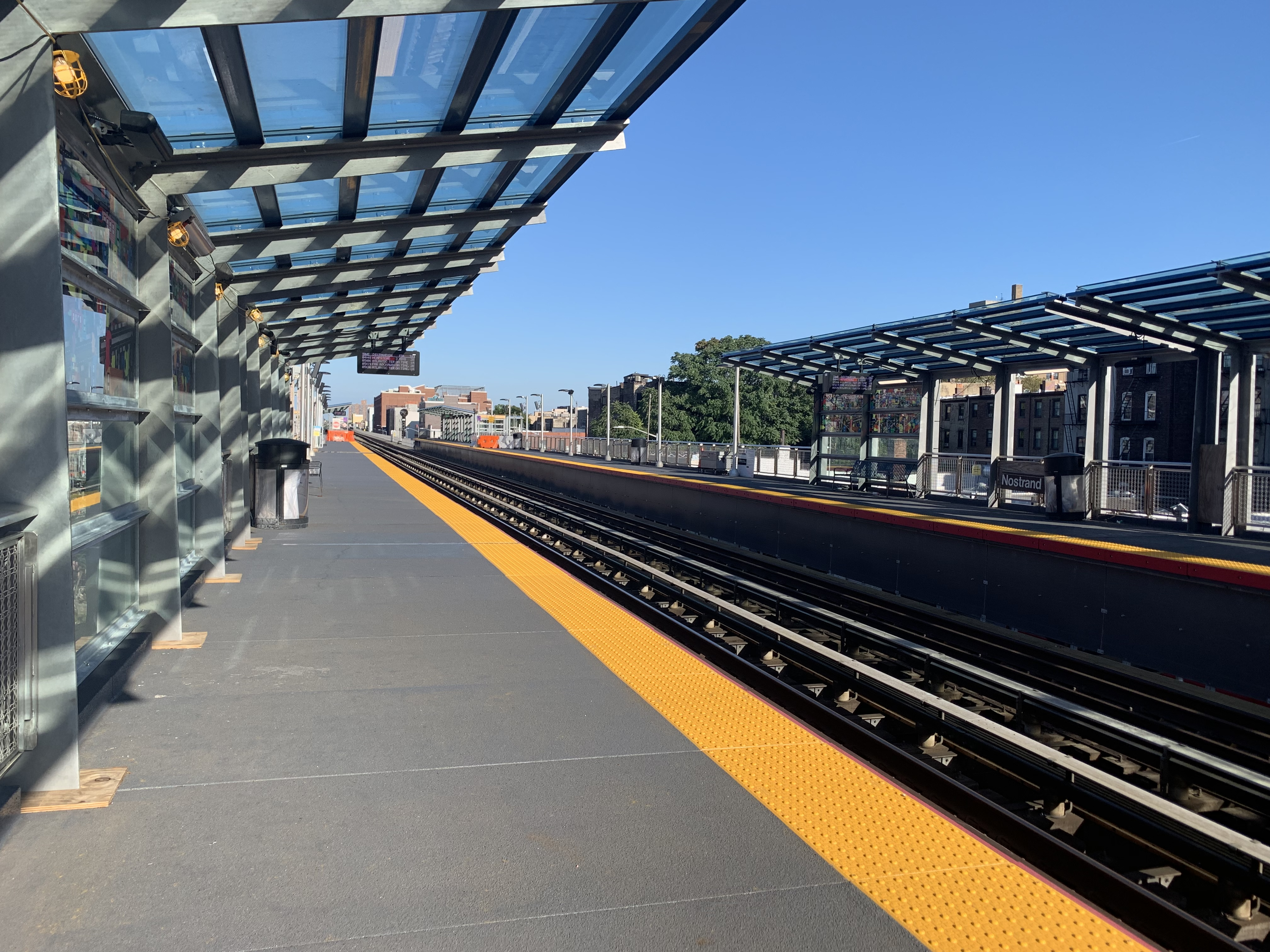
- The Nostrand Avenue LIRR station, as seen in 2019, during renovations

General information
- Location: Nostrand & Atlantic Avenues; Bedford–Stuyvesant, Brooklyn, New York 11216
- Coordinates: 40.67845°N 73.94940°W
- Owner: Long Island Rail Road
- Line: Atlantic Branch
- Distance: 1.6 mi (2.6 km) from Atlantic Terminal
- Platforms: 2 side platforms
- Tracks: 2
- Connections: New York City Subway: at Nostrand Avenue (two blocks north); NYCT Bus: B25, B44, B44 SBS, B65

Construction
- Accessible: yes

Other information
- Station code: NAV
- Fare zone: 1

History
- Opened: August 13, 1877; 149 years ago
- Rebuilt: 1905; 2018–2020
- Electrified: July 26, 1905; 750 V (DC) third rail

Passengers
- 2012—2014: 1,217 per weekday
- Rank: 69 of 125

Services
Preceding station	Long Island Rail Road	Following station
Atlantic Terminal Terminus	City Terminal Zone Brooklyn Shuttle	East New York toward Jamaica
Atlantic Terminal Terminus	West Hempstead Branch Weekdays only	East New York toward West Hempstead
Atlantic Terminal Terminus	Hempstead Branch Peak periods only	East New York toward Hempstead
Atlantic Terminal Terminus	Babylon Branch Peak periods only	East New York toward Babylon
Former services
Preceding station	Brooklyn Rapid Transit	Following station
Atlantic Avenue toward Park Row	Union Elevated Fifth Avenue Line 1899–1905	Manhattan Crossing toward Rockaway Park
Location

Nostrand Avenue is an elevated station on the Long Island Rail Road's Atlantic Branch in the Bedford–Stuyvesant neighborhood of Brooklyn, New York City. Trains leave every 12–15 minutes during peak hours and 30 minutes during off-peak hours until 11 p.m.

Despite being a commuter rail stop, the Nostrand Avenue station resembles a typical elevated New York City Subway station. Before the renovations began in 2018, the station featured white-on-black signage as found on the subway. They have since been replaced with black-on-white signage as seen at all other LIRR stations.

== History ==
Though originally built in 1877, the current elevated station was built between 1903 and 1905.

Between 2018 and 2020, the station underwent an extensive reconstruction project. The project included the installation of two elevators, one for each platform, bringing the station into compliance with the Americans with Disabilities Act of 1990. The project was completed in January 2020.

== Station layout ==
The station has two tracks and two six-car-long side platforms above Atlantic Avenue. A street stair is at either extreme ends of both platforms. The western stairs go down to either of the eastern corners of Nostrand Avenue, while the eastern stairs go down to either of the western corners of New York Avenue. A ticket booth and two daily ticket machines are located at the Nostrand Avenue end of the eastbound platform.
