= Sunnyside station (New York) =

Proposed commuter rail station in Queens, New York

Sunnyside

General information
- Location: Queens Boulevard and Skillman Avenue; Sunnyside, Queens, New York
- Coordinates: 40.7464°N 73.9353°W
- Owner: Long Island Rail Road
- Line: Northeast Corridor
- Platforms: 1 island platform 2 side platforms
- Tracks: 9
- Connections: New York City Subway: trains at Queens Plaza train at 33rd Street–Rawson Street trains at Queensboro Plaza

Construction
- Accessible: yes

Other information
- Fare zone: 1

Proposed Services
Preceding station	Long Island Rail Road	Following station
Penn Station Terminus	City Terminal Zone	Woodside toward Long Island
Preceding station	Metro-North Railroad	Following station
Penn Station Terminus	New Haven Line	Hunts Point toward Stamford
Location

Sunnyside station is a proposed commuter rail station to be served by the Long Island Rail Road and the Metro-North Railroad. Located in the Sunnyside neighborhood of Queens, New York, approximately one-half mile from the Harold Interlocking, the station would be located within the City Terminal Zone. The proposed location of the station is at Queens Boulevard and Skillman Avenue.

== History ==
=== Original station ===
In the late 19th century, the LIRR had another Sunnyside Station, which was built by their subsidiary Newtown and Flushing Railroad, better known as the "White Line." This short-lived line was designed to compete with the Flushing and North Side Railroad in 1873. When the F&NS was consolidated into the LIRR, along with the Central Railroad of Long Island and South Side Railroad of Long Island, the White Line was dissolved, along with the original Sunnyside station.

=== Proposed station ===
Though no direct connection to other mass transit services are known, the nearest existing subway stations are at 33rd Street–Rawson Street on the IRT Flushing Line (7 train), Queensboro Plaza on the IRT Flushing Line and BMT Astoria Line (7, <7>, N and W trains), and Queens Plaza on the IND Queens Boulevard Line (E, F, <F>, and R trains).

Construction for the station was deemed to be impossible until East Side Access was completed, as the yard was being redeveloped at the time. The station is classified as a high priority under the Sunnyside Yard Master Plan.

The MTA later proposed in their 2025-2044 20-year needs assessment that Sunnyside station serve both the LIRR and the Metro-North Railroad, with the latter providing service to Penn Station after Penn Station Access is completed.

== Proposed station layout ==
This station will have three high-level platforms, with one island platform and two side platforms.
