= East New York station =

Long Island Rail Road station in Brooklyn, New York

East New York
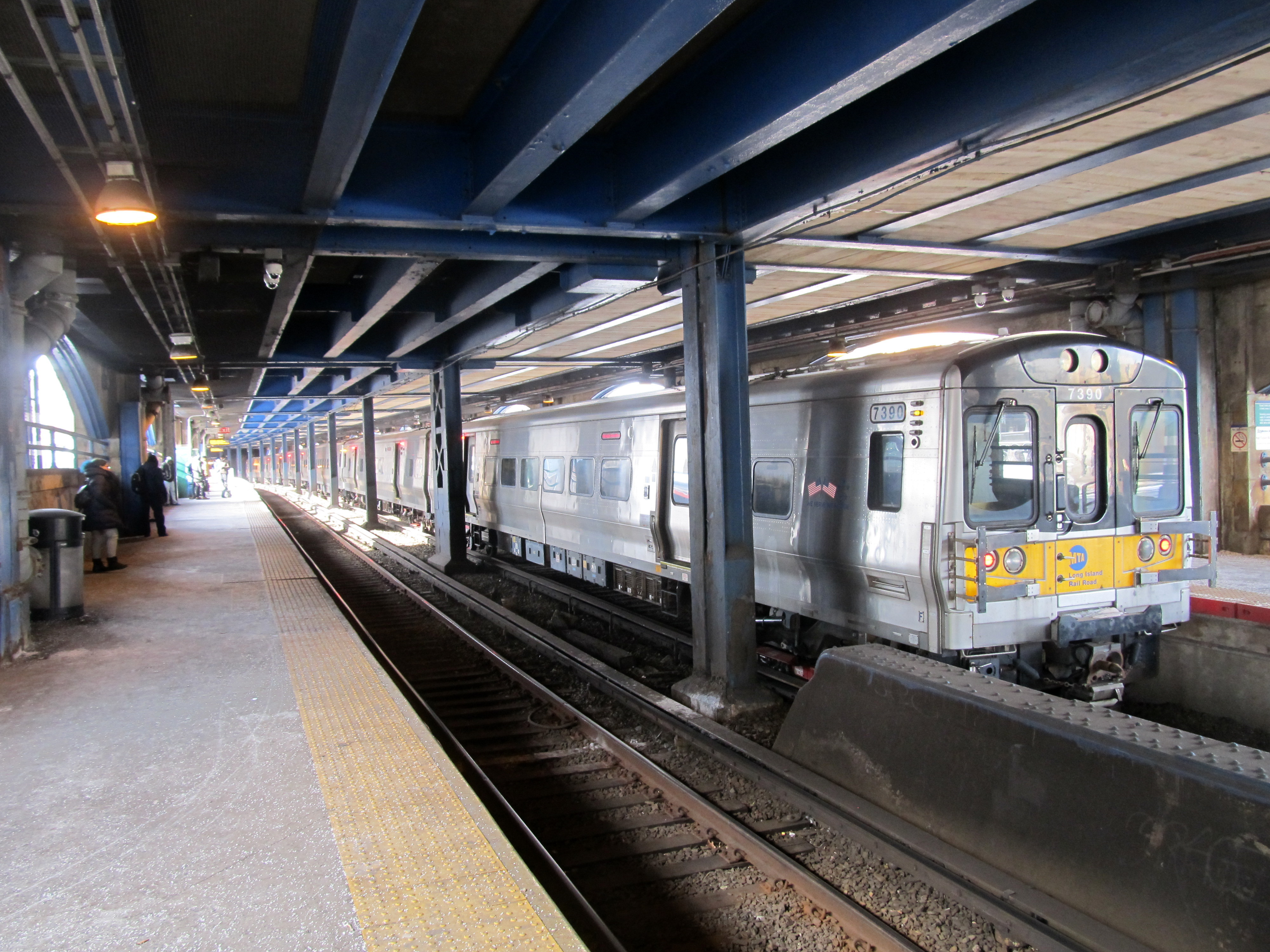
- An Atlantic Terminal-bound train at the East New York station in 2017

General information
- Location: Atlantic Avenue & Havens Place; East New York, Brooklyn, New York 11207
- Coordinates: 40.676053°N 73.905925°W
- Owner: Long Island Rail Road
- Line: Atlantic Branch
- Distance: 4.0 mi (6.4 km) from Atlantic Terminal
- Platforms: 2 side platforms
- Tracks: 2
- Connections: New York City Subway: at Atlantic Avenue at Broadway Junction; NYCT Bus: B12, B20, B25, B83, Q24, Q56

Construction
- Accessible: No; accessibility planned

Other information
- Station code: ENY
- Fare zone: 1

History
- Opened: 1878
- Closed: 1924 (Bay Ridge Branch platforms)
- Former names: Manhattan Beach Railroad Crossing

Passengers
- 2012—2014: 1,358 daily
- Rank: 66 of 125

Services
Preceding station	Long Island Rail Road	Following station
Nostrand Avenue toward Atlantic Terminal	City Terminal Zone Atlantic shuttle	Jamaica Terminus
Nostrand Avenue toward Atlantic Terminal	West Hempstead Branch	Jamaica toward West Hempstead
Nostrand Avenue toward Atlantic Terminal	Hempstead Branch Peak periods only	Jamaica toward Hempstead
Nostrand Avenue toward Atlantic Terminal	Babylon Branch Peak periods only	Jamaica toward Babylon
Former services
Preceding station	Long Island Rail Road	Following station
Nostrand Avenue toward Flatbush Avenue	Atlantic Division	Woodhaven toward Valley Stream
Rugby Closed 1924 toward Bay Ridge	Bay Ridge Branch	Cypress Avenue Closed 1924 toward Fresh Pond
New Lots Road Closed 1897 toward Bay Ridge	Bay Ridge Branch	Bushwick Avenue Closed 1915 toward Fresh Pond
Preceding station	Brooklyn Rapid Transit	Following station
Nostrand Avenue toward Park Row	Union Elevated Fifth Avenue Line 1899–1905	Howard House toward Rockaway Park
Location

East New York is a station on the Long Island Rail Road's Atlantic Branch in the East New York and Ocean Hill neighborhoods of Brooklyn, New York City, where that branch passes through the Jamaica Pass. It is generally served by the West Hempstead Branch and the City Terminal Zone Atlantic Branches of the LIRR.

The station was formerly also served the LIRR's Bay Ridge Branch, until passenger service on that branch ended in 1924. In the future, the Interborough Express, which will operate along the Bay Ridge Branch, will serve this station.

== History ==
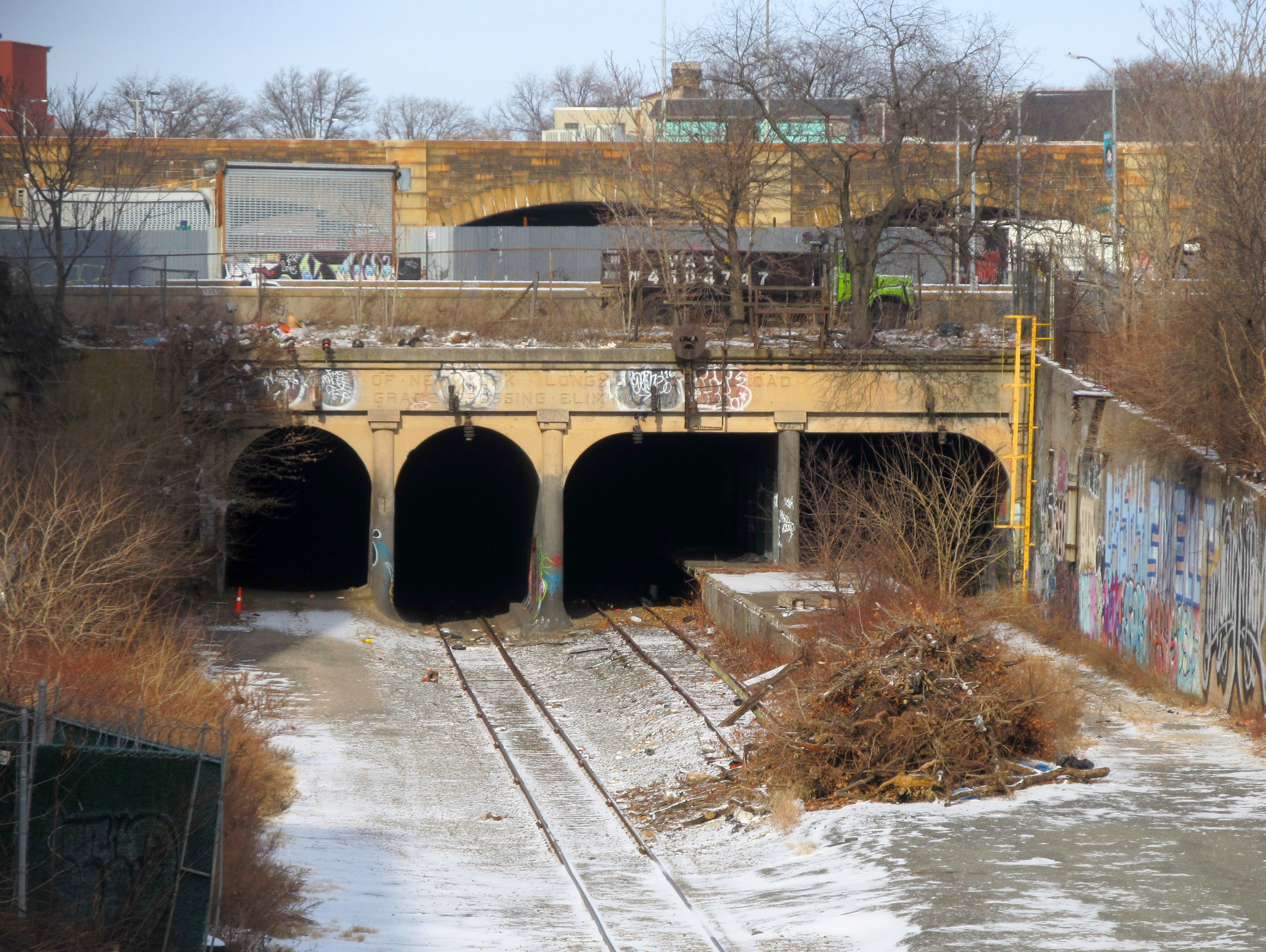
Abandoned platform on the Bay Ridge Branch

When the Brooklyn and Jamaica Railroad opened in April 1836, under lease to the LIRR, it did not include a station at East New York. The LIRR began stopping at East New York by early 1843, eventually stopping at the Howard House at Alabama Avenue, shared with all the other horse car and steam lines into East New York. From 1861 to 1877, East New York served as the west end of steam service along the Atlantic Branch.

By 1878, local Atlantic Avenue rapid transit trains began stopping at a new station, Manhattan Beach Railroad Crossing, at the New York and Manhattan Beach Railway crossing at Van Sinderen Avenue. This later became the main East New York station, with only these local trains stopping at Howard House. The Atlantic Avenue Improvement, completed in 1905, resulted in the closing of the Howard House station, and the expanded Manhattan Crossing station was renamed East New York. The elevated Warwick Street station, 18 blocks east, was also labeled as serving East New York; it closed in 1939, when the elevated railway east of East New York was buried in the current tunnel.

East New York was also a station on the New York and Manhattan Beach Railway, now the Bay Ridge Branch, from its opening in July 1877 until May 1924, when passenger service on the branch ended. It was initially at grade level where the lines crossed, but was placed in a tunnel in 1915; the platforms, under East New York Avenue, still exist. Until the 1930s, a grade-level freight connection existed in the southeast quadrant between the two lines.

In 1924, the station was the location of a firework accident that resulted in Palsgraf v. Long Island Railroad Co., an oft-cited court case on the doctrine of proximate cause.

In the 2010s, many locals and elected officials such as Brooklyn's then-borough president, Eric Adams, advocated for renovations to the station, including bringing it into compliance with the Americans with Disabilities Act of 1990.

As part of the 2025–2029 MTA Capital Program, the East New York station will undergo a station-wide renewal project and be made compliant with the Americans with Disabilities Act of 1990, thus making the station wheelchair accessible.

== Station layout ==
The station is located at ground level, in the median of Atlantic Avenue, and underneath the elevated main lanes of Atlantic Avenue, with one eight-car side platform on either side of the two-track line. A closed ticket office is located in the underpass, which has staircases to the southwest corner of East New York and Atlantic Avenues and the northwest corner of Van Sinderen and Atlantic Avenues.

On either side of the station, the tracks descend into a tunnel, allowing the main lanes of Atlantic Avenue to return to the surface.

== Future ==
The East New York station will be served in the future by the Interborough Express (IBX) light rail line. Operating along the LIRR's Bay Ridge Branch, the IBX's proposed Atlantic Avenue station will be connected to the LIRR station and the Atlantic Avenue station on the BMT Canarsie Line.
