= Lindenhurst station =

Long Island Rail Road station in Suffolk County, New York

Lindenhurst
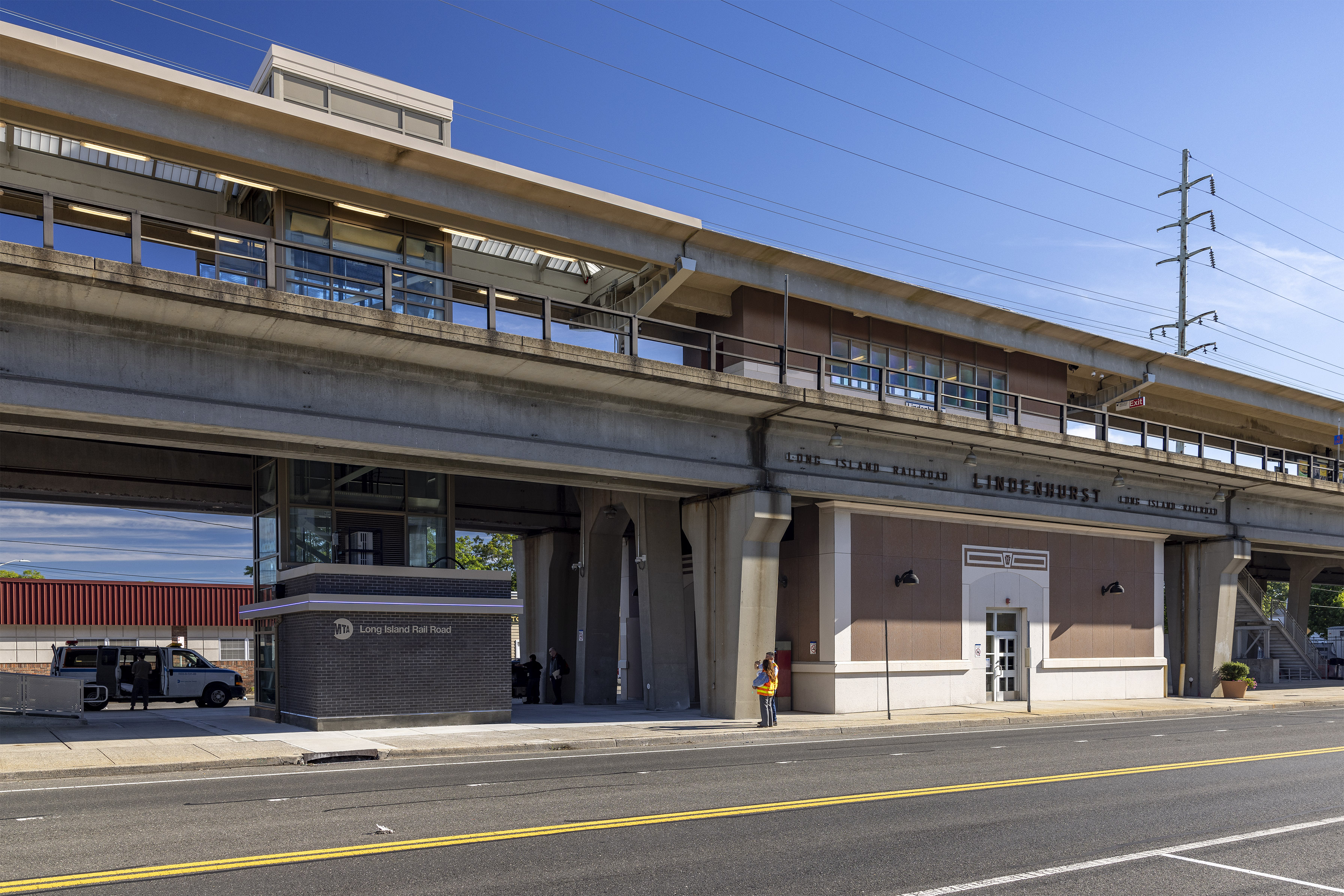
- Lindenhurst station in 2024

General information
- Location: Wellwood Avenue and Hoffman Avenue; Lindenhurst, New York
- Coordinates: 40.6882°N 73.3695°W
- Owner: Long Island Rail Road
- Line: Montauk Branch
- Platforms: 1 island platform
- Tracks: 2
- Connections: Suffolk County Transit: 10

Construction
- Parking: Yes
- Cycle facilities: Yes
- Accessible: Yes

Other information
- Station code: LHT
- Fare zone: 9

History
- Opened: 1867 (SSRRLI)
- Rebuilt: 1902, 1968-1973
- Electrified: May 20, 1925; 750 V (DC) third rail
- Former names: Wellwood (1867–1870); Breslau (1870–July 28, 1891)

Passengers
- 2012—2014: 3,178
- Rank: 36 of 125

Services
Preceding station	Long Island Rail Road	Following station
Copiague toward Penn Station, Grand Central or Atlantic Terminal	Babylon Branch	Babylon Terminus
Montauk Branch does not stop here
Former services
Preceding station	Long Island Rail Road	Following station
Copiague toward Long Island City	Montauk Division	Babylon toward Montauk
At Breslau station
South Farmingdale toward Bethpage	Central Branch	Babylon Terminus
Location

Lindenhurst station is a station on the Babylon Branch of the Long Island Rail Road. It is located at Wellwood Avenue (CR 3) and East Hoffman Avenue (CR 12) in Lindenhurst, Suffolk County, New York.

== History ==
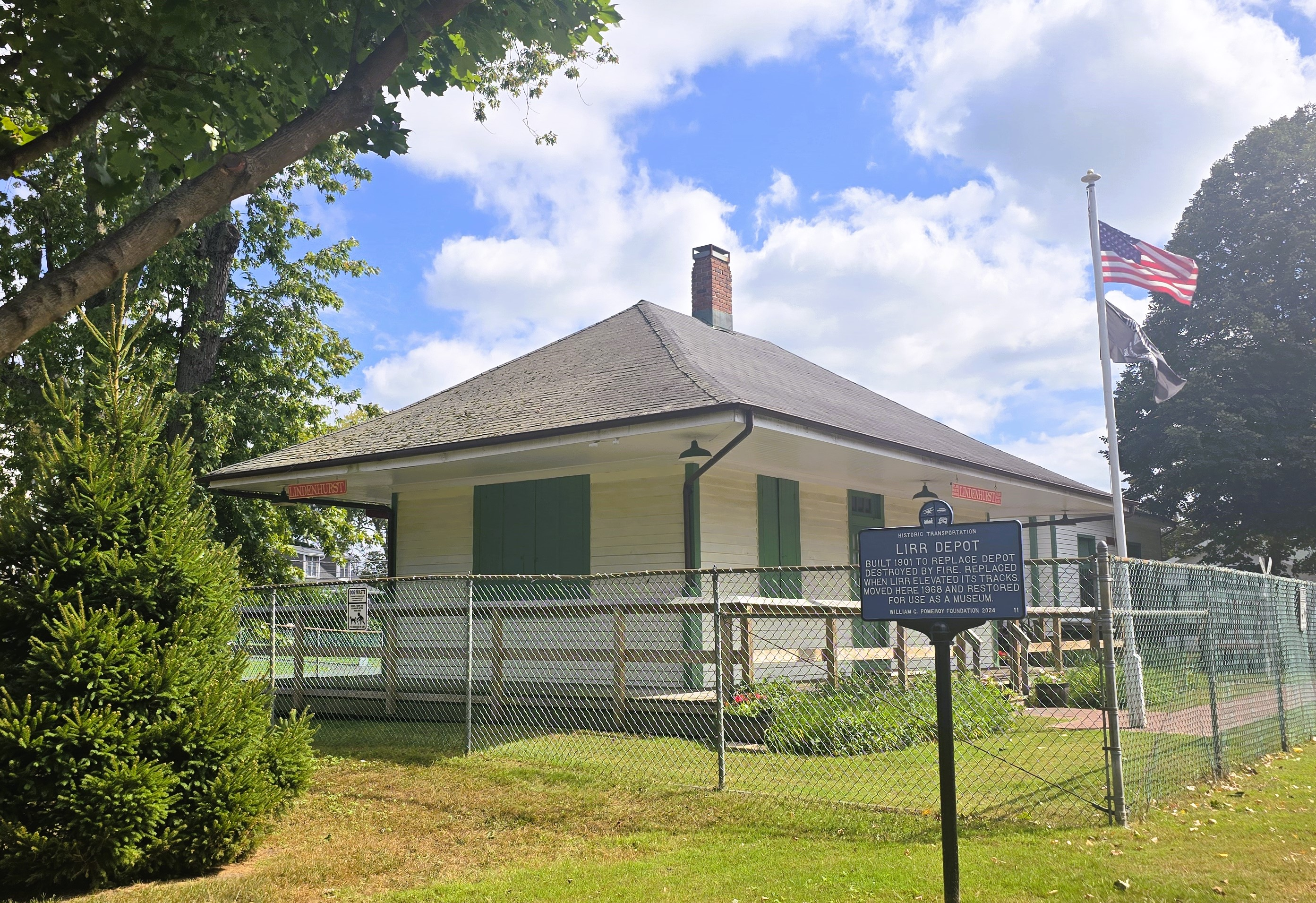
The preserved former station building

Lindenhurst station is typical of the elevated Babylon Branch stations that were rebuilt during the mid-to-late 20th century. It was originally built by the South Side Railroad of Long Island on October 28, 1867 as Wellwood. It was renamed Breslau in 1870, after developers Thomas Welwood and Charles S. Schleier renamed the community after their native Breslau in the German Empire, then was renamed Lindenhurst in 1891. The station burned down on January 22, 1901. The second station was built in 1902.

This station was replaced with a temporary station with high-level platforms on October 25, 1968, when construction of the current elevated station was started. The current elevated station was opened on August 7, 1973, and was renovated in the early 2000s, along with much of the rest of the Babylon line. The 1902 station was moved to a private location and restored as a museum in 1971.

In 2023, the MTA agreed to make the Amityville, Copiague, and Lindenhurst stations wheelchair-accessible to settle a lawsuit. The elevator at Lindenhurst opened on June 28, 2024, making the station compliant with the Americans with Disabilities Act of 1990.

== Station layout ==
The station has one 10-car-long high-level island platform between the two tracks.
