= Hunterspoint Avenue station (LIRR) =

Long Island Rail Road station in Queens, New York

Hunterspoint Ave
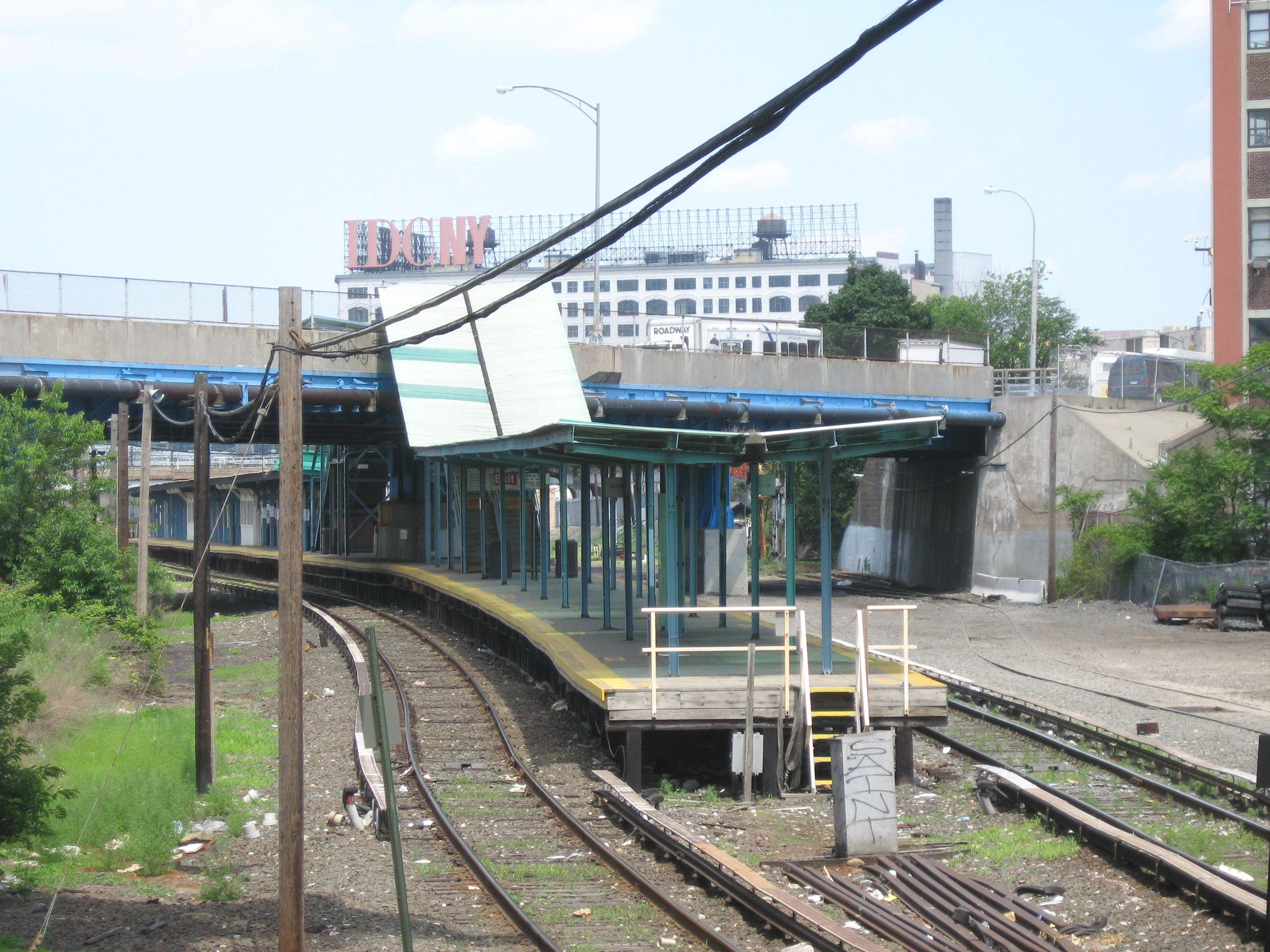
- The western end of the station.

General information
- Location: 49th Avenue between 21st Street and Skillman Avenue; Hunters Point and Long Island City, Queens, New York
- Coordinates: 40°44′32″N 73°56′50″W
- Owner: Long Island Rail Road
- Line: Main Line
- Distance: 0.6 mi (0.97 km) from Long Island City
- Platforms: 1 island platform
- Tracks: 2
- Connections: New York City Subway: at Hunters Point Avenue at 21st Street; NYCT Bus: B32, B62, Q67; MTA Bus: Q101, Q103

Construction
- Parking: No
- Cycle facilities: No
- Accessible: No; accessibility planned

Other information
- Station code: HPA
- Fare zone: 1

History
- Opened: 1860
- Closed: 1902
- Rebuilt: 1903, 1914
- Electrified: June 16, 1910; 750 V (DC) third rail

Passengers
- 2012—2014: 5,224 per weekday

Services
Preceding station	Long Island Rail Road	Following station
Long Island City Terminus	Port Jefferson Branch limited service	Jamaica toward Port Jefferson
Long Island City Terminus	Oyster Bay Branch limited service	Jamaica toward Oyster Bay
Long Island City Terminus	Montauk Branch limited service	Jamaica toward Montauk
Former services
Preceding station	Long Island Rail Road	Following station
Long Island City Terminus	Main Line	Woodside toward Greenport
Location

Hunterspoint Avenue is a station on the Main Line of the Long Island Rail Road, within the City Terminal Zone. It is located at 49th Avenue (formerly Hunters Point Avenue) between 21st Street and Skillman Avenue in the Hunters Point and Long Island City neighborhoods of Queens, New York City. This ground-level station has an island platform between two tracks and is not wheelchair accessible from the entrance above the station.

The Hunterspoint Avenue station is only served during weekday rush hours in the peak direction (to Hunterspoint Avenue from Long Island in the morning; from Hunterspoint Avenue to Long Island in the evening). Trains serving here usually run on the Oyster Bay, Montauk, or Port Jefferson Branches. Some westbound trains continue to and terminate at Long Island City, and some eastbound trains originate in Long Island City. All service at the station is provided by diesel trains, which can neither use the East River Tunnels nor the 63rd Street Tunnel – although the tracks are electrified.

== History ==
The original Hunterspoint Avenue station opened in August 1860, three years before the New York and Flushing Railroad built their own Hunter's Point station.

According to a New York Times article from May 1914, the current station at 49th Avenue was scheduled to open on July 1, 1914. Instead, the reopening date was delayed until October 18, 1914.

In June 1947, only two weekday trains were scheduled east from Hunterspoint Ave, one to Jamaica and one to Queens Village. Trains destined beyond electrified territory could leave Penn Station behind DD1 electric locomotives and change engines at Jamaica; thirteen weekday trains did so. That service ended in 1951, leading to Hunterspoint Avenue's present role.

On November 22, 1948, a 155 foot (47 m)-long extension of the platform went into service.

In the 2010s, it was announced that the station would receive renovations and become compliant with the Americans with Disabilities Act of 1990, as part of the 2015–2019 MTA Capital Program. However, this was pushed back in an amendment from August 2017 until the MTA's 2020–2024 Capital Program.

== Station layout ==
The station has one 10-car long high-level island platform between the two Main Line tracks, with stairways on both sides of 49th Avenue.

== Gallery ==
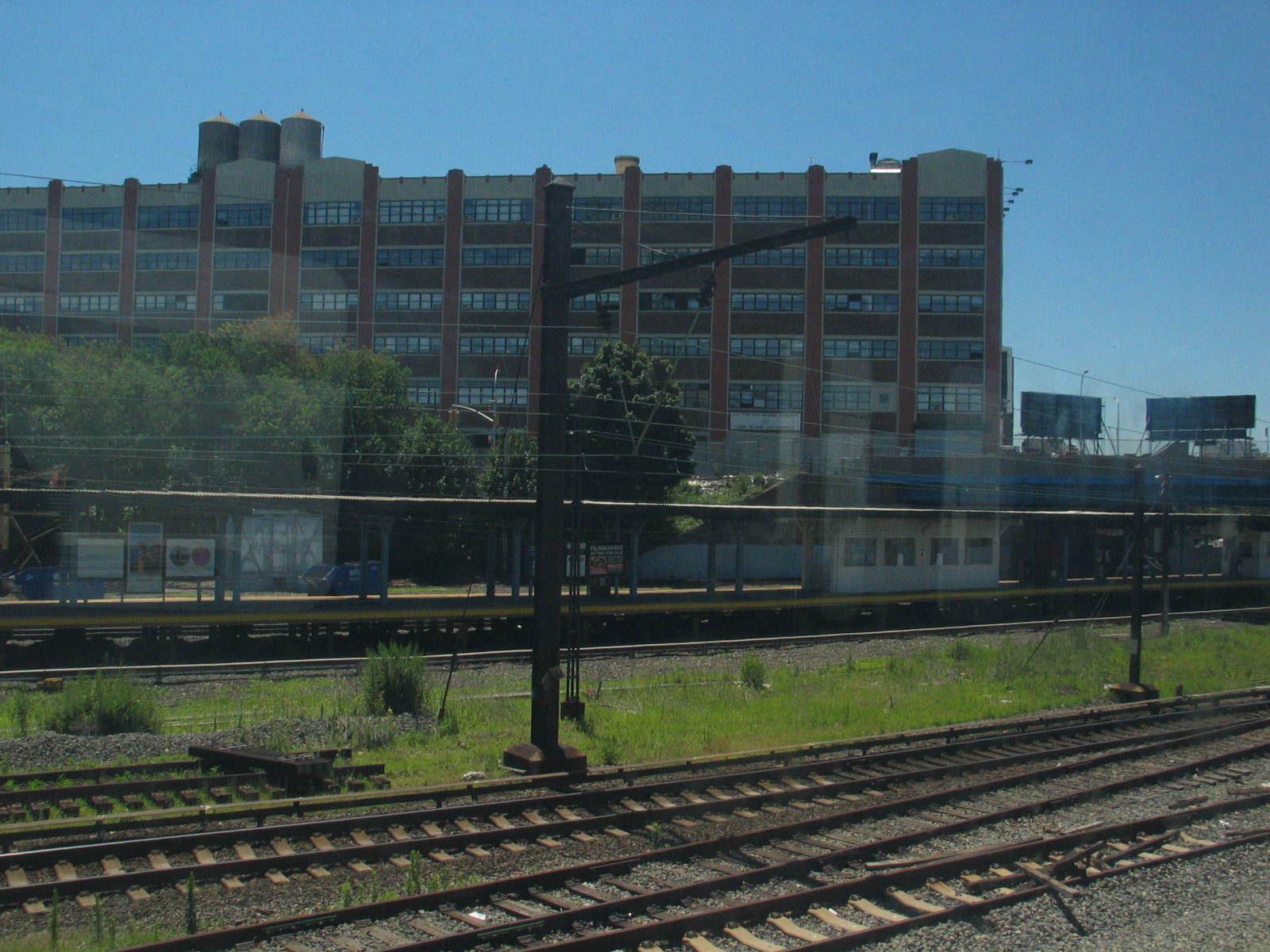
Hunterspoint Avenue station, as seen from IRT Flushing Line subway train.

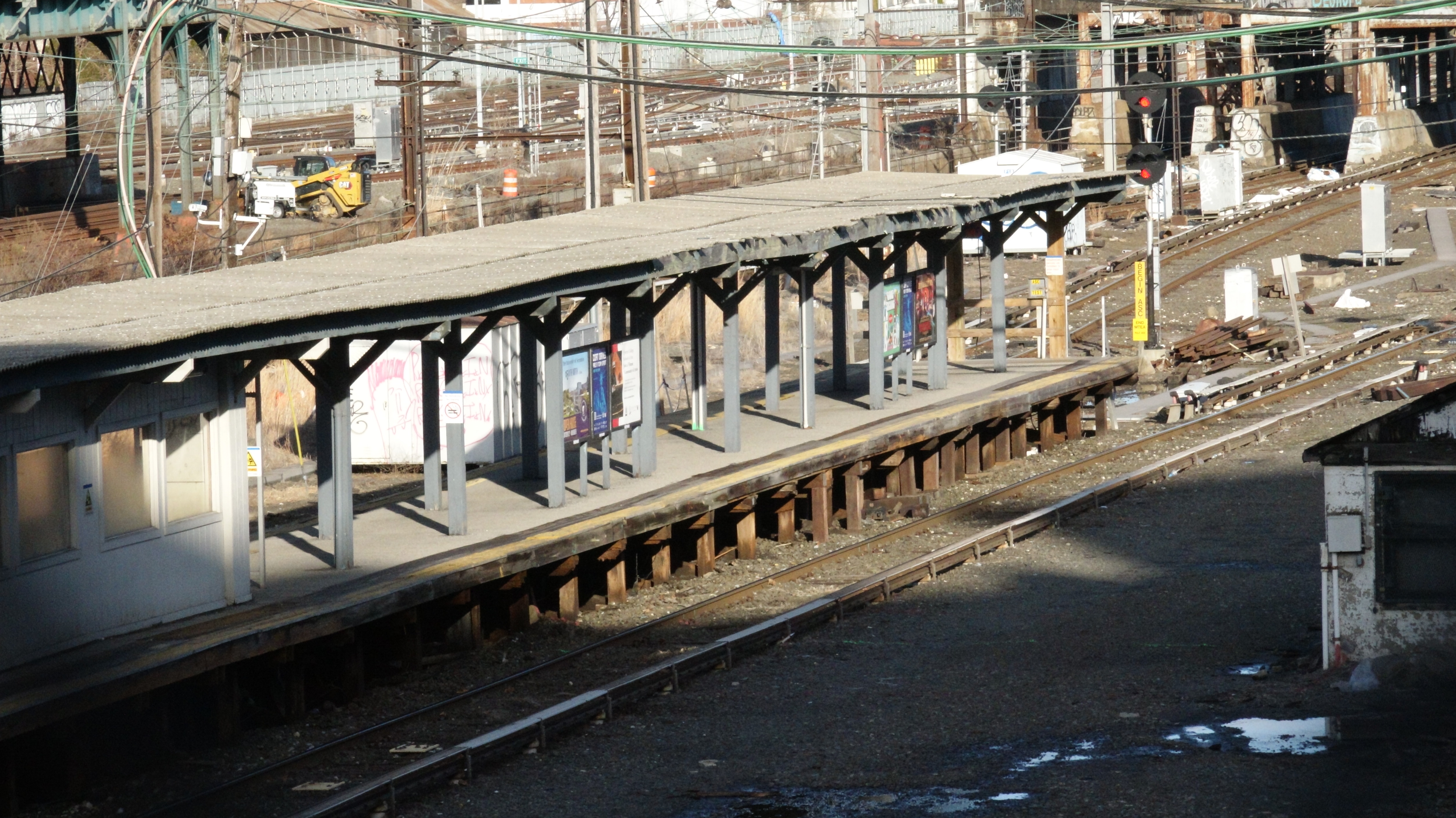
The North end of the station seen from the overpass bridge.

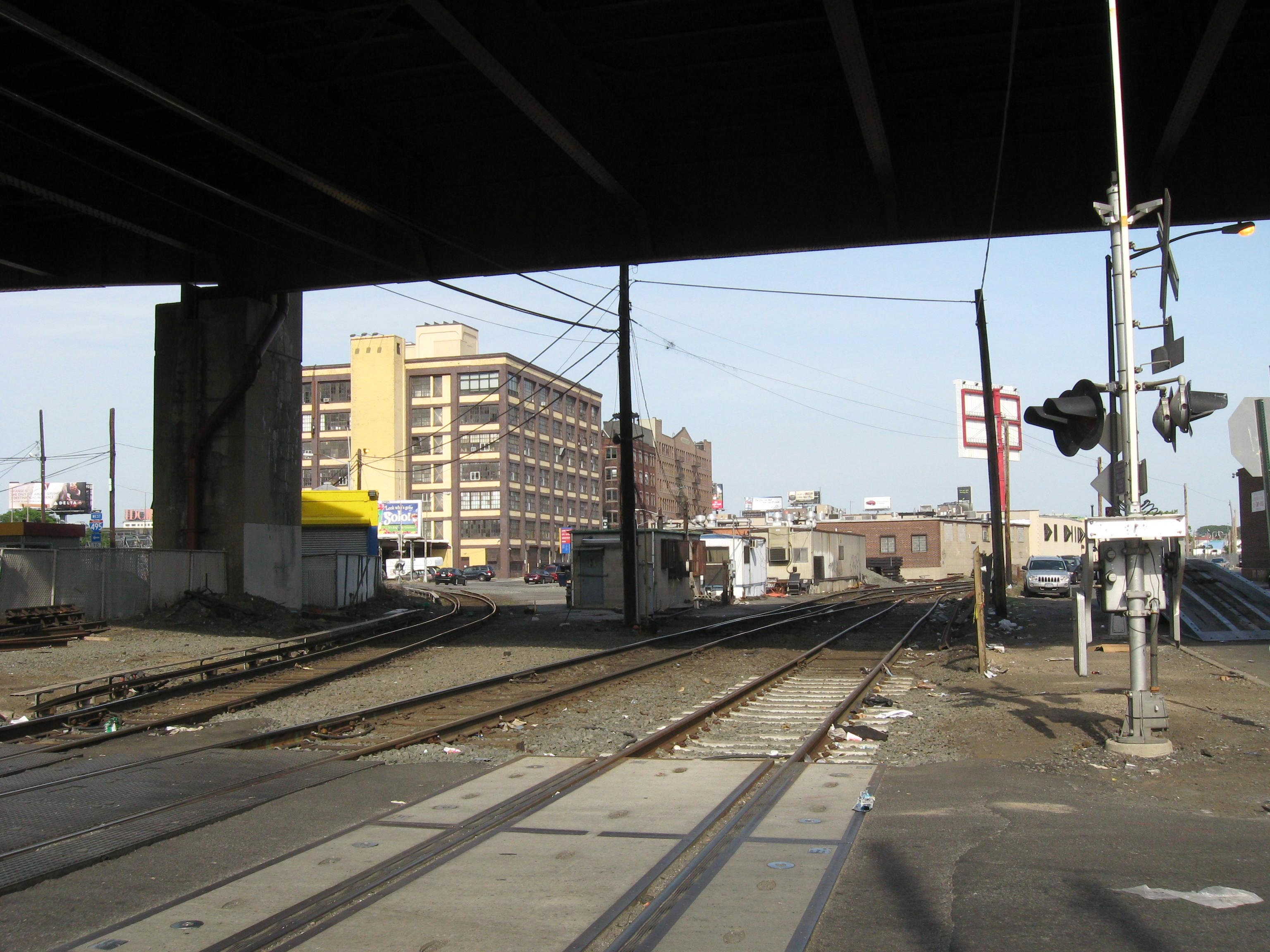
Junction; left branch crosses Borden Avenue to HP station.

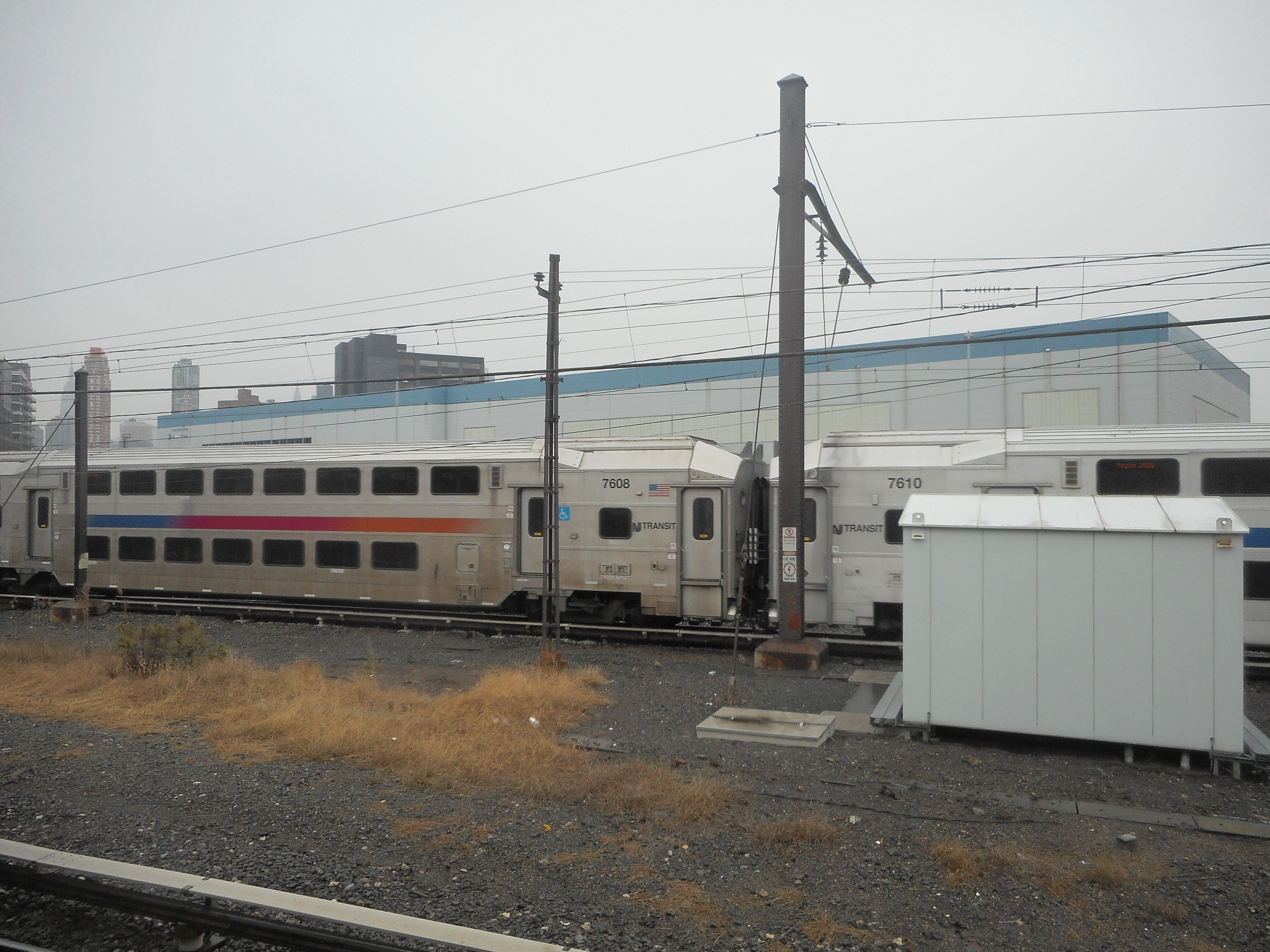
A New Jersey Transit commuter train passes by on the way to Penn Station as it leaves the Sunnyside Yard.

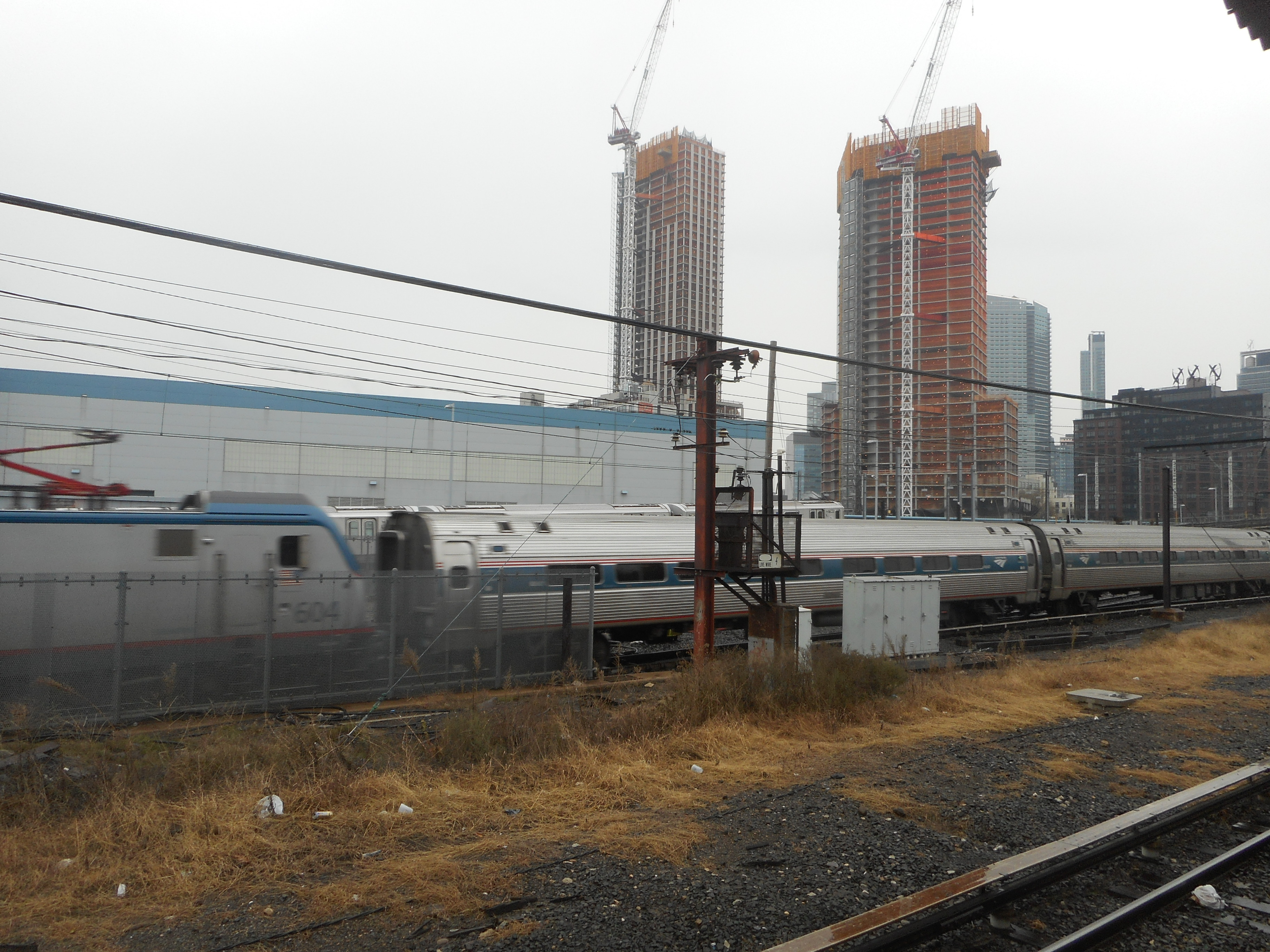
An Amtrak train passes by on the way to Penn Station as it leaves the Sunnyside Yard.

The station as seen from the Long Island Expressway
