= City Terminal Zone =

Collection of Long Island Rail Road branches

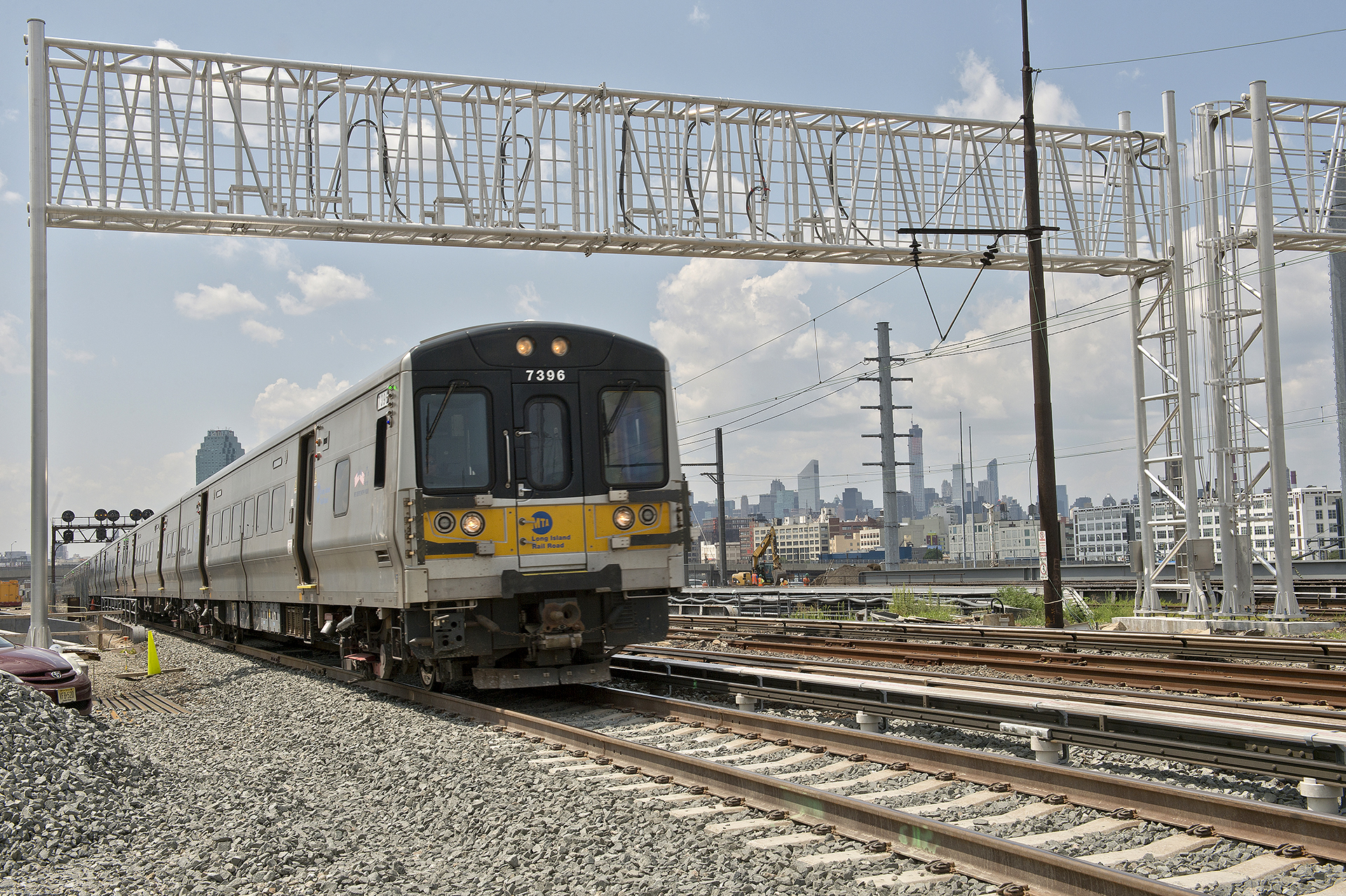
- An M7 near Harold Interlocking within the City Terminal Zone in 2014

Overview
- Status: Operational
- Owner: Long Island Rail Road
- Locale: Long Island, New York, United States
- Termini: Western termini: Atlantic Terminal Hunterspoint Avenue Long Island City Penn Station Grand Central Madison; Eastern termini: Woodside (Port Washington Branch) Jamaica (all other lines)
- Stations: 12 (11 passenger, 1 employees-only); 1 future station

Service
- Type: Commuter rail
- System: Long Island Rail Road
- Services: City Terminal Zone Belmont Park Branch Babylon Branch Far Rockaway Branch Hempstead Branch Long Beach Branch Montauk Branch Oyster Bay Branch Port Jefferson Branch Port Washington Branch Ronkonkoma Branch West Hempstead Branch
- Operator: Long Island Rail Road

Technical
- Track gauge: 4 ft 8 1/2 in (1,435 mm) standard gauge
- Electrification: Third rail, 750 V DC (electrified portions)

The City Terminal Zone is the set of Long Island Rail Road lines within New York City west of Jamaica station – and the Port Washington Branch west of Woodside station.

== Routes ==
=== Current routes ===
There are four routes that are part of the City Terminal Zone:

- New York Penn Station (NYP) – Trains that, from Jamaica, travel west along the Main Line to Penn Station in Manhattan via the East River Tunnels.
- Grand Central Madison (GCM) – Trains that travel along the Main Line to Grand Central Madison via East Side Access, which includes the lower level of the 63rd Street Tunnel and a new tunnel under Park Avenue. Due to clearance restrictions in the tunnel, the C3 bilevel cars cannot access the terminal.
- Atlantic Terminal (AT) – Trains that travel along the Atlantic Branch to Brooklyn.
- Long Island City (LIC) – Trains that serve Hunterspoint Avenue and Long Island City in Queens. These trains also use the Main Line west of Jamaica, but typically skip Woodside, Forest Hills, and Kew Gardens. This route is served only during weekday rush hours in the peak direction (to Long Island City in the morning, from Long Island City in the afternoon).

=== Former routes ===
The City Terminal Zone formerly included the Lower Montauk Branch from Long Island City to Jamaica until passenger service on that route was discontinued in November 2012. This line formerly included Penny Bridge, Haberman, Fresh Pond, Glendale, and Richmond Hill stations until they were closed in March 1998.

== Stations ==
East of Jamaica, trains continue in Long Island on the Main Line (Hempstead, Oyster Bay, Port Jefferson, Ronkonkoma), Atlantic Branch (Far Rockaway and Long Beach), and Montauk Branch (West Hempstead, Babylon, Montauk).

The Atlantic Terminal, Nostrand Avenue, and East New York stations are primarily served by a shuttle running between Atlantic Terminal and Jamaica. These stations are also served by select trains on the West Hempstead Branch on weekdays only, and a limited number of weekday peak trains from the Hempstead and Babylon branches. Other trains traveling east of Jamaica only run to Penn Station, Grand Central Madison, or Long Island City.

Zone	Routes				Location	Station	Connections and notes
Zone	NYP	GCM	AT	LIC	Location	Station	Connections and notes
1	■				Midtown Manhattan	Pennsylvania Station	Amtrak (long-distance): Cardinal, Crescent, Lake Shore Limited, Palmetto, Silver Meteor; Amtrak (intercity): Acela, Adirondack, Carolinian, Empire Service, Ethan Allen Express, Keystone Service, Maple Leaf, Northeast Regional, Pennsylvanian, Vermonter; NJ Transit Rail: ■ Gladstone Branch, ■ Montclair–Boonton Line, ■ Morristown Line, ■ Northeast Corridor Line, ■ North Jersey Coast Line, ■ Raritan Valley Line; NYC Subway: NYCT Bus, MTA Bus
1		■			Midtown Manhattan	Grand Central Madison	Metro-North Railroad: ■ Harlem Line, ■ Hudson Line, ■ New Haven Line; NYC Subway: NYCT Bus, MTA Bus
1				■	Long Island City, Queens	Long Island City	NYC Subway: MTA Bus; NYC Ferry: East River
1				■	Long Island City, Queens	Hunterspoint Avenue	New York City Subway: MTA Bus, NYCT Bus
1	■	■			Woodside, Queens	Woodside	Long Island Rail Road: ■ Port Washington Branch; NYC Subway: MTA Bus, NYCT Bus
1	■	■			Forest Hills, Queens	Forest Hills	NYC Subway: MTA Bus
1	■	■			Kew Gardens, Queens	Kew Gardens	MTA Bus, NYCT Bus
1			■		Downtown Brooklyn	Atlantic Terminal	NYC Subway: NYCT Bus, MTA Bus
1			■		Bedford–Stuyvesant, Brooklyn	Nostrand Avenue	New York City Subway: NYCT Bus
1			■		East New York, Brooklyn	East New York	New York City Subway: NYCT Bus
1			■		Richmond Hill, Queens	Boland's Landing	Employees only
3	■	■	■	■	Jamaica, Queens	Jamaica	Long Island Rail Road: ■ Babylon Branch, ■ Far Rockaway Branch, ■ Hempstead Branch, ■ Long Beach Branch, ■ Montauk Branch, ■ Oyster Bay Branch, ■ Port Jefferson Branch, ■ Ronkonkoma Branch, ■ West Hempstead Branch; NYC Subway: MTA Bus, NYCT Bus, Nassau Inter-County Express; AirTrain JFK: ■ Jamaica Train

=== Future stations ===
The MTA planned a new station in Sunnyside, Queens, once East Side Access was completed. The MTA later proposed in their 20-year needs assessment for 2025 to 2044 that Sunnyside station serve both the LIRR and the Metro-North Railroad, with the latter providing service to Penn Station after Penn Station Access is completed.

== See also ==
- List of Long Island Rail Road stations
