= Atlantic Terminal =

Long Island Rail Road station in Brooklyn, New York

- The entrance pavilion at Atlantic Terminal, which opened in 2010.

General information
- Location: Atlantic Avenue, Flatbush Avenue & Hanson Place; Brooklyn, New York City
- Coordinates: 40.684226°N 73.977234°W
- Owner: Long Island Rail Road
- Line: Atlantic Branch
- Platforms: 3 island platforms
- Tracks: 6
- Connections: New York City Subway: at Atlantic Avenue–Barclays Center; NYCT Bus: B41, B45, B63, B65, B67; MTA Bus: B103

Construction
- Structure type: Underground
- Accessible: Yes

Other information
- Station code: ATL
- Fare zone: 1

History
- Opened: July 2, 1877
- Rebuilt: 1907, 2010
- Electrified: July 26, 1905; 750 V (DC) third rail
- Former names: Brooklyn (1852–1877); Flatbush Avenue (1877–2010)

Passengers
- 2012—2014: 21,829 per weekday
- Rank: 4 of 125

Services
Preceding station	Long Island Rail Road	Following station
Terminus	City Terminal Zone Brooklyn Shuttle	Nostrand Avenue toward Jamaica
Terminus	West Hempstead Branch Weekdays only	Nostrand Avenue toward West Hempstead
Terminus	Hempstead Branch Peak periods only	Nostrand Avenue toward Hempstead
Terminus	Babylon Branch Peak periods only	Nostrand Avenue toward Babylon
Terminus	Far Rockaway Branch Peak periods only	Jamaica toward Far Rockaway
Terminus	Port Jefferson Branch Trains 1607 and 2601 only	East New York toward Huntington
Terminus	Ronkonkoma Branch Train 2011 only	Jamaica toward Ronkonkoma
Location

Atlantic Terminal (formerly Flatbush Avenue) is the westernmost commuter rail terminal on the Long Island Rail Road's (LIRR) Atlantic Branch, located at Flatbush Avenue and Atlantic Avenue in Downtown Brooklyn, New York City. It is the primary terminal for the West Hempstead Branch, and a peak-hour terminal for some trains on the Hempstead Branch, Far Rockaway Branch, Port Jefferson Branch, Ronkonkoma Branch, and the Babylon Branch; most other service is provided by frequent shuttles to Jamaica station. The terminal is located in the City Terminal Zone, the LIRR's Zone 1, and thus part of the CityTicket program. The station is announced as Atlantic Terminal Brooklyn on trains.

== History ==
=== 19th century ===
The station was originally named Brooklyn in 1852, twenty years after the line was established as the Brooklyn and Jamaica Railroad, and was not originally a terminus. The original terminus was South Ferry, via the now shuttered Cobble Hill Tunnel. When LIRR subsidiary New York and Jamaica Railroad built a new line between Hunter's Point and Jamaica in 1861, the main line was relocated there, and the line was abandoned west of East New York, in compliance with Brooklyn's ban on steam railroads. West of East New York, the tracks were taken over by horse car lines.

The Brooklyn station designation was replaced by the Flatbush Avenue station on July 2, 1877. That same summer local Atlantic Avenue rapid transit trains began to stop there on August 13. The old depot was renovated between July–August 1878, when it began serving the Brooklyn, Flatbush and Coney Island Railroad. It was rebuilt again in June 1880. The headquarters for the Long Island Express Company was installed there in 1882, and gave the station a series of tracks that would later be known as the "EX Yard." In 1888, the Union Elevated Railway built an elevated railway line and station that connected to the LIRR station called the Atlantic Avenue station. The Union Elevated eventually became part of the Brooklyn-Manhattan Transit Corporation. Further rebuilding took place again in 1893.

=== 20th century ===
Between 1904 and 1906, the Carlton Avenue Freight Yards were replaced by the Vanderbilt Avenue Freight Yards. This was just a portion of a major improvement project that included the complete reconstruction of the station. The second depot opened on April 1, 1907, with the depot at street level and the tracks installed underground. The station had a lobby that was larger than most LIRR stations, and contained subway type entrances to the tracks. It also served as a post office building until 1925, and contained a baggage depot, express buildings, some meat houses which were inherited from the previous version of the station, and a merchandise terminal for "less than carload freight" added on in 1908. The Interborough Rapid Transit Company built a subway line called the Eastern Parkway Line and a station on Atlantic Avenue, that connected to the station on May 1, 1908. The BMT also built two more subway lines on Pacific Street along the Fourth Avenue Line on June 22, 1915, and Atlantic Avenue along the Brighton Line on August 1, 1920. The connection to the BMT Fifth Avenue Line was lost on May 31, 1940.

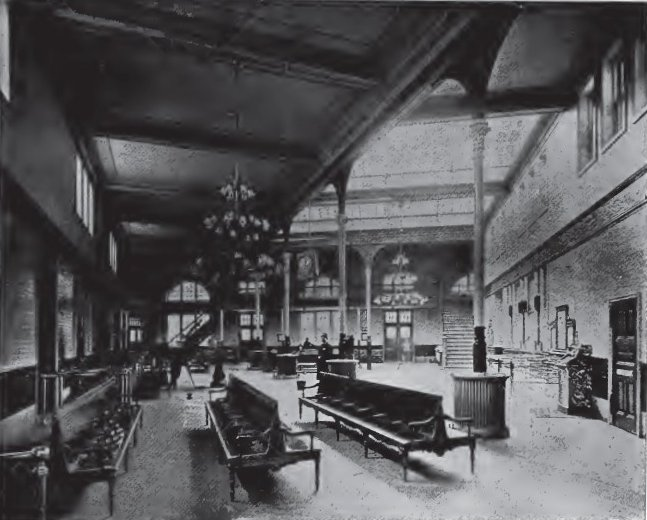
Interior of the station, c. 1893

The station was refurbished and the exterior was sandblasted in the early 1940s. The decline of rail service after World War II led to the station's gradual demise, however. Track #1 was out of service on April 10, 1959. Former express tracks numbers 9–14 ("EX" Yard) were taken out of service on March 3, 1971. At some point, the express buildings became a parking garage. Local businesses were still allowed to utilize the station, such as a barber shop, restaurants, candy stores, a snack bar, a podiatrist's office, a dental office, a beauty school, and even a row of telephone booths. Those businesses were gone by 1978. The tracks that were originally numbered from south to north were renumbered from north to south on July 1, 1978. Despite efforts to repaint the lobby in the early-1980s, random vandalism plagued the station interior causing water damage that was so severe, the street level depot was closed in 1988, and portions were razed during the 1990s.

=== 21st century ===
The MTA approved plans in March 1998 to renovate the Atlantic Avenue–Pacific Street subway station and the adjoining LIRR terminal, as well as build the Atlantic Terminal shopping mall above the station. Work on the stations' renovation began in 2000, and work on the shopping mall commenced the next year. On January 5, 2010, a new entry pavilion, designed by di Domenico + Partners, opened, providing improved connections between the LIRR, subways, and buses. In March 2010, the station was renamed Atlantic Terminal after a six-year reconstruction project, during which trains continued to operate.

In 2014, the LIRR announced that service from Babylon and Hicksville would go directly to Atlantic Terminal during New York Islanders games at Barclays Center. Passengers previously had to transfer at Jamaica to go to Babylon or Hicksville.

Since the opening of Grand Central Madison and the introduction of new schedules in February 2023, most service to Atlantic Terminal has been provided by a high-frequency shuttle service to and from Jamaica.

==== 2017 accident ====
During the morning rush hour of January 4, 2017, a train overran the bumper block at the end of track 6, injuring 103, none seriously. There were 650 passengers on the train, which had originated from Far Rockaway. The accident occurred at about 8:20 a.m. Two cars of the six-car M7 electric multiple unit train involved were severely damaged when it collided with the bumper at a speed of 10 to 15 miles per hour (16 to 24 km/h). The incident was compared to a September 2016 train crash at Hoboken Terminal in Hoboken, New Jersey, wherein a train also overran a bumper block.

The National Transportation Safety Board (NTSB) and Federal Railway Administration opened investigations into the accident. On February 6, 2018, the NTSB released their Railroad Safety Brief on the accident. They determined the probable cause to be the engineer falling asleep due to chronic fatigue. The chronic fatigue was in part attributed to undiagnosed sleep apnea.

== Station layout ==
The LIRR terminal, one floor below the ground level, has three high-level island platforms adjacent to six tracks. Platform A is ten cars long, but the two easternmost cars on Track 1 are not accessible due to a large gap between the train and the platform. Platform B is eight cars long. Platform C is six cars long, but Track 6 only has enough space for four cars to meet the platform as it is adjacent to the northbound local platform of the IRT Eastern Parkway Line.

== Subway and bus connections ==
An entrance to Atlantic Terminal displays signage for connecting subway lines

Atlantic Terminal is connected to the New York City Subway's Atlantic Avenue–Barclays Center complex, which is served by the 2, 3, 4, 5, B, D, N, Q, R and W trains. Buses serving outside the complex include B41, B45, B63, B65, B67, and B103.

== Nearby points of interest ==
The rail terminal is adjacent to and below the Atlantic Terminal mall and near the Barclays Center, Brooklyn Academy of Music and the Williamsburgh Savings Bank Tower, as well as Brooklyn Technical High School.

The massive Pacific Park residential, commercial and sports complex, which includes Barclays Center, is being built near the station and above its yard tracks.

== Gallery ==
Atlantic Terminal LIRR station

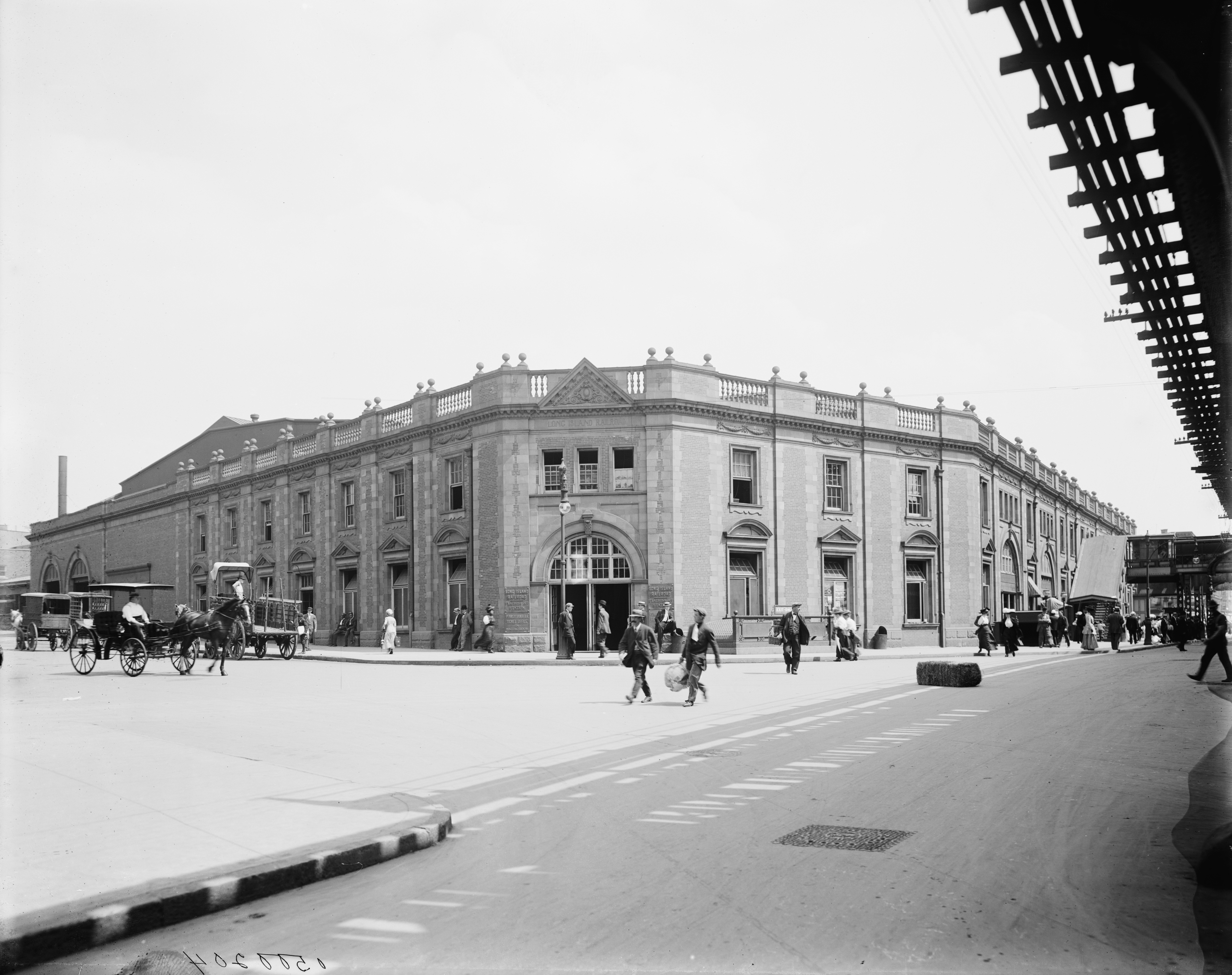
1910 photo of the former LIRR Flatbush Avenue station (demolished 1988)

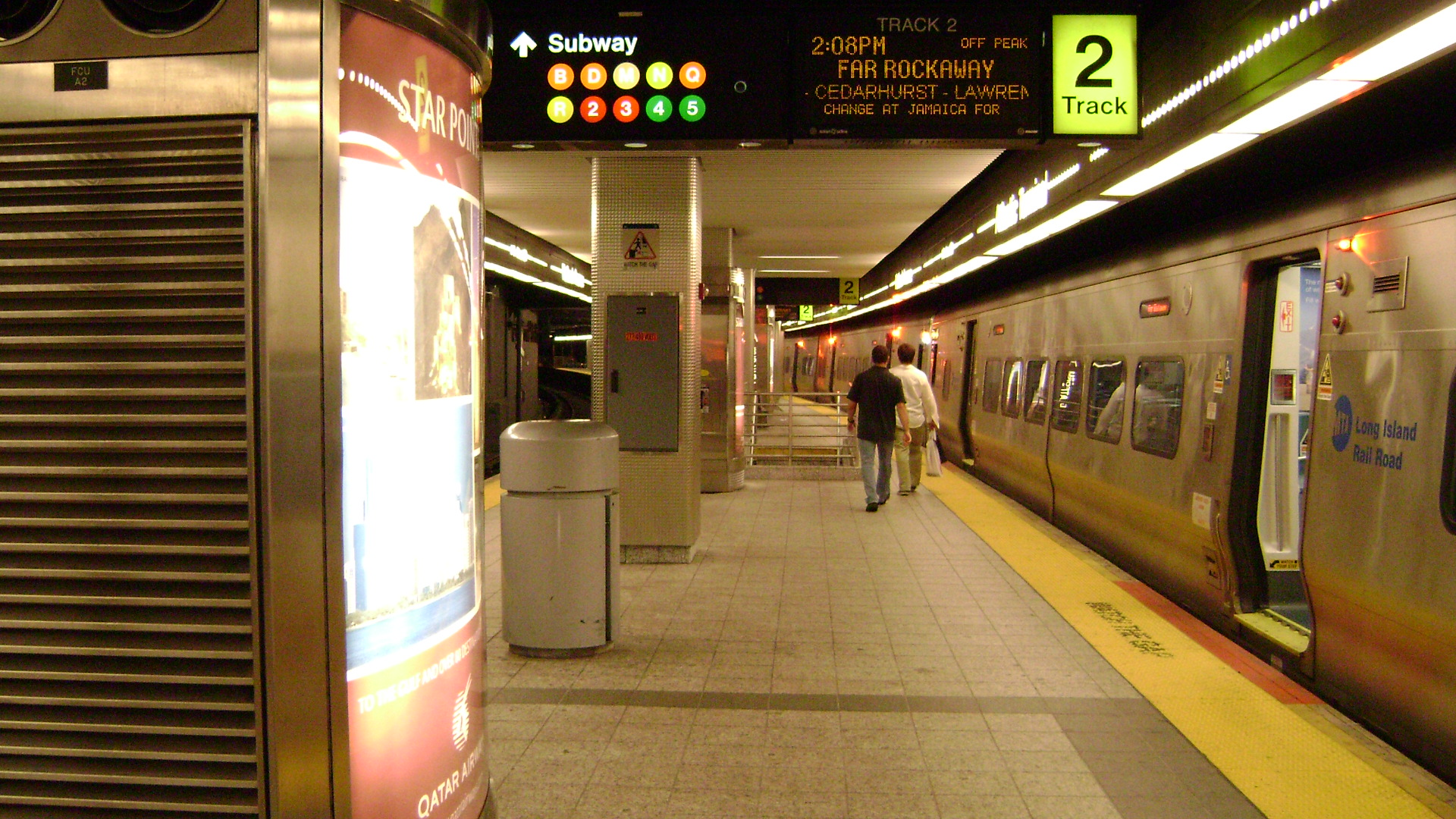
Looking down Platform A. A train to Far Rockaway is on the right

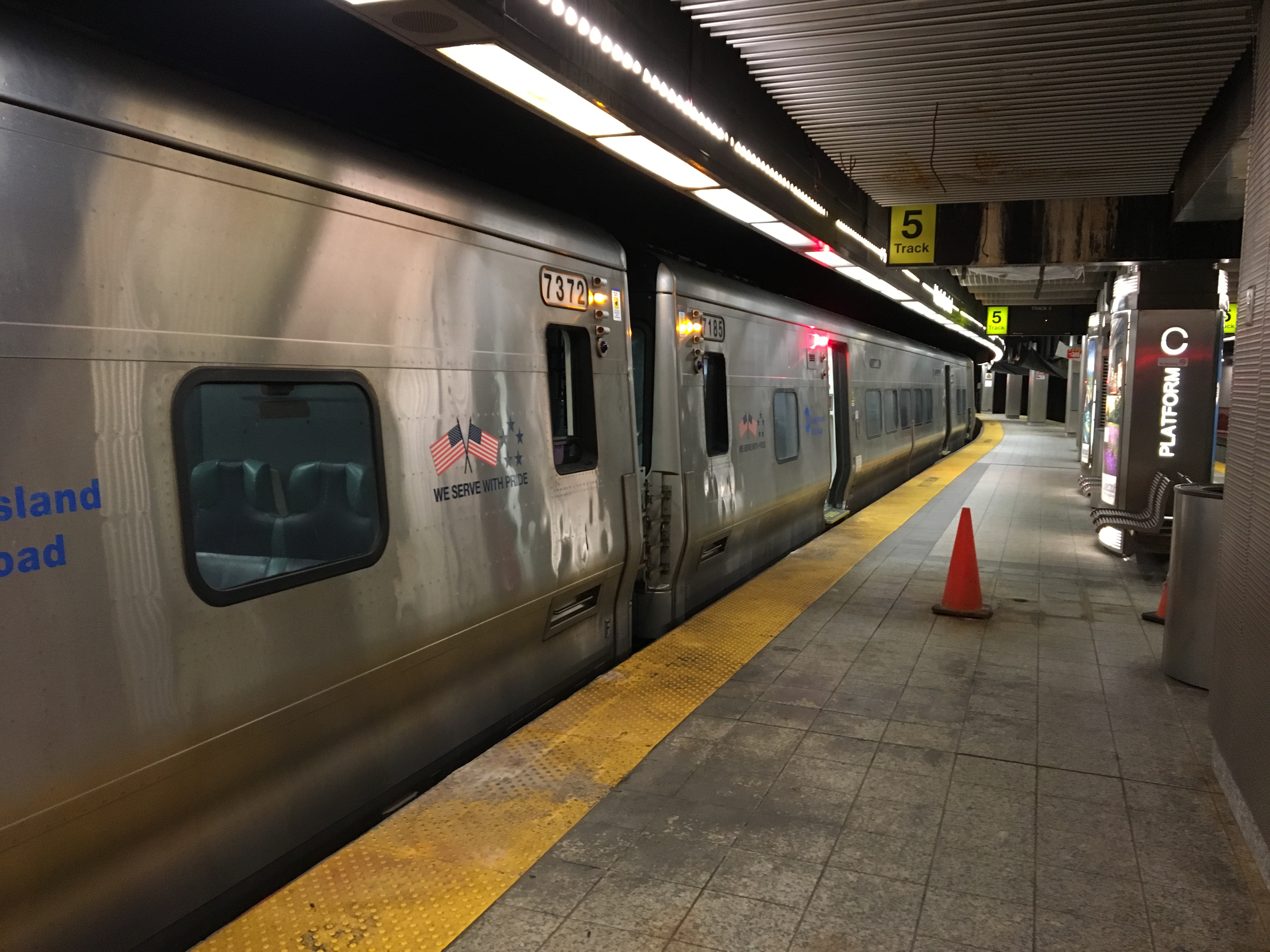
Looking down Platform C

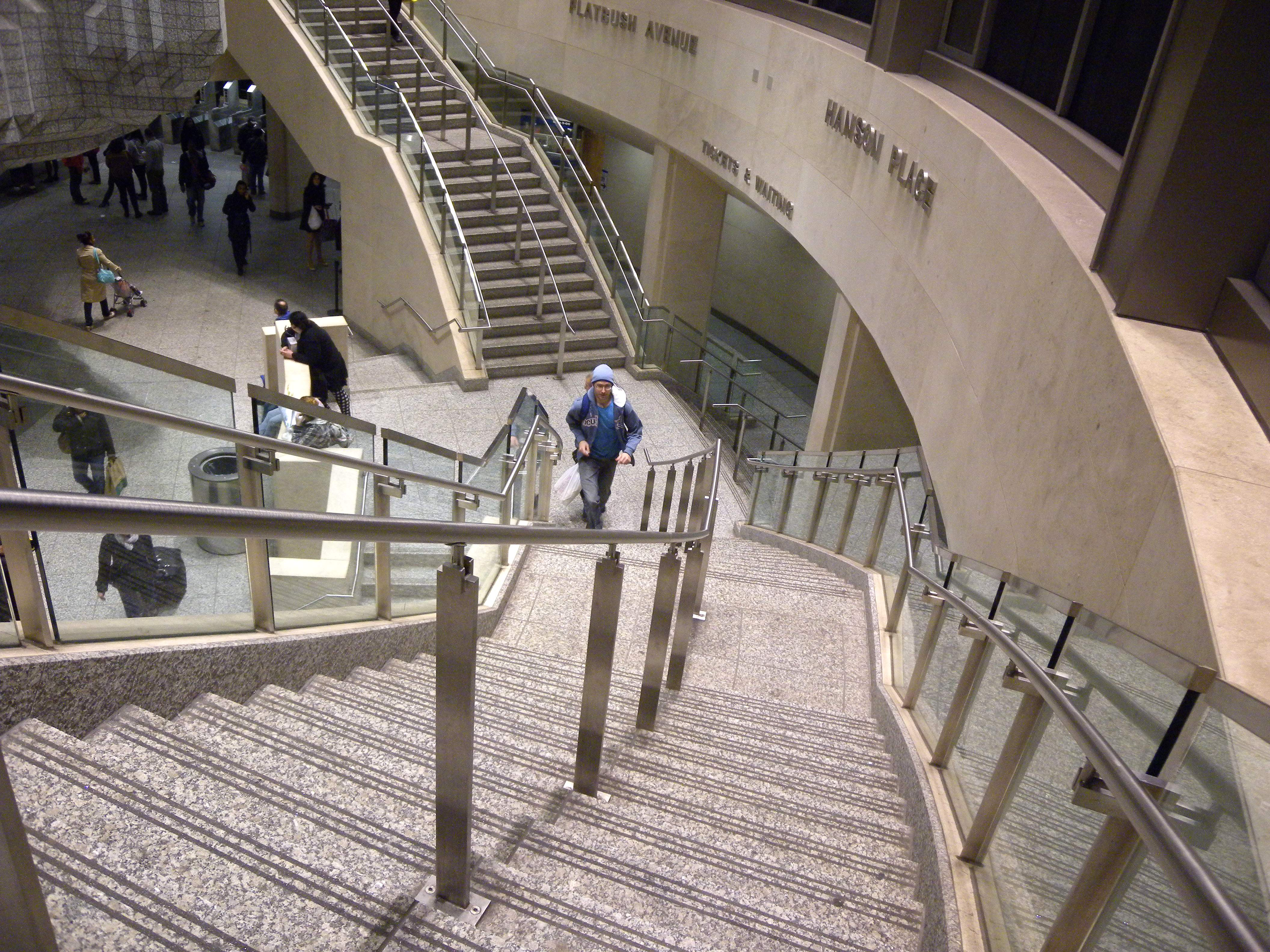
Looking down to track level in the entry pavilion

== See also ==
- Lower Manhattan–Jamaica/JFK Transportation Project
