= Babylon station =

Long Island Rail Road station in Suffolk County, New York

Babylon
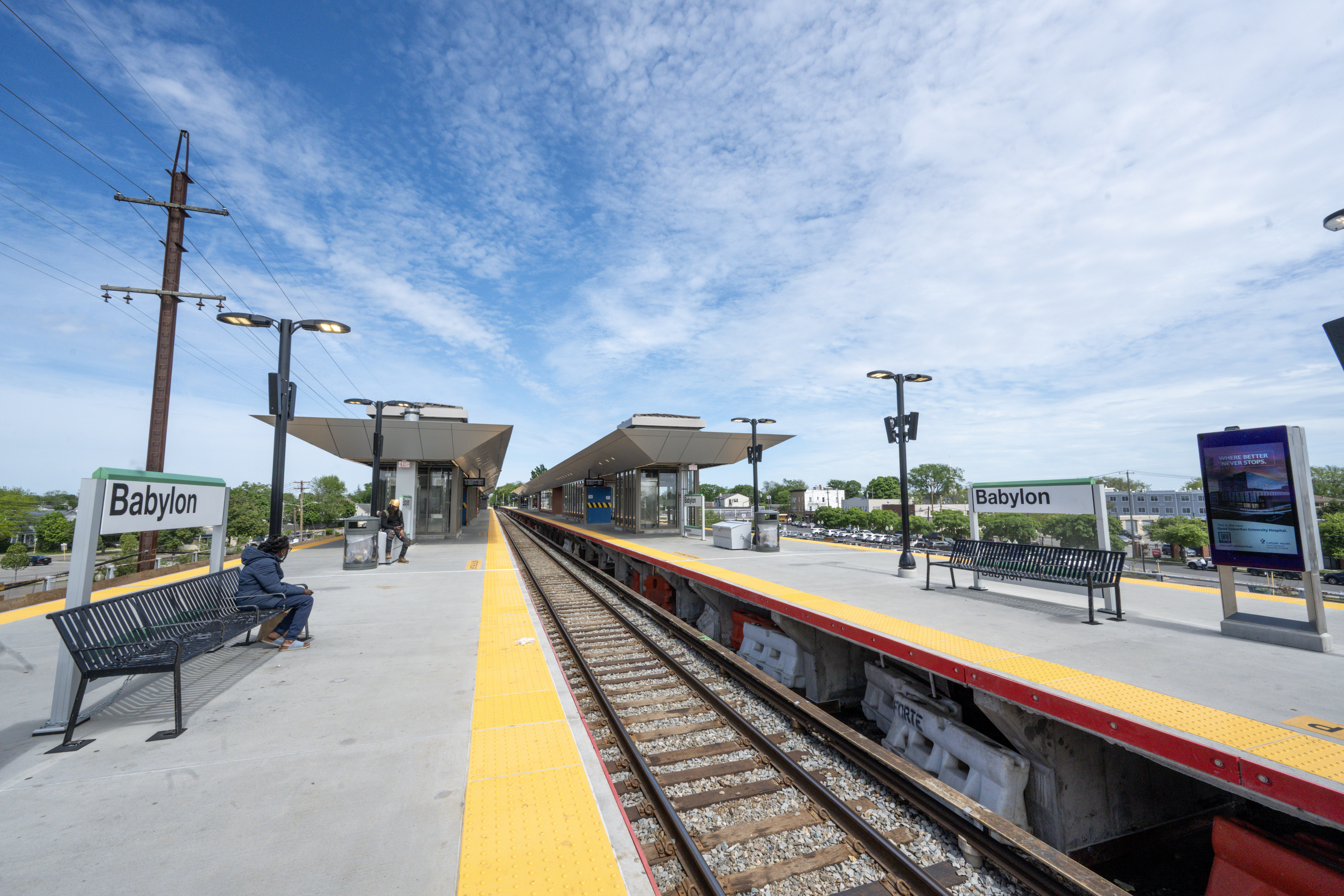
- The Babylon station's LIRR platforms in 2026

General information
- Location: Railroad Avenue & Deer Park Avenue; Babylon, New York
- Coordinates: 40.700614°N 73.32421°W
- Owner: Long Island Rail Road
- Line: Montauk Branch
- Platforms: 2 island platforms
- Tracks: 3
- Connections: Suffolk County Transit: 2, 3, 5, 10, 15 (15 summer only); Adirondack Trailways

Construction
- Parking: Yes (village permit and metered)
- Cycle facilities: Yes
- Accessible: Yes

Other information
- Station code: BTA
- Fare zone: 9

History
- Opened: October 28, 1867 (SSRRLI)
- Rebuilt: 1881, 1964, 2024–2026
- Electrified: May 21, 1925; 750 V (DC) third rail
- Former names: Seaside (July 1868–1869)

Passengers
- 2012—2014: 13,366
- Rank: 7 of 125

Services
Preceding station	Long Island Rail Road	Following station
Jamaica toward Penn Station or Long Island City	Montauk Branch	Bay Shore toward Montauk
Hicksville limited service toward Penn Station or Long Island City	Montauk Branch	Bay Shore toward Montauk
Lindenhurst toward Penn Station, Grand Central or Atlantic Terminal	Babylon Branch	Terminus
Former services
Preceding station	Long Island Rail Road	Following station
Lindenhurst toward Long Island City	Montauk Division	Bay Shore toward Montauk
South Farmingdale toward Bethpage	Central Branch	Terminus
Location

Babylon is an intermodal transportation hub within the village of Babylon, New York, located at Railroad Avenue, west of Deer Park Avenue (CR 34). It is on the Montauk Branch of the Long Island Rail Road and is the eastern terminus of service on the LIRR's Babylon Branch – and additionally serves as a major hub for Suffolk County Transit buses.

To the west of the station is Belmont Junction, where the LIRR's Central Branch splits from the Montauk Branch, to head northwest to join the Main Line at BETH Interlocking, southeast of the Bethpage station.

The Babylon station is elevated with two island platforms, and is wheelchair accessible through elevator access. The electrified portion of the Montauk Branch ends east of the station, at the Babylon Yard.

== History ==
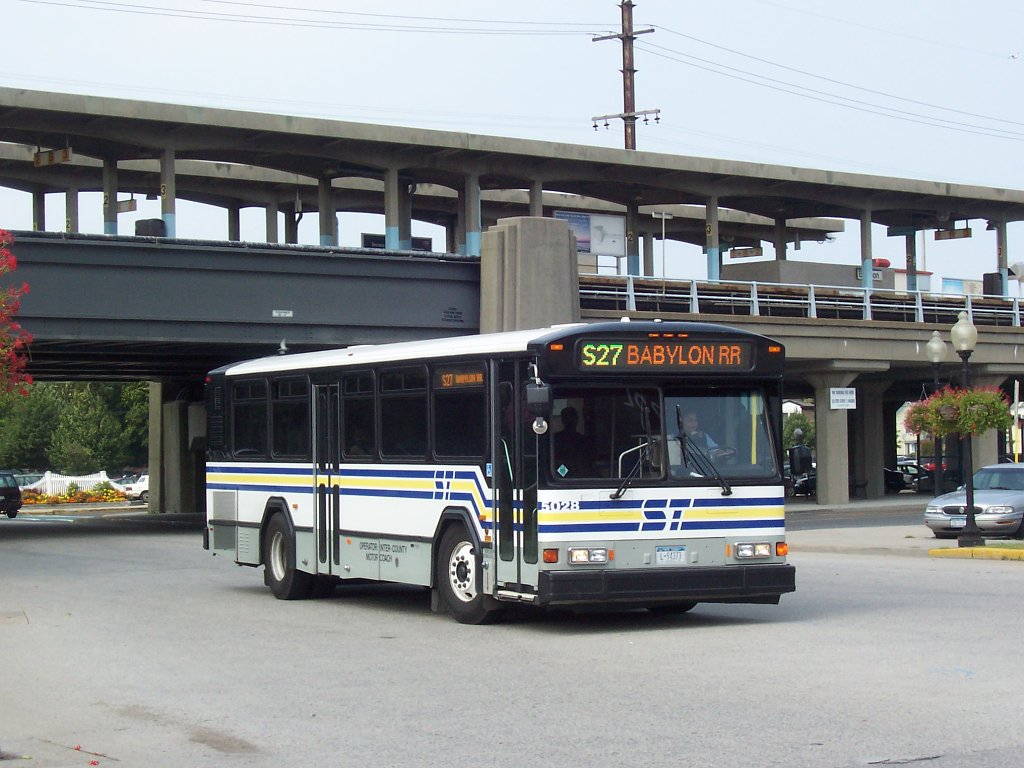
A Suffolk County Transit bus at Babylon station in 2006

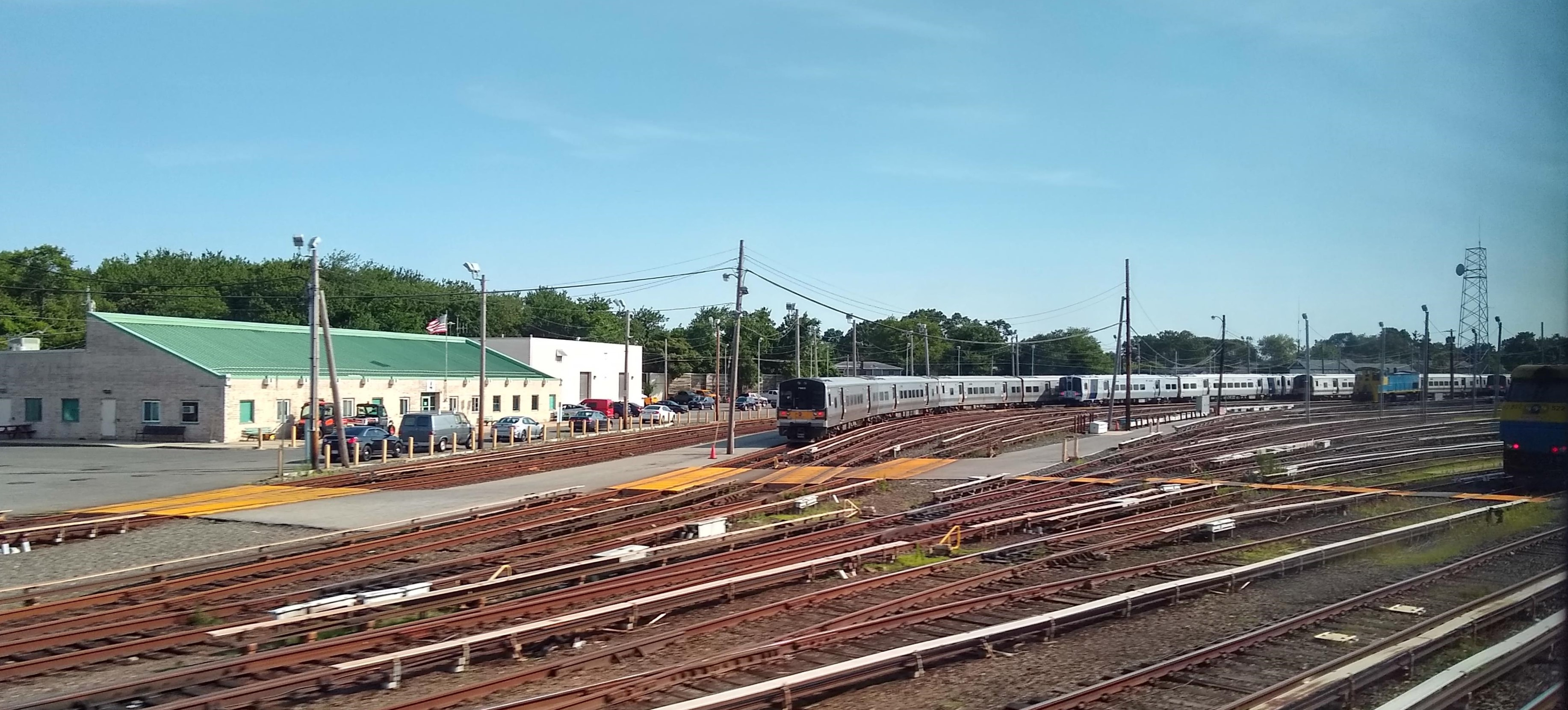
Babylon Yard, east of the station

Babylon station originally opened as a South Side Railroad of Long Island depot on October 28, 1867. It was briefly renamed Seaside station in the summer of 1868, but resumed its original name of Babylon station in 1869. The Central Railroad of Long Island had once planned an extension to the Great South Bay and Fire Island which was never built, and a horse car and later trolley line was provided by the Babylon Rail Road company as a substitute. The CRRLI abandoned their own depot in 1874, and began to share it with SSRLI. From that point on the original SSRLI depot contained the name "Babylon & Fire Island" posted on one side. The second depot opened on July 2, 1881, and contained three tracks with two low-level side platforms and two high island platforms, as well as a pedestrian bridge and a REA Express freight house.

Electrification came to the Babylon station in May 1925, at which time the station became the eastern terminus of the newly established Babylon Branch. It was razed in 1963 as part of the grade crossing elimination project that was being completed along the entire Babylon Branch during the post-war era. The new, elevated station – the third iteration of the station – opened on September 9, 1964.

East of the station, a train washing canopy existed in West Islip until 2005. In June 2010, the Long Island Rail Road broke ground on a new environmentally friendly train wash canopy to replace the one previously demolished, as at the time, the Mid-Suffolk Yard – located adjacent to the Ronkonkoma station – had the only train wash on the eastern end of Long Island. This new train wash can recycle water using filters and is capable of washing up to 180 electric multiple unit cars a day.

=== 2020s station rehabilitation ===
A station rehabilitation budgeted in the 2008–2013 Capital Plan was to include the demolition of the existing platforms and design and construction of a new platform as well as replacement of platform waiting rooms, escalators, and elevators. The project was projected to cost $39 million and would replace infrastructure that has existed since 1964. The project was ultimately delayed, with funding deferred to a future capital plan.

In 2024, as part of the 2025–2029 Capital Plan, the LIRR station began undergoing a significant reconstruction project. Starting that September, the eastern and western portions of the station's platforms closed for demolition and reconstruction, with construction expected to be completed in May 2026. As part of the project, the station would additionally receive new platform canopies, escalators, and elevators – and would see the replacement of its bathrooms, stairs, platforms, and waiting rooms.

The renovated station was opened by the MTA on June 3, 2026.

== Station layout ==
The station has two 12-car-long high-level island platforms, located on an elevated structure.

== See also ==
- Mineola station (LIRR)
- Rosa Parks Hempstead Transit Center
