= Jamaica station =

Long Island Rail Road station in Queens, New York

Jamaica
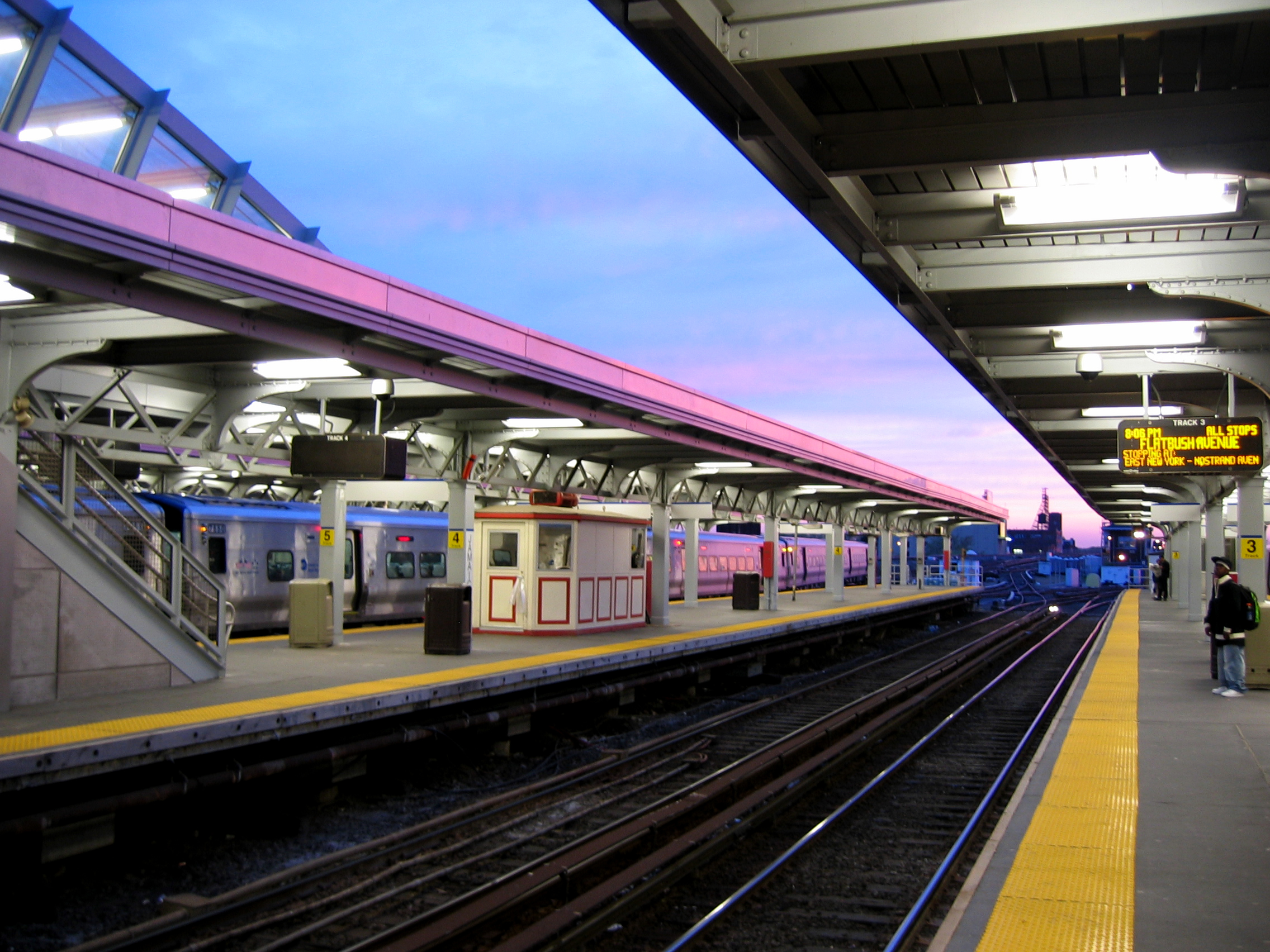
- Track 3, Platform B at Jamaica station, looking west.

General information
- Location: 93-02 Sutphin Boulevard; Jamaica, Queens, New York
- Coordinates: 40°41′59″N 73°48′28″W
- Lines: Main Line; Atlantic Branch; Montauk Branch
- Distance: 11.3 mi (18.2 km) from Penn Station; 10.5 mi (16.9 km) from Grand Central Madison; 9.3 mi (15.0 km) from Atlantic Terminal; 9.3 mi (15.0 km) Long Island City via the Main Line; 9.0 mi (14.5 km) from Long Island City via the Montauk Branch
- Platforms: 6 island platforms (cross-platform interchange)
- Tracks: 10
- Bus operators: MTA New York City Transit, MTA Bus Company, Nassau Inter County Express
- Connections: New York City Subway: at Sutphin Boulevard–Archer Avenue–JFK Airport; AirTrain JFK: Jamaica; New York City Bus: Q1, Q20, Q24, Q30, Q31, Q43, Q44 SBS, Q54, Q56, Q75; MTA Bus: Q6, Q8, Q9, Q25, Q40, Q41, Q60, Q65; Nassau Inter-County Express: n4

Construction
- Parking: Yes
- Accessible: Yes

Other information
- Station code: JAM
- Fare zone: 3

History
- Opened: 1836; 190 years ago
- Rebuilt: 1912–1913; 113 years ago, 2001–2006; 20 years ago

Passengers
- 2017: over 200,000 on weekdays
- Rank: 2 of 125
Services
Preceding station	Long Island Rail Road	Following station
East New York toward Atlantic Terminal	City Terminal Zone Atlantic shuttle	Terminus
Kew Gardens toward Penn Station or Grand Central	Hempstead Branch	Hollis toward Hempstead
East New York toward Atlantic Terminal	Hempstead Branch	Hollis toward Hempstead
Woodside toward Penn Station or Grand Central	Belmont Park Branch special events	Belmont Park Terminus
Kew Gardens toward Penn Station or Grand Central	Long Beach Branch	Locust Manor toward Long Beach
East New York AM peak service toward Atlantic Terminal	Long Beach Branch	Locust Manor toward Long Beach
Penn Station Terminus	Oyster Bay Branch	Mineola toward Oyster Bay
Hunterspoint Avenue limited service toward Long Island City	Oyster Bay Branch	Mineola toward Oyster Bay
Kew Gardens toward Penn Station or Grand Central	Ronkonkoma Branch	Mineola toward Ronkonkoma
Kew Gardens toward Penn Station or Grand Central	Ronkonkoma Branch	Elmont–UBS Arena limited service toward Ronkonkoma
Penn Station Terminus	Montauk Branch	Babylon toward Montauk
Hunterspoint Avenue limited service toward Long Island City	Montauk Branch	Mineola limited service toward Montauk
Penn Station Terminus	Cannonball summers only	Westhampton One-way operation
Kew Gardens toward Penn Station or Grand Central	Far Rockaway Branch	Locust Manor toward Far Rockaway
East New York AM/PM peak service toward Atlantic Terminal	Far Rockaway Branch	Locust Manor toward Far Rockaway
Woodside toward Penn Station or Grand Central	Babylon Branch	Lynbrook toward Babylon
East New York AM/PM peak service toward Atlantic Terminal	Babylon Branch	Lynbrook toward Babylon
Kew Gardens toward Penn Station or Grand Central	West Hempstead Branch	St. Albans toward West Hempstead
East New York toward Atlantic Terminal	West Hempstead Branch	St. Albans toward West Hempstead
Kew Gardens toward Penn Station or Grand Central	Port Jefferson Branch	Floral Park toward Huntington or Port Jefferson
Hunterspoint Avenue limited service toward Long Island City	Port Jefferson Branch	Hollis limited service toward Huntington or Port Jefferson
East New York AM/PM peak service toward Atlantic Terminal	Port Jefferson Branch	Hollis limited service toward Huntington or Port Jefferson
See AirTrain JFK section for Jamaica Train service
Former services
Preceding station	Long Island Rail Road	Following station
Dunton toward Long Island City or Penn Station	Main Line	Union Hall Street toward Greenport
Dunton toward Long Island City	Montauk Division	Union Hall Street toward Montauk
Dunton toward Flatbush Avenue	Atlantic Division	Cedar Manor toward Valley Stream
Future services
Preceding station	Amtrak	Following station
New York toward Norfolk, Newport News or Christiansburg	Northeast Regional	Hicksville toward Ronkonkoma
Location

Jamaica station is a major train station on the Long Island Rail Road (LIRR) located in Jamaica, Queens, New York City. With weekday ridership exceeding 200,000 passengers, it is the largest transit hub on Long Island, the fourth-busiest rail station in North America, and the second-busiest station that exclusively serves commuter traffic. It is the third-busiest rail hub in the New York area, behind Penn Station and Grand Central Terminal. Over 1,000 trains pass through each day, the fourth-most in the New York area behind Penn Station, Grand Central Terminal, and Secaucus Junction.

Jamaica station is located on an embankment above street level and contains six platforms and ten tracks for LIRR trains. A concourse above the LIRR platforms connects to a station on the AirTrain JFK elevated people mover to John F. Kennedy International Airport, which contains two tracks and one platform. There are also connections to the Archer Avenue lines of the New York City Subway at a separate station directly below. The area just outside is served by several local bus routes, and others terminate within a few blocks of the station.

The station is located at the junction between the LIRR's three main trunk routes, its Main Line, Atlantic Branch, and Montauk Branch. Due to this, all LIRR passenger service barring the Port Washington Branch operates through here, with it being common for commuters to "Change at Jamaica" between trains to travel between points on Long Island and the four New York City terminals.

Starting in or about 2028, the Jamaica station will also serve intercity rail with Amtrak's Northeast Regional to Ronkonkoma station.

== History ==
=== Original stations ===
Two former stations existed in Jamaica prior to the current one, serving two different railroads. The first was the LIRR's original Jamaica Station ("Old Jamaica"), built c. 1836 as the terminus of the LIRR. It was remodeled in 1869 and again in 1872, only to be completely rebuilt between 1882 and 1883 adjacent to and in use concurrently with the original depot. Covered platforms were later installed. "Old Jamaica" station at what is now 153rd Street (0.4 mile east of the present station) was razed in 1912 with the grade elimination project, the "Jamaica Improvements".

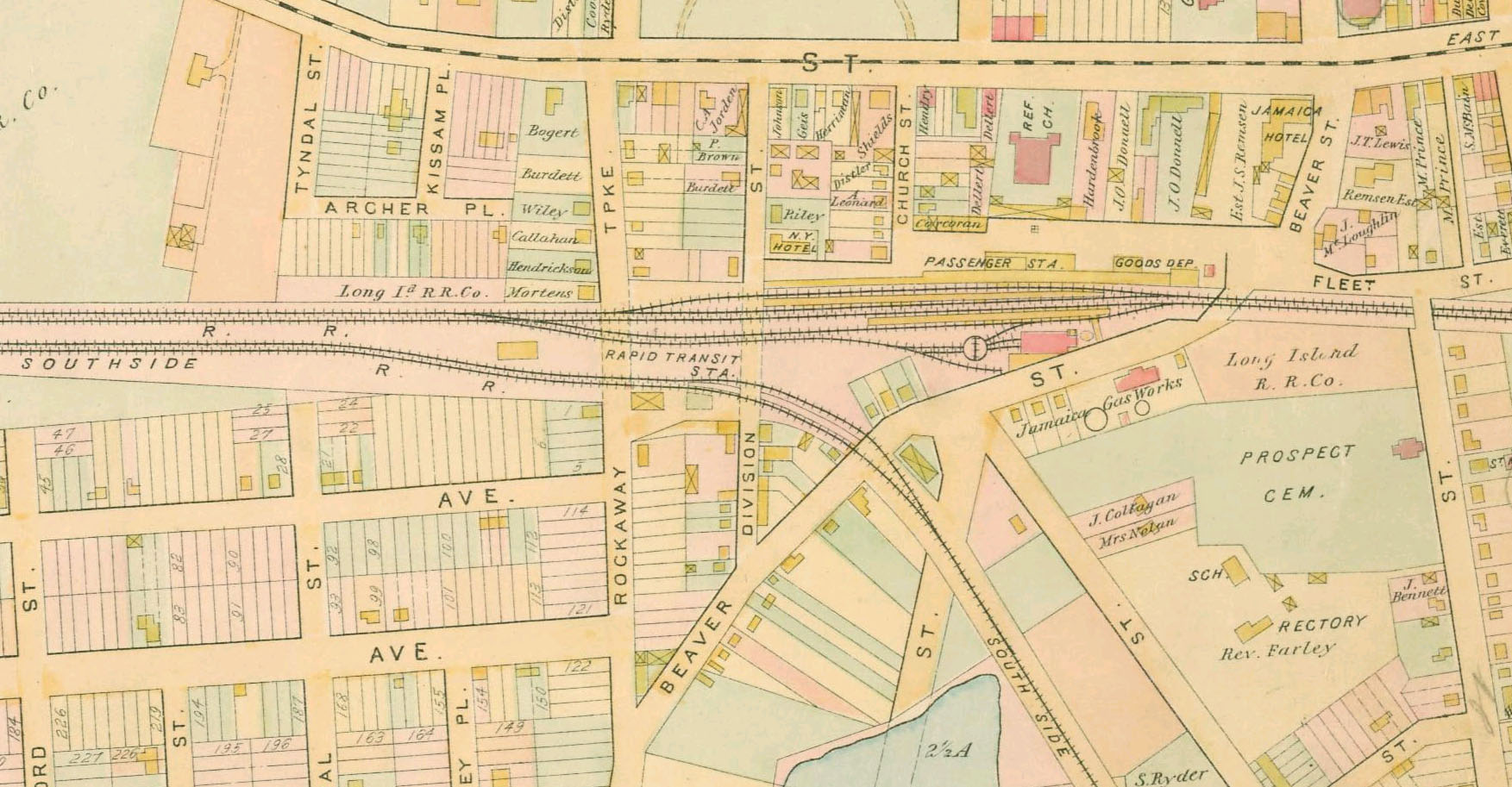
A map of the station in 1891

The other station known as Jamaica–Beaver Street was built by the South Side Railroad of Long Island on the Atlantic Branch. It opened on October 28, 1867. It was razed in 1871 and replaced on Christmas Day of the same year. When the LIRR acquired the SSRRLI in 1867, the depot was moved to the south side of Beaver Street crossing on a stub track. Low platforms for this station stop were located on the north side of Beaver Street crossing. Timetables of the period show station stop as "Jamaica" for Atlantic Branch trains bound for Locust Avenue, Springfield, and Valley Stream, as "Old Southern Road" station. Between 1908 and 1913, the station stop was listed as "Jamaica (Beaver Street)." Jamaica–Beaver Street station was razed with the grade elimination in 1913. No trace of the Jamaica–Beaver Street station exists today.

=== Construction of current station ===
The present Jamaica station was designed by Kenneth M. Murchison and built between 1912 and 1913 as a replacement for the two former stations in Jamaica. Both former stations were discontinued as station stops. The 1912–13 "Jamaica Improvement" was the final step in consolidating the branch lines of the LIRR. To the west of the station, Jay Interlocking was built, and to the east, Hall Interlocking was constructed. These interlockings allowed any line to reach any other line, allowing easy transfers between lines at Jamaica station.

When the new Jamaica station opened, residents of Jamaica were dissatisfied with its location; downtown Jamaica was centered around Union Hall Street, 0.6 miles (0.97 km) east of the new station at Sutphin Boulevard and Archer Avenue. The LIRR thus decided to add a new Union Hall Street station in 1913. (The Union Hall Street station closed on May 20, 1977.)

After the merging of Beaver Street station with the new Jamaica Station, the LIRR built a replacement along the Atlantic/Far Rockaway Branch southeast of the former SSRRLI depot. It was named "South Street station" and was located on what is today South Road between 157th and 159th Streets. Originally the site of the "SJ Tower," which was used to keep trolleys and trains from colliding with one another until the grade crossing was eliminated in 1913, it was built on November 15, 1917. Due to the close proximity to Jamaica Station, the New York Public Service Commission granted them permission to close the station on March 28, 1922. It was finally closed in June of that year.

On August 15, 1955, LIRR officials announced that it would install a complicated arrangement of signals and switches to the east of the station within two weeks for nearly $100,000 to allow eastbound express trains in the evening rush hour to bypass the station via the station's westbound tracks. The LIRR was in the process of planning improvements to the station's west to allow westbound express trains in the morning rush hour to run via the station's eastbound tracks.

=== 1994 renovation ===
In September 1983, the LIRR announced that De Leuw, Cather & Company would complete a conceptual design for the construction of express bypass tracks through the station. As part of the $2.1 million contract, De Leuw would complete a conceptional design by September 1984, with final design and engineering to be completed by September 1985. The project, which would also study the consolidation of towers into a master tower, was intended to increase capacity and reduce train congestion.

In 1986, the LIRR announced a $209 million renovation to the station complex to alleviate the bottleneck. As part of the plan, which would be funded in the proposed $8.3 billion 1987–1991 Capital Program, the station approaches would be modified to allow trains to use a greater number of tracks at increased speeds, platforms would be extended, an additional platform would be added. In addition, a new master tower would be constructed, replacing three older towers, and an express track would be installed through the middle of the station to allow trains bypassing the station to pass through at 45 miles per hour, instead of passing through at 15 miles per hour. In addition, a passenger overpass would be constructed. The project was expected to reduce travel times by two to seven minutes, increase capacity, allowing for increased rush hour service, and increase operating flexibility. The implementation of the plan was scheduled in eleven separate phases. The plan would have rebuilt six miles of tracks on the Main Line between the Van Wyck Expressway and Bellerose, and construct a new southern platform.

On July 13, 1987, LIRR officials announced that the station renovation would take two years longer than the initial plan, with completion now scheduled for 1993, and that the project's budget was increased from $213 million to $320 million. A third of the increased cost came from the addition of two years to the project, with some of the rest of the cost coming from underestimated labor and material costs. LIRR President Bruce McIver said that the initial timetable would have had too great of an impact on service performance. The project had been scheduled to start in 1988, but MTA President Robert Kiley said that he did not anticipate that the modified plans would be completed in time to start work then. On September 14, 1987, it was announced that the cost of the project was increased further to $342.5 million. The plan for the project was split in two sections, with one in the 1987–1991 Capital Program, and the other in the 1992–1996 Capital Program. The first phase, which was slated to begin in 1988 and be completed by 1994 and would cost $192.5 million, would construct a new master control tower and a rider overpass, and install new signals and switches. The second phase, which would cost $150 million, would move platforms to provide space for the construction of westbound and eastbound express tracks through the station and build some elevated trackage. Work would begin after 1991 and be completed by 1999.

In 1988, plans were announced for a $209 million station renovation that was expected to be completed in 1994. The project would add elevators, new staircases, overhauled platforms, new tracks, a second pedestrian overpass, and a second pedestrian bridge to be located at the eastern end of the station, connecting all the platforms. A lower-level concourse would be added to provide additional route for riders. Two connections were added to the new Archer Avenue Line.

In April 1988, construction began on an $11.3 million overpass, which would be between the east end concourse and the west end of the platforms. The project would add elevators to the five platforms to make the station accessible, and an elevator between street level near the waiting room to the overpass.

On September 11, 1989, the LIRR announced that it had dropped most of its planned reconstruction of Jamaica due to changes in commuting patterns and technology. $84 million would still be allocated for the construction of a pedestrian overpass and elevators, and for design and engineering work. Work on the elevators and overpass began in April 1988, and was expected to be completed in January 1990. The money saved from deferring most of the project would be used to offset overruns in the cost of improvements at Penn Station, and for other projects.

=== 2001–2006 expansion ===
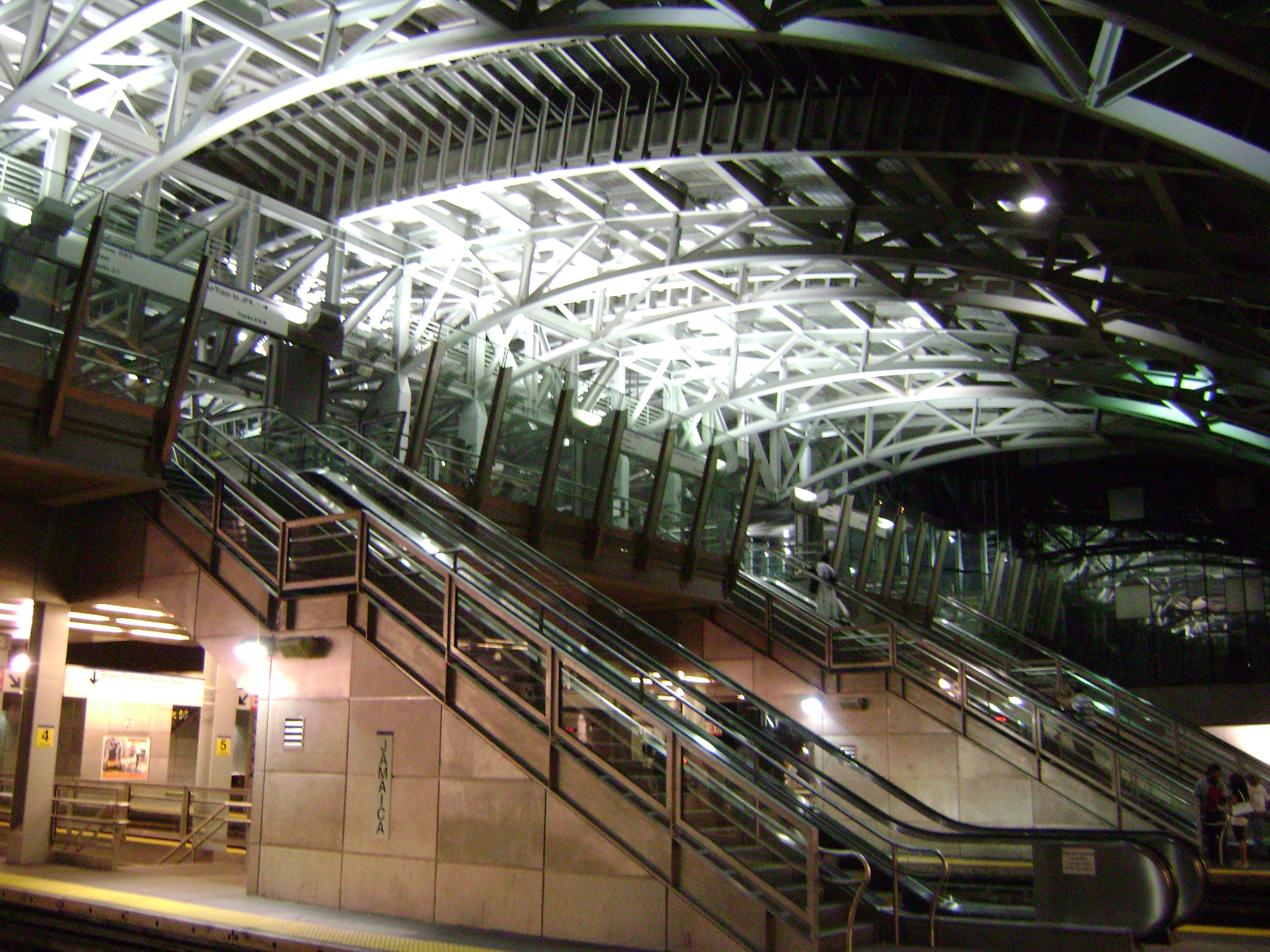
The station's steel and glass canopy

A $387 million renovation project began in 2001 and was completed in 2006. It was carried out in conjunction with the construction of AirTrain JFK's terminal (the Port Authority of New York and New Jersey contributed $100 million toward the project).

The project had two goals. Passenger-oriented renovations included new platforms and a pedestrian bridge, a central elevator bank linking the LIRR to the street and to the Sutphin Boulevard subway station, a new mezzanine connecting to AirTrain and a new steel and glass canopy over the elevated tracks. The focal point of the project was the Jamaica Control Center, built by Tishman Construction Corporation and Bechtel. The JCC houses the LIRR offices, railroad control center and MTA Police. Overall, the renovations enlarged the station and have made it more modern and efficient, providing easier access to all eight LIRR tracks. The entire station complex, including AirTrain and the subway, is compliant with the Americans with Disabilities Act of 1990 (ADA). The project was named "2006 Project of the Year" by the Long Island branch of the American Society of Civil Engineers.

=== Jamaica Capacity Improvements program (2015–present) ===
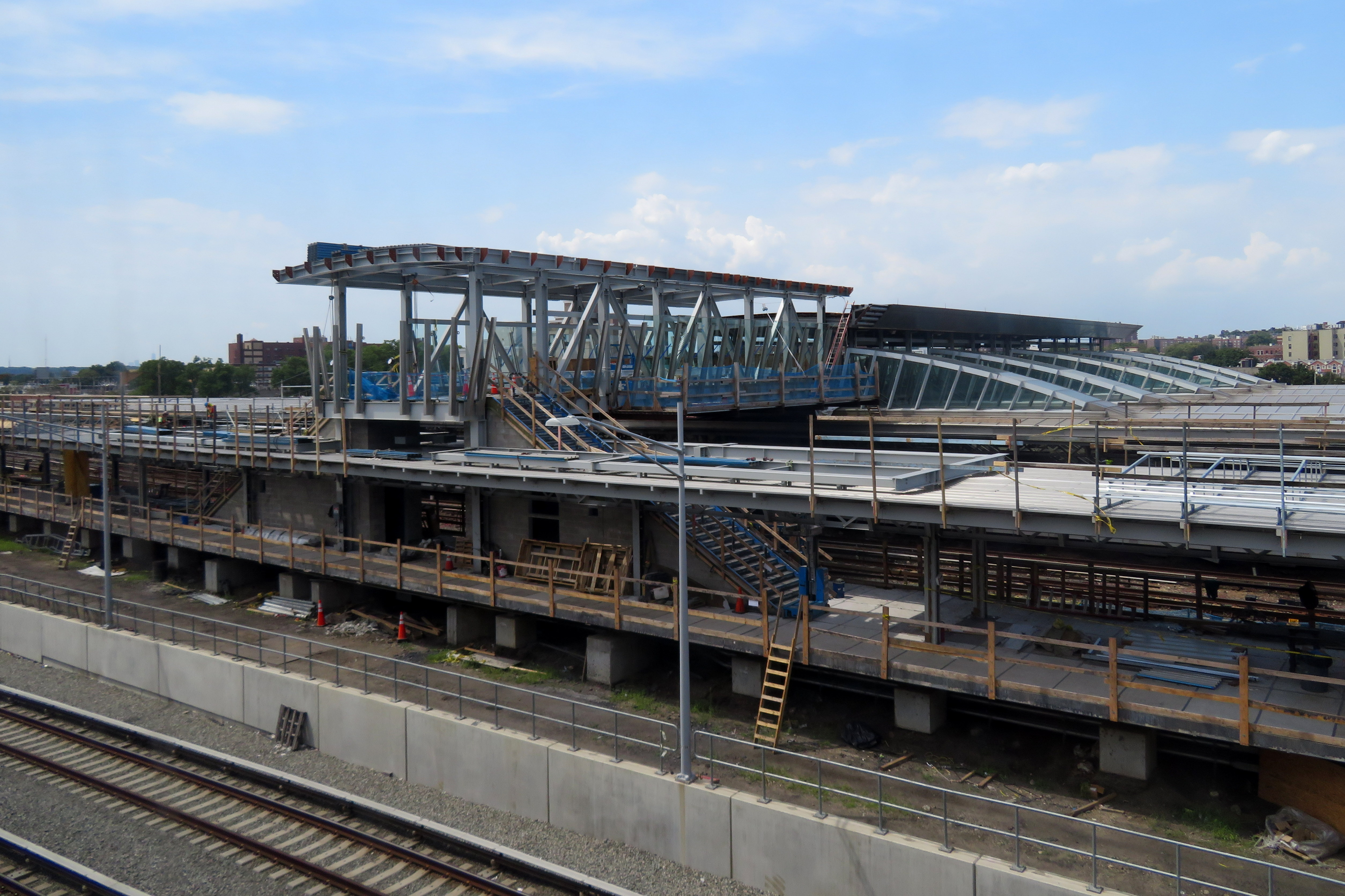
Platform F construction in August 2019

As part of a series of LIRR readiness projects in preparation for the East Side Access extension to Grand Central Terminal, the MTA had adjusted track layouts at Jamaica station to straighten train paths and install high-speed switches. As part of the project, additional ladder tracks have been created. In addition, in February 2023, most Brooklyn service was converted into a shuttle service. This shuttle operates between Atlantic Terminal in Brooklyn and Jamaica via the Atlantic Branch. A new Platform F and dedicated tracks were constructed south of the existing LIRR platforms at Jamaica station to serve the shuttles; most passengers traveling between Brooklyn and Long Island are required to make a walking transfer between this new platform and the existing platforms.

This reconfiguration was designed to allow for increased service between Brooklyn and Jamaica and between Jamaica and Manhattan (up to a 40% increase in the latter case) and reduce switching maneuvers, while raising average train speeds around Jamaica station from 15 to 30 miles per hour (24 to 48 km/h). Service frequency was also increased for trains on the Atlantic Branch; trains run about every 8–9 minutes during rush hours and every 20 minutes during off-peak hours. However, the project has been criticized (both during construction and following the implementation of service changes) because it eliminated most direct service from Long Island to Brooklyn, thereby increasing commute time between the two destinations.

Completion of Phase I, which includes the new platform, was originally projected for January 2018. The completion date was later pushed back to July 2019, but as of March 2019, is planned to be finished in 2021 at a cost of $380 million. The platform itself was to be completed at the end of 2019, while the track and surrounding infrastructure would be completed in late 2020, and track interlockings would be completed by late 2021. The platform ultimately opened in February 2020 after several delays. Additional improvements, to cost over $1 billion, were to be constructed starting as early as 2022; designs for these improvements started in June 2017 and were scheduled to be completed in 2021.

Phase II of the project involves converting the E Yard east of the station into a through route, and additional track layout changes in Hall Interlocking. This will eliminate routing conflicts present in the current layout. The two tracks that were E Yard will be extended via a new bridge over 150th Street. Construction of the bridge is in progress as of April 2025. In January 2026, Governor Kathy Hochul announced that she would allocate $50 million for the design phase of a further renovation of the Jamaica station. The planned renovation coincided with increased development in the surrounding neighborhood.

=== Future ===
In January 2025, it was officially announced that a new Long Island branch of Amtrak's Northeast Regional would be created, running east from Penn Station and points south & west to Ronkonkoma via the LIRR's Main Line, with intermediate stops at Jamaica and Hicksville. The year prior, Amtrak conducted a study of the new service through a $500 million federal grant. As of January 2025, Amtrak service is anticipated to begin in 2028.

== Station layout ==
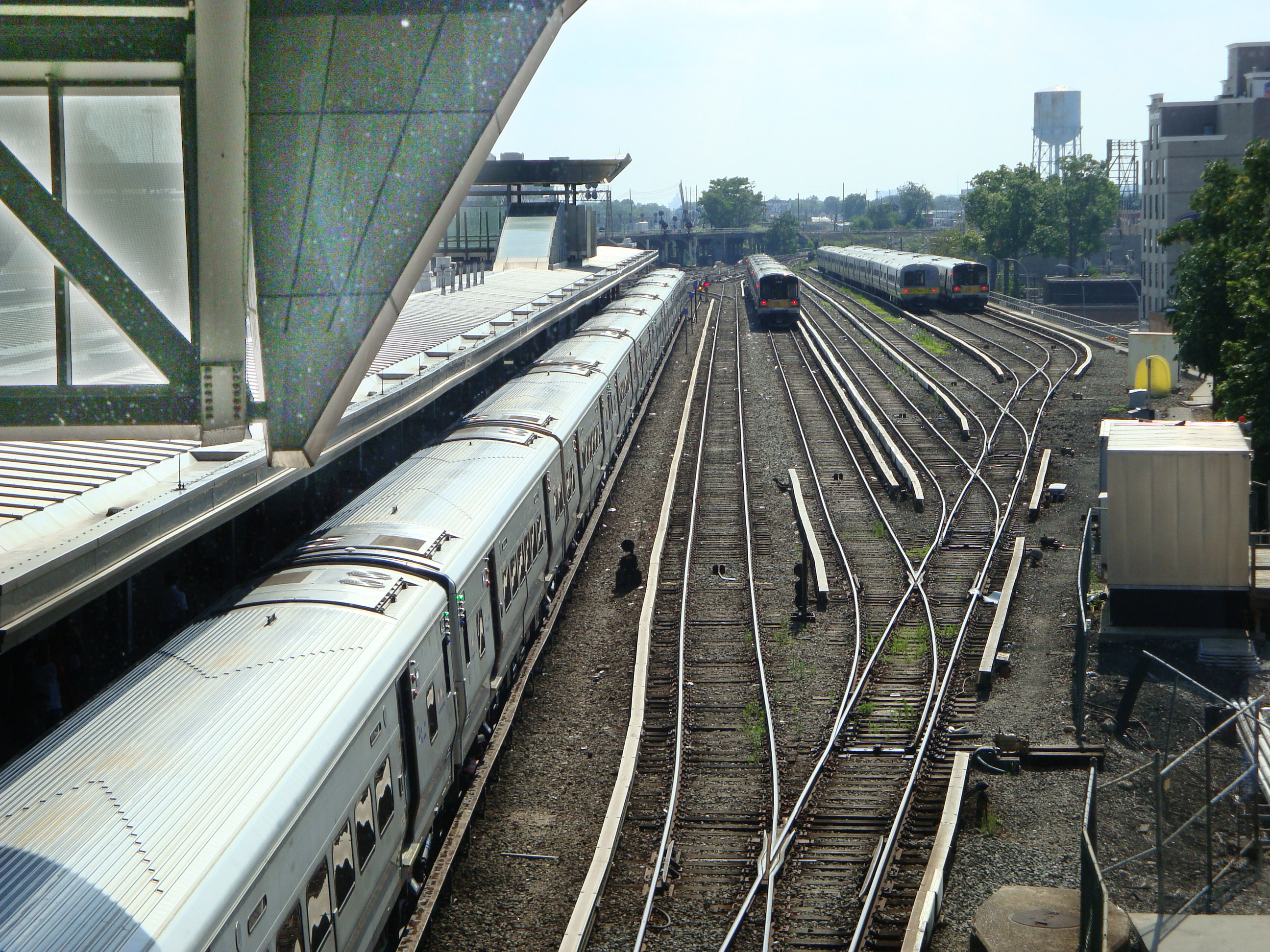
Layup tracks north of Jamaica station

Jamaica is the Long Island Rail Road's hub station. There are six high-level island platforms. Five of them, Platforms A–E, serve tracks 1–8 and are each 1,000 feet (300 m) long, fitting almost 12 cars. Tracks 1, 2, and 3 are primarily used by westbound trains; tracks 6, 7, and 8 are primarily used by eastbound trains; and tracks 4 and 5 generally provide additional capacity in the peak direction. Trains on tracks 2 and 7 utilize a Spanish solution boarding layout, as these trains can be entered from platforms on either side. The sixth platform, Platform F, serves tracks 11–12 and is shorter than the other platforms. It is located to the south of platforms A–E and is used by shuttles to and from Atlantic Terminal. Tracks 9–10 are not adjacent to any platforms and can be used by non-revenue passenger trains or by freight trains. There are two overpasses connecting the platforms.

Until the completion of East Side Access in 2023, multiple trains bound for different terminals were scheduled to arrive at Jamaica simultaneously (westbound on tracks 1, 2, and 3; eastbound on tracks 6, 7, and 8) and accommodate quick cross-platform transfers. Connections are no longer built into the schedule as of February 27, 2023, resulting in varying transfer times, and most Brooklyn trains require an up-and-over connection via one of the station's overpasses (having been guaranteed and cross-platform prior to the schedule change).

The main entrance to the station, where tickets may be purchased and where waiting areas are located, is a 100-year-old building that also serves as the offices and headquarters of the Long Island Rail Road Company.

== AirTrain station ==
Jamaica Station
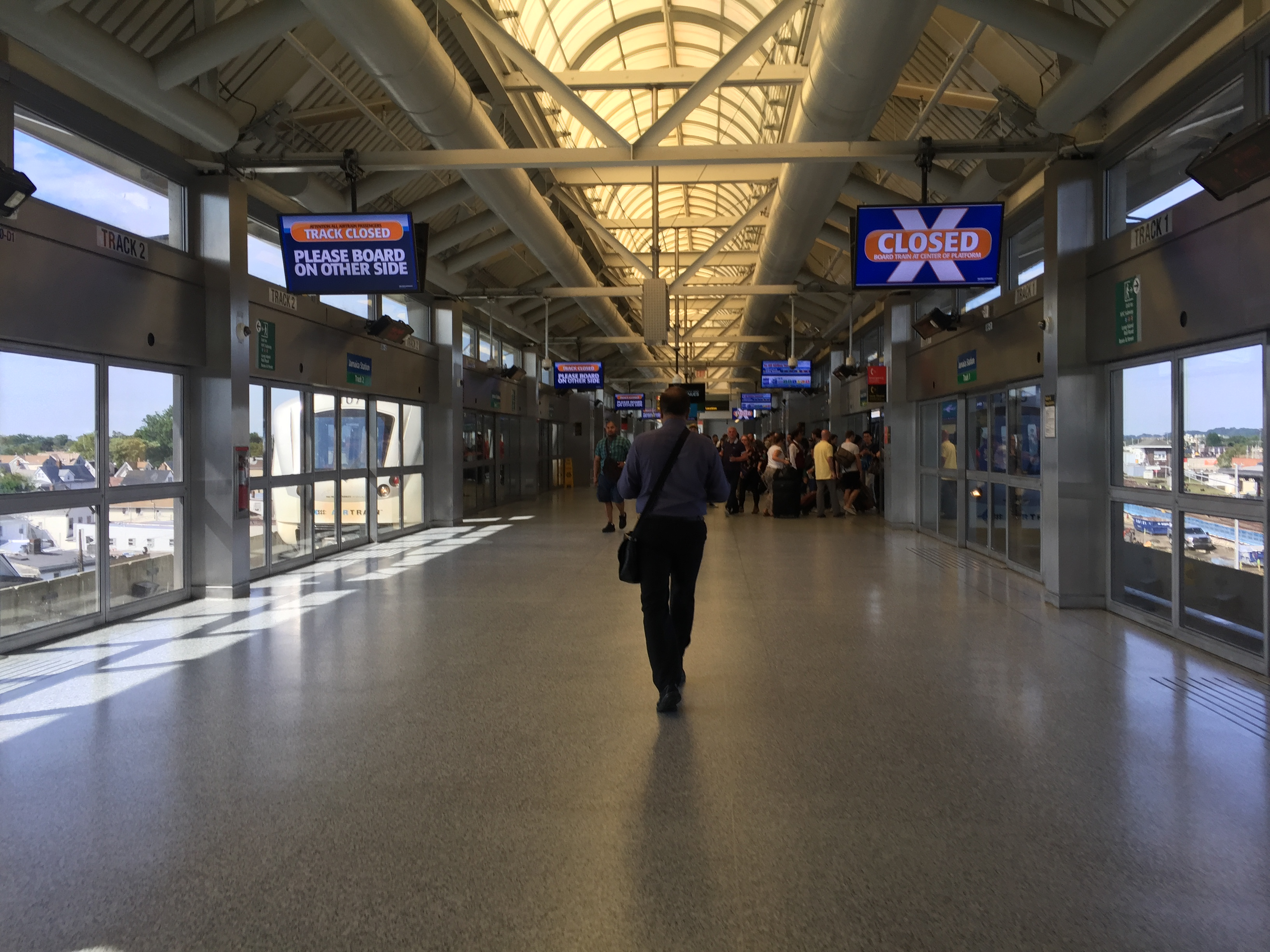
- The platform at the Jamaica AirTrain JFK station

General information
- Location: Sutphin Boulevard; Jamaica, Queens, New York
- Coordinates: 40.69904°N 73.80807°W
- System: AirTrain JFK
- Owner: Port Authority of New York and New Jersey
- Line: Jamaica Train
- Platforms: 1 island platform
- Tracks: 2

Construction
- Structure type: Elevated
- Accessible: Yes
- Architect: Voorsanger Architects

History
- Opened: December 17, 2003

Services
Preceding station	Port Authority of New York and New Jersey	Following station
Terminus	Jamaica Train	Federal Circle toward Airport terminals
Location

The Jamaica AirTrain JFK station, located in an enclosed glass structure to the south of the LIRR platforms, has 2 tracks and 1 island platform. It is accessed by escalator or elevator from street level as well as via an enclosed bridge connecting it to the LIRR station. Unlike the LIRR platforms, the AirTrain JFK platforms are entirely enclosed and feature platform screen doors, which help the station maintain a constant temperature and prevent passengers from falling onto the tracks. An array of sensors detect a train's position on the track, and only when it is properly aligned will the train's doors open. This enables the AirTrain to use automatic train operation.

The platform measures approximately 240 feet (73 m). The next stop to the south is Federal Circle, followed by the six JFK airline terminal stops. West of the station the track curves to the left and runs south, above the Van Wyck Expressway. Since it is owned by the Port Authority of New York and New Jersey, it uses a separate fare control from the LIRR. Passengers must pay their fare when either entering or leaving the station, as this station and Howard Beach are the only stations where fares are collected. MetroCard vending machines were located on both sides of fare control, but were removed in 2026 due to the retirement of the MetroCard. These were replaced with OMNY machines.

=== History ===
The Jamaica AirTrain JFK station opened on December 17, 2003, along with the rest of the AirTrain JFK system. The station was designed by Voorsanger Architects, and was done in a manner which would make passengers feel as if they had already arrived at the airport, as one of two "gateway stations" (the other being Howard Beach).

During the system's planning process, the station was originally designated Station D.

=== Station layout ===
2F	Track 1	← Jamaica Train toward Terminal 8 (Federal Circle)
2F	Island platform with PSDs, doors will open on the left, right
2F	Track 2	← Jamaica Train toward Terminal 8 (Federal Circle)
1F	Lobby	Fare control, connection to LIRR platforms
G	Street level	Exit/entrance, connection to buses, taxis, and subway station

== Bus and rail connections ==
=== Subway connections ===
New York City Subway:

- Sutphin Boulevard–Archer Avenue–JFK Airport station on the Archer Avenue Line (E, J, and Z trains)

=== Bus connections ===
Bus connections at Jamaica Station:
Route	Western/southern terminal	Eastern/northern terminal	Via
MTA Bus
Q6	North Cargo Road, John F. Kennedy International Airport	168th Street Bus Terminal	Sutphin Boulevard
Q8	Gateway Center Mall, Spring Creek, Brooklyn	168th Street Bus Terminal	101st Avenue
Q9	South Ozone Park	168th Street Bus Terminal	Sutphin Boulevard, Van Wyck Expressway, and Lincoln Street
Q25	Sutphin Boulevard/Archer Avenue	College Point	Kissena Boulevard, Parsons Boulevard
Q40	South Jamaica	Sutphin Boulevard/Hillside Avenue	Sutphin Boulevard, Lakewood Avenue, and 142nd Street
Q41	Lindenwood	165th Street Bus Terminal	127th Street, Cross Bay Boulevard
Q60	Midtown Manhattan	South Jamaica	Queens Boulevard
Q65	Sutphin Boulevard/Archer Avenue	Flushing – Main Street & Roosevelt Avenue / Main Street station	164th Street
NYCT Bus
Q1	Archer Avenue/146th Street	Bellerose	Hillside Avenue, Braddock Avenue
Q20	Archer Avenue/Merrick Boulevard	College Point	Main Street, 20th Avenue
Q24	East New York, Brooklyn	Parsons Blvd/88th Avenue	Atlantic Avenue
Q30	Archer Avenue/146th Street	Little Neck	Utopia Parkway
Q31	Archer Avenue/146th Street	Bay Terrace	Utopia Parkway
Q43	Archer Avenue/146th Street	Floral Park	Hillside Avenue
Q44 SBS	Archer Avenue/Merrick Boulevard	Bronx Zoo	Main Street, Cross Bronx Expressway
Q54	Williamsburg, Brooklyn	Jamaica Avenue/171st Street	Metropolitan Avenue
Q56	East New York, Brooklyn	Jamaica Avenue/171st Street	Jamaica Avenue
Q75	Archer Avenue/146th Street	Queensborough Community College	Utopia Parkway

== See also ==
- Long Island Rail Road
- East Side Access
- Lower Manhattan-Jamaica/JFK Transportation Project
- List of busiest railway stations in North America
