= Accessibility of the Metropolitan Transportation Authority =

Aspect of transit system in New York

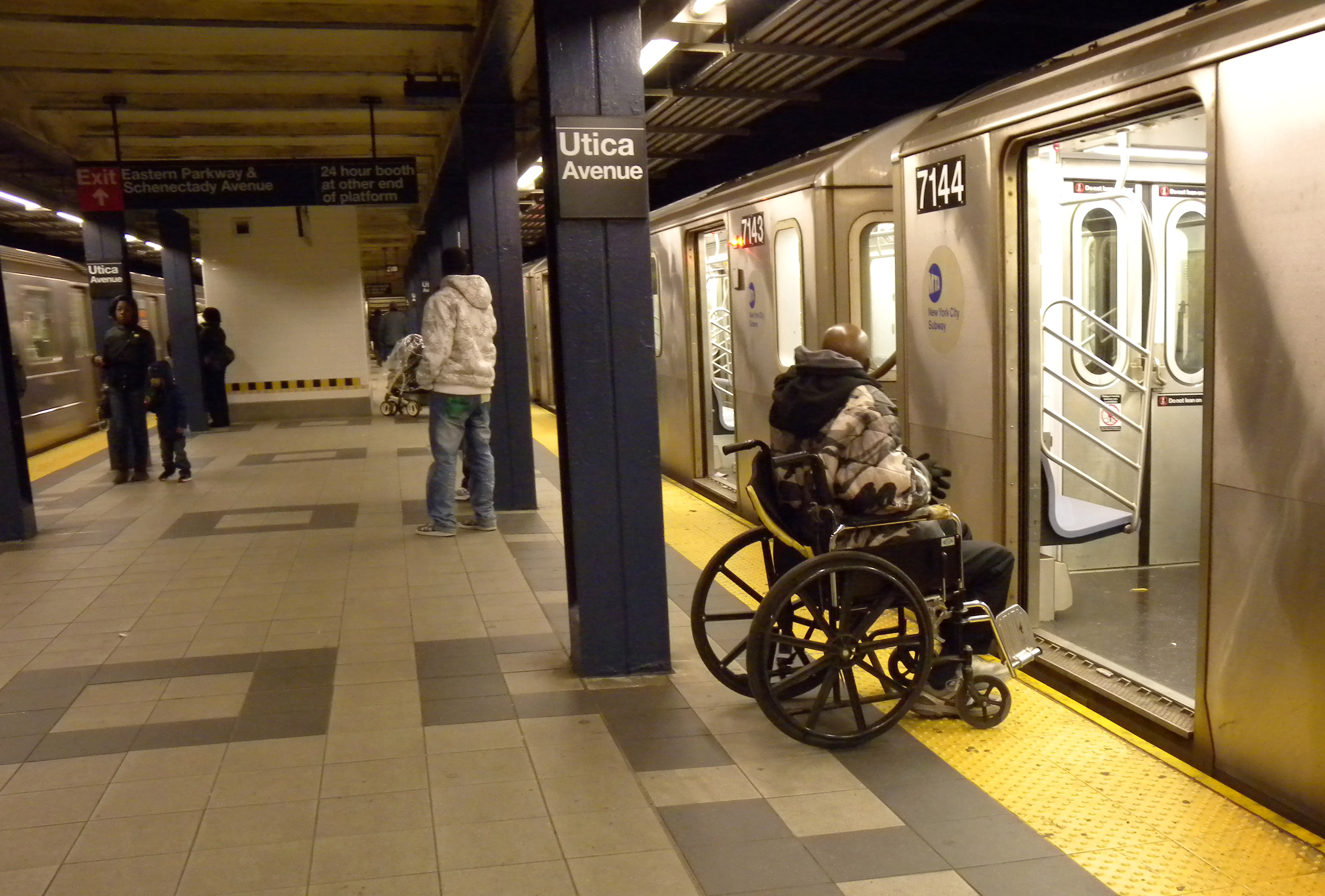
A passenger in a wheelchair boards a train at Crown Heights-Utica Avenue station in Brooklyn

The physical accessibility of the Metropolitan Transportation Authority (MTA)'s public transit network, serving the New York metropolitan area, is incomplete. Although all buses are wheelchair-accessible in compliance with the Americans with Disabilities Act of 1990 (ADA), much of the MTA's rail system was built before wheelchair access was a requirement under the ADA. This includes the MTA's rapid transit systems, the New York City Subway and Staten Island Railway, and its commuter rail services, the Long Island Rail Road (LIRR) and Metro-North Railroad. Consequently, most stations were not designed to be accessible to people with disabilities, and many MTA facilities lack accessible announcements, signs, tactile components, and other features.

A city law, the New York City Human Rights Law, prohibits discrimination on the basis of disability. Since 1990, elevators have been built in newly constructed stations to comply with the ADA, with most grade-level stations requiring little modification to meet ADA standards. The MTA identified 100 "key stations", high-traffic and/or geographically important stations on the subway system, which have been or are being renovated to comply with the ADA. (Note: The 100 key stations include 97 subway stations and three Staten Island Railway stations. They also count several station complexes as separate stations: for example, Times Square–42nd Street and 42nd Street–Port Authority Bus Terminal are collectively counted five times.) One of the key tenets of the 2018 Fast Forward Plan to rescue the subway system is to drastically increase the number of ADA-accessible subway stations, adding accessible facilities to 70 stations by 2024. In 2022, the MTA agreed in a settlement to make 95 percent of subway and Staten Island Railway stations accessible by 2055.

== Background ==
The Metropolitan Transportation Authority (MTA) has been gradually adding disabled access to its key stations since the 1980s, though large portions of the MTA's transit system are still inaccessible. According to the MTA:

In improving services to individuals with disabilities, the MTA identified stations and facilities where compliance with the Americans with Disabilities Act (ADA) would benefit the most people, analyzing such factors as high ridership, transfer points, and service to major areas of activity. These stations were given priority in our station-renovation program. We are continuing to expand accessibility features to more and more locations.

According to the MTA, fully accessible stations have:

- elevators or ramps
- handrails on ramps and stairs
- large-print and tactile-Braille signs
- audio and visual information systems, including Help Points or Public Address Customer Information Screens
- accessible station booth windows with sills located no more than 36 inches (91 cm) above the ground
- accessible OMNY Vending Machines
- accessible service entry gates
- platform-edge warning strips
- platform gap modifications or bridge plates to reduce or eliminate the gap between trains and platforms where it is greater than 2 inches (5.1 cm) vertically or 4 inches (10 cm) horizontally
- telephones at an accessible height with volume control, and text telephones (TTYs)
- accessible restrooms at stations with restrooms, if a 24-hour public toilet is in operation
  - Note: not all station buildings have restrooms.

Major bus stops are also required to have bus stop announcements under the ADA. The MTA is required to maintain these components under the ADA law; for instance, buses with malfunctioning lifts will be taken out of service.

=== History ===
==== 1970s and 1980s ====
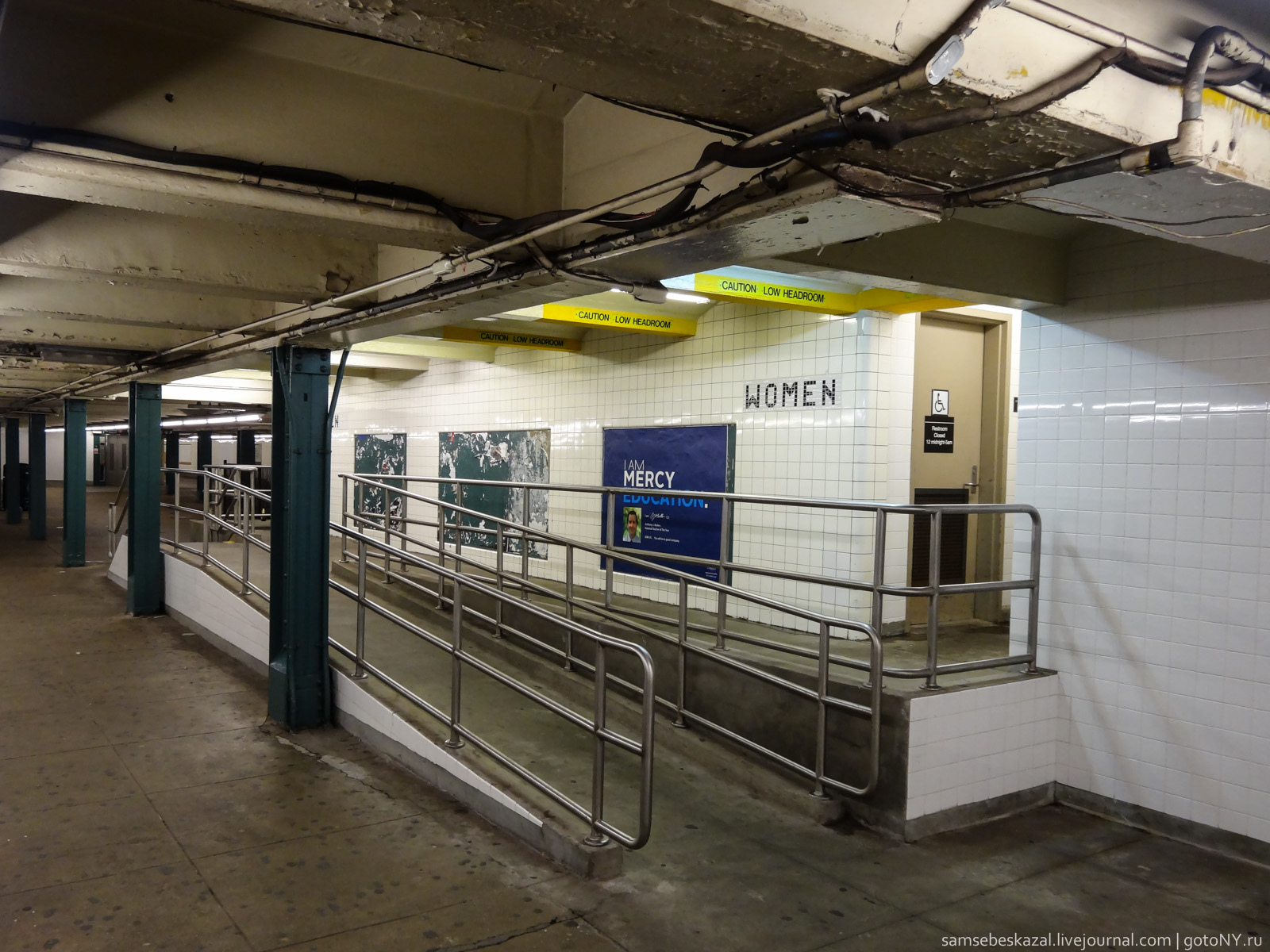
An accessible restroom at Church Avenue station on the IND Culver Line

In 1973, the Federal Rehabilitation Act of 1973 was signed into law. One provision of it, Section 504, was initially interpreted to require all public transit systems to become equally accessible to disabled people or risk losing federal funding. The MTA resisted this interpretation, arguing that making the required improvements would cost more than $1.5 billion. MTA Chairman Harold Fisher argued in favor of a separate transportation system for disabled people since it would be too expensive to make the regular system accessible. In 1980, the MTA Board voted to ignore the rule in spite of threats from the federal government that the agency would forfeit federal funding.

In September 1979, the Eastern Paralyzed Veterans Association (EPVA) filed a lawsuit in the New York Supreme Court that sought to block subway modernization projects from proceeding unless elevators were installed in stations, as per a state law that required that access for disabled riders be provided. This was the first lawsuit in New York challenging a state agency for not being in compliance with the Public Buildings Law, and the first lawsuit to argue state laws required public transit systems to add wheelchair lifts on buses and elevators in train and subway stations. The lawsuit also charged that the MTA was in defiance of New York's Human Rights Law, which outlaws discrimination, for denying people with disabilities from using public transit facilities. The EPVA decided to go ahead with the lawsuit despite the existence of the federal regulations because it feared a lawsuit by the American Public Transportation Association (APTA), which sought to overturn the rules as being financially burdensome, might be successful.

In 1981, the Reagan administration reinterpreted Section 504, requiring that transit agencies demonstrate that they were making their best efforts to provide adequate transportation for people in wheelchairs. As a result, the MTA agreed to purchase more than 2,000 buses with wheelchair lifts, which would make 50% of its bus fleet accessible. In 1983, less than a third of the system's 3,600 buses were equipped with these lifts.

In December 1982, the New York State Supreme Court ruled in favor of the EPVA, and on January 4, 1983, the Court judge officially signed an order that barred 10 station renovation projects in the MTA's first Capital Program from proceeding until an agreement was reached regarding accessibility in the New York City transit system, which the MTA appealed. The judge based the ruling on a state law that required wheelchair access to projects that were renovated using state funds. The MTA had argued that it had already provide a transportation option for people with disabilities by ordering buses with wheelchair lifts, and that the state law in question, the public buildings law, did not apply to subway stations, and that the planned projects were repairs, not renovations.

Work at ten station renovation projects underway were placed on hold, and work at 78 others were shelved by the MTA, which feared that work would again be halted by the courts. Following the decision, the MTA asked the New York State Legislature to exempt the agency from the law requiring transportation be accessible to people with disabilities. MTA Chairman Richard Ravitch said that "the costs of station accessibility are enormous and the benefits illusory", arguing that few people would use the elevators, and noting that it would cost $1 million to make each station accessible, and the high cost of maintenance and security requirements. The MTA had offered the EPVA to set up an on-request paratransit service, which the group rejected, while the EPVA offered to make 27 key stations accessible, including Fordham Road, Forest Hills–71st Avenue, Atlantic Avenue, Times Square–42nd Street, and 125th Street, which was rejected by the MTA.

In December 1983, State Senate Minority Leader Manfred Ohrenstein proposed legislation that would make 27 key stations accessible and provide funding for a paratransit service, allowing renovations at the 88 stations to commence. Following the announcement, the MTA entertained installing elevators at a limited number of stations being renovated for the first time. Senator Ohrenstein estimated that it would cost $25 to 35 million to make the 27 stations accessible, and cost $55 million per year for the paratransit service. $30 million of the cost for paratransit service would be borne by Transit Authority revenues, $7 million would come from fares, and the remainder would come from third party payments like Medicare and Medicaid. The proposed legislation listed ten stations in Manhattan, four in The Bronx, seven in Brooklyn, and six in Queens. The bill also would have required half of buses to be equipped with wheelchair lifts, and created a 15-member Handicapped Transportation Board to oversee the paratransit system.

In March 1984, the MTA, the office of Governor Mario Cuomo, and advocates for disabled people began working on an agreement to permit the agency to begin work on it subway station modernization program. On June 21, 1984, Mayor Ed Koch blocked an agreement that had been reached in principle to resolve the impasse. The agreement would have required the MTA to spend $5 million a year over eight years to make about 40 stations accessible and equipped every bus on the system with wheelchair lifts within fifteen years. He opposed making stations accessible, writing, "I have concluded that it is simply wrong to spend $50 million in the next eight years—and ultimately more—in putting elevators in the subways."

In June 1984, Governor Cuomo and the leaders of the State Assembly and State Senate reached a settlement agreement in spite of Mayor Koch's objections. The agreement amended the New York State Transportation and Building Laws to require the MTA to install elevators in 54 stations, of which 38 were designated in the legislation, while eight were to be chosen by the MTA, with the remaining eight to be chosen by a new 11-member New York City Transportation Disabled Committee. The MTA would be required to spend $5 million a year over eight years to make station accessible and to equip 65 percent of buses wheelchair lifts. At least eight stations had to become accessible within five years of when the legislation took effect. The New York City Transportation Disabled Committee would develop a plan for a pilot paratransit service within 210 days. The service would have a $5 million annual budget. The legislation was signed into law by Governor Cuomo on July 23, 1984, and the MTA Board approved a resolution in agreement with the legislation on July 25, 1984. A settlement agreement was approved on September 24, 1984, allowing the MTA to start work renovating 88 subway stations.

As late as 1988, prior to the opening of the Archer Avenue lines, there were still only four wheelchair-accessible stations in the subway system. Three of them were ground-level stations at Canarsie–Rockaway Parkway, Middle Village–Metropolitan Avenue, and Rockaway Park–Beach 116th Street; the other was the World Trade Center station in Lower Manhattan.

==== 1990s and 2000s ====
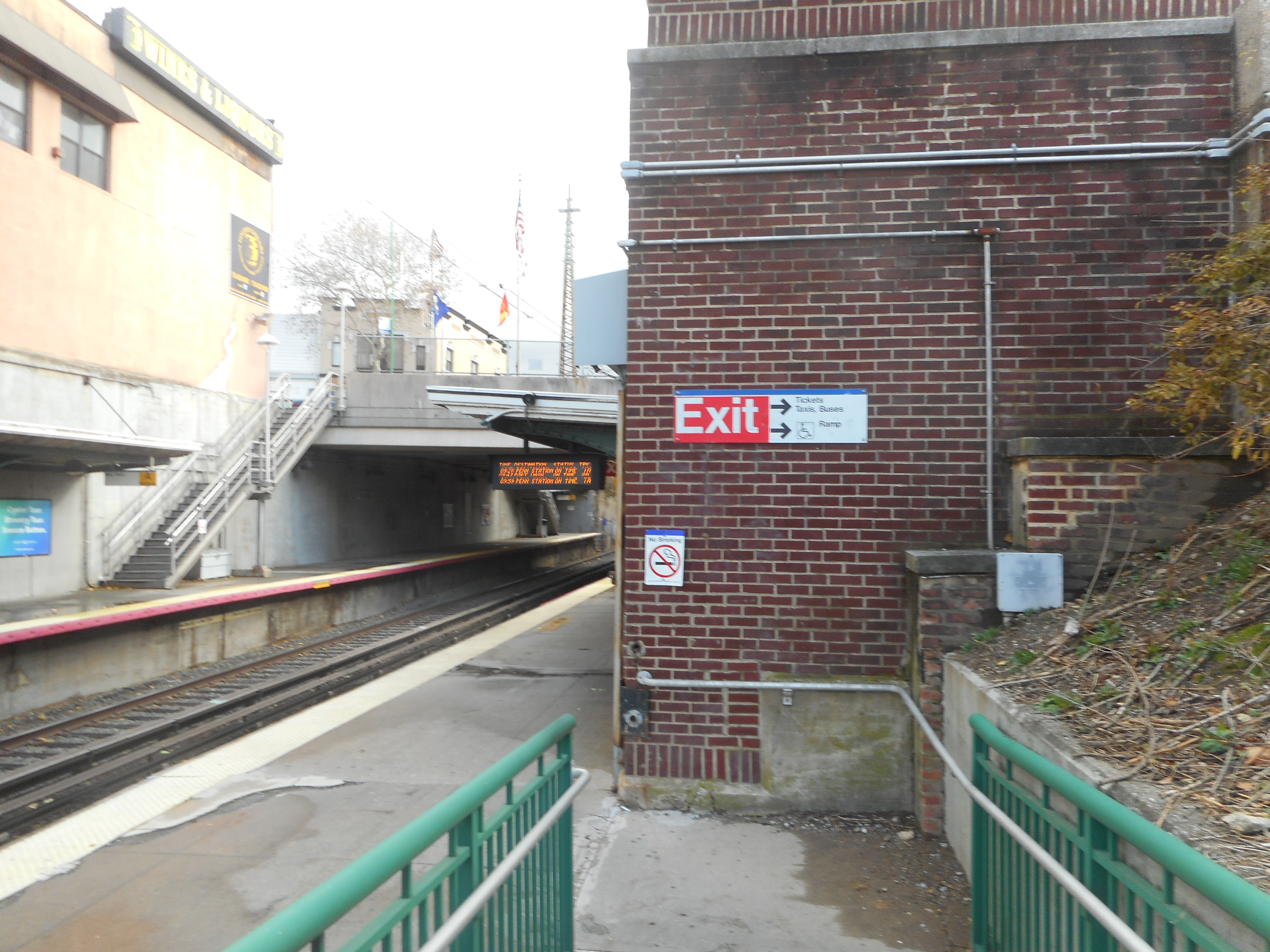
Rear of the accessible ramp along the eastbound platform of the Bayside Long Island Rail Road station

On July 26, 1990, the Americans with Disabilities Act of 1990 was signed into law, requiring all transit systems to making their services and facilities fully accessible to people with disabilities. A provision of the legislation required all transit agencies to submit a key station plan to the FTA by July 26, 1992. As part of the plan, agencies were required to include the methodology they used to select key stations and a timeline for the completion of the accessibility improvements. Though stations were required to be made accessible by July 1993, transit agencies were granted permission to extend the deadline by as many as thirty years. As part of New York City Transit's key station plan, 54 stations were to be made ADA-accessible by 2010.

Between 1986 and 1991, the number of disabled people using buses in New York City increased from 11,000 rides a year to 120,000. In 1991, ninety percent of buses were equipped with wheelchair lifts and ten of the 54 key stations were made wheelchair-accessible; at the time, 20 of 469 subway stations had ramps or elevators. The New York City Transit Authority had also made efforts to improve training for its employees and bus operators to on how to assist people with disabilities and on how to operate wheelchair lifts. At least one train car in each subway train had to be accessible by 1993, and major subway stations were supposed to be retrofitted with elevators or ramps by 1995.

The MTA created the New York City Transit ADA Compliance Coordination Committee (CCC) in June 1992. The committee works to coordinate the MTA's accessibility plan, as well as reaches out to disabled MTA riders. The MTA also provides training to disabled riders, the families of disabled riders, and mobility specialists. Between 1995 and 2019, it has trained 775 passengers.

In 1994, amendments were made to the New York State Transportation and Public Building Laws, increasing the key station obligation from 54 stations to a list of 100 stations to be completed by 2020. Of the 100 new stations, 91 were specified immediately, including 37 additional stations that were chosen in accordance with FTA and MTA criteria and discussions at five public forums. The remaining nine stations were to be selected following discussions with the Transportation Disabled Committee and public advocates. However, this revision also stipulated that the subway and Staten Island Railway were exempt from making accessibility modifications that were, by law, required for other public buildings.

Shortly after this modification, 66th Street–Lincoln Center (1 train) and Prospect Park–Brighton (B, Q, and S trains) were added to the list of 91 stations. There were also three options for modifying the list of 91 stations. They included adding Broadway–Lafayette Street (B, D, F, <F>, and M trains) and Bleecker Street (6 and <6> trains); replacing Broad Street with Chambers Street (both served by the J and Z trains) and Church Avenue with Kings Highway (both served by the B and Q trains); or modifying dates for several key stations. The public supported all of these options.

In February 1994, the MTA Board approved the submission of the bill to the Governor to expand the key station obligation from the 54 stations in the plan at the time and 37 additional stations to be completed through 2020. In May 1994, the Board approved the addition of contracts to make seven of the 37 stations accessible during station renovation projects between 1994 and 1996 to the 1992–1996 Capital Program. These stations were 14th Street, Eighth Avenue, 207th Street, Church Avenue, 72nd Street, Lexington Avenue and 47th–50th Streets–Rockefeller Center. The first two were set to be awarded in 1994, the next two in 1995, and the final three in 1996. The contracts were added on the assumption that the bill would be signed so as to not delay the projects and to avoid having to return to the stations after their renovation projects were completed to add elevators. These projects required $60.9 million.

The Federal Transit Administration approved the list of 95 key stations in June 2000. Far Rockaway–Mott Avenue (A train) and East 180th Street (2 and 5 trains) were added to the 100-station list in 2000 and 2002, respectively. Subsequently, a new South Ferry station (1 train) and the existing Eastern Parkway–Brooklyn Museum station (2, 3, 4, and 5 trains) were respectively selected in 2003 and 2004. The hundredth station was the subject of some debate, but the MTA ultimately decided to choose Bedford Park Boulevard (B and D trains).

The MTA started posting a list of out of service elevators and escalators on its website in August 2007. In December 2007, the MTA Board voted on a $1.3 million contract to connect the system's elevators and escalators to a computerized monitoring system so breakdowns could be dealt with more quickly.

==== 2010s ====
In October 2010, the United Spinal Association filed a class action lawsuit against the MTA for not making the Dyckman Street station accessible as part of a station renovation project, arguing that the agency violated the ADA by not allocating twenty percent of the project budget to improving access to disabled people. The MTA had not planned to make the station accessible due to a lack of funds, and as it was not identified by the agency as a key station. In July 2010, the United Spinal Association announced that it had reached a settlement with the MTA to install an elevator to the southbound platform of the station by 2014. An elevator was not installed to the northbound platform as the MTA argued that doing so was not feasible due to the layout of the landmarked station.

As part of the 2015–2019 Capital Program, $300 million was allocated to enhance station access and provide ADA-accessibility at fifteen stations chosen by the city. Four stations were chosen in January 2018: 170th Street (4 train), Broadway Junction (A and C trains' platforms), Livonia Avenue (L train), and Queensboro Plaza (7, <7>, N and W trains). Four more stations were being evaluated. These stations were the J and Z trains' platforms at Broadway Junction, as well as Union Street (R train), Vernon Boulevard–Jackson Avenue (7 and <7> trains), and East Broadway (F and <F> trains). In April 2018, the MTA added an ADA-accessibility project at Westchester Square–East Tremont Avenue (6 and <6> trains) as part of the 2015–2019 Capital Program.

The MTA hired Stantec in February 2018 to determine the feasibility and cost of making all subway stations ADA-accessible. The study Stantec completed was used to determine which stations would be made accessible the agency's 2020–2024 Capital Program. It found that it would be impossible to make the southbound platform at the 14th Street–Union Square station on the IRT Lexington Avenue Line accessible due to the station's curvature. In addition, making the Court Street station was not found to be feasible due to the significant amount of conduits that would have to be rerouted.

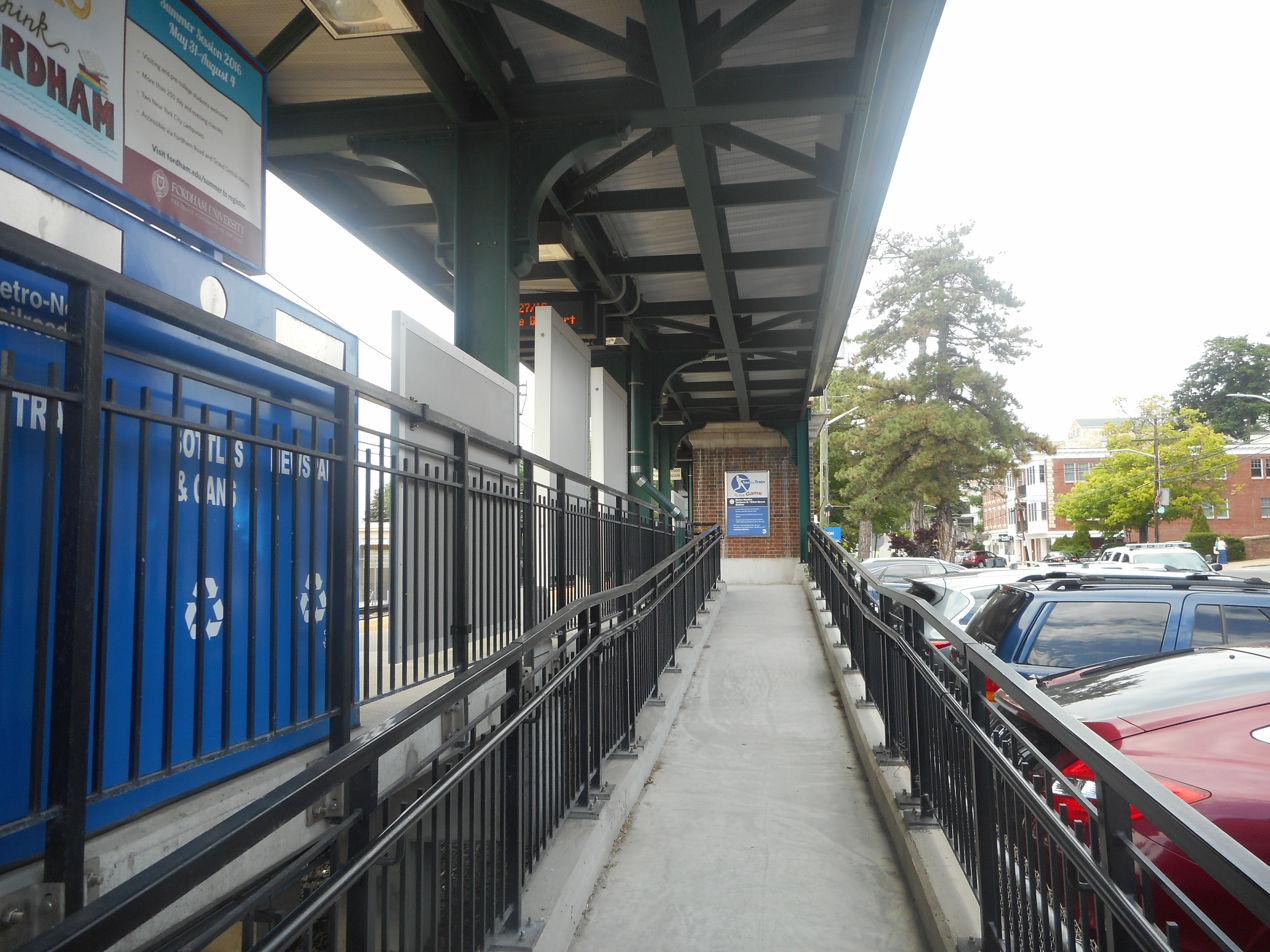
An accessible ramp leading to the northbound platform at the Irvington Metro-North station

In 2018, as part of the MTA's Fast Forward program to improve subway and bus service, an Executive Accessibility Advisor was hired at New York City Transit Authority chief Andy Byford's request, reporting directly to Byford. However, the MTA's efforts were still seen as inadequate. After a woman died in January 2019 from falling down a staircase at Seventh Avenue, a station with no elevators, officials criticized the MTA for not adding enough elevators, and one advocacy group released an unofficial map of stations that should receive accessibility upgrades.

In April 2019, the Suffolk Independent Living Organization filed a class action lawsuit against the MTA for not making the Amityville, Copiague, and Lindenhurst stations on the Long Island Rail Road accessible after the agency spent $5 million renovating escalators at the stations from 2015 to 2016. The MTA reached a settlement with the Suffolk Independent Living Organization on July 10, 2020, agreeing to make the three stations fully compliant with the ADA, including the installation of elevators. Work on these projects was to be completed by June 2023, with funding to come out of the MTA's 2020–2024 Capital Program. The elevators at these stations were finished in 2024.

==== 2020s to present ====
As of January 2022, ADA-accessibility projects are expected to be started or completed at 51 stations as part of the 2020–2024 Capital Program. This would allow one of every two to four stations on every line to be accessible, so that all non-accessible stops would be a maximum of two stops from an accessible station. In June 2018, it was announced that the Sixth Avenue station on the L train would receive elevators following the 14th Street Tunnel shutdown in 2019–2020. As part of the plan to add fifty ADA-accessible stations, the MTA surveyed the 345 non-accessible stations for possible ADA-accessibility. After the accessibility report was released in February 2019, the MTA indicated that it might possibly only retrofit 36 of 50 stations because of a lack of funding. However, in the draft 2020–2024 Capital Program released in September 2019, it was indicated that 66 stations might receive ADA improvements. Plans for ADA access at another 20 stations were announced that December. The news outlet The City did an analysis of the 2020–2024 Capital Program, and found that the cost of replacing nineteen elevators in the system in had doubled from $69 million to $134 million. The MTA established a "chief accessibility officer" position in 2021 to oversee its accessibility initiatives.

In December 2020, the MTA Board voted to approve a $149 million contract to install seventeen elevators to make seven subway stations and one Staten Island Railway station accessible, and a fifteen-year $8 million contract for elevator maintenance. The MTA used Federal grant money for the Penn Station Access project that would have otherwise expired. The initial cost to make these eight stations accessible was $581 million. The cost of the project was reduced by planning to make the stations accessible without constructing machine rooms, which require additional excavation and underground utility relocation. In January 2022, the MTA added a project to make Massapequa Park station on the LIRR ADA-accessible to the 2020–2024 Capital Program.

In early 2021, the MTA announced it was proposing a zoning law, Zoning for Accessibility (ZFA), which would increase the number of subway elevators by placing many of them on private property. Under the proposed legislation, developers of lots adjacent to subway stations would meet with the MTA to determine whether an elevator entrance could be constructed. If such an entrance was included in a building, the developers could receive "density bonuses" that would allow them to add more space in their buildings. The New York City Council approved ZFA in October 2021, and the first project under the ZFA program was announced two months later.

In June 2022, as part of a settlement for two class-action lawsuits, the MTA proposed making 95 percent of subway and Staten Island Railway stations accessible by 2055. This would require installing elevators and ramps at 81 stations before 2025; at another 85 stations between 2025 and 2035; and at 90 additional stations in each of the next two decades. Due to technical limitations, about five percent of stations could not accommodate either elevators or ramps.

Also in 2021, the MTA announced it would install wide-aisle fare gates at five subway stations. After partnering with Cubic to design the fare gates, the MTA would replace existing equipment at select locations in order to make station access easier for wheelchair users and passengers with other wheeled devices such as walkers, strollers, and suitcases. Two years later, as part of a plan to improve bike access in the subway, the agency announced the five stations planned to receive the new fare gates: Astoria Boulevard and Sutphin Boulevard/JFK Airport in Queens, Bowling Green and 34th Street-Penn Station in Manhattan, and Atlantic Avenue-Barclays Center in Brooklyn. The implementation of these fare gates was delayed; the MTA's chief accessibility officer indicated in February 2023 that the new fare gates would be installed at the Sutphin Boulevard–Archer Avenue–JFK Airport and Atlantic Avenue–Barclays Center stations shortly afterward. As part of this primarily cyclist-focused initiative, the MTA also agreed to consider providing larger elevator cab sizes and elevator redundancy at stations. In November 2022, the MTA announced that it would award a $965 million contract for the installation of 21 elevators across eight stations, and the contract was awarded the next month. The same month, MTA also announced that it would award a $146 million contract for the installation of eight elevators across four stations. Further contracts for accessibility upgrades at 13 rapid transit stations were awarded in late 2023. Accessibility upgrades to three Metro-North stations began in June 2025.

The MTA planned to fund several accessibility projects with revenue from congestion pricing in New York City, which was implemented in 2025. In August 2024, a state judge indicated that the city government might have to pay for platform modifications at several stations, to reduce gaps between the train and platform. As part of the MTA's 2025–2029 Capital Program, the agency indicated that it would make 60 additional subway stations and 6 commuter rail stations ADA-accessible, which would cost $7.1 billion in total. According to Curbed, the high costs of these upgrades were attributed in part to tangentially related projects such as equipment upgrades, since the elevators themselves only cost $5 million apiece on average. In July 2025, the MTA announced that it would install elevators at another 12 stations.

=== Inaccessibility ===
The MTA has been criticized for its inaccessibility, particularly in the New York City Subway. As of September 2021, just 28% of the city's 472 subway stations were accessible, among the lowest percentages of any major transit system in the world. In the 2010s, there were some lines where two accessible stations are separated by ten or more non-accessible stops. A report from the New York City Comptroller published in July 2018 found that, out of the 189 neighborhoods officially recognized by the city, 122 had at least one subway station, but only 62 of these neighborhoods had accessible stations. Even at some stations that are otherwise ADA-accessible (such as 59th Street–Columbus Circle and Times Square–42nd Street), the gaps between the trains and platforms exceed the maximum gap allowed by the ADA.

Some places such as Woodlawn, South Brooklyn, and Stapleton, as well as neighborhoods with large elderly or young populations, do not have any accessible stations. The Comptroller's report found that approximately 640,000 young, elderly, or disabled residents in the city did not have access to any nearby accessible stations, while another 760,000 residents did have such access. As a result, the unemployment rate tends to be higher among disabled residents of New York City. Additionally, the 25% labor force participation rate among disabled residents is one-third that of non-disabled residents' labor force participation rate of 75%. If elevators at some stations broke down, disabled riders would have to take a circuitous route to reach their destination. Between 2017 and 2023, the subway system's elevators were operational more than 95% of the time on average, but disability-rights advocates said in 2023 that 25 elevators broke down every day on average.

In contrast to the MTA, all but one of Boston's MBTA subway stations are accessible, the Chicago "L" plans all stations to be accessible in the 2030s, the Toronto subway was to be fully accessible by 2025, and Montreal Metro plans all stations to be accessible by 2038. Both the Boston and Chicago systems are as old or older than the New York City Subway, though all of these systems have fewer stations than the New York City Subway. Newer systems like the Washington Metro and Bay Area Rapid Transit have been fully accessible from their opening in the 1970s.

==== Corridors and major stations ====
Many transfer stations, such as Broadway Junction on the A, C, J, L, and Z trains and Delancey Street/Essex Street on the F, <F>, J, M, and Z trains are not wheelchair-accessible, making it harder to travel between different parts of the city. The Rockaway Park Shuttle, which typically runs from Broad Channel to Rockaway Park–Beach 116th Street, has only one accessible station. Several stations also only contain elevators leading from street level to their respective mezzanines. (Note: These stations include: All stations where only part of the station complex is accessible, but a given set of platforms are not (Note: The seven station complexes, along with their inaccessible services, are: 14th Street–Union Square (4, 5, 6, and <6> trains); 168th Street (1 train); Borough Hall/Court Street (N, R, and W trains); Canal Street (N, Q, R, and W trains; J and Z trains); Chambers Street–World Trade Center/Park Place/Cortlandt Street (2 and 3 trains; A and C trains); Court Square–23rd Street (northbound E, F, and <F> trains); South Ferry/Whitehall Street (N, R, and W trains)); 42nd Street–Bryant Park/Fifth Avenue (7, <7>, B, D, F, <F>, and M trains) (Note: The 42nd Street–Bryant Park/Fifth Avenue station already has elevators between ground and mezzanine, but none to any of the platforms.); 57th Street–Seventh Avenue (N, Q, R, and W trains) (Note: The 57th Street–Seventh Avenue already had an elevator between the ground and mezzanine. This elevator is not part of the current accessible entrance.); 181st Street and 191st Street (1 train); 190th Street (A train); Briarwood (E, F, and <F> trains) (Note: The Briarwood station already has an elevator between ground and mezzanine, but none to either of the platforms.); Clark Street (2 and 3 trains); Hoyt–Schermerhorn Streets (A, C, and G trains) (Note: The Hoyt–Schermerhorn Streets station already has an elevator between ground and mezzanine, but none to any of the platforms.)) Additionally, some stations on the LIRR are not accessible.

Several stations that serve major sports venues in the metropolitan area also have little to no accessibility; the Mets–Willets Point subway station, located adjacent to Citi Field (home of the New York Mets), is only accessible through a ramp at a southern side platform, which are only open during special events. Similarly, the connecting Long Island Rail Road station of the same name is not ADA-compliant, nor is the LIRR station serving Belmont Park. The Aqueduct Racetrack subway station, serving the eponymous racetrack in South Ozone Park, was inaccessible until 2013, following a two-year renovation project at the behest of Resorts World Casino, which opened near the racetrack in 2011. Although all New York City buses are accessible, transfers between bus routes, as well as the bus trips themselves, are usually cumbersome because buses run at a much lower frequency than the subway does.

==== Legal issues ====
As per the ADA, if a station is significantly modified, at least 20% of the renovation's cost must be spent on ADA improvements, but this is not always the case in the New York City Subway system. For example, the Smith–Ninth Streets station was renovated for two years and reopened in 2013 without any elevators. None of the stations being renovated under the Enhanced Station Initiative, which began in 2017, are proposed to include elevators, except for the stations already equipped with them (e.g. Hunts Point Avenue). The lack of elevators at one station renovated through the ESI, the Cathedral Parkway–110th Street station at Frederick Douglass Boulevard, drew protests by a member of the City Council, a State Senator, and disability rights activists.

There have been several lawsuits over this issue. What is believed to have likely been the first such suit was based on state law and was filed in 1979 by the Eastern Paralyzed Veterans Association. In 2011, the MTA added a single elevator at the Dyckman Street station (1 train) after a lawsuit by the United Spinal Association midway during the station's renovation. In 2016, the MTA was sued by another disability rights group for not installing an elevator at the Middletown Road station during a 2014 renovation. Similarly, in 2017, disability rights groups filed a class-action suit against the MTA because the subway in general was inaccessible, which violated both state and federal laws; the groups wanted the agency to keep its elevators in a state of good repair. A federal court dismissed the 2017 lawsuit after the MTA argued that the subway's elevators were operational at least 96.5% of the time, though the dismissal was overturned on appeal. In 2026, the MTA and disability rights advocates reached a settlement in the 2017 lawsuit, which requires the MTA's elevators to be operational 95% of the time, and mandates accessibility training for employees, improved signage for customers, and real-time elevator status updates.

The federal government sued the MTA in March 2018 over a lack of elevators at Middletown Road and the Enhanced Station Initiative stops. In March 2019, federal district judge Edgardo Ramos ruled that all subway station renovations that "affect the station's usability" must include upgrades to make the station fully accessible unless it is deemed unfeasible to do so. In February 2021, the state-court case reached class-action status with over 500,000 plaintiffs; the class-action lawsuit was resolved as part of the June 2022 settlement with the MTA.

== Station count ==
System	Accessible station count	Overall station count	Percentage
NYC Subway (individual)	163	472	35%
NYC Subway (combined)	133	423 (Note: A list of all station complexes is given at List of New York City Subway transfer stations. The MTA denotes each station with a station ID, and if the station is part of a complex, also denotes a separate complex ID.)	31%
Staten Island Railway	6	21	29%
Long Island Rail Road	107	124	85%
Metro-North Railroad	79	124	64%
Overall system (Note: When conforming to international standards, there are six commuter rail stations that have a direct connection to subway services (i.e., a connection could be made without exiting the structure, or traveling along the street). This count was conducted by condensing all subway and rail stations with direct connecting infrastructure as one complex. This excludes stations that are close in proximity, but have no share mezzanine or connecting passageway (E.g. The subway and rail stations along Main Street in Flushing, Queens requires a walk on street level, and has no connecting infrastructure or passageway between the separate stations, and thus does not count as a connecting complex). The six rail stations that currently share connecting infrastructure with seven subway stations are as follows: Atlantic Terminal, with a connection to the 2, 3, 4, 5, B, D, N, Q, R and W trains at Atlantic Avenue–Barclays Center: connection is made indoors. This consists of one LIRR station and one subway complex.; Grand Central Terminal, with a connection to the 4, 5, 6, <6>, 7, <7>, and S trains at Grand Central–42nd Street: connection is made indoors. This consists of one Metro-North station and one subway complex.; Jamaica, with a connection to the E, J, and Z trains at Sutphin Boulevard–Archer Avenue–JFK Airport: connection is via station house. This consists of one LIRR station and one subway station.; Mets–Willets Point, with a connection to the 7 and <7> trains at Mets–Willets Point: connection is via pedestrian bridge. This consists of one LIRR station and one subway station.; Pennsylvania Station, with a connection to the 1, 2, and 3 trains at 34th Street–Penn Station (Seventh Avenue), and the A, C, and E trains at 34th Street–Penn Station (Eighth Avenue): connection is made indoors. This consists of one LIRR station and two subway stations.; Woodside, with a connection to the 7 and <7> trains at 61st Street–Woodside: connection is via connecting mezzanine. This consists of one LIRR station and one subway station.; With the exception of Mets–Willets Point, these rail stations and their corresponding subway stations are all fully or mostly ADA-accessible.)	298	686	43%

== Rapid transit ==
=== New York City Subway ===
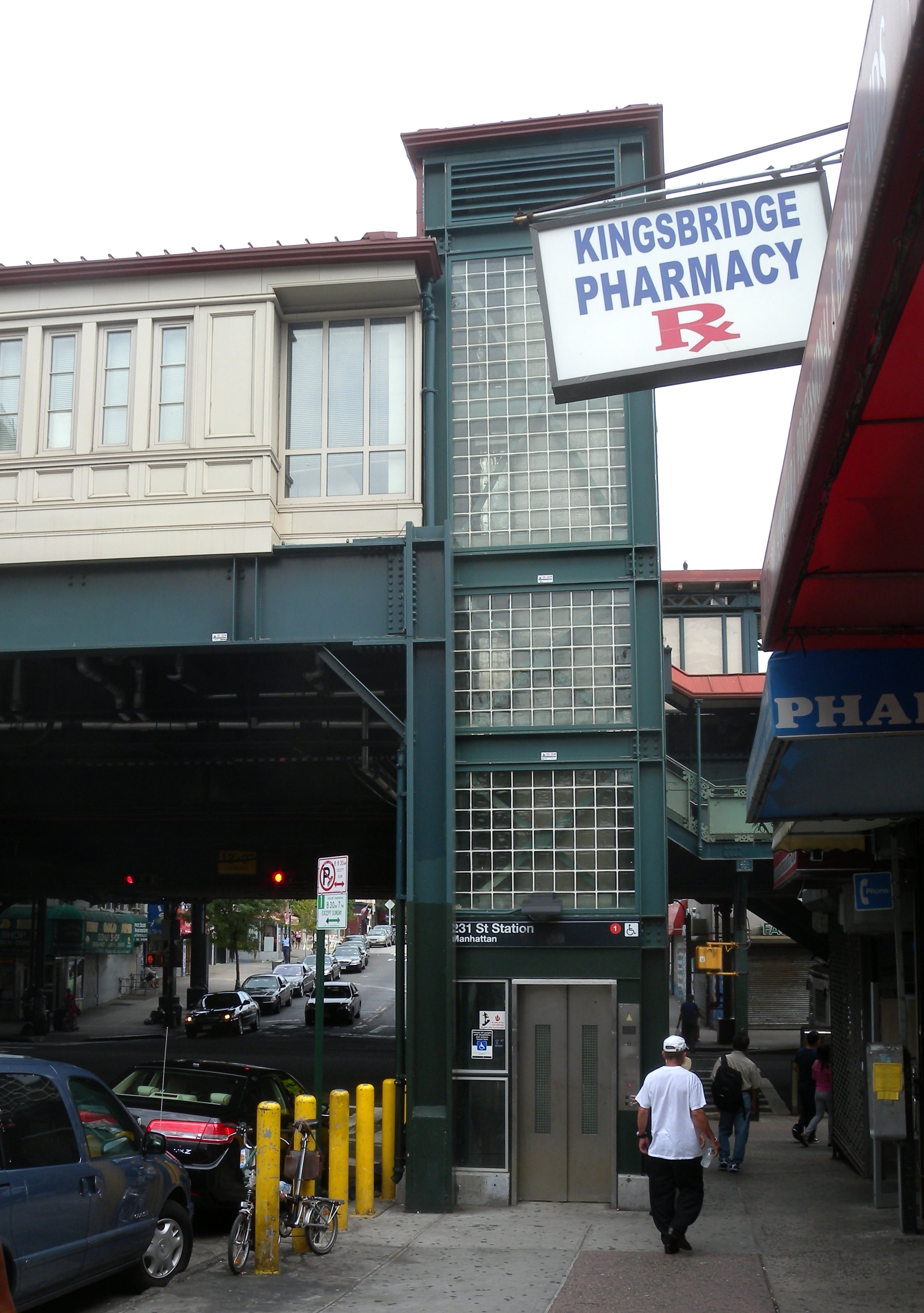
An elevator at the elevated 231st Street station

As of June 2026, out of 472 total stations in the New York City Subway system, 163 (or 35%) are accessible to some extent; (Note: This includes station complexes but excludes some non-accessible platforms at such complexes.) many of them have AutoGate access. If station complexes are counted as one, then 133 out of the system's 423 stations are accessible to some extent (or 31%). There are 21 more non-ADA-accessible stations with cross-platform interchanges, as well as other same-platform transfers, designed to handle wheelchair transfers.

The MTA sought to make 100 "key stations" accessible by 2020 to comply with the ADA, of which 97 were accessible, 2 under construction, and one (68th Street–Hunter College station) under design by that year. It has retrofitted dozens of "non-key stations" as well. Many subway stations have elevators that travel between the mezzanine and street (outside the fare control area), as well as elevators between the mezzanine and platforms (within the fare control area). As of 2025, some stations are being retrofitted with elevators that travel directly from the street to the platform, bypassing existing mezzanines; this arrangement eliminates the need for additional elevators to the mezzanine, thus saving money.

Because of how they were designed, many existing subway stations were built with narrow platforms, as such making it difficult to install wheelchairs in such stations. Seven station complexes in the system have a mix of accessible platforms and non-accessible platforms.

==== Manhattan ====
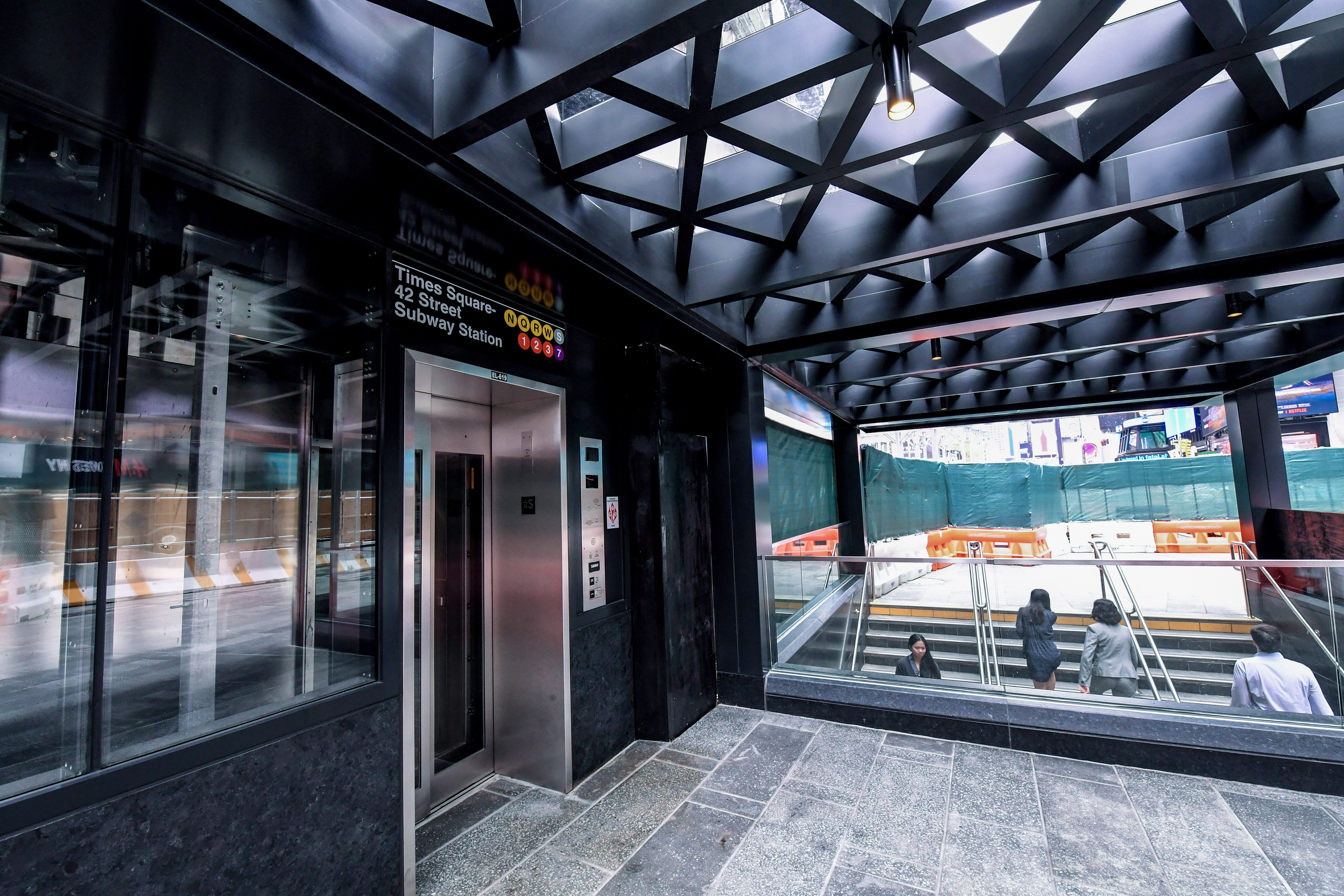
An elevator at the Times Square–42nd Street station complex

As of October 2026, there are 69 ADA-compliant stations in Manhattan out of 153 (45%), (Note: Canal Street (Broadway) and Chambers Street–World Trade Center both contain separate local and express platforms and are both part of a larger station complex. However, both are counted by the MTA as one station within their respective complex.) or 48 (40%) if stations in complexes are counted as one. (Note: Several station complexes are counted as one station by both MTA and international standards.) Stations built after 1990 are marked with an asterisk (*).

Station	Services	Accessible entrance and notes
First Avenue	"L" train	Elevator for westbound service at northwest corner of East 14th Street and Avenue A.; Elevator for eastbound service at southwest corner of East 14th Street and Avenue A.
14th Street/Eighth Avenue	"A" train "C" train "E" train "L" train	Elevator at northwest corner of West 14th Street and Eighth Avenue.
14th Street/Sixth Avenue	"1" train "2" train "3" train "F" train "F" express train "M" train "L" train	Elevator at northeast corner of West 14th Street and Sixth Avenue for L and northbound F, <F>, and M.; Elevator at northwest corner of West 14th Street and Sixth Avenue for L and southbound F, <F>, and M (connects to passageway to 14th Street-Seventh Avenue 1, 2, and 3 station).; Elevator at southwest corner of West 14th Street and Seventh Avenue for 1, 2, and 3 (connects to passageway to Sixth Avenue L and 14th Street F, <F>, and M stations).
14th Street–Union Square	"N" train "Q" train "R" train "W" train "L" train	Elevator at northeast corner of East 14th Street and Union Square East (Park Avenue South). Note: 4, 5, 6, and <6> platforms are not ADA-compliant.
23rd Street–Baruch College	"4" train "6" train "6" express train	Elevator for northbound service at northeast corner of East 23rd Street and Park Avenue South.; Elevator for southbound service at northwest corner of East 23rd Street and Park Avenue South.
28th Street	"4" train "6" train "6" express train	Elevator at southwest corner of East 28th Street and Park Avenue South. Note: accessible for southbound trains only.
34th Street–Herald Square	"B" train "D" train "F" train "F" express train "M" train "N" train "Q" train "R" train "W" train	Elevator at Herald Center building on west side of Broadway south of West 34th Street.
34th Street–Hudson Yards*	"7" train "7" express train	Elevator near the southwest corner of Hudson Park & Boulevard and West 34th Street.
34th Street–Penn Station	"1" train "2" train "3" train	Elevator on south side of West 34th Street west of 7th Avenue at LIRR entrance to Penn Station.; Elevator at northwest corner of 7th Avenue & West 33rd Street.
34th Street–Penn Station	"A" train "C" train "E" train	Elevator at southeast corner of West 34th Street and Eighth Avenue.
42nd Street–Port Authority Bus Terminal	"A" train "C" train "E" train	Elevator inside Port Authority Bus Terminal on 8th Ave between West 41st and West 42nd Streets.; Elevator and manually–operated lift at southwest corner of 8th Avenue and West 44th Street.; Note: The passageway ramp used to transfer between A, C, and E and 1, 2, 3, 7, <7>, N, Q, R, W, and S trains is not ADA-compliant.
47th–50th Streets–Rockefeller Center	"B" train "D" train "F" train "F" express train "M" train	Elevator at northwest corner of 6th Avenue and West 49th Street.
49th Street	"N" train "Q" train "R" train "W" train	Elevator at northeast corner of West 49th Street and Seventh Avenue. Note: accessible for northbound trains only.
50th Street	"C" train "E" train	Elevator on northwest corner of West 49th Street and Eighth Avenue. Note: accessible for southbound trains only.
57th Street	"F" train "M" train	Elevator at southwest corner of West 56th Street and 6th Avenue.
57th Street–7th Avenue	"N" train "Q" train "R" train "W" train	Elevator at northeast corner of West 55th Street and 7th Avenue.; Elevator at southwest corner of West 57th Street and 7th Avenue. Note: elevator at West 57th Street is not ADA-compliant.
59th Street–Columbus Circle	"1" train "2" train "A" train "B" train "C" train "D" train	Elevator at northwest corner of Columbus Circle and Central Park West.; Elevator at southwest corner of 8th Avenue and Columbus Circle.
66th Street–Lincoln Center	"1" train "2" train	Elevator for northbound service at southeast corner of West 66th Street and Broadway.; Elevator for southbound service at southwest corner of West 66th Street and Broadway.
68th Street–Hunter College	"4" train "6" train "6" express train	Elevator at northeast corner of East 68th Street and Lexington Avenue.
72nd Street	"1" train "2" train "3" train	Elevators inside station house on north side of West 72nd Street between Broadway and Amsterdam Avenue.
72nd Street*	"N" train "Q" train "R" train	Quintet of elevators at southeast corner of Second Avenue and East 72nd Street.
86th Street	"4" train "6" train "6" express train	Elevator on northeast corner of East 86th Street and Lexington Avenue. Note: accessible for northbound local trains only.
86th Street*	"N" train "Q" train "R" train	Elevator at southeast corner of East 86th Street and Second Avenue.
96th Street	"1" train "2" train "3" train	Elevators inside station house in median of Broadway; entrances on south side of West 96th Street and north side of West 95th Street.
96th Street*	"N" train "Q" train "R" train	Elevator in plaza on west side of Second Avenue between East 95th and East 96th Streets.
125th Street	"4" train "5" train "6" train "6" express train	Elevator at northeast corner of East 125th Street and Lexington Avenue.
125th Street	"A" train "B" train "C" train "D" train	Elevator at southwest corner of West 125th Street and Saint Nicholas Avenue.
135th Street	"2" train "3" train	Elevator for northbound service at northeast corner of West 135th Street and Lenox Avenue.; Elevator for southbound service at southwest corner of West 135th Street and Lenox Avenue.
137th Street–City College	"1" train	Elevator for northbound service at northeast corner of Broadway and West 137th Street.; Elevator for southbound service at southwest corner of Broadway and West 137th Street.
168th Street	"A" train "C" train	Elevator at southeast corner of West 168th Street and Saint Nicholas Avenue for A and C only. Note: elevators to 1 platforms are not ADA-compliant.
175th Street	"A" train	Elevator at northeast corner of West 177th Street and Fort Washington Avenue.
181st Street	"A" train	Elevators inside station house on the east side of Fort Washington Avenue between West 183rd and West 185th Streets, across from Bennett Park.; Wheelchair ramp entrance at northwest corner of West 184th Street and Overlook Terrace.
Bowling Green	"4" train "5" train	Elevator to northbound platform and lower mezzanine level at northeast corner of Broadway and Battery Place.; Note: The elevator to lower mezzanine level and southbound platform resides within the fare control area of this station.
Broadway–Lafayette Street/Bleecker Street	"4" train "6" train "6" express train "B" train "D" train "F" train "F" express train "M" train	Elevator at northwest corner of Lafayette and Houston Streets.
Brooklyn Bridge–City Hall/Chambers Street	"4" train "5" train "6" train "6" express train "J" train "Z" train	Elevator on west side of Centre Street south of Chambers Street.
Canal Street	"4" train "6" train "6" express train	Elevator for northbound service at northeast corner of Canal Street and Lafayette Street.; Elevator for southbound service at northwest corner of Canal Street and Lafayette Street. Note: N, Q, R, W, J and Z platforms are not ADA-compliant.
Chambers Street	"1" train "2" train "3" train	Elevator at northwest corner of Hudson and Chambers Streets.
Cortlandt Street/World Trade Center	"N" train "R" train "W" train "E" train	Elevators at southwest corner of Dey Street/Broadway and northeast corner on John Street/Broadway, shared by 4 and 5 trains.; Elevator at southeast corner of Church Street and Park Place. Note: 2, 3, A, and C platforms are not ADA-compliant.
Dyckman Street	"1" train	Elevators inside station house at southwest corner of Hillside Avenue and St. Nicholas Avenue/Ft. George Hill (accessible via wheelchair ramp at street level).
Fulton Street	"2" train "3" train "4" train "5" train "A" train "C" train "J" train "Z" train	Elevators at southwest corner of Dey Street/Broadway and northeast corner of John St/Broadway for 4 and 5 trains, connection to N, R, and W trains.; Elevator at northeast corner of Fulton and Nassau Streets for A, C, J and Z trains; Elevator at southwest corner of Fulton and William Streets for A, C, 2 and 3 trains.
Grand Central–42nd Street	"4" train "5" train "6" train "6" express train "7" train "7" express train 42nd Street Shuttle	Elevator to mezzanine inside main entrance, immediately to the right of Grand Central Terminal entrance (East 42nd Street between Park and Lexington Avenues).; Elevator at northwest corner of East 42nd Street and Lexington Avenue.
Harlem–148th Street	"3" train	Wheelchair ramp inside station house at the east end of the intersection of West 149th Street and Adam Clayton Powell Jr. Boulevard (7th Avenue).
Inwood–207th Street	"A" train	Elevator at northwest corner of Broadway and West 207th Street.
Lexington Avenue/51st Street	"4" train "6" train "6" express train "E" train "F" train "F" express train	Elevator at northeast corner of East 52nd Street and Lexington Avenue.
Lexington Avenue–63rd Street	"F" train "M" train "N" train "Q" train "R" train	Elevator on north side of East 63rd Street west of Lexington Avenue.; Elevator at northwest corner of East 63rd Street and Third Avenue.
Roosevelt Island	"F" train "M" train	Elevators at station house.
South Ferry*	"1" train	Elevator at SW corner of Whitehall and State Streets. Note: N, R, and W platforms are not ADA-compliant.
Spring Street	"C" train "E" train	Elevator at southwest corner of Spring Street and Sixth Avenue. Note: accessible for southbound trains only; elevator for northbound platform in planning as part of 2025–2029 Capital Program.
Times Square–42nd Street	"1" train "2" train "3" train "7" train "7" express train "N" train "Q" train "R" train "W" train 42nd Street Shuttle	Elevators at southeast corner of 7th Avenue and West 42nd Street and northwest corner of Broadway and West 42nd Street.; Notes: The passageway ramp used to transfer between 1, 2, 3, 7, <7>, N, Q, R, W, and S and A, C, and E trains is not ADA-compliant.; The passageway ramp used to transfer between 1, 2, 3, 7, <7>, N, Q, R, W, and S and B, D, F, <F>, and M trains is not ADA-compliant. (The B, D, F, <F>, and M trains' platforms at 42nd Street–Bryant Park are also not ADA-compliant.)
West 4th Street– Washington Square	"A" train "C" train "E" train "B" train "D" train "F" train "F" express train "M" train	Elevator at northeast corner of 6th Avenue and West 3rd Street.
WTC Cortlandt*	"1" train	Elevator at southwest corner of Greenwich and Vesey Streets.

==== The Bronx ====
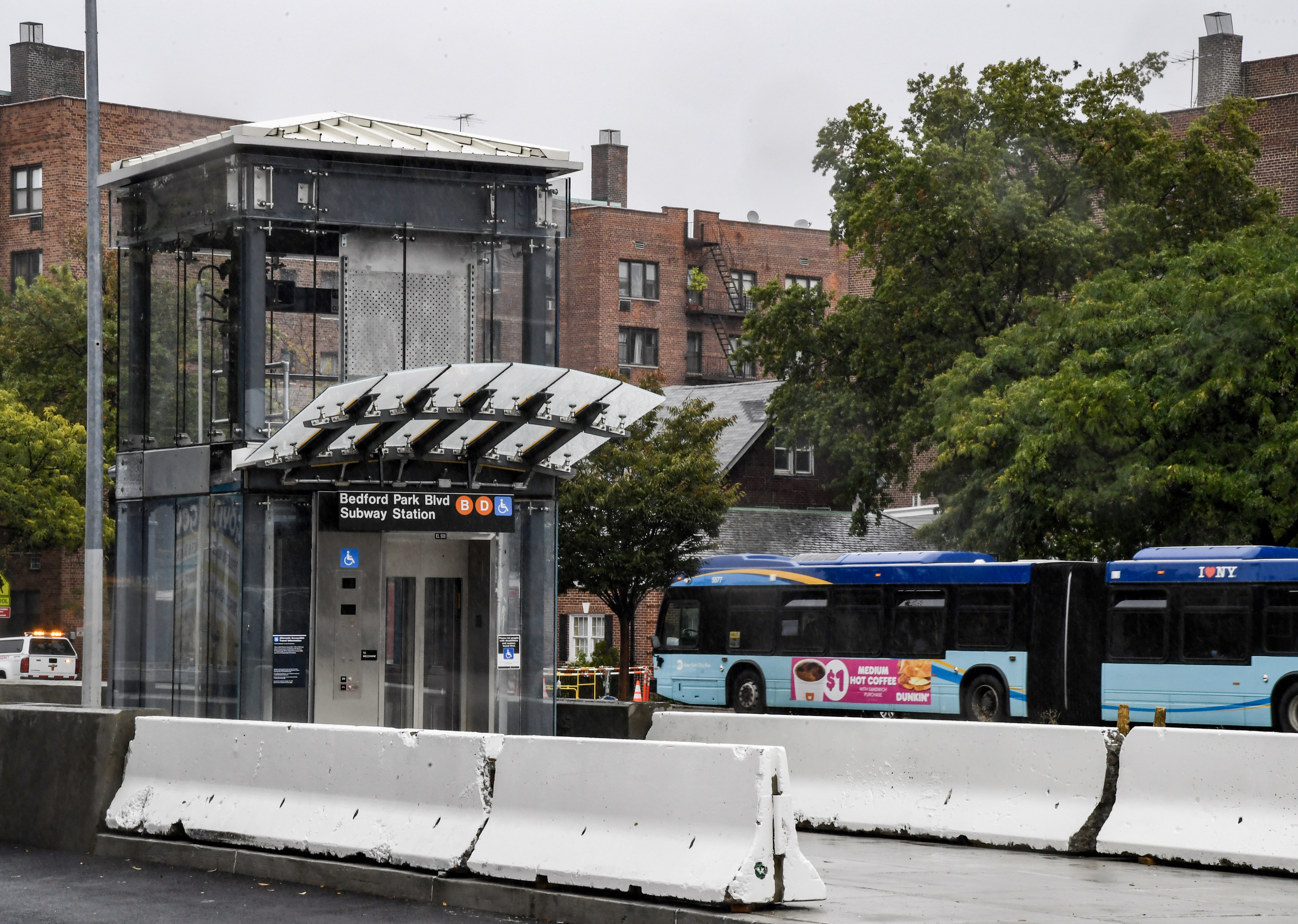
Elevator at the Bedford Park Boulevard station

As of September 2026, there are 23 ADA-compliant stations in the Bronx out of 70 (33%), or 21 (31%) if stations in complexes are counted as one.

Station	Services	Accessible entrance and notes
Third Avenue–149th Street	"2" train "5" train	Elevator for northbound service at southwest corner of East 149th Street and 3rd Avenue.; Elevator for southbound service at northwest corner of East 149th Street and Melrose Avenue.
149th Street–Hostos	"2" train "4" train "5" train	Elevator at southwest corner of East 149th Street and Grand Concourse.
161st Street–Yankee Stadium	"4" train "B" train "D" train	Elevator at northeast corner of East 161st Street (service road) and River Avenue.; Note: The elevator only runs from street to lower mezzanine level for B and D trains. Use secondary elevator inside fare control to reach the upper mezzanine level and platforms for the 4 train.
170th Street	"4" train	Elevator at southeast corner of East 170th Street and Jerome Avenue.
231st Street	"1" train	Elevator for northbound service at southeast corner of West 231 Street and Broadway.; Elevator for southbound service at southwest corner of West 231 Street and Broadway.
233rd Street	"2" train "5" train	Elevator at northwest corner of White Plains Road and East 233rd Street.
Bedford Park Boulevard	"B" train "D" train	Elevator at northwest corner of Grand Concourse (main road) and Bedford Park Boulevard.
East 149th Street	"6" train	Elevator for northbound service at southeast corner of East 149th Street and Southern Boulevard.; Elevator for southbound service at northwest corner of East 149th Street and Southern Boulevard.
East 180th Street	"2" train "5" train	Elevators inside station house at northwest corner of East 180th Street and Morris Park Avenue (accessible via wheelchair ramp at street level).
Fordham Road	"4" train	Elevator at southeast corner of Jerome Avenue and East Fordham Road.
Gun Hill Road (Seymour Avenue)	"5" train	Elevators inside station house on south side of East Gun Hill Road between Sexton and Dewitt Places.
Gun Hill Road (White Plains Road)	"2" train "5" train	Elevators inside main entrance in White Plains Road median between East Gun Hill Road and East 211th Street.
Hunts Point Avenue	"6" train "6" express train	Elevator on the Monsignor Del Valle Square at the northwest corner of Hunts Point Avenue and Bruckner Boulevard.
Kingsbridge Road	"B" train "D" train	Elevator at northeast corner of Grand Concourse (service road) and East Kingsbridge Road.
Mosholu Parkway	"4" train	Elevator to mezzanine and northbound platform near southeast corner of East Mosholu Parkway North and Jerome Avenue.; Note: The elevator to mezzanine level and southbound platform resides within the fare control area of this station.
Parkchester	"6" train "6" express train	Elevators inside station house at the median of Hugh J. Grant Circle.
Pelham Bay Park	"6" train "6" express train	Elevator at back of station beyond escalators, near corner of Westchester Avenue and Bruckner Boulevard
Pelham Parkway	"2" train "5" train	Elevator at southwest corner of Pelham Parkway and White Plains Road.
Simpson Street	"2" train "5" train	Elevator for northbound service at southwest corner of Simpson Street and Westchester Avenue.; Elevator for southbound service at northeast corner of Simpson Street and Westchester Avenue.
Tremont Avenue	"B" train "D" train	Elevator at southeast corner of Grand Concourse (service road) and Echo Place.
Westchester Square–East Tremont Avenue	"6" train "6" express train	Elevator at northwest corner of Westchester Avenue and Lane Avenue.

==== Brooklyn ====
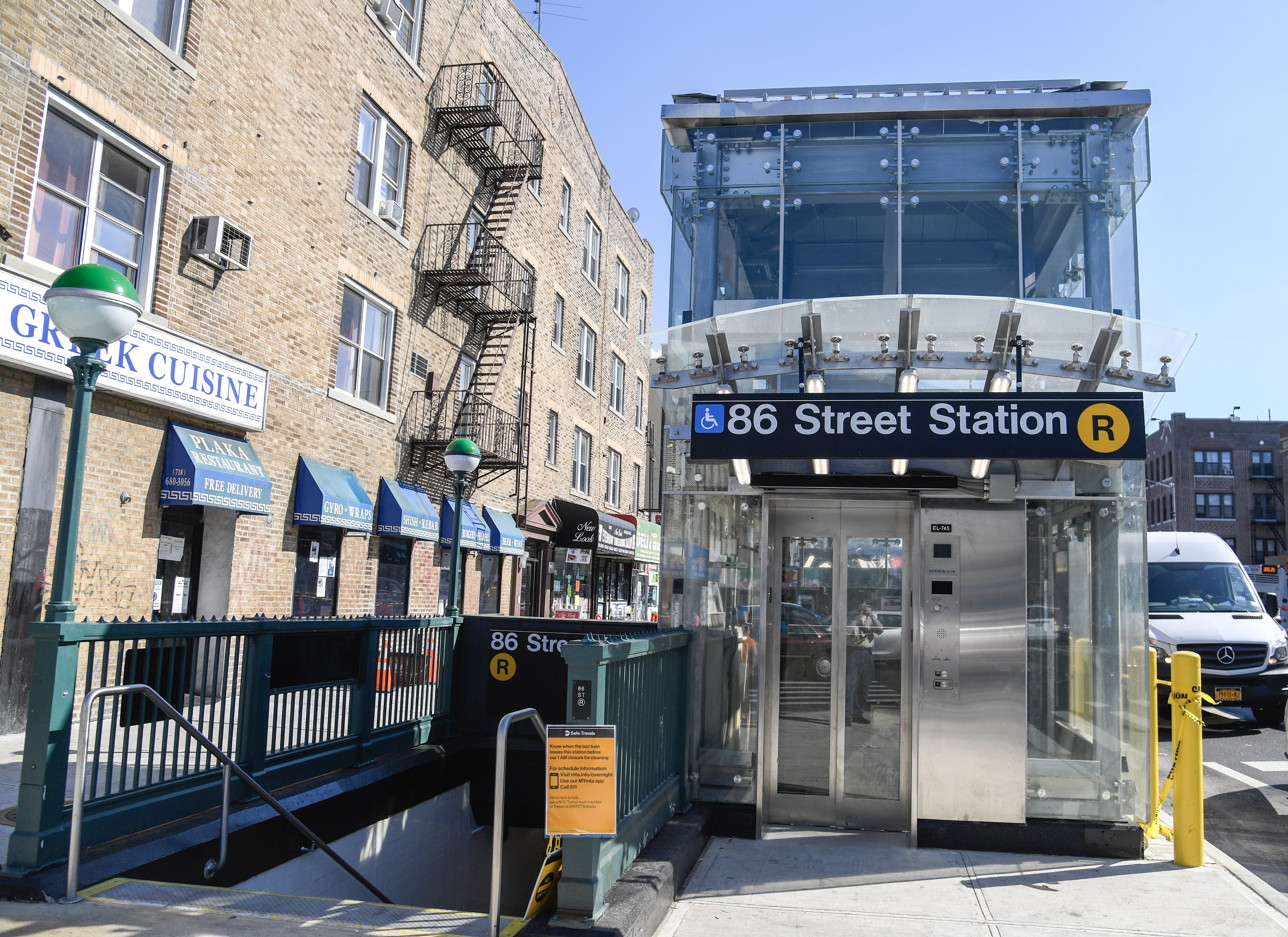
Elevator at the 86th Street station

As of August 2026, there are 46 ADA-compliant stations in Brooklyn out of 170 (27%), or 38 (24%) if stations in complexes are counted as one.

Station	Services	Accessible entrance and notes
59th Street	"N" train "R" train "W" train	Elevator at northwest corner of 59th Street and 4th Avenue.
62nd Street/New Utrecht Avenue	"D" train "R" train "N" train "W" train	Elevators inside station house at southeast corner of 62nd Street and New Utrecht Avenue.
86th Street	"R" train	Elevator at southeast corner of 86th Street and 4th Avenue.
Atlantic Avenue–Barclays Center	"2" train "3" train "4" train "5" train "D" train "N" train "R" train "W" train "B" train "Q" train	Elevator at southeast corner of Pacific Street and Fourth Avenue.; Elevators at Hanson Place and Flatbush Avenue in Atlantic Terminal mall; shared with LIRR station.; Elevator at southeast corner of Atlantic and Flatbush Avenues, adjacent to the Barclays Center.
Avenue H	"Q" train	Ramp for southbound service on north side of Avenue H east of East 15th Street.; Ramp for northbound service on south side of Avenue H west of East 16th Street.
Bay Parkway	"D" train "R" train "W" train	Elevator at northwest corner of Bay Parkway and 86th Street.
Bay Ridge–95th Street	"R" train	Elevator at northwest corner of 95th Street and 4th Avenue.
Bedford Avenue	"L" train	Elevator at northeast corner of Bedford Avenue and North 7th Street.
Borough Hall	"2" train "3" train "4" train "5" train	Elevator in front of Supreme Court Building at Court Street and Montague Street for 2 and 3.; Elevator in front of Brooklyn Borough Hall at Court Street and Joralemon Street for 4 and 5.; Notes: The transfer passageway connecting the northbound 2 and 3 platform and the northbound 4 and 5 platform is ADA-compliant.; The elevators to the N, R, and W platform are not ADA-compliant.
Canarsie–Rockaway Parkway	"L" train	Station at street level.
Church Avenue	"2" train "5" train	Elevator for northbound service at southeast corner of Church Avenue and Nostrand Avenue.; Elevator for southbound service at southwest corner of Church Avenue and Nostrand Avenue.
Church Avenue	"B" train "Q" train	Elevators inside station house on the east side of East 18th Street between Church and Caton Avenues.
Church Avenue	"F" train "F" express train "G" train	Elevator at northwest corner of Church Avenue and McDonald Avenue.
Coney Island–Stillwell Avenue	"D" train "F" train "F" express train "N" train "Q" train	Wheelchair ramps inside station house accessible from the northeast corner of Surf Avenue and Stillwell Avenue and southeast corner of Mermaid Avenue and Stillwell Avenue. Southernmost accessible station in the system.; Notes: Wheelchair ramps inside fare control each stretch out from the mezzanine to the F and <F>, N and Q platforms.; The ramp from the D platform to the mezzanine is not accessible because it is built to a steep grade and leads down to a small staircase; that platform is instead accessed first via a ramp to the N platform and the first of two elevators, each one leading up to an overpass and then via the latter elevator to the D platform.
Crown Heights–Utica Avenue	"2" train "3" train "4" train "5" train	Elevator at northwest corner of Utica Avenue and Eastern Parkway, in Eastern Parkway median.
DeKalb Avenue	"B" train "D" train "N" train "Q" train "R" train "W" train	Elevator at southeast corner of DeKalb Avenue and Flatbush Avenue Extension.
Eastern Parkway–Brooklyn Museum	"2" train "3" train "4" train	Elevator to the south side of Eastern Parkway in front of the Brooklyn Museum
Eighth Avenue	"N" train "W" train	Elevators inside station house at northwest corner of Eighth Avenue and 62nd Street.
Euclid Avenue	"A" train "C" train	Elevator at northeast corner of Euclid and Pitkin Avenues.
Flatbush Avenue–Brooklyn College	"2" train "5" train	Elevator at southeast corner of Flatbush Avenue and Nostrand Avenue.
Flushing Avenue	"J" train "M" train	Elevator at southwest corner of Flushing Avenue and Broadway. Elevator to each platform from station house.
Franklin Avenue	"A" train "C" train Franklin Avenue Shuttle	Elevator at southwest corner of Franklin Avenue and Fulton Street.
Grand Street	"L" train	Elevator for northbound service at northeast corner of Grand Street and Bushwick Avenue.; Elevator for southbound service at northwest corner of Grand Street and Bushwick Avenue.
Greenpoint Avenue	"G" train	Elevator at northeast corner of Greenpoint Avenue and Manhattan Avenue.
Hoyt Street	"2" train "3" train	Elevator near southwest corner of Hoyt Street and Fulton Street. Note: accessible for southbound trains only.
Jay Street–MetroTech	"A" train "C" train "F" train "F" express train "N" train "R" train "W" train	Elevator at northwest corner of Jay and Willoughby Streets, for all train services.
Kings Highway	"B" train "Q" train	Elevators to platforms inside station house on south side of Kings Highway between East 15th and East 16th Streets.
Kings Highway	"F" train "F" express train	Elevator at southeast corner of Kings Highway and McDonald Avenue.
Livonia Avenue	"L" train	Elevator inside station house at northwest corner of Livonia and Van Sinderen Avenues.
Marcy Avenue	"J" train "M" train "Z" train	Elevator for eastbound service at southwest corner of Marcy Avenue and Broadway.; Elevator for westbound service at northwest corner of Marcy Avenue and Broadway.
Metropolitan Avenue/Lorimer Street	"G" train "L" train	Elevator at southeast corner of Union Avenue and Metropolitan Avenue for G trains.; Elevator at northwest corner of Lorimer Street and Metropolitan Avenue for L trains.; Note: The transfer passageway between the G platforms and the L platforms is not ADA-compliant; there is an accessible out-of-system transfer.
Myrtle–Wyckoff Avenues	"L" train "M" train	Elevators inside station house at the triangle formed by Gates, Myrtle, and Wyckoff Avenues.
Park Place	Franklin Avenue Shuttle	Ramp from Prospect Place west of Franklin Avenue; service in both directions on single track.
Prospect Park	"B" train "Q" train Franklin Avenue Shuttle	Entrance ramp on Lincoln Road between Flatbush Avenue and Ocean Avenue; elevators after fare control.
Seventh Avenue	"F" train "F" express train "G" train	Elevator at northwest corner of 7th Avenue and 9th Street.
Sheepshead Bay	"B" train "Q" train	Elevators inside station house on the south side of Sheepshead Bay Road at the southeast corner of East 15th Street.
Utica Avenue	"A" train "C" train	Elevator at northwest corner of Fulton Street and Malcolm X Boulevard.
Wilson Avenue	"L" train	Ramp at dead-end of Wilson Avenue east of Moffat Street. Note: accessible for northbound trains only.

==== Queens ====
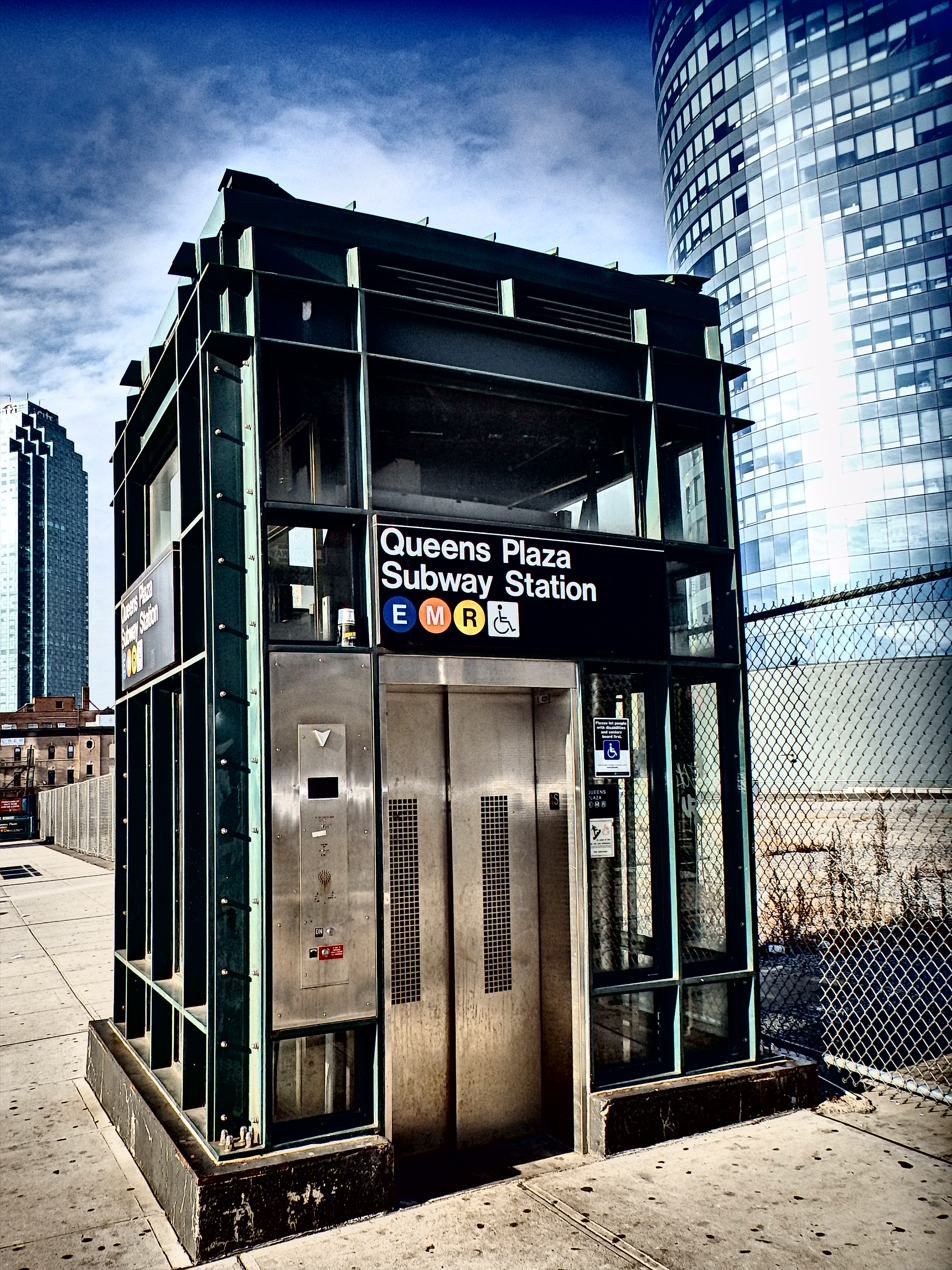
Elevator at the Queens Plaza station

As of June 2026, there are 28 ADA-compliant stations in Queens out of 81 (35%), or 25 (31%) if stations in complexes are counted as one. This count excludes Mets–Willets Point, where the sole ADA-accessible platform is open only during certain events.

Station	Services	Accessible entrance and notes
21st Street–Queensbridge	"F" train "M" train	Elevator at northwest corner of 21st Street and 41st Avenue.
61st Street–Woodside	"7" train "7" express train	Elevator at northeast corner of Roosevelt Avenue and 61st Street; shared with LIRR station.
Aqueduct Racetrack	"A" train	Elevator next to south staircase down to Resorts World Casino Parking Lot.; Alternate wheelchair access via the Sky Bridge entrance to Resorts World New York City.
Astoria Boulevard	"N" train "W" train	Elevators at southeast corner of Hoyt Avenue South and 31st Street, and northwest corner of Hoyt Avenue North and 31st Street.
Beach 67th Street	"A" train	Elevator to mezzanine level and westbound platform at northwest corner of Beach 67th Street and Rockaway Freeway.; Note: The elevator to mezzanine level and eastbound platform resides within the fare control area of this station.
Court Square–23rd Street	"7" train "7" express train "E" train "F" train "F" express train "G" train	Elevator at northeast corner of 23rd Street and Jackson Avenue for the 7 and G trains.; Elevator at northeast corner of 23rd Street and 44th Drive under Skyline Tower for southbound E and F trains.; Notes: The northbound E and F platform is not ADA-compliant.; The passageway between the E and F platforms and the G platform is not ADA-compliant.
Far Rockaway–Mott Avenue	"A" train	Elevators to platform level inside station house at northeast corner of Mott Avenue and Beach 22nd Street.
Flushing–Main Street	"7" train "7" express train	Elevator on Roosevelt Avenue east of Main Street, north side.
Forest Hills–71st Avenue	"E" train "F" train "F" express train "M" train "R" train	Elevator on south side of Queens Boulevard between 70th Road and 71st Avenue.
Howard Beach–JFK Airport	"A" train	Elevators at Coleman Square and 159th Avenue.
Jackson Heights– Roosevelt Avenue/ 74th Street	"7" train "7" express train "E" train "F" train "F" express train "M" train "R" train	Elevator after fare control in station house on Roosevelt Avenue between 74th and 75th Streets, or enter on Broadway between 74th and 75th Streets.
Jamaica–179th Street	"E" train "F" train "F" express train	Elevator at southeast corner of 179th Place and Hillside Avenue.
Jamaica Center–York College	"E" train "J" train "Z" train	Elevator on south side of Archer Avenue at Parsons Boulevard.
Jamaica–Van Wyck	"E" train	Elevator at corner of 89th Avenue and Van Wyck Expressway south service road, adjacent to Jamaica Hospital.
Junction Boulevard	"7" train "7" express train	Elevator at northeast corner of Junction Boulevard and Roosevelt Avenue.
Kew Gardens–Union Turnpike	"E" train "F" train "F" express train	Elevator at southeast corner of Union Turnpike and Kew Gardens Road.
Mets–Willets Point	"7" train "7" express train	Ramp to overpass on south side of Roosevelt Avenue. Note: Only the northbound side-platform is accessible; service at this platform is available only to Main Street-Flushing on Mets baseball game, USTA game, or special events.
Middle Village– Metropolitan Avenue	"M" train	Station at street level.
Northern Boulevard	"M" train "R" train	Elevator for eastbound service at southeast corner of 54th Street and Broadway.; Elevator for westbound service at northeast corner of 56th Street and Broadway.
Ozone Park–Lefferts Boulevard	"A" train	Elevator at northwest corner of Liberty Avenue and Lefferts Boulevard.
Queens Plaza	"E" train "F" train "F" express train "R" train	Elevator at southwest corner of Queens Plaza South and Jackson Avenue.
Queensboro Plaza	"7" train "7" express train "N" train "W" train	Elevators at southeast corner of Queens Plaza South and Crescent Street, and northwest corner of Queens Plaza North and 27th Street.
Rockaway Boulevard	"A" train	Elevator to mezzanine level and westbound platform at the median of Woodhaven Boulevard and 94th Street on the north side of Liberty Avenue.; Note: The elevator to mezzanine level and eastbound platform resides within the fare control area of this station.
Rockaway Park–Beach 116th Street	"A" train Rockaway Park Shuttle	Station at street level.
Sutphin Boulevard–Archer Avenue–JFK Airport	"E" train "J" train "Z" train	Trio of elevators off southwest corner of Sutphin Boulevard and Archer Avenue near elevated LIRR tracks; shared with Jamaica LIRR and AirTrain JFK stations.
Woodhaven Boulevard	"J" train "Z" train	Elevator for southbound service at northeast corner of Woodhaven Boulevard (service road) and Jamaica Avenue.; Elevator for northbound service at southeast corner of Woodhaven Boulevard (service road) and Jamaica Avenue.

=== Staten Island Railway ===
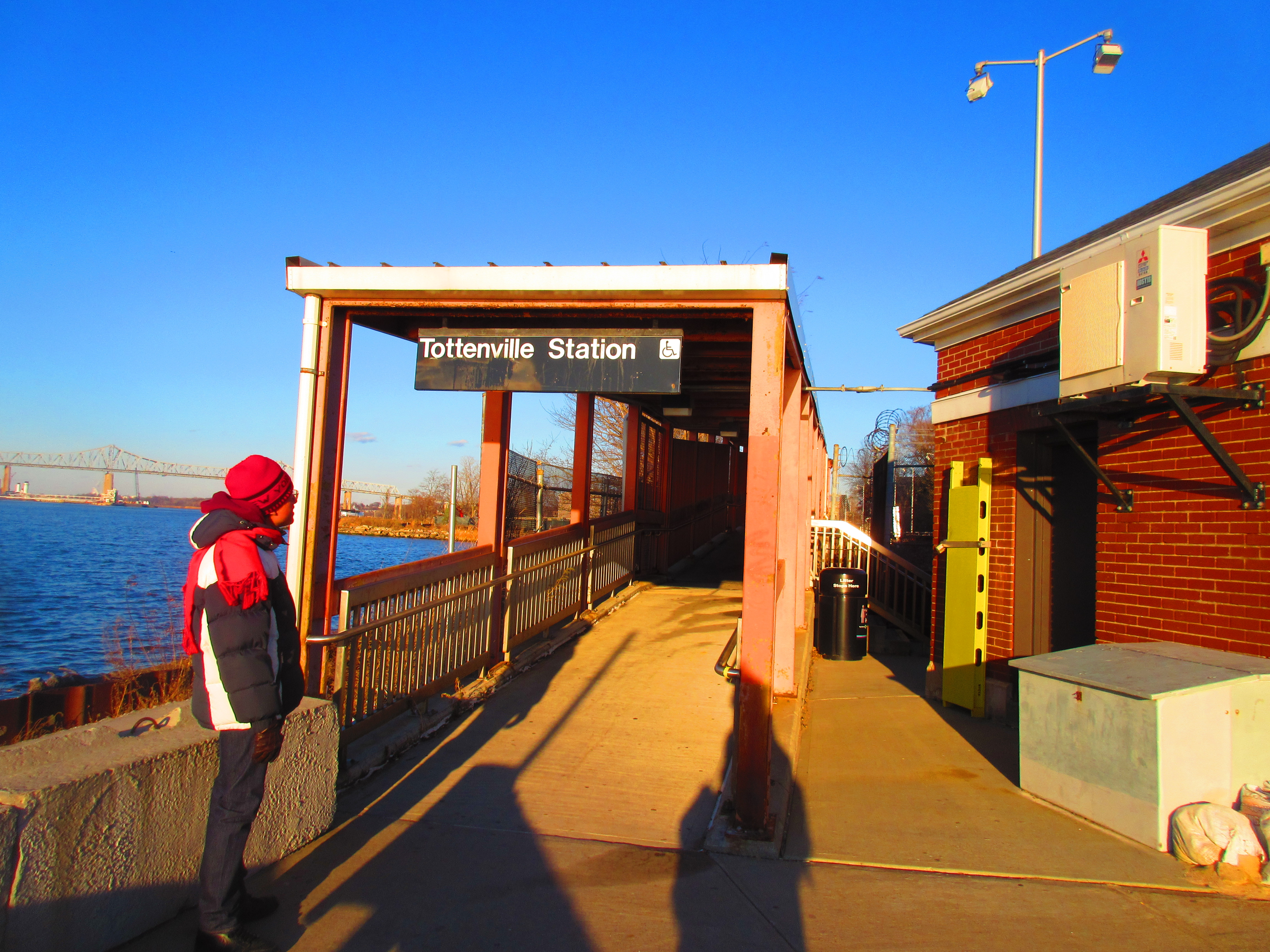
A ramp at the Tottenville station

As of September 2023, there are six ADA-accessible stations on the Staten Island Railway out of 21 (29%). Stations built after 1990 are marked with an asterisk (*).

Station	Accessible entrance and notes
St. George	North side elevator for bus, taxi, ferry or railway levels.; South side elevator for passenger drop-off, or ferry levels.
Dongan Hills	Ramps on both sides of the station.
New Dorp	Northbound elevator at southwest corner of New Dorp Lane and New Dorp Plaza South.; Southbound elevator at southeast corner of New Dorp Lane and New Dorp Plaza North.
Great Kills	Ramps on both sides of the station.
Arthur Kill*	Ramps on both sides of the station.
Tottenville	Ramp at south end of the station.

== Commuter rail ==
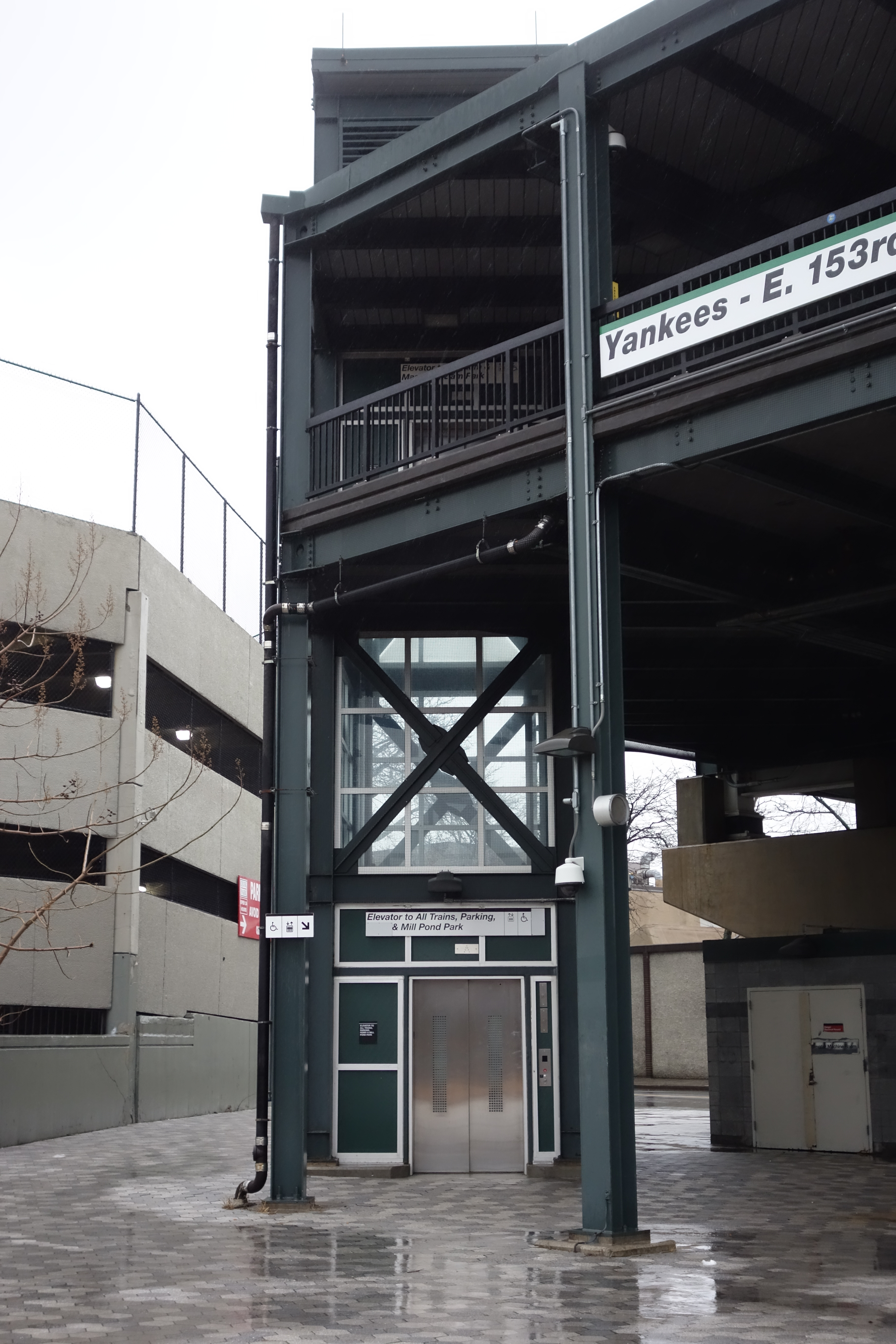
Elevator at the Yankees–East 153rd Street station

As of September 2018, 185 out of the 248 stations (75%) in the entire MTA commuter rail system are accessible by wheelchair. Many of them are ground or grade-level stations, thus requiring little modification to accessibility. A few stations, including the entire Babylon Branch, are elevated or on embankments, but some have been renovated or retrofitted with elevators to meet ADA standards. 57% of the accessible stations in the MTA's railroad system are Long Island Rail Road stations.

During the late 1990s, the LIRR began converting much of its low-floor, at-grade stations into high-floor platforms. Rather than renovate to meet ADA standards, ten low-floor stations, including the surviving five on the Lower Montauk Branch were closed in March 1998, due to low patronage, and incompatibility with then-new C3 bi-level coach cars that can only use high platforms. Five of the LIRR's branches are entirely accessible from east of Jamaica: the Long Beach Branch, Montauk Branch, Oyster Bay Branch, Port Jefferson Branch, and Ronkonkoma Branch.

In January 2020, as part of the 2020–2024 Capital Plan, the MTA announced the three additional Metro-North stations to receive elevators. Forest Hills on the LIRR will also receive elevators as part of the 2020–2024 Capital Plan, as the ramps installed at the station in 1997 are not ADA-compliant.

=== Long Island Rail Road ===
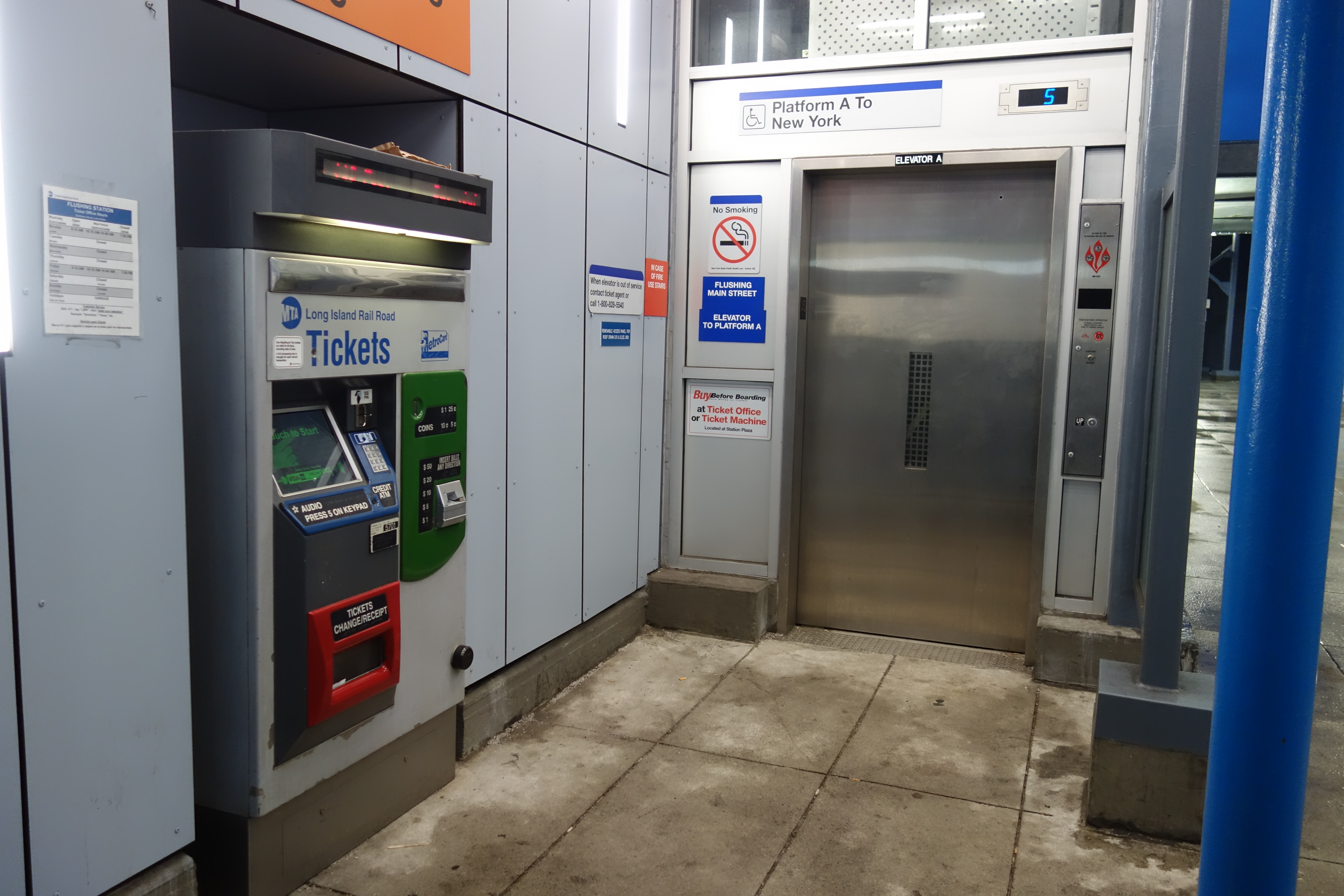
An elevator at the Flushing–Main Street station

As of July 2026, 117 of the 126 LIRR stations (93%) are accessible by wheelchair ramp and/or elevator. Stations that meet full ADA requirements are marked with an asterisk (*). (Other stations are wheelchair accessible but may be missing some ADA features). Stations built after 1990 are marked with a double asterisk (**).

- Albertson
- Amagansett
- Amityville
- Atlantic Terminal*
- Auburndale
- Babylon*
- Baldwin
- Bay Shore
- Bayside
- Bellmore
- Bellport
- Bethpage
- Brentwood
- Bridgehampton
- Broadway
- Carle Place
- Cedarhurst
- Central Islip
- Centre Avenue
- Copiague
- Country Life Press
- Deer Park
- Douglaston
- East Hampton
- East Rockaway
- East Williston
- Elmont**
- Far Rockaway
- Farmingdale
- Floral Park
- Flushing–Main Street
- Forest Hills
- Freeport
- Garden City
- Gibson
- Glen Cove
- Glen Head
- Glen Street
- Grand Central Madison**
- Great Neck*
- Great River
- Greenlawn
- Greenport
- Greenvale
- Hampton Bays
- Hempstead*
- Hempstead Gardens
- Hewlett
- Hicksville*
- Huntington
- Inwood
- Island Park
- Islip
- Jamaica*
- Kew Gardens
- Kings Park
- Lakeview
- Laurelton
- Lawrence
- Lindenhurst*
- Little Neck
- Locust Manor
- Locust Valley
- Long Beach*
- Long Island City
- Lynbrook*
- Malverne
- Manhasset
- Massapequa
- Massapequa Park*
- Mastic–Shirley
- Mattituck
- Medford
- Merillon Avenue
- Merrick
- Mineola*
- Montauk
- Murray Hill*
- Nassau Boulevard
- New Hyde Park
- Northport*
- Nostrand Avenue*
- Oakdale
- Oceanside
- Oyster Bay
- Patchogue*
- Penn Station*
- Pinelawn
- Plandome
- Port Jefferson*
- Port Washington*
- Queens Village*
- Riverhead
- Rockville Centre*
- Ronkonkoma*
- Rosedale
- Roslyn
- Sayville
- Sea Cliff
- Seaford
- Smithtown
- Southampton
- Southold
- Speonk
- St. Albans*
- St. James
- Stewart Manor
- Stony Brook
- Syosset
- Valley Stream
- West Hempstead
- Westbury
- Westhampton
- Westwood
- Woodmere
- Woodside*
- Wyandanch
- Yaphank–BNL**

=== Metro-North Railroad ===
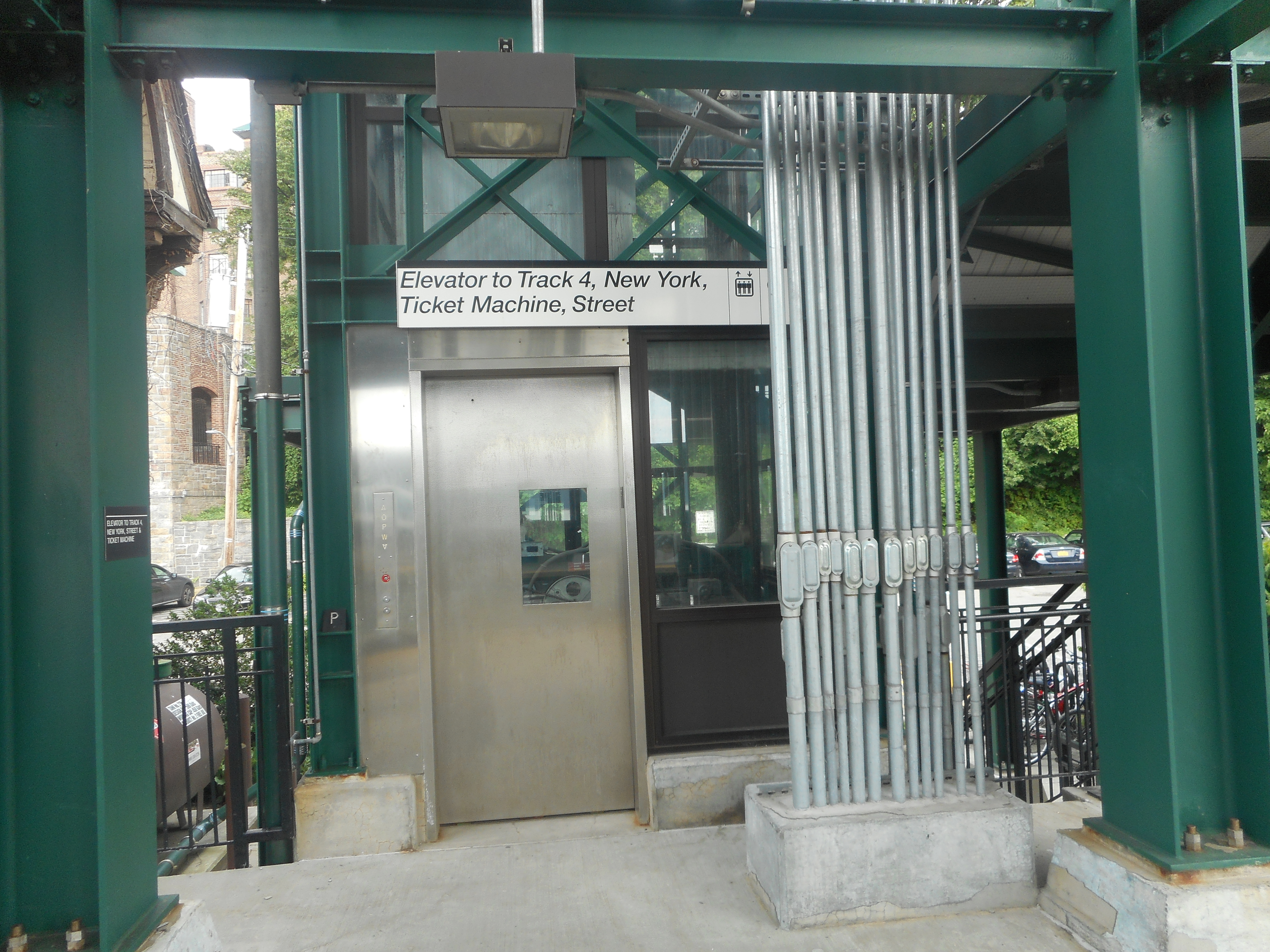
Elevator at the Ardsley-on-Hudson station

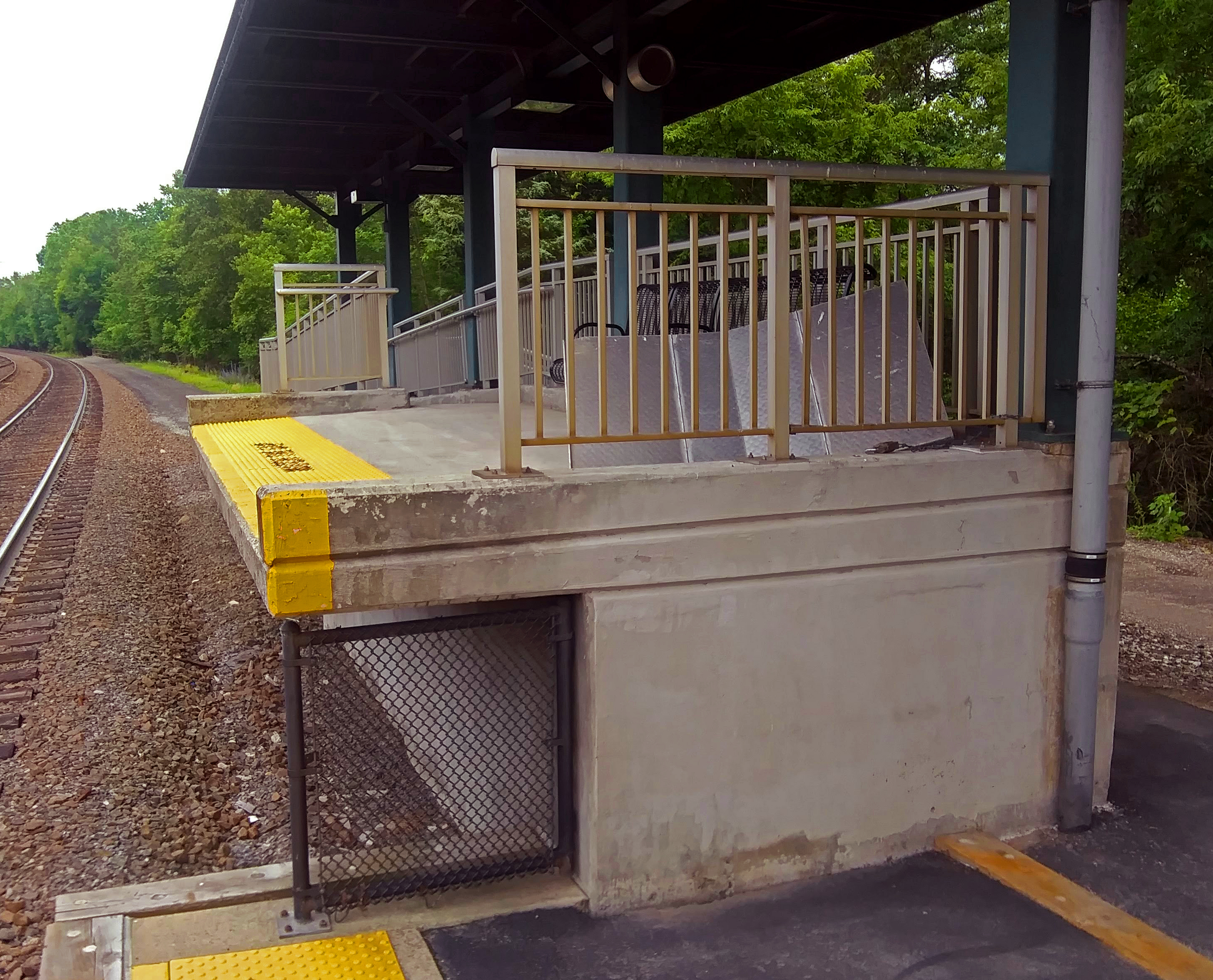
Wheelchair accessibility platform at Campbell Hall station

As of January 2018, 79 of the 124 Metro-North stations (64%) are accessible by wheelchair ramp and/or elevator. Stations that meet full ADA requirements are marked with an asterisk (*). (Other stations are wheelchair accessible but may be missing some ADA features). Stations built after 1990 are marked with a double asterisk (**).

- Ardsley-on-Hudson*
- Beacon
- Bedford Hills
- Bethel**
- Botanical Garden*
- Branchville
- Brewster*
- Bridgeport*
- Bronxville
- Campbell Hall
- Cannondale
- Chappaqua
- Cold Spring
- Cortlandt**
- Crestwood
- Croton Falls
- Croton–Harmon*
- Danbury**
- Darien*
- Dobbs Ferry*
- Dover Plains*
- Fairfield–Black Rock**
- Fleetwood
- Fordham*
- Garrison
- Glenwood*
- Goldens Bridge
- Grand Central Terminal*
- Greenwich*
- Greystone*
- Harlem–125th Street*
- Harlem Valley–Wingdale*
- Harriman*
- Harrison*
- Hartsdale*
- Hastings-on-Hudson*
- Hawthorne
- Irvington
- Katonah
- Larchmont*
- Ludlow (northbound service only)
- Melrose (northbound service only)
- Middletown–Town of Wallkill
- Morris Heights*
- Mount Kisco
- Mount Vernon East*
- Mount Vernon West
- Nanuet*
- New Canaan*
- New Haven*
- New Haven State Street**
- New Rochelle*
- North White Plains
- Ossining
- Patterson*
- Pawling*
- Peekskill
- Pleasantville
- Port Chester*
- Port Jervis*
- Poughkeepsie*
- Purdy's*
- Redding*
- Riverdale*
- Rye*
- Salisbury Mills–Cornwall
- Scarborough
- Scarsdale*
- South Norwalk**
- Southeast
- Spring Valley
- Spuyten Duyvil (northbound service only)
- Stamford*
- Tarrytown
- Tenmile River**
- University Heights*
- Wassaic**
- Waterbury*
- West Haven**
- Westport
- White Plains*
- Yankees–East 153rd Street**
- Yonkers*

== Buses ==
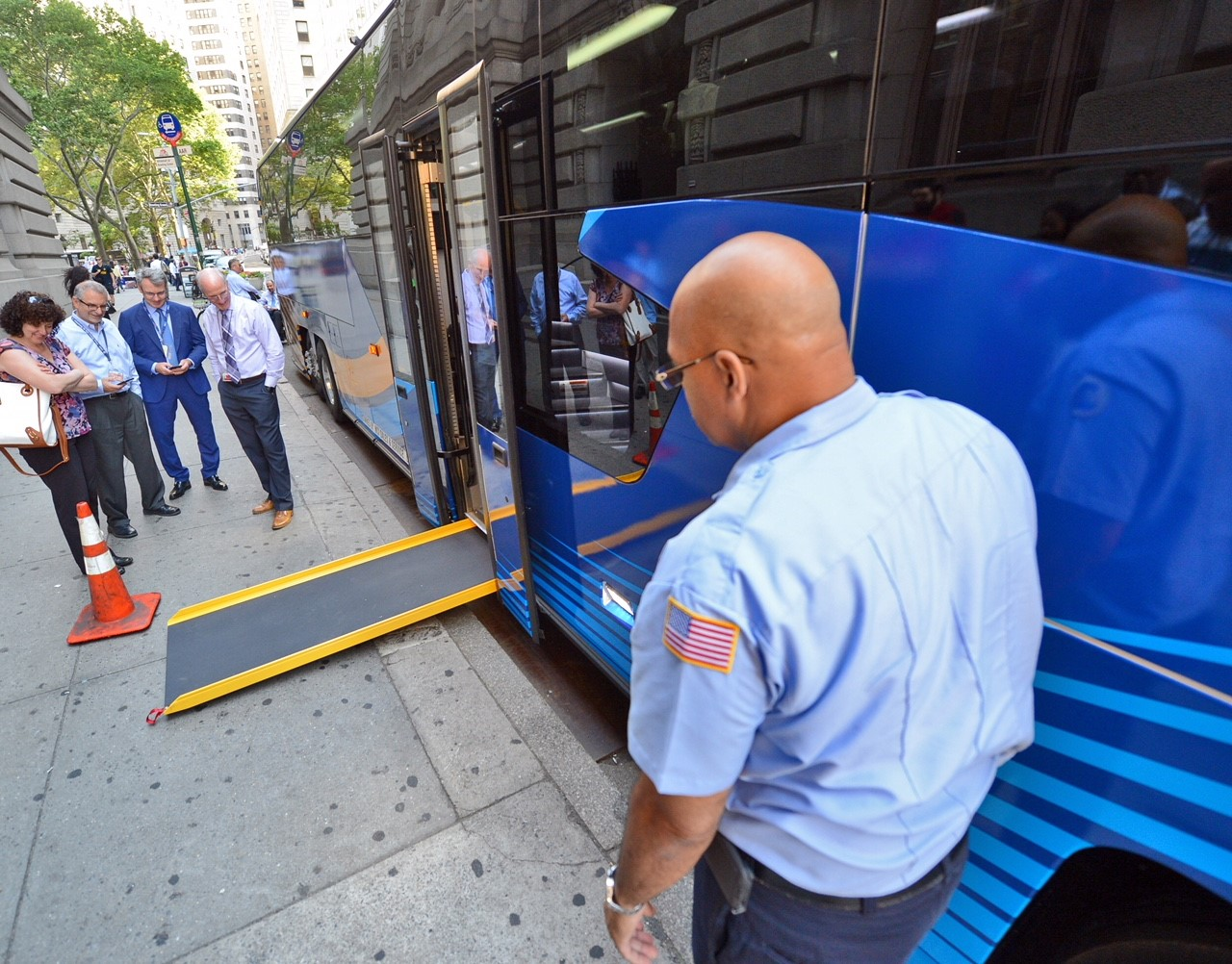
Ramp on an MTA bus

All MTA buses and routes are wheelchair accessible, since all current fleet were built and entered service in the 2000s or later, after the passing of the Americans with Disabilities Act of 1990. As of May 2019, all of the local-bus fleet consists of semi-low floors with wheelchair ramps, while all express buses have high floors and contain lifts.

Many retired fleet are high-level buses, and many of the fleet built before 1990 do not comply with ADA standards. The federal government started requiring that half of all MTA buses be accessible in 1981. However, the wheelchair lifts on the earliest wheelchair-accessible buses were unreliable. By 1983, less than a third of the 3,600-vehicle MTA fleet were accessible, and it was impossible to tell which routes had accessible buses because they were dispatched randomly. Drivers sometimes refused to pick up disabled passengers, or they did not carry keys for lift-equipped buses, or the lifts were operated improperly. As part of a disability-lawsuit agreement in June 1984, Governor Mario Cuomo agreed to equip 65% of MTA buses with wheelchair lifts.

The number of disabled riders on MTA buses rose eleven-fold between 1986 and 1991. By 1991, a year after the ADA law was passed, the bus system saw 120,000 disabled passengers per year. Ninety percent of the fleet was wheelchair-accessible, compared to other cities' transit systems, which had much lower percentages of accessible buses in their fleets. The last non-accessible vehicle in the MTA New York City Bus fleet, excluding routes that later became part of the MTA Bus Company, was retired in 1993. In 1997, the first low-floor bus in the city was tested; these buses have ramps rather than a wheelchair lift, with a significantly lower step to the curb. Low-floor buses have made up most of the new non-express buses ordered since the early 2000s, with the last non-express high-floor bus withdrawn in 2019.

Express routes use a fleet of high-floor coach buses, which have more intricate lifts than low-floor buses used on non-express routes. A 2025 report by Comptroller Brad Lander found that disabled riders tended to avoid express routes for numerous reasons. For example, the express bus operators were unfamiliar with operating the buses' lifts, and the lifts themselves often broke down.

In calendar year 2019, the MTA recorded over 1.5 million bus customers who used wheelchair ramps or lifts. All MTA Bus operators are required to have ADA training. The newest buses have hands-free intercom systems for drivers. In 2026, the MTA announced plans to more extensively train express-bus drivers how to use the buses' hydraulic lifts.

=== Access-A-Ride ===

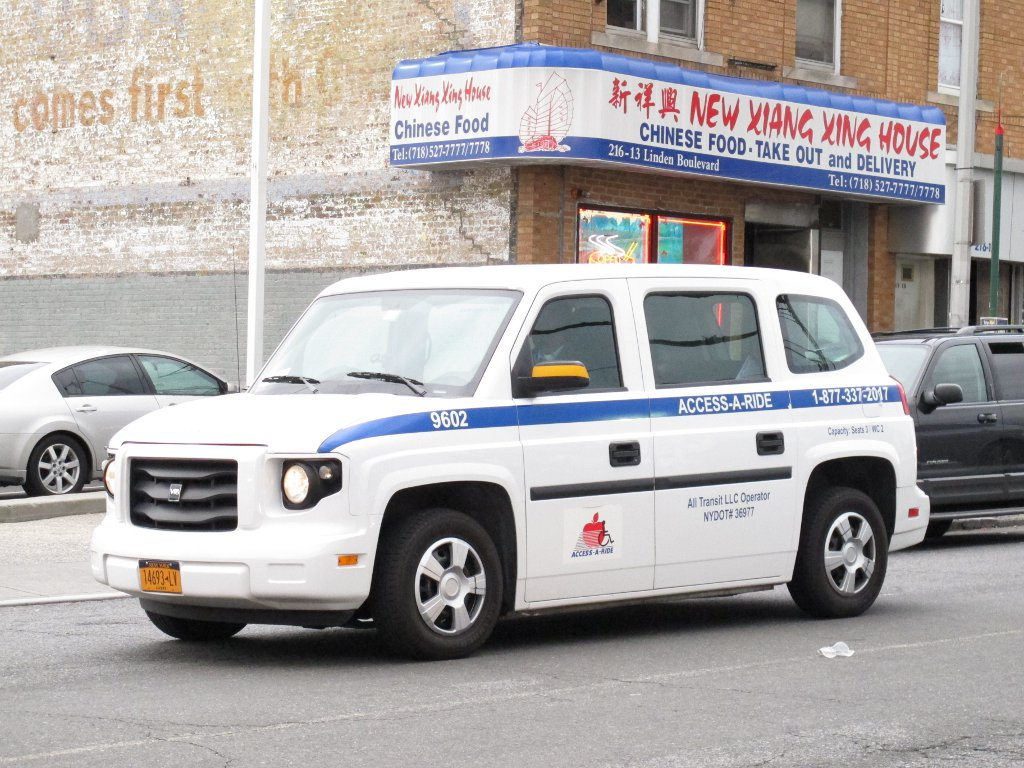
An MV-1 Access-A-Ride cab

The New York City Transit Authority also operates paratransit services branded as Access-A-Ride (AAR) for disabled customers who cannot use regular bus or subway service in New York City, and nearby areas in Nassau and Westchester counties, within MTA's three-quarter mile service area. AAR is available at all times. In addition, AAR has dedicated pickup locations around the city. Passengers are charged the same $3.00 fare on AAR as on regular transit.

The paratransit system began as a $5 million pilot program following the passage of the ADA law. The services are contracted to private companies. In 1993, because many disabled riders were being refused service in violation of the ADA, the MTA announced an expansion of the program. The service was carrying 300,000 yearly riders back then. In 1998, in response to a discrimination lawsuit, the Access-A-Ride program underwent another expansion. At the time, despite having 1 million annual customers the program only had 300 vehicles and Access-A-Ride journeys often took several hours, while only twenty-six subway stations were ADA-accessible.

Several private contractors operate the Access-A-Ride vehicles for the MTA. The paratransit system has come under scrutiny by the media for being unwieldy: rides must be booked 24 to 48 hours in advance; it is costly to operate; and vehicles often show up late or fail to show up at all. Rides for any given day also had to be reserved before 5 p.m. the following day, a deadline accessibility advocates criticized as excessively early. AAR vehicles were defined as being "on time" when they arrived within 30 minutes of the scheduled time, and in 2017, two pilot programs were implemented to speed up AAR service. Multiple customers can share AAR vehicles, although shared AAR trips were suspended from March 2020 to July 2021 due to the COVID-19 pandemic. The program's operating cost was $461 million per year as of 2015, which is relatively high considering that only 150,000 people use it every year.

Howard Roberts, a former high-ranking MTA official, was quoted as saying that "it probably has turned out to be … a hundred times more expensive to go with buses and paratransit than it would have been to bite the bullet and simply rehabilitate the stations and put elevators in." The Access-A-Ride service competes with options such as accessible taxis, although accessible taxis only make up a small percentage of the city's entire taxi fleet. As part of the 2018 MTA Action Plan, the MTA would improve the Access-A-Ride interface to make the ride-hailing, vehicle scheduling, and traveling processes easier. During the COVID-19 pandemic, there was an increase in the reports of AAR trips that were canceled, in part because of traffic congestion and a shortage of drivers. AAR bought its first electric vans in 2024; at the time, the AAR fleet had 1,100 vehicles. As of 2024, AAR averages 30,000 daily customers on weekdays.

== Pilot programs and other assistance ==
In October 2019, the MTA unveiled an accessible station lab at the Jay Street–MetroTech subway station, which included Braille signs, tactile pads, wayfinding apps, diagrams of accessible routes, and floor stickers to guide passengers to subway routes. The MTA also added a hearing induction loop to the Bowling Green station, the first such installation in the subway system, during a pilot program in early 2020.

The MTA released the NaviLens and NaviLens Go apps as part of another pilot program in late 2020. The apps could scan QR codes at bus stops and read out signs and bus-arrival times. To assist visually impaired riders and those with limited English proficiency, the MTA began adding colorful QR codes outside selected subway stations in early 2024. These codes could be scanned using the NaviLens and NaviLens Go apps, which display train-arrival times and translate signs into 34 languages. Initially, the NaviLens codes were present only at M66 bus stops and selected subway stations on the 1, 2, and 3 routes, as well as at some M23 bus stops. In 2023, the MTA received a federal grant to expand the program to the 6 subway route and the Bx12 bus route.

In September 2022, designated stroller-parking spaces were added to 100 MTA buses as part of a pilot program, allowing parents and guardians to keep their strollers open on the bus; previously, passengers had to fold all strollers before boarding the bus. Despite concerns from accessibility advocates, who feared that the strollers would pose a hazard, the program was expanded in 2023 to over 1,000 buses.

The New York City Department of Education's special education district runs a travel training program, teaching navigation of the city's subways and buses.

== Future accessible stations ==
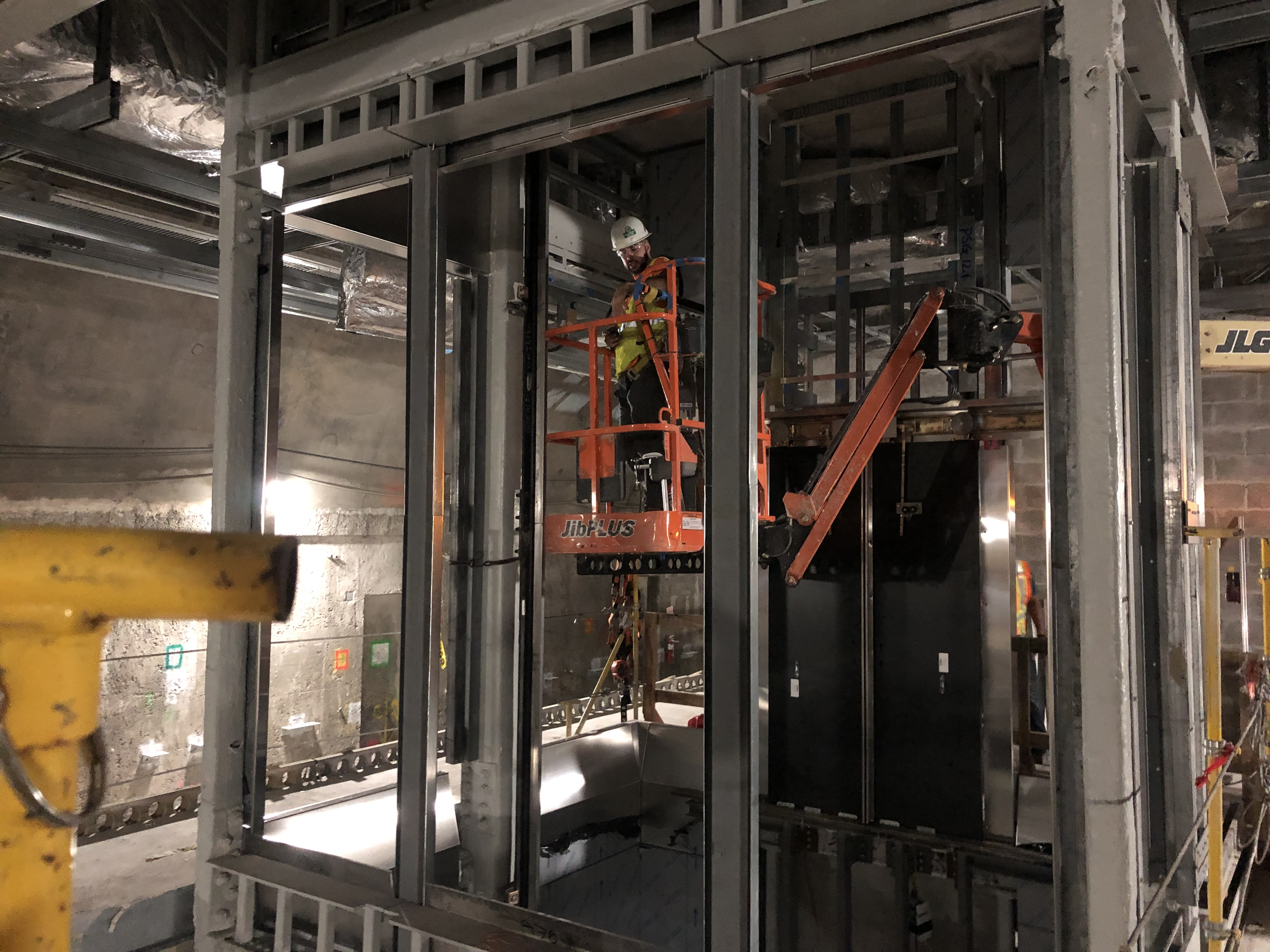
Elevator under construction at Grand Central Madison

There were several "station groupings" that were proposed by the MTA in February 2019. At least one station in each grouping is slated to receive ADA improvements. In total, 24 groupings were proposed: three each in Queens and Staten Island, four each in the Bronx and Manhattan, and 10 in Brooklyn. An internal MTA list in July 2019 narrowed down these choices. These stations were included in the list of 48 stations that were confirmed as being under consideration for ADA-accessibility in an announcement in September 2019.

As of October 2026, numerous stations across the MTA system are slated to receive ADA renovations. Those projects are in various stages of planning, design, or construction. The following listing excludes stations that are already accessible but will receive ADA renovations anyway, including Forest Hills on the LIRR Main Line in Queens.

Station	Current service	Location	Status (Note: The following notations apply to this table: Renovation in progress: Station is currently undergoing renovations to put it in compliance with ADA standards; Under construction: Station is currently being built; all new stations must be compliant with ADA standards; Contract awarded: Station will undergo renovations, and has contract for renovations awarded; Construction pending (ZFA): Station will undergo renovations, funded by a private developer, as part of the Zoning for Accessibility program; Proposed station: New station proposed to be built on existing lines; Contract award pending: Station will undergo renovations to put it in compliance with ADA standards once a contract for these renovations has been awarded; In planning: Station is currently being planned to receive ADA improvements; In pre-planning: Station has tentatively been identified as a candidate to receive ADA improvements)	Notes/refs.
Junius Street	"3" train "4" train	Brooklyn	Renovation in progress	"Package 3" bundle awarded in December 2022.
Steinway Street	"M" train "R" train	Queens	Renovation in progress	"Package 3" bundle awarded in December 2022.
Woodhaven Boulevard	"M" train "R" train	Queens	Renovation in progress	"Package 3" bundle awarded in December 2022.
Broadway Junction	"A" train "C" train "J" train "L" train "Z" train	Brooklyn	Renovation in progress	MTA "City Station" candidate
Van Cortlandt Park-242 St	"1" train	The Bronx	Renovation in progress	"Package 5" bundle awarded in December 2023: Northbound platform only for Court Square–23rd Street; southbound platform already accessible.; Northbound express platform and southbound platforms only at 86th Street; northbound local platform already accessible.
New Lots Avenue	"3" train	Brooklyn	Renovation in progress	"Package 5" bundle awarded in December 2023: Northbound platform only for Court Square–23rd Street; southbound platform already accessible.; Northbound express platform and southbound platforms only at 86th Street; northbound local platform already accessible.
86th Street	"4" train "5" train "6" train "6" express train	Manhattan	Renovation in progress	"Package 5" bundle awarded in December 2023: Northbound platform only for Court Square–23rd Street; southbound platform already accessible.; Northbound express platform and southbound platforms only at 86th Street; northbound local platform already accessible.
33rd Street–Rawson Street	"7" train	Queens	Renovation in progress	"Package 5" bundle awarded in December 2023: Northbound platform only for Court Square–23rd Street; southbound platform already accessible.; Northbound express platform and southbound platforms only at 86th Street; northbound local platform already accessible.
46th Street–Bliss Street	"7" train	Queens	Renovation in progress	"Package 5" bundle awarded in December 2023: Northbound platform only for Court Square–23rd Street; southbound platform already accessible.; Northbound express platform and southbound platforms only at 86th Street; northbound local platform already accessible.
81st Street–Museum of Natural History	"B" train "C" train	Manhattan	Renovation in progress	"Package 5" bundle awarded in December 2023: Northbound platform only for Court Square–23rd Street; southbound platform already accessible.; Northbound express platform and southbound platforms only at 86th Street; northbound local platform already accessible.
96th Street	"B" train "C" train	Manhattan	Renovation in progress	"Package 5" bundle awarded in December 2023: Northbound platform only for Court Square–23rd Street; southbound platform already accessible.; Northbound express platform and southbound platforms only at 86th Street; northbound local platform already accessible.
36th Street	"D" train "N" train "R" train	Brooklyn	Renovation in progress	"Package 5" bundle awarded in December 2023: Northbound platform only for Court Square–23rd Street; southbound platform already accessible.; Northbound express platform and southbound platforms only at 86th Street; northbound local platform already accessible.
Court Square–23rd Street	"E" train "F" train "F" express train	Queens	Renovation in progress	"Package 5" bundle awarded in December 2023: Northbound platform only for Court Square–23rd Street; southbound platform already accessible.; Northbound express platform and southbound platforms only at 86th Street; northbound local platform already accessible.
Classon Avenue	"G" train	Brooklyn	Renovation in progress	"Package 5" bundle awarded in December 2023: Northbound platform only for Court Square–23rd Street; southbound platform already accessible.; Northbound express platform and southbound platforms only at 86th Street; northbound local platform already accessible.
Broadway	"N" train "W" train	Queens	Renovation in progress	"Package 5" bundle awarded in December 2023: Northbound platform only for Court Square–23rd Street; southbound platform already accessible.; Northbound express platform and southbound platforms only at 86th Street; northbound local platform already accessible.
Huguenot	Staten Island Railway	Staten Island	Renovation in progress	"Package 5" bundle awarded in December 2023: Northbound platform only for Court Square–23rd Street; southbound platform already accessible.; Northbound express platform and southbound platforms only at 86th Street; northbound local platform already accessible.
Williams Bridge	MNRR: Harlem Line	The Bronx	Renovation in progress	
Woodlawn	MNRR: Harlem Line	The Bronx	Renovation in progress	
Ludlow	MNRR: Hudson Line	Westchester County	Renovation in progress	
Hollis	LIRR: Main Line	Queens	Renovation in progress	
Burnside Avenue	"4" train	The Bronx	Renovation in progress	"Package 6" bundle awarded in December 2024.
Middletown Road	"6" train "6" express train	The Bronx	Renovation in progress	"Package 6" bundle awarded in December 2024.
Avenue I	"F" train "F" express train	Brooklyn	Renovation in progress	"Package 6" bundle awarded in December 2024.
Myrtle Avenue	"J" train "M" train "Z" train	Brooklyn	Renovation in progress	"Package 6" bundle awarded in December 2024.
Norwood Avenue	"J" train "Z" train	Brooklyn	Renovation in progress	"Package 6" bundle awarded in December 2024.
Kingsbridge Road	"4" train	The Bronx	Renovation in progress	"Package 7" bundle awarded in September 2025.
167th Street	"B" train "D" train	The Bronx	Renovation in progress	"Package 7" bundle awarded in September 2025.
Briarwood	"E" train "F" train "F" express train	Queens	Renovation in progress	"Package 9" bundle awarded in December 2025.
Parsons Boulevard	"F" train "F" express train	Queens	Renovation in progress	"Package 9" bundle awarded in December 2025.
Gates Avenue	"J" train "Z" train	Brooklyn	Renovation in progress	"Package 9" bundle awarded in December 2025.
42nd Street–Bryant Park/Fifth Avenue	"7" train "7" express train "B" train "D" train "F" train "F" express train "M" train	Manhattan	Renovation in progress	
Third Avenue-138 Street	"6" train "6" express train	The Bronx	Renovation in progress	
Brook Avenue	"6" train	The Bronx	Renovation in progress	
Bellerose	LIRR: Main Line	Queens	Renovation in progress	
Wakefield–241st Street	"2" train	The Bronx	Contract awarded	"Package 11" bundle awarded in November 2026.
110th Street	"6" train "6" express train	Manhattan	Contract awarded	"Package 11" bundle awarded in November 2026.
145th Street	"A" train "B" train "C" train "D" train	Manhattan	Contract awarded	"Package 11" bundle awarded in November 2026.
Nostrand Avenue	"A" train "C" train	Brooklyn	Contract award pending	"Package 8" bundle awaiting awarding.
18th Avenue	"D" train	Brooklyn	Contract award pending	"Package 8" bundle awaiting awarding.
Fort Hamilton Parkway	"D" train	Brooklyn	Contract award pending	"Package 8" bundle awaiting awarding.
Neptune Avenue	"F" train "F" express train	Brooklyn	Contract award pending	"Package 8" bundle awaiting awarding.
Jefferson Street	"L" train	Brooklyn	Contract award pending	"Package 8" bundle awaiting awarding.
Morrison Avenue–Soundview	"6" train	The Bronx	Contract award pending	"Package 10" bundle awaiting awarding.
Seventh Avenue	"B" train "D" train "E" train	Manhattan	Contract award pending	"Package 10" bundle awaiting awarding.
Second Avenue	"F" train "F" express train	Manhattan	Contract award pending	"Package 10" bundle awaiting awarding.
Forest Avenue	"M" train	Queens	In planning	Noted as "Package 12" bundle.: Uptown platform only for Spring Street; downtown platform already accessible.; Southbound platform only for Wilson Avenue; Manhattan-bound platform already accessible.
88th Street	"A" train	Queens	In planning	Noted as "Package 12" bundle.: Uptown platform only for Spring Street; downtown platform already accessible.; Southbound platform only for Wilson Avenue; Manhattan-bound platform already accessible.
Van Siclen Avenue	"C" train	Brooklyn	In planning	Noted as "Package 12" bundle.: Uptown platform only for Spring Street; downtown platform already accessible.; Southbound platform only for Wilson Avenue; Manhattan-bound platform already accessible.
Avenue N	"F" train "F" express train	Brooklyn	In planning	Noted as "Package 12" bundle.: Uptown platform only for Spring Street; downtown platform already accessible.; Southbound platform only for Wilson Avenue; Manhattan-bound platform already accessible.
Wilson Avenue	"L" train	Brooklyn	In planning	Noted as "Package 12" bundle.: Uptown platform only for Spring Street; downtown platform already accessible.; Southbound platform only for Wilson Avenue; Manhattan-bound platform already accessible.
207th Street	"1" train	Manhattan	In planning	Noted as "Package 12" bundle.: Uptown platform only for Spring Street; downtown platform already accessible.; Southbound platform only for Wilson Avenue; Manhattan-bound platform already accessible.
Spring Street	"C" train "E" train	Manhattan	In planning	Noted as "Package 12" bundle.: Uptown platform only for Spring Street; downtown platform already accessible.; Southbound platform only for Wilson Avenue; Manhattan-bound platform already accessible.
Delancey Street/Essex Street	"F" train "F" express train "J" train "M" train "Z" train	Manhattan	In planning	
23rd Street	"1" train	Manhattan	In planning	Targeted to begin in 2027.
23rd Street	"C" train "E" train	Manhattan	In planning	Targeted to begin in 2028.
Hoyt–Schermerhorn Streets	"A" train "C" train "G" train	Brooklyn	In planning	
Clifton	Staten Island Railway	Staten Island	In planning	
Lexington Avenue/59th Street	"4" train "5" train "6" train "6" express train "N" train "R" train "W" train	Manhattan	In planning	
125th Street	"1" train	Manhattan	In planning	Targeted to begin in 2028, partially funded by Columbia University
168th Street (Note: The 168th Street station already has elevators between a lower and upper mezzanine, but none to either of the IRT platforms. There is also an elevator between ground level and the upper mezzanine, serving the IND platforms, which are fully accessible.)	"1" train	Manhattan	In planning	In Washington Heights/Inwood station grouping
5th Avenue/53rd Street	"E" train "F" train "F" express train	Manhattan	Construction pending (ZFA)	To be constructed by developer of 570 Fifth Avenue.
50th Street	"1" train	Manhattan	Construction pending (ZFA)	Funded by Extell Development; Construction planned to begin in April 2027
Fifth Avenue–59th Street	"N" train "R" train "W" train	Manhattan	Construction pending (ZFA)	Downtown platform only Funded by Related Companies; Construction planned to begin in "early 2027"
Co-op City	MNRR: New Haven Line	The Bronx	Under construction	Being built as part of the Penn Station Access project
Hunts Point	MNRR: New Haven Line	The Bronx	Under construction	Being built as part of the Penn Station Access project
Morris Park	MNRR: New Haven Line	The Bronx	Under construction	Being built as part of the Penn Station Access project
Parkchester/Van Nest	MNRR: New Haven Line	The Bronx	Under construction	Being built as part of the Penn Station Access project
106th Street	"Q" train	Manhattan	Under construction	Being built as part of phase 2 of the Second Avenue Subway
116th Street	"Q" train	Manhattan	Under construction	Being built as part of phase 2 of the Second Avenue Subway
125th Street	"Q" train	Manhattan	Under construction	Being built as part of phase 2 of the Second Avenue Subway
Astoria–Ditmars Boulevard	"N" train "W" train	Queens	In pre-planning	Planned by the Port Authority of New York and New Jersey as part of planned improvements in bus service to LaGuardia Airport
Hunterspoint Avenue	LIRR: Main Line	Queens	On hold	Construction deferred to 2025–2029 Capital Program
Smith–Ninth Streets	"F" train "G" train	Brooklyn	In pre-planning	
Fourth Avenue/Ninth Street	"F" train "G" train "R" train	Brooklyn	In pre-planning	
Flushing Avenue	"G" train	Brooklyn	In pre-planning	
Myrtle–Willoughby Avenues	"G" train	Brooklyn	In pre-planning	
Nassau Avenue	"G" train	Brooklyn	In pre-planning	
Kings Highway	"N" train	Brooklyn	In pre-planning	In first Bensonhurst station grouping
Vernon Boulevard – Jackson Avenue	"7" train "7" express train	Queens	In pre-planning	
Wakefield	MNRR: Harlem Line	The Bronx	In pre-planning; funding on hold	
Broad Street	"J" train "Z" train	Manhattan	On hold	Part of 45 Broad Street stalled development
East Broadway	"F" train "F" express train	Manhattan	On hold	Part of 247 Cherry Street, 269 South Street, and 259 Clinton Street stalled development
Mets-Willets Point	LIRR: Port Washington Branch	Queens	On hold	Postponed indefinitely due to pending LaGuardia Airport Access Study
Rector Street	"R" train "W" train	Manhattan	On hold	Southbound platform only; will be constructed by developer of 42 Trinity Place
Republic	LIRR: Ronkonkoma Branch	Suffolk County	Proposed station	
Sunnyside	LIRR: Main Line	Queens	Proposed station	Originally planned as part of the East Side Access project; now proposed as part of the MTA's 20-year needs assessment
77th Street	"6" train "6" express train	Manhattan	Awaiting zoning approval (ZFA)	Southbound platform only; proposed to be constructed by Northwell Health as part of Lenox Hill Hospital expansion
Halsey Street	"J" train	Brooklyn	Easement designed (ZFA), funding not committed	Northbound platform only
Union Street	"R" train	Brooklyn	Easement designed (ZFA), funding not committed	Southbound platform only
25th Street	"R" train	Brooklyn	Easement designed (ZFA), funding not committed	Northbound platform only
Canal Street	"1" train	Manhattan	In pre-planning	ZFA easement for northbound platform only. Full accessibility proposed as part of 2025–2029 Capital Program.
Beach 36th Street	"A" train	Queens	In pre-planning	Transit plaza and associated space outside station secured as an easement. Full accessibility proposed as part of 2025–2029 Capital Program.
190th Street (Note: The 190th Street station already has elevators between a lower and upper mezzanine, but no ground level or platform access.)	"A" train	Manhattan	Contract award pending	Contract pending for uptown platform only. Full accessibility proposed as part of 2025–2029 Capital Program.
157th Street	"1" train	Manhattan	In pre-planning	Accessibility proposed as part of 2025–2029 Capital Program.
191st Street	"1" train	Manhattan	In pre-planning	Accessibility proposed as part of 2025–2029 Capital Program.
Cathedral Parkway-110th Street	"1" train	Manhattan	In pre-planning	Accessibility proposed as part of 2025–2029 Capital Program.
125th Street	"2" train "3" train	Manhattan	In pre-planning	Accessibility proposed as part of 2025–2029 Capital Program.
110th Street–Malcolm X Plaza	"2" train "3" train	Manhattan	In pre-planning	Accessibility proposed as part of 2025–2029 Capital Program.
155th Street	"C" train	Manhattan	In pre-planning	Accessibility proposed as part of 2025–2029 Capital Program.
116th Street	"B" train "C" train	Manhattan	In pre-planning	Accessibility proposed as part of 2025–2029 Capital Program.
Canal Street	"N" train "Q" train "R" train "W" train "J" train "Z" train	Manhattan	In pre-planning	Accessibility proposed as part of 2025–2029 Capital Program.
President Street–Medgar Evers College	"2" train "5" train	Brooklyn	In pre-planning	Accessibility proposed as part of 2025–2029 Capital Program.
Sterling Street	"2" train "5" train	Brooklyn	In pre-planning	Accessibility proposed as part of 2025–2029 Capital Program.
Grand Army Plaza	"2" train "3" train	Brooklyn	In pre-planning	Accessibility proposed as part of 2025–2029 Capital Program.
Nostrand Avenue	"3" train	Brooklyn	In pre-planning	Accessibility proposed as part of 2025–2029 Capital Program.
Saratoga Avenue	"3" train	Brooklyn	In pre-planning	Accessibility proposed as part of 2025–2029 Capital Program.
Franklin Avenue/Botanic Garden	"2" train "3" train "4" train "5" train Franklin Avenue Shuttle	Brooklyn	In pre-planning	Accessibility proposed as part of 2025–2029 Capital Program.
Brighton Beach	"B" train "Q" train	Brooklyn	In pre-planning	Accessibility proposed as part of 2025–2029 Capital Program.
53rd Street	"R" train	Brooklyn	In pre-planning	Accessibility proposed as part of 2025–2029 Capital Program.
Bedford-Nostrand Avenues	"G" train	Brooklyn	In pre-planning	Accessibility proposed as part of 2025–2029 Capital Program.
Cypress Hills	"J" train	Brooklyn	In pre-planning	Accessibility proposed as part of 2025–2029 Capital Program.
Van Siclen Avenue	"J" train "Z" train	Brooklyn	In pre-planning	Accessibility proposed as part of 2025–2029 Capital Program.
103rd Street–Corona Plaza	"7" train	Queens	In pre-planning	Accessibility proposed as part of 2025–2029 Capital Program.
121st Street	"J" train "Z" train	Queens	In pre-planning	Accessibility proposed as part of 2025–2029 Capital Program.
63rd Drive-Rego Park	"M" train "R" train	Queens	In pre-planning	Accessibility proposed as part of 2025–2029 Capital Program.
Elmhurst Avenue	"M" train "R" train	Queens	In pre-planning	Accessibility proposed as part of 2025–2029 Capital Program.
Grand Avenue-Newtown	"M" train "R" train	Queens	In pre-planning	Accessibility proposed as part of 2025–2029 Capital Program.
Beach 90th Street	"A" train Rockaway Park Shuttle	Queens	In pre-planning	Accessibility proposed as part of 2025–2029 Capital Program.
Prospect Avenue	"2" train "5" train	The Bronx	In pre-planning	Accessibility proposed as part of 2025–2029 Capital Program.
West Farms Square–East Tremont Avenue	"2" train "5" train	The Bronx	In pre-planning	Accessibility proposed as part of 2025–2029 Capital Program.
Woodlawn	"4" train	The Bronx	In pre-planning	Accessibility proposed as part of 2025–2029 Capital Program.
Baychester Avenue	"5" train	The Bronx	In pre-planning	Accessibility proposed as part of 2025–2029 Capital Program.
Eastchester-Dyre Avenue	"5" train	The Bronx	In pre-planning	Accessibility proposed as part of 2025–2029 Capital Program.
Elder Avenue	"6" train	The Bronx	In pre-planning	Accessibility proposed as part of 2025–2029 Capital Program.
182nd–183rd Streets	"B" train "D" train	The Bronx	In pre-planning	Accessibility proposed as part of 2025–2029 Capital Program.
Fordham Road	"B" train "D" train	The Bronx	In pre-planning	Accessibility proposed as part of 2025–2029 Capital Program.
Norwood–205th Street	"D" train	The Bronx	In pre-planning	Accessibility proposed as part of 2025–2029 Capital Program.
Prince's Bay	Staten Island Railway	Staten Island	In pre-planning	Accessibility proposed as part of 2025–2029 Capital Program.

== See also ==
- New York City Subway stations
- List of New York City Subway stations
- List of New York City Subway transfer stations
- List of New York City Subway terminals
- List of closed New York City Subway stations
- List of Staten Island Railway stations
- List of Long Island Rail Road stations
- List of Metro-North Railroad stations

Accessibility of other systems:

- Boston
- London
- Toronto
