= List of bus routes in Nassau County, New York =

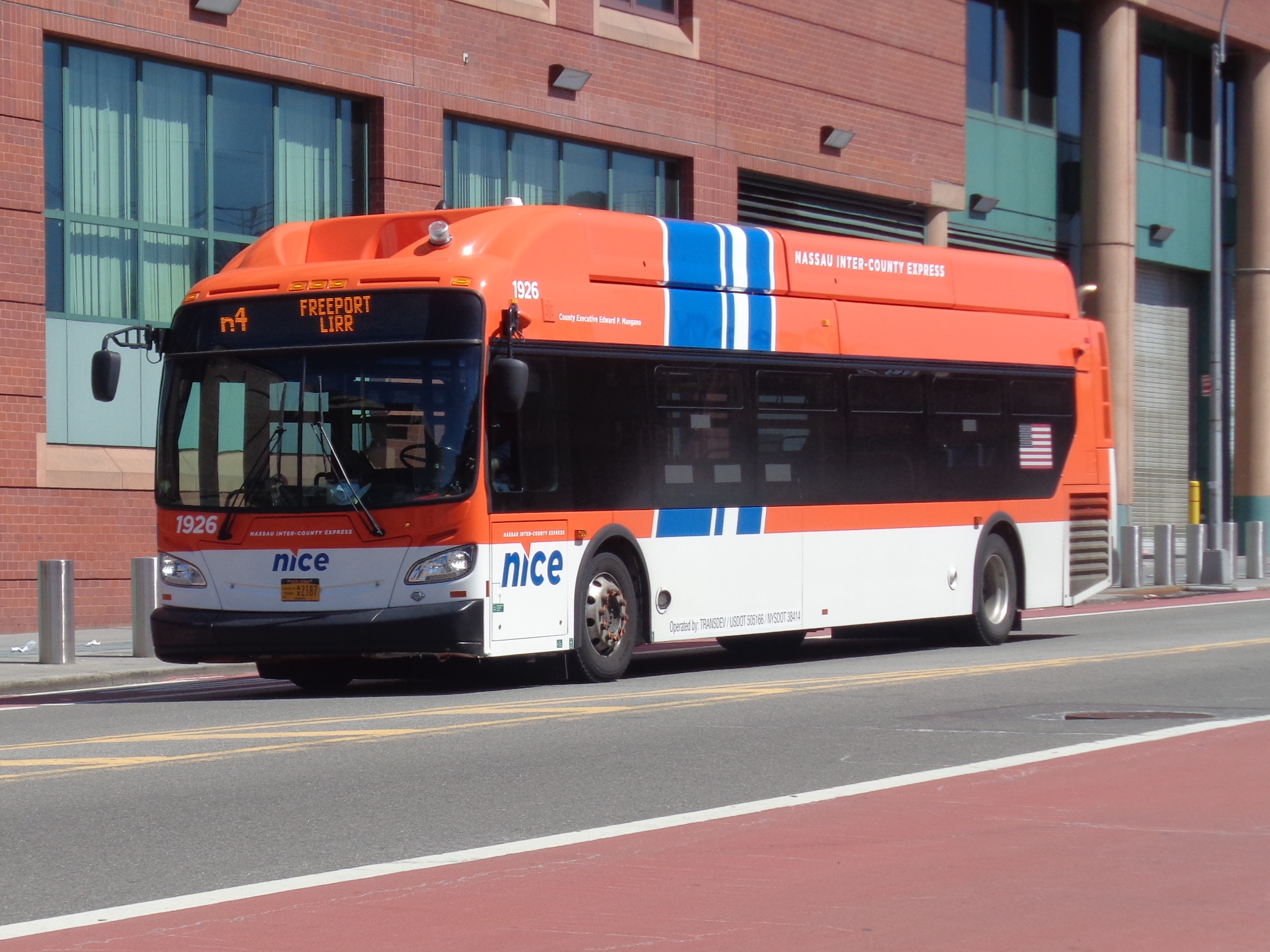
A NICE bus in Jamaica on the n4.

The following bus routes are operated in Nassau County, New York. Most of these routes are operated under Nassau Inter-County Express (NICE), formerly MTA Long Island Bus, except in Greater Long Beach, where that city operates its own bus service through Long Beach Bus.

These tables give details for the routes that service Nassau County primarily. For details on routes that run into Nassau County but do not service it primarily, see:

- List of bus routes in Queens: Q2, Q5, Q36, Q46, Q82, Q85, Q87, Q89, Q110, Q111, Q113, Q114
- List of express bus routes in New York City: QM6, QM36, QM64
- List of bus routes in Suffolk County: 495 HOV Long Island Express

== Routes ==
Some of routes listed below are the direct descendants of streetcar lines (see List of streetcar lines on Long Island and in Queens), and most were privately operated prior to 1973.

=== Nassau Inter-County Express ===
NICE routes are designated on the buses, bus stop signs, and timetables with a lowercase "n". Previously, the routes were designated with an uppercase "N", akin to routes in larger bus systems surrounding the area.

Routes shown are for the full route except for branching. The n4, n6 and the n40/n41 (n40 daytime, n41 overnight only) provide service 24 hours a day, express routes (X-suffix on the route number) operate rush hours only, with all other routes operating daily except late nights unless otherwise noted.

- Roosevelt Field Mall note: All routes entering Roosevelt Field Mall from Old Country Road travel to/from points east via East Gate Boulevard, and to/from points west via Ring Road West.
- Queens note: NICE routes to Jamaica and Flushing do not carry customers wholly within Queens except where noted.

Connections to New York City Subway stations at the bus routes' terminals are also listed where applicable.

==== n1 to n27 ====
Route	Terminals			Major streets traveled	Notes
n1	Hewlett; Broadway and Rockaway Avenue	↔	Elmont; Hempstead Turnpike and Elmont Road	All trips: Central Avenue, Elmont Road; Bellerose and Jamaica trips: Hempstead Turnpike; Jamaica trips: Hillside Avenue	Jamaica served weekday rush hours only, to Jamaica in the morning and from Jamaica in the evening.; Alternate rush trips terminate at the Valley Stream station instead of Hewlett.; Weekday daytime service runs alternately with Old Central-Mill Road n1 service below.; Bellerose served weekends daytime only. Runs independently of weekend n1 service below.; LIRR connections: Hewlett, Gibson, Valley Stream
n1	Hewlett; Broadway and Rockaway Avenue	→ AM ← PM	Jamaica, Queens; 168th Street Bus Terminal; Island 3, Stand 4	All trips: Central Avenue, Elmont Road; Bellerose and Jamaica trips: Hempstead Turnpike; Jamaica trips: Hillside Avenue	Jamaica served weekday rush hours only, to Jamaica in the morning and from Jamaica in the evening.; Alternate rush trips terminate at the Valley Stream station instead of Hewlett.; Weekday daytime service runs alternately with Old Central-Mill Road n1 service below.; Bellerose served weekends daytime only. Runs independently of weekend n1 service below.; LIRR connections: Hewlett, Gibson, Valley Stream
n1	Hewlett; Broadway and Rockaway Avenue	↔	Bellerose, Queens; 239th Street and Jericho Turnpike	All trips: Central Avenue, Elmont Road; Bellerose and Jamaica trips: Hempstead Turnpike; Jamaica trips: Hillside Avenue	Jamaica served weekday rush hours only, to Jamaica in the morning and from Jamaica in the evening.; Alternate rush trips terminate at the Valley Stream station instead of Hewlett.; Weekday daytime service runs alternately with Old Central-Mill Road n1 service below.; Bellerose served weekends daytime only. Runs independently of weekend n1 service below.; LIRR connections: Hewlett, Gibson, Valley Stream
n1	Valley Stream; Old Central Avenue and Mill Road	↔	Elmont; Hempstead Turnpike and Elmont Road	Central Avenue, Elmont Road	Weekday daytime service which runs alternately with regular n1 service above.; Weekend early a.m. and evening service which runs independently of regular n1 service above.
n4	Freeport; LIRR station	↔	Jamaica, Queens; Parsons Boulevard and Archer Avenue at Jamaica Center–York College ( E J Z trains)	Merrick Road, Merrick Boulevard	Operates at all times.; LIRR connections: Freeport
n4X	Express service				
n4X	Freeport; LIRR station	↔	Jamaica, Queens; Parsons Boulevard and Archer Avenue at Jamaica Center–York College ( E J Z trains)	Merrick Road, Merrick Boulevard	Weekday rush hour service only.; LIRR connections: Freeport
n6	Hempstead; Transit Center; Bays 8, 9 and 10	↔	Jamaica, Queens; 168th Street Bus Terminal; Island 3, Stands 5, 6	Hempstead Turnpike, Hillside Avenue	Operates at all times.; Some trips utilize 60 foot articulated buses.; LIRR connections: Hempstead
n6X	Express service				
n6X	Hempstead; Transit Center; Jackson Street	↔	Jamaica, Queens; 168th Street Bus Terminal; Island 3, Stand 6	Hempstead Turnpike, Hillside Avenue	Weekday rush hour service only; LIRR connections: Hempstead
n15	Long Beach; LIRR station	↔	East Garden City; Roosevelt Field Mall; Bay 5	All trips: Long Beach Road, Woodfield Road; Roosevelt Field trips: Clinton Street; Mineola trips: Washington Avenue	Alternate weekday buses serve Roosevelt Field except early a.m. and late nights.; Weekdays, buses terminate in Hempstead early a.m., late nights and alternately during middays.; Alternate weekday rush hour buses serve Mineola.; Most weekend service alternately terminates at Hempstead or Roosevelt Field.; LIRR connections: Long Beach, Island Park, Rockville Centre, Lakeview, West Hempstead, Hempstead, Mineola
n15	Long Beach; LIRR station	↔	Hempstead; Transit Center	All trips: Long Beach Road, Woodfield Road; Roosevelt Field trips: Clinton Street; Mineola trips: Washington Avenue	Alternate weekday buses serve Roosevelt Field except early a.m. and late nights.; Weekdays, buses terminate in Hempstead early a.m., late nights and alternately during middays.; Alternate weekday rush hour buses serve Mineola.; Most weekend service alternately terminates at Hempstead or Roosevelt Field.; LIRR connections: Long Beach, Island Park, Rockville Centre, Lakeview, West Hempstead, Hempstead, Mineola
n15	Long Beach; LIRR station	↔	Mineola; Intermodal Center	All trips: Long Beach Road, Woodfield Road; Roosevelt Field trips: Clinton Street; Mineola trips: Washington Avenue	Alternate weekday buses serve Roosevelt Field except early a.m. and late nights.; Weekdays, buses terminate in Hempstead early a.m., late nights and alternately during middays.; Alternate weekday rush hour buses serve Mineola.; Most weekend service alternately terminates at Hempstead or Roosevelt Field.; LIRR connections: Long Beach, Island Park, Rockville Centre, Lakeview, West Hempstead, Hempstead, Mineola
n16	Rockville Centre; LIRR station	↔	East Garden City; Roosevelt Field Mall	Hempstead Avenue (Rockville Centre), Franklin Street, Westbury Boulevard	Weekday service only.; Evening trips extended to serve Nassau Community College.; Daytime trips serve 60 Charles Lindbergh Boulevard.; LIRR connections: Rockville Centre, Hempstead
n16C	Express service				
n16C	Hempstead; Transit Center	↔	Nassau Community College	Rockville Centre trips: Hempstead Avenue, Franklin Avenue, All trips: Hempstead Turnpike	No evening service.; About one-third of trips serve Rockville Centre and alternately run local with the n16 from/to Hempstead.; All service runs express between Hempstead to NCC with one intermediate stop at Hofstra University.; LIRR connections: Rockville Centre, Hempstead
n16C	Rockville Centre; LIRR station	↔	Nassau Community College	Rockville Centre trips: Hempstead Avenue, Franklin Avenue, All trips: Hempstead Turnpike	No evening service.; About one-third of trips serve Rockville Centre and alternately run local with the n16 from/to Hempstead.; All service runs express between Hempstead to NCC with one intermediate stop at Hofstra University.; LIRR connections: Rockville Centre, Hempstead
n19	Freeport; LIRR station	↺	Massapequa; Hicksville Road and Sunrise Highway	"Loop" service: (see Notes): n19: Merrick Road, Hicksville Road, then: n19X: Sunrise Highway	"Loop" runs as follows: n19 runs counter-clockwise from Freeport, n19X runs clockwise from Freeport with each service switching to the other at East Massapequa for the return to Freeport.; Weekday rush hour service only with most a.m. service to East Massapequa being n19, and most p.m. service being n19X.; LIRR connections: Freeport (n19, n19X), Merrick (n19X), Bellmore (n19X)
n19X	Freeport; LIRR station	↻	Massapequa; Hicksville Road and Sunrise Highway	"Loop" service: (see Notes): n19: Merrick Road, Hicksville Road, then: n19X: Sunrise Highway	"Loop" runs as follows: n19 runs counter-clockwise from Freeport, n19X runs clockwise from Freeport with each service switching to the other at East Massapequa for the return to Freeport.; Weekday rush hour service only with most a.m. service to East Massapequa being n19, and most p.m. service being n19X.; LIRR connections: Freeport (n19, n19X), Merrick (n19X), Bellmore (n19X)
n20G	Great Neck; LIRR station	↔	Flushing, Queens; Roosevelt Avenue and Main Street at Flushing –Main Street ( 7 <7> trains)	Northern Boulevard	LIRR connections: Great Neck, Flushing-Main Street
n20H	Great Neck; LIRR station	↔	Hicksville; LIRR station	Northern Boulevard	No stops between Marion Street in Greenvale and Manhattan Drive in Jericho, except: New York Institute of Technology (NYIT); LIU C.W. Post; SUNY Old Westbury; LIRR connections: Great Neck, Hicksville
n20X	Express service				
n20X	Roslyn; Clock Tower	↔	Flushing, Queens; Roosevelt Avenue and Main Street at Flushing – Main Street ( 7 <7> trains)	Northern Boulevard	Weekday rush hour service only.; Bypasses Great Neck.; LIRR connections: Flushing-Main Street
n21	Glen Cove; Police Station	↔	Great Neck; LIRR station	Glen Avenue, Bryant Avenue, Northern Boulevard	Limited rush hour service operates between Glen Cove and the Roslyn Clock Tower.; Sundays, all service operates between Glen Cove and the Roslyn Clock Tower.; Non-Sunday service shared with n20H from Roslyn to Great Neck.; LIRR connections: Glen Street, Great Neck
n22	Hicksville; LIRR station	↔	Jamaica, Queens; 168th Street Bus Terminal; Island 3, Stand 3	Prospect Avenue, West John Street, Westbury Avenue, Hillside Avenue	Weekday service is split at Mineola in both directions.; LIRR connections: Hicksville, Carle Place, Mineola
n22X	Express service				
n22X	East Garden City; Roosevelt Field Mall	↔	Jamaica, Queens; 168th Street Bus Terminal; Island 3, Stand 2	Old Country Road, Hillside Avenue	Weekday rush hour service only, bypasses Mineola.
n23	Mineola; Intermodal Center; Bay 3	↔	Manorhaven; Manorhaven Park	Willis Avenue, Main Street (Roslyn), Port Washington Boulevard, New Shore Road	LIRR connections: Mineola, Roslyn, Port Washington
n24	Hicksville; LIRR station	↔	Jamaica, Queens; 168th Street Bus Terminal; Island 3, Stand 1	Old Country Road, Jericho Turnpike, Jamaica Avenue, Hillside Avenue	Open-door in Queens as far west as 239th Street.; All service is split at Roosevelt Field in both directions, except for weekend early a.m. and late p.m. trips.; Weekend-only daytime Bellerose short-turn service runs alternately with Jamaica service.; LIRR connections: Hicksville, Mineola, Queens Village
n24	Hicksville; LIRR station	↔	Bellerose, Queens; 239th Street and Jericho Turnpike	Old Country Road, Jericho Turnpike	Open-door in Queens as far west as 239th Street.; All service is split at Roosevelt Field in both directions, except for weekend early a.m. and late p.m. trips.; Weekend-only daytime Bellerose short-turn service runs alternately with Jamaica service.; LIRR connections: Hicksville, Mineola, Queens Village
n25	Lynbrook; LIRR station	↔	Great Neck; LIRR station	All trips: Franklin Avenue, New Hyde Park Road, Community Drive, Weekend trips: Middle Neck Road, Steamboat Road	n25 service Monday through Friday only.; n25/58 combined service weekends only.; LIRR connections: Lynbrook, Stewart Manor, New Hyde Park, Great Neck
n25/58	Lynbrook; LIRR station	↔	Kings Point; United States Merchant Marine Academy; Steamboat Road and Stepping Stone Lane	All trips: Franklin Avenue, New Hyde Park Road, Community Drive, Weekend trips: Middle Neck Road, Steamboat Road	n25 service Monday through Friday only.; n25/58 combined service weekends only.; LIRR connections: Lynbrook, Stewart Manor, New Hyde Park, Great Neck
n26	Great Neck; LIRR station	← AM → PM	Jamaica, Queens; 168th Street Bus Terminal; Island 3, Stand 4	Community Drive, Hillside Avenue	Weekday rush hour service only, to Great Neck in the a.m., from Great Neck in the p.m.; LIRR connections: Great Neck
n27	Hempstead; Transit Center; Bay 24	↔	Glen Cove; Police Station	Westbury Boulevard, Glen Cove Road, Roslyn Road, Glen Cove Avenue	Weekday service only.; Daytime trips serve 60 Charles Lindbergh Boulevard.; Some daytime and all evening Hempstead-bound service terminates/begins at Roosevelt Field Mall.; LIRR connections: Hempstead, Roslyn, Greenvale, Sea Cliff, Glen Street

==== n31 to n88X ====
Route	Terminals			Major streets traveled	Notes
n31	Hempstead; Transit Center; Bay 4, 5	↔	Far Rockaway, Queens; Plainview Avenue and Beach 20th Street near Far Rockaway – Mott Avenue ( A train)	Hempstead Avenue (Lynbrook), West Broadway (Woodmere), Central Avenue (Lawrence)	No Sunday service.; Route shared with n32 from Hempstead to Hewlett.; Open-door in Far Rockaway.; LIRR connections: Hempstead, West Hempstead, Malverne, Hewlett, Lawrence, Inwood
n31X; MMS	Express service				
n31X; MMS	Hempstead; Transit Center; Bay 4, 5	↔	Far Rockaway, Queens; Mott Avenue and Central Avenue near Far Rockaway – Mott Avenue ( A train)	Peninsula Boulevard, West Broadway (Woodmere)	Combined with the former Mercy Medical Community Shuttle.; Weekday rush hours only.; Early a.m. service toward Far Rockaway starts at Hempstead Avenue and Merrick Road.; Open-door in Far Rockaway.; LIRR connections: Hempstead, West Hempstead, Malverne, Hewlett, Lawrence, Inwood
n32	Hempstead; Transit Center; Bay 4, 5	↔	Far Rockaway, Queens; Plainview Avenue and Beach 20th Street near Far Rockaway – Mott Avenue ( A train)	Hempstead Avenue (Lynbrook), Broadway (Woodmere), Central Avenue (Lawrence)	Route shared with n31 from Hempstead to Hewlett.; Open-door in Far Rockaway.; LIRR connections: Hempstead, West Hempstead, Malverne, Hewlett, Woodmere, Cedarhurst
n33	Long Beach; LIRR station	↔	Far Rockaway, Queens; Plainview Avenue and Beach 20th Street at Far Rockaway – Mott Avenue ( A train)	Beech Street	No Sunday service.; Open-door in Far Rockaway.; No passengers carried solely within Long Beach. Customers traveling within Long Beach must use the City of Long Beach West End route.; Last eastbound pickup is at Connecticut Avenue in Long Beach.; First westbound dropoff is at Brookline Avenue in E. Atlantic Beach.; LIRR connections: Long Beach
n35	Baldwin Harbor; Atlantic Avenue	↔	Westbury; Rockland Street	Grand Avenue, Baldwin Road, Clinton Street, Stewart Avenue, Post Avenue	Most Westbury-bound service alternately terminates with short-turns at Roosevelt Field, except for weekday peak hours to Westbury in the a.m. and from Westbury in the p.m.; About one-half of weekend Westbury trips end at Hempstead Transit Center.; LIRR connections: Baldwin, Hempstead, Westbury
n40	Freeport; LIRR station	↔	Mineola; Intermodal Center; Bay 4 and 5	North Main Street, Nassau Road, Franklin Street	Operates at all times except overnights.; LIRR connections: Freeport, Hempstead, Mineola
n40X	Express service				
n40X	Baldwin Harbor; Atlantic Avenue	↔	Mineola; Mineola Intermodal Center	Atlantic Avenue, North Main Street, Nassau Road, Franklin Street, Mineola Boulevard	Operates weekday rush hours only.; LIRR connections: Freeport, Hempstead, Mineola
n41	Freeport; LIRR station	↔	Hempstead; Transit Center	North Main Street, Nassau Road	Overnight service only.; LIRR connections: Freeport, Hempstead
n43	Freeport; LIRR station	↔	Garden City; Commercial Avenue	Babylon Turnpike, Nassau Road, Uniondale Avenue	LIRR connections: Freeport
n43X	Express service				
n43X	Freeport; LIRR station	↔	East Garden City; Roosevelt Field Mall	Nassau Road, Uniondale Avenue	Operates weekday rush hours only.; LIRR connections: Freeport
n48	Hempstead; Transit Center; Bay 22, 23	↔	Hicksville; Broadway Mall	Shared: Front Street; n48: Carman Avenue, Duffy Avenue; n49: Newbridge Road; Shared: North Broadway	No Sunday n48 service.; LIRR connections: Hempstead, Hicksville
n49	Hempstead; Transit Center; Bay 22, 23	↔	Hicksville; Broadway Mall	Shared: Front Street; n48: Carman Avenue, Duffy Avenue; n49: Newbridge Road; Shared: North Broadway	No Sunday n48 service.; LIRR connections: Hempstead, Hicksville
n54	Hempstead; Transit Center; Bay 18	↔	Amityville, Suffolk County; Amityville LIRR Station	Shared: Jerusalem Avenue; n54: Washington Avenue; n55: Broadway; Shared: Sunrise Highway	No Sunday n54 service.; LIRR connections: Hempstead, Seaford (n54 only), Massapequa, Massapequa Park, Amityville
n55	Hempstead; Transit Center; Bay 18	↔	Amityville, Suffolk County; Amityville LIRR Station	Shared: Jerusalem Avenue; n54: Washington Avenue; n55: Broadway; Shared: Sunrise Highway	No Sunday n54 service.; LIRR connections: Hempstead, Seaford (n54 only), Massapequa, Massapequa Park, Amityville
n57	Great Neck; LIRR station	↻ AM ↺ PM	Kings Point; Kings Point Pond	Clockwise Loop: Bayview Avenue, Kings Point Road, Station Road	Weekday service only, clockwise in a.m. hours and counter-clockwise in the p.m.; LIRR connections: Great Neck
n58 (n25/58)	Great Neck; LIRR station	↔	Kings Point; United States Merchant Marine Academy; Steamboat Road and Stepping Stone Lane	Middle Neck Road, Steamboat Road	Monday through Friday service only. Weekends, use the n25/58 combination (see above for more info).; LIRR connections: Great Neck
n70	Hempstead; Transit Center; Bay 19, 20, 21	↔	East Farmingdale, Suffolk County; Farmingdale State College	Hempstead Turnpike, Conklin Street, Broad Hollow Road	LIRR connections: Hempstead; Some trips utilize 60 foot articulated buses.
n71	East Farmingdale, Suffolk County; Farmingdale State College	↔	Amityville, Suffolk County; Amityville LIRR Station	Broad Hollow Road, Fulton Street, Carmans Road, Loudon Avenue	LIRR connections: Amityville
n72	Temporarily replaced by expanded n70 service on January 7, 2024.				
n78	Hicksville; LIRR station	↔	Plainview; Newtown Road	Shared: Old Country Road; n79: Manetto Hill Road, Woodbury Road, Jericho Turnpike	Weekday and Saturday rush hours only. No midday or Sunday service.; Same route from Hicksville to Plainview-Manetto Hill Road.; LIRR connections: Hicksville
n79	Hicksville; LIRR station	↔	Huntington Station, Suffolk County; Walt Whitman Shops	Shared: Old Country Road; n79: Manetto Hill Road, Woodbury Road, Jericho Turnpike	Weekday and Saturday rush hours only. No midday or Sunday service.; Same route from Hicksville to Plainview-Manetto Hill Road.; LIRR connections: Hicksville
n80	Hicksville; LIRR station	↔	East Massapequa; Unqua Road and Sunrise Highway	South Broadway, Hicksville Road, Sunrise Highway	Weekday rush hour service only.; LIRR connections: Hicksville, Massapequa, Massapequa Park
n88X	Freeport; LIRR station	↔	Jones Beach; West Bathhouse	Meadowbrook State Parkway, Ocean Parkway	Summer 2025 daily service from May 23 until September 15.; Some trips may use articulated 60 foot buses.; LIRR connections: Freeport

==== Shuttles ====
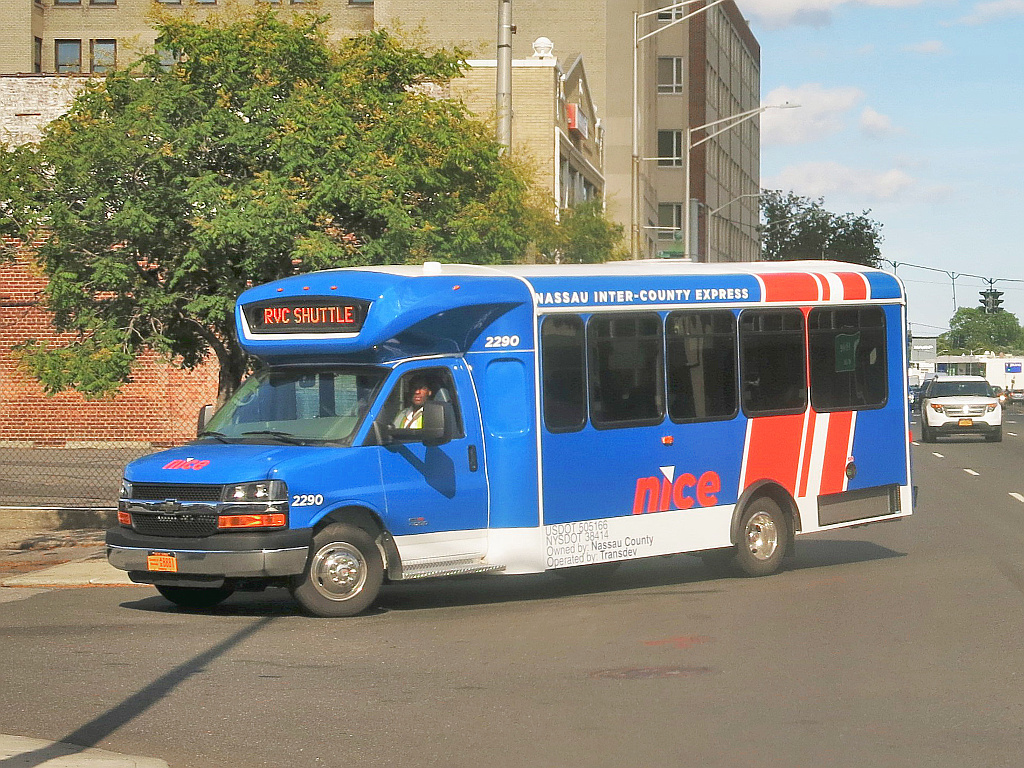
A shuttle van in service on the now-discontinued Rockville Centre Community Shuttle

The Elmont Flexi is a resurrected former regular route, with the Port Washington shuttle being a former MSBA shuttle. These shuttles are now serviced with passenger vans, and operate only during weekday rush hours.

Route	Terminals			Major streets traveled	Notes
Elmont; Flexi	Elmont; Hempstead Turnpike and Covert Avenue	↔	Valley Stream; Green Acres Shopping Mall	All trips: Meacham Avenue, Corona Avenue, Sunrise Highway, Hewlett trips: Mill Road	Formerly route n2.; Additional midday and evening service.; Trips alternate between both terminals.; Flexi Stops: Fletcher Avenue/Dutch Broadway, LIJ Valley Stream, Wheeler Avenue/Rockaway Parkway, Hendrickson Park, Valley Stream Boulevard, Peninsula Boulevard.; LIRR connections: Valley Stream
Elmont; Flexi	Elmont; Hempstead Turnpike and Covert Avenue	↔	Hewlett West Broadway and Mill Road	All trips: Meacham Avenue, Corona Avenue, Sunrise Highway, Hewlett trips: Mill Road	Formerly route n2.; Additional midday and evening service.; Trips alternate between both terminals.; Flexi Stops: Fletcher Avenue/Dutch Broadway, LIJ Valley Stream, Wheeler Avenue/Rockaway Parkway, Hendrickson Park, Valley Stream Boulevard, Peninsula Boulevard.; LIRR connections: Valley Stream
Mercy; Medical; Community; Shuttle	Merged into route n31X (see above) on January 5, 2025.				Formerly route n17.
Port; Washington; Shuttle	Port Washington; LIRR station	← AM → PM	Port Washington North; Clockwise Loop (see Notes)	Main Street (Port Wash), Shore Road, Soundview Drive	Early a.m., later p.m. rush hours only.; Loop via Soundview Drive: a.m. service starts at Driftwood Drive, p.m. service ends at Waterview Drive.; LIRR connections: Port Washington
Port; Washington; Shuttle	Port Washington; LIRR station	↔	Roslyn; Gerry Park	West Shore Road, Harbor Park Drive, Main Street (Roslyn)	Later a.m., early p.m. rush hours only.; LIRR connections: Port Washington

==== Current route history ====
Route	History
n1	Operated by Bee Line until 1973 Metropolitan Suburban Bus Authority (MSBA) takeover.; On January 1, 2012, service to the Valley Stream LIRR station was restored.; On March 30, 2014, six eastbound AM reverse-peak trips and 10 westbound PM reverse-peak trips were cut back from Jamaica to Elmont Road since ridership was found to be much lower on this section of the route.; On January 7, 2024, some weekday short-turn trips began terminating at Valley Stream instead of Green Acres at their southern end, and service was increased to run every 18 to 20 minutes.; On May 26, 2024, weekday Elmont trips were extended to UBS Arena.; On September 1, 2024, weekend service was expanded along with numerous new trips running between Old Central Road in Valley Stream (completely bypassing Valley Stream LIRR station and Green Acres Mall) and 239th Street in Bellerose, Queens, near Cahill Park.; Effective January 5, 2025, all weekend service has been swapped around. Trips starting and ending in Bellerose now serve the Valley Stream LIRR Station, Green Acres Mall and have been extended to Hewlett. Trips starting and ending at Hempstead Turnpike now are early a.m. and late day trips ending at Old Central Road, completely bypassing both Valley Stream LIRR Station and Green Acres Mall.; On May 25, 2025, weekday trips to UBS Arena were cut back to Elmont Road and Hempstead Turnpike.
n4	Bee Line began operating the route in the mid-1920s, competing with the New York and Long Island Traction Company's "Brooklyn-Freeport" line.; Taken over by the MSBA in 1973.; Served 168th Street/Jamaica Avenue station until 1977.; Served 169th Street/Hillside Avenue station until December 11, 1988, when the current terminus at the Jamaica Center – Parsons/Archer station was opened.; All trips began running between Jamaica and Freeport on April 8, 2012. In addition, peak service was increased to operate every 7.5 minutes from operating every ten.; On May 2, 2021, some stops in Queens were eliminated to speed up service.
n4X	New express route introduced by NICE on September 1, 2013.; On January 6, 2025, two new express stops were added in Queens at Merrick Boulevard and Springfield Boulevard and at Archer Avenue and 165th Street.
n6	Replaced New York and Long Island Traction Company "Hempstead-Jamaica" line on April 5, 1926.; Operated by Bee Line until 1973 MSBA takeover.; On April 8, 2012, midday and Saturday service was reduced to run every 12 minutes instead of every 10 minutes.; On January 7, 2024, some Hempstead-bound trips short-turn at the UBS Arena.
n6X	New express route introduced by NICE on April 8, 2012, replacing the n6L limited-stop service.; Service between Hempstead Transit Center and Nassau Community College (NCC) was added on September 1, 2013. The express stop at Westminster Road was discontinued, while a stop at Springfield Boulevard was added.; Service to NCC was discontinued in 2017 and became the n16X.; Effective May 28, 2023, the Hempstead-bound stop at Francis Lewis Boulevard and Hillside Avenue was discontinued, and Jamaica-bound buses began skipping the stop at 179th Street.; On May 25, 2025, a new express stop was added at Hempstead Turnpike and Westminster Road.; On September 7, 2025, a new express stop was added at Hempstead Turnpike and Cherry Valley Avenue.
n15	Operated by Rockville Centre Bus Corporation, a subsidiary of Bee Line, until 1973 MSBA takeover.; On April 8, 2012, midday and Saturday service was reduced from operating every 15 minutes to running every 20 minutes.; On May 2, 2021, bus service was rerouted to Merrick Road in Rockville Centre, bypassing the LIRR station.; On September 3, 2023, service via Old Country Road was removed from Roosevelt Field to Mineola, which is now a terminal.
n16	Operated by Rockville Centre Bus Corporation, a subsidiary of Bee Line, until 1973 MSBA takeover.; Service between Rockville Centre and Silver Lake, Baldwin was discontinued and trips that only ran between Hempstead and Roosevelt Field were discontinued and replaced by an extension of the n43 on April 8, 2012.; Saturday service was eliminated effective April 9, 2017.; On May 2, 2021, multiple changes were made to n16 service. The sequence of stops at the route's northern end was revised. Southbound trips would start at Nassau Community College (NCC)'s Life Science Building on Endo Boulevard, stop at Roosevelt Field, Social Services, and go to Hempstead, while northbound trips would do the reverse. With the discontinuation of service to the Cradle of Aviation, the Gates, College Store, and Bradley Hall, service would only run to the eastern portion of NCC. In addition, service began running every 30 minutes, and service south of Sunrise Highway was discontinued, with buses terminating at the LIRR station.; On September 5, 2021, stops along Park Avenue on the way to the Rockville Centre LIRR station were restored.; On September 1, 2024, the n16 was rerouted to serve the bookstore and Bradley Hall at Nassau Community College.; On September 7, 2025, daytime alternate service from Hempstead started with the n16C to Rockville Centre, and also with the n27 to Roosevelt Field.
n16C	Created on September 8, 2025. Replaced n16X. One-third of trips run to Rockville Centre alternately with the n16.
n19	Operated by Utility Lines, a subsidiary of Bee Line, until 1973 MSBA takeover.; Former eastern terminus was the Patchogue LIRR station.; When taken over by MSBA, route was truncated to Babylon. Portion from Babylon to Patchogue became the S40 (Suffolk Transit) route.; Service was reduced on April 8, 2012. Midday and Saturday service began operating every 60 minutes instead of every 30 minutes, and peak service began operating every 30 to 40 minutes instead of every 20 to 30 minutes.; Route further truncated to Sunrise Mall on January 17, 2016, and until October 28, 2023, was replaced by the former S20 (Suffolk Transit) route, which added loop return service on Montauk Highway between Westfield Sunrise and Babylon.; On September 1, 2024, service to Sunrise Mall was discontinued and was truncated to Hicksville Road and Sunrise Highway; service east of Hicksville Road and west of Unqua Road would continue to be served by the n80.; n19 service runs in conjunction with the n19X, with both combining to form a loop.
n19X	New express route introduced by NICE on September 1, 2024, on a pilot basis.; Route operates along Sunrise Highway making express stops at Freeport, Merrick, Bellmore LIRR stations and Hicksville Road.; n19X service runs in conjunction with the n19, with both combining to form a loop.
n20 (n20G/H)	Replaced the New York and North Shore Traction Company's North Shore Line.; Operated by Schenck Transportation until 1973 MSBA takeover.; Rerouted from Roslyn railroad station to Hicksville in 1982.; Split into n20G and n20H to improve on-time performance on January 17, 2016.; n20H trips stopped making trips in the LIU Post campus on May 2, 2021 but were rerouted back on January 23, 2023. They began stopping on the NYIT campus on October 3, 2021.
n20X	New express route introduced by NICE on September 3, 2023, on a pilot basis.; Route bypasses Great Neck LIRR.; On October 8, 2023, a stop was added at Schenk Avenue and Port Washington Boulevard/Searingtown Road, and, due to low ridership, the stop at the Americana Mall was discontinued.; On January 7, 2024, an eastbound stop on Northern Boulevard at Francis Lewis Boulevard replaced the previous stop at 192nd Street, with an additional stop in Flushing added at Sanford Avenue and Kissena Boulevard.
n21	Operated by Schenck Transportation until 1973 MSBA takeover.; Service midday, nights, and weekends was discontinued on April 8, 2012.; Midday service was restored on September 1, 2013.; Route truncated to Great Neck from Flushing on January 17, 2016, and weekend service was restored.; Sunday service was discontinued on April 9, 2017.; Glen Avenue portion replaced "Sea Cliff Village" trolley line.; On September 3, 2023, weekday midday service was restored to the route.; On May 26, 2024, Sunday service was restored, but only east of the Roslyn Clock Tower. There is no service between 11 a.m. and 3:30 p.m.; On May 25, 2025, some weekday trips operating to and from Glen Cove began starting and ending at Roslyn Clock Tower.
n22	Replaced "Hicksville Line" trolley.; Operated by Schenck Transportation until 1973 MSBA takeover.; On September 6, 2020, service was split at Mineola to improve on time performance.; On September 3, 2023, service was increased to run every 15 minutes during most of the day between Mineola and Jamaica.; On September 7, 2025, n22 service became partially limited in Queens. Buses make these Queens stops: Jamaica Bus Terminal, 170th Street, 179th/182nd Street, 187th/188th Street, 205th Street, 212th Street/Hollis Court Boulevard, Springfield Boulevard, Winchester Boulevard.
n22X	New express route introduced by NICE on April 8, 2012.; Route was suspended from September 2020 to May 22, 2022, due to the COVID-19 pandemic. Route also was rerouted and multiple stops were removed when reactivated.; On May 28, 2023, in each direction, three express trips were discontinued, and three express trips were cut back to Roosevelt Field.; Service to Hicksville was eliminated and the route was cut back to Roosevelt Field on September 3, 2023.; On January 7, 2024, stops were added at Glen Cove Road/Clinton Road, Little Neck Parkway, and Winchester Boulevard.; On September 1, 2024, the n22X was rerouted to serve a new express stop on East Gate Boulevard and North Avenue, this stop is right before the route enters Old Country Road.; On January 6, 2025, the n22X has been rerouted along Herricks Road and a new express stop has been added near Jericho Turnpike.; On May 25, 2025, a new express stop was added on Hillside Avenue and Herricks Road.
n23	Replaced New York and North Shore Traction Company's "Port Washington Line" trolley.; Operated by Schenck Transportation until 1973 MSBA takeover.; On April 8, 2012, midday, night, and weekend service no longer operated to Mineola via Willis Avenue, 1st Street, and Mineola Boulevard. Instead, service would run along the route of N27 south of Hillside Avenue to Roosevelt Field and Hempstead. Midday trips would also operate into 60 Charles Lindbergh.; Formerly continued to Hempstead with select rush hour trips to Mineola. Mineola became the full-time terminus on March 30, 2014.; Starting on September 1, 2024 some weekday trips during middays would end in Roslyn and start at the Americana Mall; these trips bypass Roslyn LIRR station and the Clock Tower. However, these trips were eliminated as of January 6, 2025.
n24	Replaced New York and Long Island Traction Company "Mineola-Jamaica" line on April 5, 1926.; Operated by Schenck Transportation until 1973 MSBA takeover.; A new branch started running on April 8, 2012, with buses operating from Mineola to Hicksville via Old Country Road, replacing the n78 and n79. Peak trips alternated between operating to Hicksville and East Meadow. East Meadow service would only operate in the peak, with service midday running every 30 minutes to Hicksville. Service to 60 Charles Lindbergh was eliminated. Peak service was reduced to run every 15 minutes instead of every 10 minutes.; Effective January 7, 2024, all service splits at Roosevelt Field in both directions, except for weekend early a.m. and late p.m. trips which terminate at Roosevelt Field.; Effective September 1, 2024, some trips on weekends began starting and ending in Bellerose near Elmont-UBS Arena LIRR station.
n25 (n25/58)	Operated by Schenck Transportation until 1973 MSBA takeover.; Peak service was increased to run every 15 minutes effective September 3, 2023.; Effective January 5, 2025, the n25 was merged with the n58 to form a route that serves Lynbrook, Great Neck and the Merchant Marine Academy in Kings Point. All n58 trips running via Kings Point Road to Kings Point Pond have been replaced by the n57.; On May 25, 2025, the n25/58 was split back into two separate routes on weekdays, on weekends the route remains merged.
n26	Operated by Schenck Transportation until 1973 MSBA takeover.; Was a branch of the n22, referred to as the N22 Quad, until September 5, 1989. The route did not yet serve Great Neck, terminating at North Shore University Hospital.; On September 8, 2025, n26 service became partially limited in Queens. Buses make these Queens stops: Jamaica Bus Terminal, 170th Street, 179th/182nd Street, 187th/188th Street, 205th Street, 212th Street/Hollis Court Boulevard, Springfield Boulevard, Winchester Boulevard.
n27	Operated by Schenck Transportation until 1973 MSBA takeover.; Glen Street portion replaced portion of "Glen Cove Railroad" trolley line.; Starting April 8, 2012, midday, night, and weekend service was cut back from Hempstead to the Roslyn LIRR station. Service was extended to Roosevelt Field during middays and for some weekday evening trips effective June 24, 2012.; On March 30, 2014, the southern terminal of most trips was changed from Roosevelt Field to Hempstead Terminal, with stops made at 60 Charles Lindbergh.; Weekend service was eliminated on April 9, 2017, and weekday service was reduced to run every 60 minutes.; Service to Hempstead was increased by three trips effective September 3, 2023 to increase service during parts of the day to every 30 minutes.; On September 7, 2025, daytime alternate service between Hempstead and Roosevelt Field started with the n16. The n27 also no longer directly serves the Roslyn LIRR station.; On February 1, 2026, the n27 was rerouted to serve East Gate Boulevard when entering and exiting Roosevelt Field Mall and now makes stops by Whole Foods and HomeGoods.
n31	Operated by Nassau Bus Line, a subsidiary of Schenck Transportation, until 1973 MSBA takeover.; On May 2, 2021, the western terminal of the route was changed to Plainview Avenue and Beach 20th Street. The stop at Seagirt Boulevard and Crest Road was discontinued.; On January 6, 2025, all n31 Far Rockaway-bound trips beginning in Lynbrook have been replaced by the n31X along with one additional Saturday morning trip.
n31X	New express route introduced by NICE on May 26, 2024, on a pilot basis.; On September 1, 2024, a new express stop at the Mercy Medical Center was added.; On January 6, 2025, the Mercy Medical Community Shuttle has been combined with the n31X making limited stops along its original route, with the route no longer serving the terminal at Rockville Centre LIRR Station. All n31 and n32 southbound trips beginning in Lynbrook have been replaced by the n31X along with one additional Saturday morning trip.; PM service expanded on September 13, 2026.
n32	Operated by Nassau Bus Line, a subsidiary of Schenck Transportation, until 1973 MSBA takeover.; On May 2, 2021, the western terminal of the route was changed to Plainview Avenue and Beach 20th Street. The stop at Seagirt Boulevard and Crest Road was discontinued.; On January 6, 2025, all n32 Far Rockaway-bound trips beginning in Lynbrook have been replaced by the n31X along with one additional Saturday morning trip.
n33	Operated by Nassau Bus Line, a subsidiary of Schenck Transportation, until 1973 MSBA takeover.; Sunday service was eliminated on April 9, 2017.; Service was increased to run every 30 to 35 minutes on May 22, 2022.; On May 26, 2024, this route was converted into a loop route, with the Far Rockaway stop becoming a regular stop.; On February 1, 2026, the n33 was converted back from being a loop route with Far Rockaway as the terminal stop.
n35	Operated by Hempstead Bus Corporation until 1973 MSBA takeover as two separate routes.; The route was merged with the former N37 (Hempstead-Baldwin) route on April 26, 2009, to improve north–south service. All stops on both routes except in Westbury were served by the new N35.; On January 7, 2024, some trips start or end at Roosevelt Field instead of Baldwin or Westbury.
n40 (/n41)	Replaced New York and Long Island Traction Company "Mineola-Brooklyn" line on April 5, 1926.; Operated by Hempstead Bus Corporation until 1973 MSBA takeover.; n40/41 became a combined route in late 2018, as a result of n43 service being rerouted to Babylon Turnpike, making the n41 redundant.; On January 5, 2025, the n40/41 was split with the n41 only operating between Freeport and Hempstead during overnights along North Main Street.; Added stop at Westbury Memorial Library on September 13, 2026.
n40X	New route introduced by NICE on January 6, 2025 on a pilot basis, between the Freeport LIRR station and Roslyn LIRR station, bypassing the Mineola Intermodal Center.; On May 25, 2025, the n40X no longer serves the Hempstead Transit Center and makes an express stop near the terminal at Franklin Street and Columbia Street.; Service between Mineola and Roslyn was discontinued on September 7, 2025, and all buses had their northern terminus shifted to the Mineola Intermodal Center.; On May 18, 2026, the n40X has been extended to Baldwin Harbor and makes express stops along Atlantic Avenue, the route follows the former n36 routing. The n40X will make a new stop at Henry Street underneath the Freeport LIRR station.
n41	Replaced New York and Long Island Traction Company "Mineola-Brooklyn" line on April 5, 1926.; Operated by Hempstead Bus Corporation until 1973 MSBA takeover.; n40/41 became a combined route in late 2018, as a result of n43 service being rerouted to Babylon Turnpike, making the n41 redundant.; On January 5, 2025, the n40/41 was split with the n41 only operating between Freeport and Hempstead during overnights along North Main Street.
n43	New route introduced by Long Island Bus in 2003.; Service was extended on weekdays to Hempstead on April 8, 2012. In addition, on that date, midday and Saturday service began operating every 30 minutes instead of every 45 minutes. The Hempstead extension was eliminated for the summer on June 22, 2012, but was restored on September 4, 2012. This service was discontinued on June 21, 2013.; Rerouted from North Main Street to Babylon Turnpike while the n41 was combined with the n40 to form the n40/41.; Effective September 7, 2025, southbound n43 trips no longer use Charles Lindbergh Boulevard and instead use the Nassau Community College parking lot to get to Earl Ovington Boulevard.; Extended to Commercial Avenue in Garden City on September 13, 2026.
n43X	New route introduced by NICE on May 18, 2026 on a pilot basis.; The route serves Roosevelt Field Mall, Westbury Gallery along East Gate Boulevard and Freeport LIRR station following the n40's routing maxing express stops, the n43X does not currently serve Nassau Community College.; Rerouted and stops added northbound on Charles Lindbergh Boulevard and southbound on West Road in Uniondale on September 13, 2026.
n48	Operated by Hempstead Bus Corporation until 1973 MSBA takeover.; Saturday service was discontinued on April 8, 2012.; Weekday-only service between Broadway Mall and Jericho Quad was discontinued on April 9, 2017.
n49	Operated by Hempstead Bus Corporation until 1973 MSBA takeover.; Saturday service was increased to operate every 40 minutes instead of every 60 minutes on April 8, 2012.; Weekday-only service between Broadway Mall and Jericho Quad was discontinued on April 9, 2017.
n54	Jerusalem Avenue Bus Line began operations in late 1920s.; Taken over by the MSBA in 1973.; Service between Sunrise Mall and Amityville was discontinued on April 9, 2017.; Service between Sunrise Mall and Amityville was reinstated on May 22, 2022.; On May 25, 2025, the stop at Sunrise Mall was discontinued.
n55	Jerusalem Avenue Bus Line began operations in late 1920s.; Taken over by the MSBA in 1973.; Extended to Amityville on April 9, 2012.; Monday to Saturday service between Sunrise Mall and Amityville was discontinued on April 9, 2017.; Service between Sunrise Mall and Amityville was reinstated on May 22, 2022.; Starting on January 6, 2025, the first two weekday morning Amityville-bound trips began at Jerusalem Avenue and George Road in North Bellmore.; On May 25, 2025, the stop at Sunrise Mall was discontinued.
n57	Operated by Universal Auto Bus, a subsidiary of Schenck Transportation, until 1973 MSBA takeover.; Effective January 6, 2025, the n57 now has service during the middays with trips running clockwise before noon and trips running counter-clockwise after noon. The n57 has been extended to serve Redhook Road and replaced the former n58 service along Kings Point Road.
n58 (n25/58)	Operated by Universal Auto Bus, a subsidiary of Schenck Transportation, until 1973 MSBA takeover.; Peak service was increased to run every 15 minutes effective September 3, 2023.; On January 5, 2025, the n58 was merged with the n25 to form a direct line that serves Lynbrook, Great Neck and the Merchant Marine Academy in Kings Point. All n58 trips running via Kings Point Road to the pond have been replaced by the n57.; On May 25, 2025, the n25/58 was split back into two separate routes on weekdays, on weekends the route remains merged.
n70	New route introduced by MSBA in 1982.; Originally operated to Newsday in Melville, truncated to SUNY Farmingdale on April 9, 2017.; Weekend service replacing n72 trips started on September 3, 2023.; On May 26, 2024, service was increased to every 15 to 20 minutes due to n71 service being discontinued to Hempstead.
n71	Operated by Stage Coach Lines until 1973 MSBA takeover.; On September 3, 2023, weekend service was revised to operate as a shuttle between Farmingdale State College and Amityville LIRR Station.; On May 26, 2024, service to Hempstead was discontinued and replaced by increased n70 service, with all trips following the shuttle service pattern.; On September 7, 2025, the Sunrise Mall stop was discontinued. The n71's routing was streamlined, with a stop at Carmans Road and Louden Street replacing the previous stop at the mall.
n72	Operated by Stage Coach Lines until 1973 MSBA takeover.; On April 8, 2012, midday service to Babylon was reduced, with service operating every 60 minutes instead of every 30 minutes.; Originally operated to Babylon station, truncated to Farmingdale on April 9, 2017.; Weekend trips replaced by n70 on September 3, 2023.; On January 7, 2024, service was temporarily discontinued and replaced by the n70.
n78	Operated by Stage Coach Lines until 1973 MSBA takeover.; Was a branch of the n79 until September 5, 1989.; Service between Mineola and Hicksville was discontinued on April 8, 2012, and replaced by the n24. Midday n78 service was discontinued.
n79	Operated by Stage Coach Lines until 1973 MSBA takeover.; Service between Mineola and Hicksville was discontinued on April 8, 2012, and replaced by the n24.
n80	Route eliminated on January 17, 2016 but was restored on June 26, 2016, along with the n81.; Service was reduced to run every 60 minutes on April 9, 2017.; On September 1, 2024, service to Sunrise Mall was discontinued and has been rerouted to serve Merrick Road, Unqua Road and Sunrise Highway, replacing the n19 between Hicksville Road and Unqua Road. Service now runs every 30 minutes during weekday rush hours.
n88X	Originally JB62, then the JB88.; Extension to Hempstead Transit Center started on June 26, 2021.; Relabeled from n88 for the 2023 season. Service in the 2023 season extended through October 1, 2023.; On May 23, 2025, Jones Beach became a regular stop, making the n88X a loop route. The route also no longer serves Hempstead Transit Center.; On May 17, 2026, the n88X went back to being a north and south route and will no longer stop at the East Bathhouse.
Elmont Flexi	Equivalent of former n2 service.; Started operation by NICE on September 6, 2016.; Service to Hewlett was added on June 17, 2024.
Mercy Medical Comm. Shuttle	Equivalent of former n17 service.; Started operation by NICE on June 26, 2016.; On January 6, 2025, the Mercy Medical Community Shuttle was combined with the n31X making limited stops along its original route, and no longer served the terminal at Rockville Centre LIRR Station.
Port Wash. Shuttle	Started operation by NICE on January 21, 2019 as the Shore Road Shuttle. Later renamed to the Port Washington Shuttle.; Port Washington North service added on May 28, 2019.

==== Discontinued services ====
Note that discontinued services pre-NICE takeover are prefixed with an uppercase "N".

Route	Terminals		Major streets	Notes/History
n2	Floral Park	Green Acres Mall		Peak direction service to/from Jamaica was discontinued on June 27, 2010.; On April 8, 2012, service was combined with the n8 to operate in a loop, with the terminal for both routes being at Covert Avenue and Tulip Avenue. n2 buses, instead of turning around at Green Acres Mall, service would then run along the route of the n8 along Hook Creek Boulevard, Elmont Road, and Dutch Boulevard, before heading back onto the n2's route along Covert Avenue.; On December 30, 2012, n2 and n8 service along Covert Avenue between Tulip Avenue and Hempstead Turnpike was discontinued, with service now terminating at Hempstead Turnpike and Franklin Avenue. This change was reversed on June 23, 2013.; The route was discontinued on January 17, 2016.; Restored as the Elmont FLEXI Shuttle on September 6, 2016.
N3	Franklin Square; Hempstead Turnpike/Franklin Avenue Jamaica, Queens; 165th Street Bus Terminal	Green Acres Mall		Discontinued on June 27, 2010.; Jamaica was served rush hours only in the peak direction.
N5	Jamaica Center, Queens	Grant Park		Route discontinued.
N7	Green Acres Mall	Freeport		Saturdays only; Was replaced by Saturday service on the n4.; Discontinued on January 4, 1975.
n8	Floral Park	Green Acres Mall		Original north terminal was Franklin Square; New route introduced by Long Island Bus in 2003.; On April 8, 2012, service was combined with the n2 to operate in a loop. Buses would now operate along the northern section of the n2 along Covert Avenue and Meacham Avenue between Tulip Avenue and Dutch Broadway, before resuming their former route along Dutch Broadway, Elmont Road, and Hook Creek Boulevard to Green Acres Mall. Instead of terminating there, buses would continue along the route of the former n2 to Tulip Avenue and Covert Avenue. Service along the n8 route between Hempstead Turnpike and Franklin Avenue and Dutch Broadway and Meacham Avenue was discontinued. Buses would start at Covert Avenue, run along Dutch Broadway and Hook Crook Boulevard to Green Acres Mall, and then continue along the route of the n2 back to Covert Avenue. Service was discontinued along Franklin Avenue.; On December 30, 2012, n2 and n8 service along Covert Avenue between Tulip Avenue and Hempstead Turnpike was discontinued, with service now terminating at Hempstead Turnpike and Franklin Avenue. This change was reversed on June 23, 2013.; Route discontinued on January 17, 2016.
n14 (RCCS)	Rockville Centre shuttle loop			Route discontinued on January 17, 2016.; The route was restored as the Rockville Community Shuttle on June 26, 2016.; Shuttle discontinued on April 9, 2017.
N16A	Hempstead Transit Center	Rockville Centre		Renumbered to N17.
n16J	Jamaica LIRR station	Nassau Community College		Started as a pilot route in 2019, but was discontinued in 2020 due to the COVID-19 pandemic.; Service solely during the AM and NCC-bound only.
n16NCC	Hempstead Transit Center	Nassau Community College		Route created in 2018, but was discontinued in 2020 due to the COVID-19 pandemic.; Replaced by extra n16 and n16X trips
n16X	Hempstead Transit Center	Nassau Community College		New express route introduced by NICE in March 2013. It was later discontinued in favor of n6X trips to Nassau Community College.; Restored in 2017 to replace the same n6X trips to Nassau Community College.; On September 1, 2024, the n16X was made to operate in both directions to Hempstead Transit Center and Nassau Community College, with the route no longer serving the Endo loop.; Replaced by n16C in 2025.
n17 (MMCS)	Hempstead Transit Center	Rockville Centre		Service began operating on April 8, 2012, to restore service to Mercy Medical Center.; On June 24, 2012, buses began making local stops along Randall Avenue and Centre Avenue in Rockville Centre, and between Mercy Hospital and Hempstead.; Route discontinued on January 17, 2016.; Route restored as the Mercy Medical Community Shuttle on June 26, 2016.; Merged with the n31X (now n31X/MMS) on January 6, 2025.
n20	Flushing, Queens; Roosevelt Avenue/Main Street	Hicksville LIRR Station		Still fully active, split into n20G and n20H on January 17, 2016.
n20L	Flushing, Queens; Roosevelt Avenue/Main Street	Hicksville LIRR Station		Route discontinued on January 17, 2016, when the n20 was split into the n20G and n20H.; Bypassed Great Neck LIRR Station and Roslyn.
n22A	Jamaica, Queens; 165th Street Bus Terminal	Roosevelt Field		Route discontinued on April 9, 2017.
N22B	Jamaica, Queens; 165th Street Bus Terminal	Hicksville LIRR Station		See also n22L, n22X
n22L	Jamaica, Queens; 165th Street Bus Terminal	Hicksville; Hillside Avenue/John Street		Service began on January 1, 2012.; On April 8, 2012, service no longer operated along Old Country Road and Mineola Boulevard to speed up service.; Route discontinued on January 12, 2014.; The route bypassed Roosevelt Field.
N28	Roslyn North Industrial Park	Roslyn LIRR station		Roslyn Industrial Park shuttle; Route discontinued on June 27, 2010.
N29	Destinations unknown			Route discontinued in the 1970s
N32C	Lynbrook; Atlantic Avenue/Merrick Road	Far Rockaway, Queens; Beach 20 Street/Seagirt Boulevard		Replaced by n31 Lynbrook short trips
N32W	Lynbrook; Atlantic Avenue/Merrick Road	Far Rockaway, Queens; Beach 20 Street/Seagirt Boulevard		Replaced by n32 Lynbrook short trips
n36	Lynbrook LIRR station	Freeport LIRR station		Replaced New York and Long Island Traction Company "Brooklyn-Freeport" line on April 5, 1926; Was Hempstead Bus Corp at 1973 MSBA takeover.; Originally operated as a loop from the Hempstead Transit Center serving South Hempstead, Rockville Centre, Oceanside, East Rockaway, Lynbrook, and West Hempstead; Originally bidirectional, but later it only ran in the counterclockwise direction; Discontinued on April 9, 2017.
N37 (first use)	Hicksville LIRR Station	East Meadow; Prospect Avenue/Hempstead Turnpike		Route renumbered to N41 (first use)
N37 (second use)	Hempstead Transit Center	Hempstead Transit Center		Route merged with the N38 to form the N38A and N38B
N37 (third use)	Hempstead Transit Center	Baldwin Harbor; Atlantic Avenue/Grand Avenue		The route was merged with the N35 on April 26, 2009, to improve north–south service. All stops on both routes except in Westbury were served by the new N35.
N38	Hempstead Transit Center	East Meadow; Prospect Avenue/Hempstead Turnpike		Route merged with the (second) N37 to form the N38A and N38B
N38A	Hempstead Transit Center	Hempstead Transit Center		Operated counterclockwise; Replaced by the n46 and n47 in 1982
N38B	Hempstead Transit Center	Hempstead Transit Center		Operated clockwise; Replaced by the n46 and n47 in 1982
N39	Hempstead Transit Center	Hicksville LIRR Station		Renumbered to N39C
N39A	Hempstead Transit Center	Hicksville LIRR Station		Renumbered to N39D
N39C	Hempstead Transit Center	Hicksville LIRR Station		Renumbered to n49
N39D	Hempstead Transit Center	Hicksville LIRR Station		Merged to form the n48
N39DD	Hempstead Transit Center	Hicksville LIRR Station		Merged to form the n48
N40B	Mineola Intermodal Terminal	Freeport LIRR Station		Route renumbered to n41 by September 1977
N41 (first use)	Hicksville LIRR Station	East Meadow; Prospect Avenue/Hempstead Turnpike		Route merged with the n49
n45	Roosevelt Field Mall	Bellmore		Hempstead Bus Corp at 1973 MSBA takeover.; Service was made peak only, and Saturday service was discontinued on April 8, 2012.; On September 1, 2013, the path of n45 and n51 through Nassau Community College was revised to make all stops in and around the campus.; Discontinued on April 9, 2017.
N46 (first use)	Westbury; Post Avenue/Northern State Parkway	Baldwin LIRR Station		Route replaced by the n16, the n35, and the former N37
n46 (second use)	Hempstead Transit Center	Bellmore		Route introduced in 1982; Discontinued on January 17, 2016.
N47 (first use)	Hempstead Transit Center	Rockville Centre LIRR Station		Route replaced by the N16A, later the n17
n47 (second use)	Hempstead Transit Center	North Bellmore; North Jerusalem Road/Newbridge Road		Route introduced in 1982; Discontinued on April 9, 2017.
n50	Hicksville LIRR Station	Bellmore		Route discontinued on January 17, 2016.
n51	Roosevelt Field	Merrick		Saturday service was discontinued on April 8, 2012.; On September 1, 2013, the path of n45 and n51 through Nassau Community College was revised to make all stops in and around the campus.; Discontinued on January 17, 2016.; Restored on September 6, 2016; Discontinued on April 9, 2017.
N51A	Merrick LIRR Station			Loop service north of the LIRR station.; Replaced by the N52 and N53.
N51B	Merrick LIRR Station			Loop service south of the LIRR station; Replaced by the N52 and N53.
N52 (first use)	Hempstead Transit Center	Seaford; Washington Avenue/Merrick Road		Replaced by new routes n54 and n55.
N52A	Hempstead Transit Center	Seaford; Washington Avenue/Merrick Road		Replaced by rerouted N52.
N52B	Hempstead Transit Center	Amityville LIRR Station		Replaced part of the N52; Replaced by new routes n54 and n55.
N52 (second use)	Merrick LIRR shuttle loop			Route introduced on November 12, 2002.; Minibus service.; Route combined with the N53 on June 25, 2007.
N53 (first use)	Massapequa Park LIRR shuttle loop			Replaced by new routes n54 and n55.
N53 (second use)	Merrick LIRR shuttle loop			Route introduced on November 12, 2002.; Minibus service.; Route discontinued on June 27, 2010.
N56	Great Neck; Polo Road/Arrandale Avenue	Great Neck LIRR Station		Merged into the n57
N57A	Kings Point; East Shore Road/Middle Neck Road	Great Neck LIRR Station		Renumbered to N57 by September 1977
N57B	Great Neck; Polo Road/Arrandale Avenue	Great Neck LIRR Station		Renumbered to N56 by September 1977
N57C	Kings Point; Kings Point Road/Eagle Point Drive	Great Neck LIRR Station		Most of the route is now operated by the n57 and the n58
N59A	Mineola Intermodal Center	Great Neck LIRR Station		Most of the route is now operated by the n57 and the n58
N60	Kings Point; Kings Point Road/Eagle Point Drive	Manhasset; Hospital Complex		Most of the route is now operated by the n25 and the n58
N62 (Industrial Park Loop)	Freeport LIRR Station			Very short loop just east of the Freeport LIRR Station and south of Merrick Road
n62 (FCS)	Freeport shuttle loops			Service was made peak only on April 8, 2012.; The route was discontinued on January 17, 2016.; Route was restored as the Freeport Community Shuttle on September 6, 2016.; The shuttle was discontinued on April 9, 2017.
N63	Long Beach; East Broadway/?	Long Beach; West Beech Street/?		The route was manipulated a few times and has evolved into Long Beach Bus' East and West Loops
N64	Farmingdale; Republic Airport	Amityville LIRR Station		Discontinued.
N64A	South Huntington; Walt Whitman Shops	Amityville LIRR Station		Discontinued.
N65	East Rockaway; Main Street/Denton Avenue	Uniondale; Kellenberg Memorial High School and Sacred Heart High School		School days only; Routes discontinued on June 27, 2010
N66	East Rockaway; Main Street/Denton Avenue	Mineola; Chaminade High School		School days only; Routes discontinued on June 27, 2010
N67 (first use)	Glen Cove; Glen Street LIRR Station	Oyster Bay; West Main Street/South Street		Former Hendrickson Bus Corporation route.; Weekdays only.; Discontinued on January 4, 1975.
N67 (second use)	Roosevelt	Hicksville; Holy Trinity Diocesan High School		School days only.; Route discontinued on June 27, 2010.
N69	Long Beach	Point Lookout		See Point Lookout route above.
n72	Hempstead Transit Center	Farmingdale; Republic Airport		Temporarily replaced by n70 service on January 7, 2024. (See above for history)
N72B	Hempstead Transit Center	Farmingdale; Republic Airport		Replaced by new route n71 and extension of route N82 on September 4, 1977.
N72C	Hempstead Transit Center	Levittown	Center Lane	Replaced by new route n74.
N72F	Hempstead Transit Center	Farmingdale; Republic Airport		Discontinued.
N72G	Hempstead Transit Center	Farmingdale	Gardiners Avenue	Replaced by new route n74.
n73 (HWCS) n74	Hicksville LIRR Station	Wantagh		Service was reduced on April 8, 2012. Peak service on the combined route began operating every 40 minutes instead of every 30 minutes, n73 midday service began operating every 60 minutes, and midday n74 service was discontinued.; Routes discontinued on January 17, 2016.; n73 restored as the Hicksville Wantagh Community Shuttle on September 6, 2016.; The shuttle was discontinued on April 9, 2017.
n75	Hempstead Transit Center	Uniondale	Peninsula Boulevard, Hempstead Turnpike	New route introduced on January 3, 2023 by NICE on a pilot basis.; Served Hempstead High School and Kellenberg Memorial High School during weekday rush hours.; Service in a.m. toward Hempstead only, service in p.m. in both directions.; Discontinued on May 28, 2023.
N77	Glen Street LIRR Station	Hempstead Transit Center		Merged to form the n27.
N78 (first use)	Glen Cove; Landing Road (Morgan Memorial Park)	Sea Cliff LIRR Station		Merged to form the n27.
N79A	Hicksville LIRR Station	Plainview or Hicksville		Replaced by new routes N78, N79, and N94.
N79B	Hicksville LIRR Station			Replaced by new routes N79 and N94.
n79X	Hicksville LIRR Station	Walt Whitman Mall	Woodbury Road, Jericho Turnpike	New express route introduced by NICE on September 1, 2024, on a pilot basis.; Route operated non-stop along Woodbury Road between Hicksville LIRR and Jericho Turnpike, it made all local stops between Woodbury Road and Walt Whitman Mall along Jericho Turnpike.; Route discontinued on May 25, 2025 due to low ridership.
N80 (first use)	Jericho; Brush Hollow Road/Jericho Turnpike	Bellmore LIRR Station		Renumbered to n45.
N80A	Hicksville LIRR Station	East Massapequa; Sunrise Mall		Renumbered to n80/n81.
N81 (first use)	Syosset LIRR Station	Bellmore LIRR Station		Merged into the N82.
n81 (second use)	Westfield Sunrise	Hicksville LIRR station		Discontinued (with the n80) on January 17, 2016.; Restored (with the n80) on June 26, 2016.; Service was discontinued on April 9, 2017.
N82	Bellmore LIRR Station	Hicksville		Originally a loop through Bellmore, East Meadow, and Merrick; Gradually reworked into a Bellmore to Hicksville route; Merged into the N50.
N83	Hicksville LIRR Station	Massapequa Park; Unqua Road/Sunrise Highway?		Partially merged into the n80.
N84	Plainview; Old Country Road/Newtown Road	Massapequa Park; Unqua Road/Sunrise Highway?		Discontinued.
N85	South Huntington; Walt Whitman Shops	Massapequa Park; Unqua Road/Sunrise Highway?		Discontinued.
N86				Loop through Plainedge and Massapequa. First/last stop might be North Broadway and Boundary Avenue?; Discontinued.
N87 (first use)	Oyster Bay; West Main Street	Massapequa Park; Unqua Road/Sunrise Highway?		Discontinued.
n87 (second use)	Hicksville LIRR Station	Jones Beach State Park		Summer service only; Discontinued by MTA after 2009 season.; Revived by NICE in 2013; Operated via Freeport in 2014 and was discontinued again at the end of the season.; See also JB50 below.
N88 (first use)	Hempstead; Transit Center	South Huntington; Walt Whitman Shops		Discontinued.
n88 (second use)	Freeport	Jones Beach		Still active, relabeled to n88X after the 2022 season.; See also JB62 below.
N90	Westbury; The Source Mall	Hempstead Transit Center		Hempstead-Nassau Hub Shuttle; Late night bus run, discontinued on January 5, 2003
N91	JFK Airport	Hempstead Transit Center	Merrick Road, Hook Creek Boulevard, North Conduit Boulevard, North Boundary Road	Service, nicknamed "JFK Flyer"", began operating on September 9, 1996 between the Rockville Centre LIRR station and JFK Airport, with 24 round-trips.; The service's 18-month demonstration period ended in March 1998. 160 riders a day used the route, which was lower than forecasted. The pilot was funded through the New York State Department of Transportation's State Innovative Mobility Demonstration (IMD) Program. LI Bus had requested additional funding to either continue the existing service or extend it to the Hempstead Transit Center. The route was extended to Hempstead on January 24, 1999, with buses running non-stop from there to Rockville Centre. At this point, there were 32 round-trips.; The route was discontinued on January 5, 2003 due to low ridership.
N92 (TransPort Shuttle)	Port Washington LIRR station	Port Washington Loop	South Bayles Avenue, Willowdale Avenue, Port Washington Boulevard, Lowell Road, Guilford Road, Crestwood Road, Plymouth Road, Elm Street, Orchard Farm Road, Beacon Hill Road, Main Street (Port Washington)	Service commenced on November 30, 1992, as a community pilot made in partnership between the MTA and the Town of North Hempstead, to resolve parking issues at the Port Washington LIRR station.; Service operated only during weekday AM and PM rush-hours, with 25-minute headways.; Except for a stop on South Bayles Avenue serving the Port Washington LIRR station, the remainder of the route only made stops on-demand.; Discontinuation date unknown; may not have had a formal route number.; Route restored as the Port Washington Shuttle in January 2019.
N93	Nassau Hub shuttle loop			Route discontinued on June 27, 2010.; Only minimal service ran after January 5, 2003.
N94	Hicksville LIRR station	Syosset; Crossways and Gateways Office Parks		Route discontinued on June 27, 2010.
N95	Farmingdale LIRR station	Melville; Newsday building		Route discontinued on June 27, 2010.
N98	Destinations unknown			Discontinued around the late 1980s
N100	Massapequa LIRR Station	Babylon		Discontinued.
N101	Farmingdale LIRR Station	Copiague		Discontinued.
N111	Jamaica, Queens; Parsons Boulevard/Hillside Avenue	Far Rockaway, Queens; Beach 20 Street/Seagirt Boulevard		Renumbered to N113.
N111A	Jamaica, Queens; Parsons Boulevard/Hillside Avenue	Cedarhurst; Peninsula Boulevard/Rockaway Turnpike		Replaced by the Q111.
N113	Jamaica, Queens; Parsons Boulevard/Hillside Avenue	Far Rockaway, Queens; Beach 20 Street/Seagirt Boulevard		Replaced by the Q113 and the Q114.
JB21	Flushing, Queens	Jones Beach State Park		Discontinued in the 1970s-1980s
JB22	Jamaica, Queens; 165th Street Bus Terminal	Jones Beach State Park		Discontinued in the 1970s-1980s; Operated via Jamaica Estates
JB24	Jamaica, Queens; 165th Street Bus Terminal	Jones Beach State Park		Route discontinued in late 1990s.; Operated via Hollis
JB37	Hicksville LIRR station	Jones Beach State Park		Discontinued in the 1970s-1980s
JB49	Hicksville LIRR station	Jones Beach State Park	Newbridge Road	Discontinued in the 1970s-1980s
JB50 / JB87	Hicksville LIRR station	Jones Beach State Park		Originally JB50.; Relabeled to JB87, then N87 and n87.; Route discontinued in 2014.
JB51	Uniondale	Jones Beach State Park		Discontinued in the 1970s-1980s
JB53	Farmingdale, Suffolk County	Jones Beach State Park		Discontinued in the 1970s-1980s
JB57	Great Neck	Jones Beach State Park		Discontinued in the 1970s-1980s
JB62 / JB88	Freeport LIRR station	Jones Beach State Park		Originally JB62.; Relabeled to JB88, later n88, and currently running as n88X operated by NICE.
JB73	Wantagh	Jones Beach State Park		Discontinued in the 1970s-1980s
JB80	Hicksville LIRR station	Jones Beach State Park	Hicksville Road	Discontinued in the 1970s-1980s

Note about the former Jones Beach routes: the original JB routes (except JB87 and JB88) were numbered from the local “N”-labeled route (see above) which each Jones Beach-bound route followed starting its run.

=== City of Long Beach ===
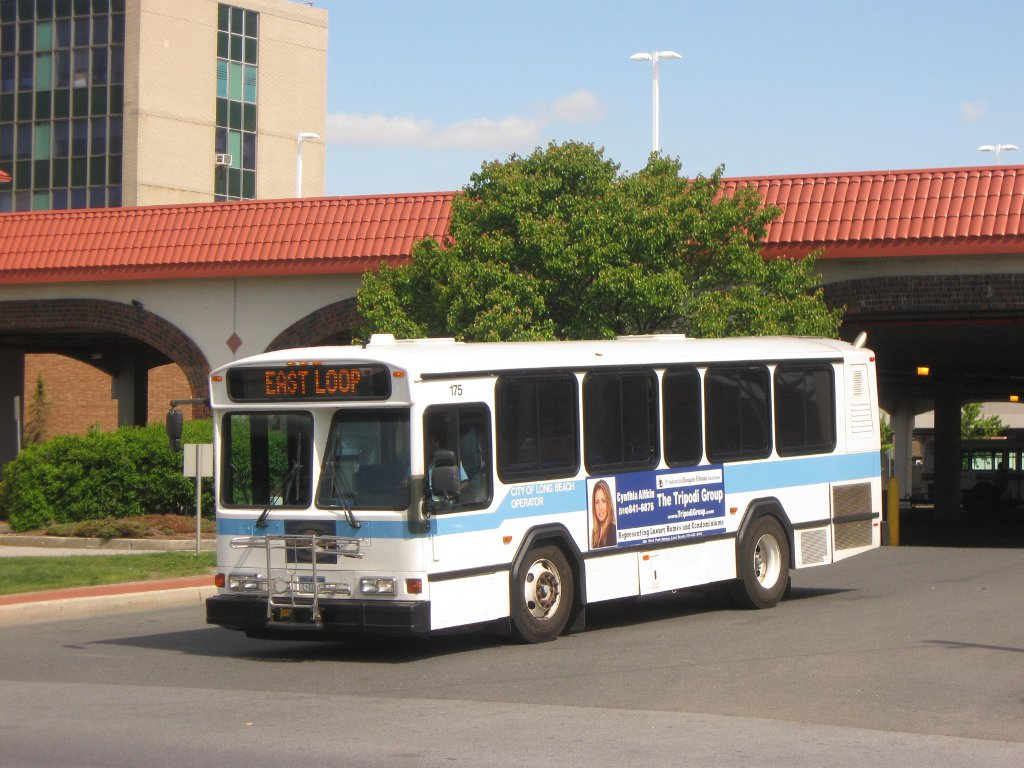
An East Loop bus leaving Long Beach station

The City of Long Beach operates five bus routes within the City and to Point Lookout, all originating from the Long Beach LIRR station. The fare is $2.25 except on the Point Lookout route, which has a $2.75 fare, and payable in cash (coins and $1 bills) only. OMNY is not accepted.

The East Loop & West Loop were once operated by the Long Beach Railway company as trolley lines.

Service is available at all times except early Monday morning.

Route	Terminal	Major streets	Notes/History
East Loop	Maple Boulevard and East Broadway	Edwards Boulevard, Broadway, Maple Boulevard, East Park Avenue	Counter-clockwise loop.
West End	West Beech Street and Nevada Avenue	West Park Avenue, West Beech Street	
Shoppers'; Special	Maple Boulevard and East Broadway	East Park Avenue, Maple Boulevard, Broadway, Edwards Boulevard	Weekday middays only; Clockwise loop. Reverse of East Loop route.
Point; Lookout	Point Lookout	Lido Boulevard	Weekday rush hour service only.; Branch Bus Corp at 1973 MSBA takeover, transferred to Long Beach in 1984.; Formerly N69
Late Night; Express	Bus runs via West End route first, then via the East Loop route.	West Beech Street, Nevada Avenue, Edwards Boulevard, Broadway, Maple Boulevard, Park Avenue	Overnight service.; No late night Sunday/early Monday morning service.

=== City of Glen Cove ===
In addition to being served by the n21 and n27 bus routes, the City of Glen Cove also operates two weekday services.

- Commuter bus to Glen Cove industrial park (one a.m. trip).
- Loop bus via Landing Road, Forest Avenue, Sea Cliff Avenue, and Glen Cove Avenue (four trips).

=== Village of North Hills ===
The Village of North Hills operates a free shuttle bus service between Village Hall and the Manhasset LIRR station for village residents; operates during weekday rush hours only.

== See also ==
- List of bus routes in Suffolk County, New York
