= Inwood station =

Inwood station may refer to:

- Inwood station (LIRR)
- Inwood–207th Street (IND Eighth Avenue Line)
- Inwood station (New York Central Railroad)
- Inwood station (Pennsylvania Railroad)
