= Cedarhurst station =

Long Island Rail Road station in Nassau County, New York

Cedarhurst
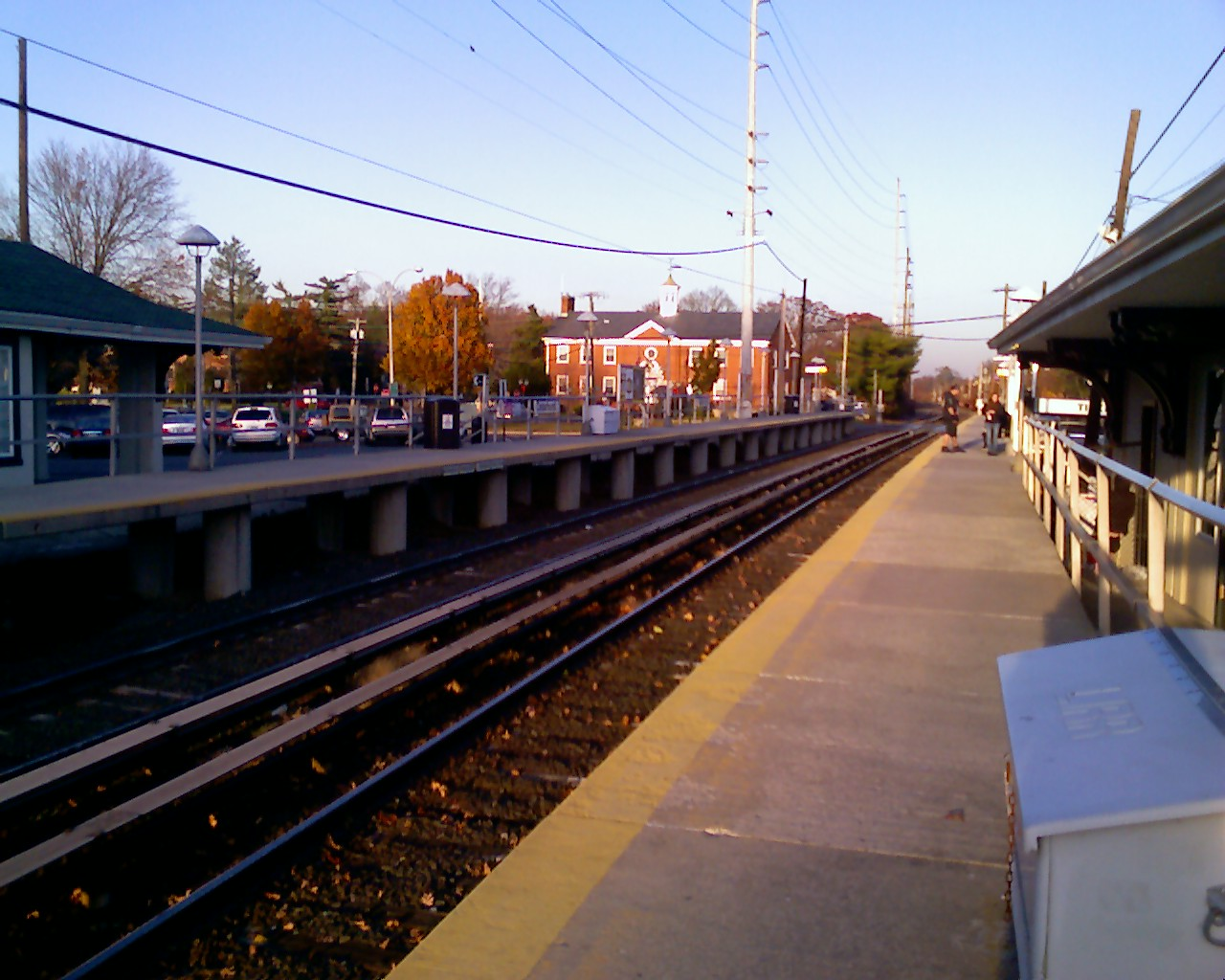
- The Cedarhurst LIRR station, looking east

General information
- Location: Cedarhurst Avenue and Chestnut Street (2 blocks west of Broadway); Cedarhurst, New York
- Coordinates: 40.622214°N 73.726121°W
- Owner: Long Island Rail Road
- Line: Far Rockaway Branch
- Platforms: 2 side platforms
- Tracks: 2
- Connections: Nassau Inter-County Express: n32

Construction
- Parking: Yes
- Cycle facilities: Yes
- Accessible: Yes

Other information
- Station code: CHT
- Fare zone: 4

History
- Opened: 1869 (SSRRLI)
- Rebuilt: 1872, 1913
- Electrified: December 11, 1905; 750 V (DC) third rail

Passengers
- 2012—2014: 1,453 per weekday

Services
Preceding station	Long Island Rail Road	Following station
Woodmere toward Penn Station or Grand Central	Far Rockaway Branch	Lawrence toward Far Rockaway
Former services
Preceding station	Long Island Rail Road	Following station
Woodmere toward Valley Stream	Far Rockaway Branch	Lawrence toward Hammels
Woodmere toward Gibson	Rockaway Beach Division	Lawrence toward Woodside
Location

Cedarhurst is a station on the Long Island Rail Road's Far Rockaway Branch in Cedarhurst, in Nassau County, New York, United States. The station is located at Cedarhurst Avenue and Chestnut Street, one block west of Central Avenue.

== History ==
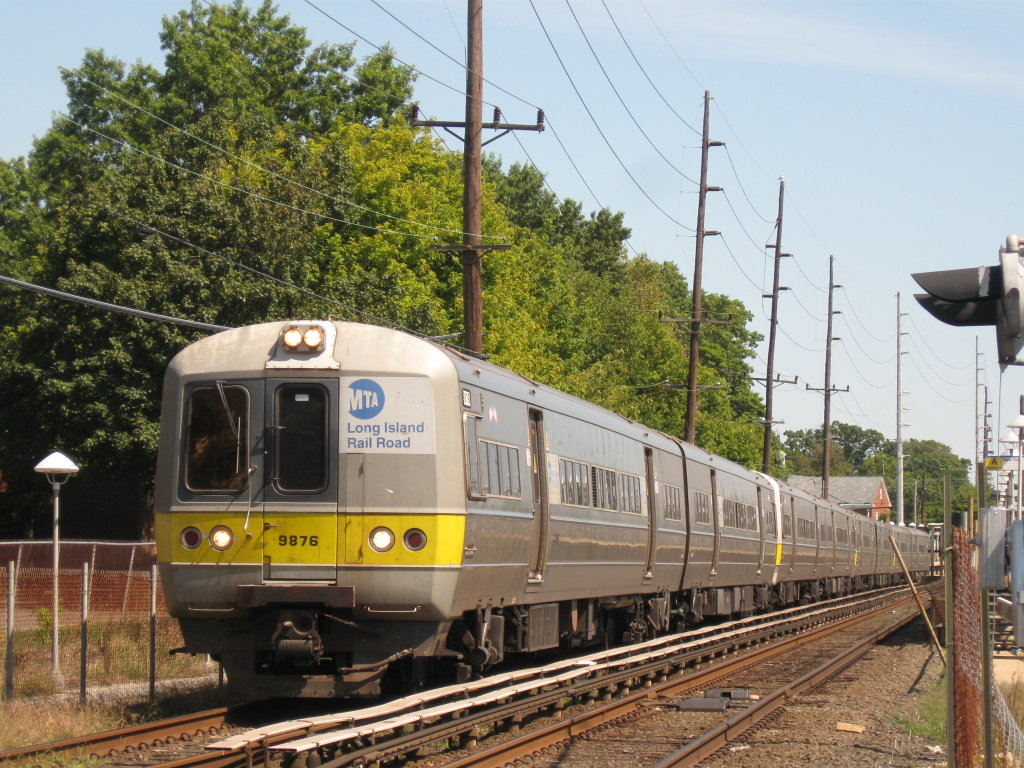
A Far Rockaway-bound train departs Cedarhurst station.

Cedarhurst station was originally built by the South Side Railroad of Long Island in July 1869. Three years later, the rival Long Island Rail Road also built its own "Ocean Point Depot" in July 1872 for the former Cedarhurst Cut-Off just northeast of Cedarhurst station After the LIRR acquired the South Side Railroad, both the Ocean Point Depot and the LIRR's depot were abandoned in June 1876. The LIRR's old station was moved to Far Rockaway in August 1881, while the SSRRLI's Ocean Point Depot re-opened in June 1887, then was greatly re-modeled in May 1888. A third Cedarhurst station was built in 1913.

== Station layout ==
This station has two high-level side platforms, each 10 cars long.
