= Baldwin station =

Long Island Rail Road station in Nassau County, New York

Baldwin
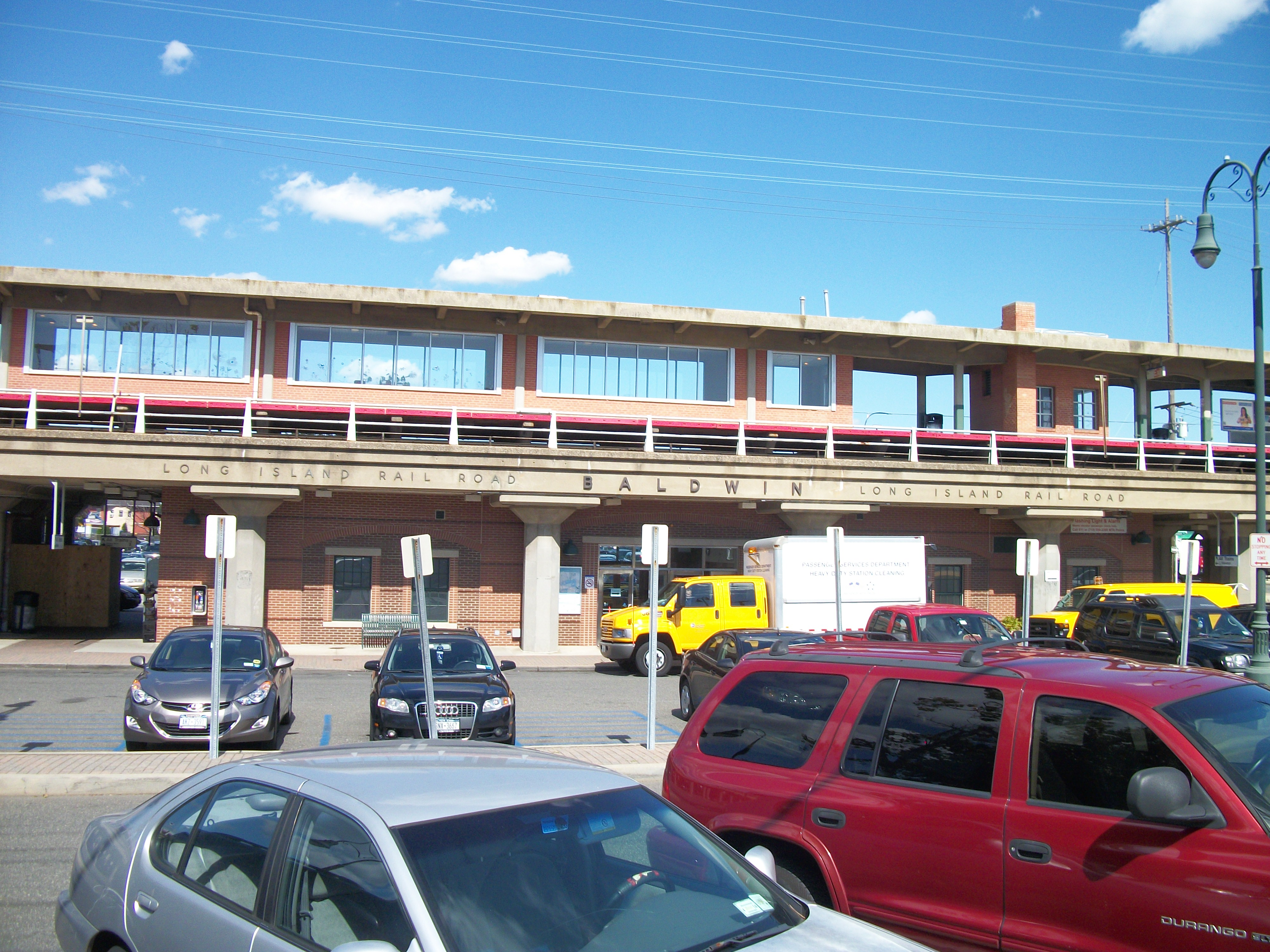
- Baldwin station, as seen from Sunrise Highway

General information
- Location: Sunrise Highway and Grand Avenue; Baldwin, New York
- Coordinates: 40.656746°N 73.607444°W
- Owner: Long Island Rail Road
- Line: Montauk Branch
- Distance: 21.2 mi (34.1 km) from Long Island City
- Platforms: 1 island platform
- Tracks: 2
- Connections: Nassau Inter-County Express: n35

Construction
- Parking: Yes
- Cycle facilities: Yes
- Accessible: yes

Other information
- Station code: BWN
- Fare zone: 7

History
- Opened: 1867; 159 years ago (SSRRLI)
- Rebuilt: 1881, 1917, 1957
- Electrified: May 20, 1925; 750 V (DC) third rail
- Former names: Baldwinsville (1867–1892); Millburn (1892–1897)

Passengers
- 2012—2014: 6,928
- Rank: 17 of 125

Services
Preceding station	Long Island Rail Road	Following station
Rockville Centre toward Penn Station, Grand Central or Atlantic Terminal	Babylon Branch	Freeport toward Babylon
Montauk Branch does not stop here
Former services
Preceding station	Long Island Rail Road	Following station
Rockville Centre toward Long Island City	Montauk Division	Freeport toward Montauk
Location

Baldwin is a station on the Babylon Branch of the Long Island Rail Road. It is officially located on Sunrise Highway (NY 27) and Grand Avenue (CR 55) in Baldwin, Nassau County, New York, although it also includes Milburn and Brooklyn Avenues.

== History ==
Baldwin station was originally built in February 1868 by the South Side Railroad of Long Island, though trains had already been stopping there, then called Baldwinsville, since October 28, 1867. The station was remodeled in May 1881, and was raised in 1917, and a second station opened later that year, on December 28.

As part of the grade crossing elimination project taking place along the Babylon Branch during the mid-20th century, the second Baldwin station was razed in November 1957. It was officially replaced with the current elevated structure on October 2, 1957, after the last ground level train passed through at 12:18 pm that afternoon.

The Baldwin Civic Association commissioned a mural of Nunley's carousel by artist Michael White, which was installed at the Baldwin station on April 22, 2019.

== Station layout ==
The station has one 12-car-long high-level island platform between the two tracks. The platform includes an extension over the Grand Avenue bridge between the two tracks that is covered with a gabled roof.

== See also ==
- List of Long Island Rail Road stations
