= Rosa Parks Hempstead Transit Center =

Transportation center in Hempstead, Nassau County, New York

Hempstead
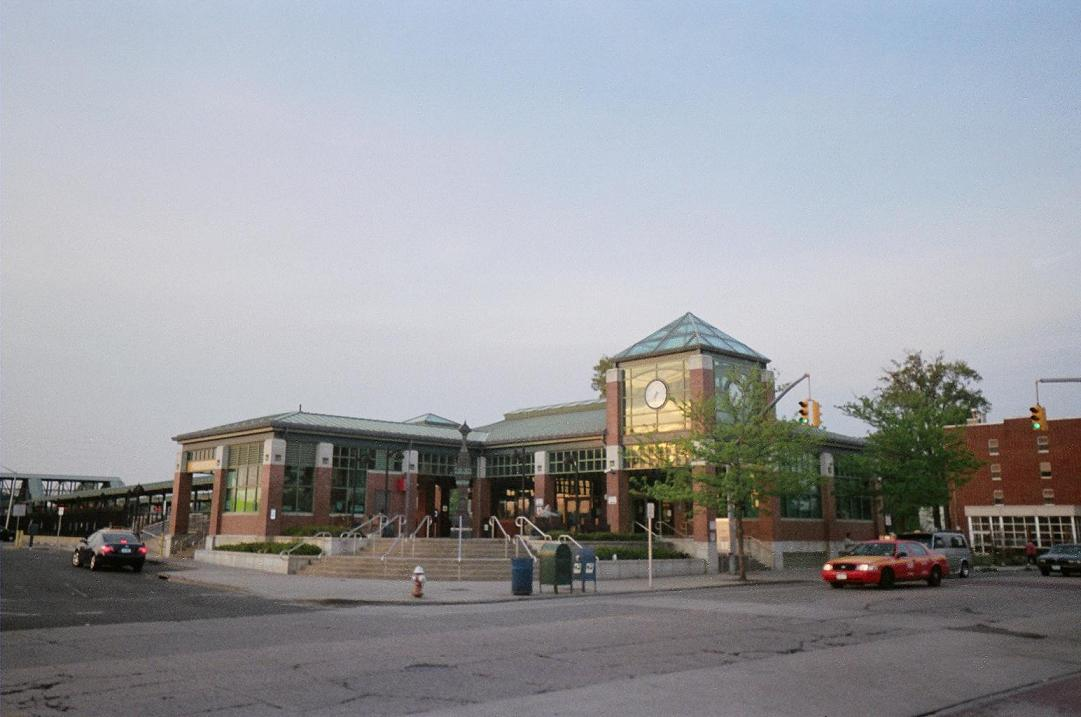
- The LIRR terminal at the Rosa Parks Hempstead Transit Center in 2008

General information
- Location: West Columbia Street; Hempstead, New York
- Coordinates: 40.7131°N 73.6253°W
- Owner: Long Island Rail Road (train station); County of Nassau (bus station); Village of Hempstead (parking fields)
- Line: Hempstead Branch
- Distance: 19.8 mi (31.9 km) from Long Island City
- Platforms: Rail terminal: 2 island platforms; Bus terminal: 24 bays
- Tracks: 8
- Connections: Nassau Inter-County Express: See below Greyhound Lines

Construction
- Parking: Yes
- Cycle facilities: Yes
- Accessible: Yes

Other information
- Station code: HEM
- Fare zone: 4

History
- Opened: 1872 (rail), 1993 (bus)
- Rebuilt: 1881, 1913, 1943 (moved), 1963, 2002
- Electrified: May 26, 1908; 750 V (DC) third rail

Passengers
- 2012—2014: 2,367 per weekday

Services
Preceding station	Long Island Rail Road	Following station
Country Life Press toward Penn Station, Grand Central or Atlantic Terminal	Hempstead Branch	Terminus
Location

The Rosa Parks Hempstead Transit Center is an intermodal center and transportation hub in Hempstead, New York. It contains the Nassau Inter-County Express bus system's indoor customer facility between Jackson and West Columbia Streets – as well as the terminus for the Hempstead Branch of the Long Island Rail Road, located right across West Columbia Street from the bus terminal.

Serving 17 routes, the bus terminal is a major transfer point for customers using a second Nassau Inter-County Express route or the LIRR. It offers a waiting area, transit information, a newsstand which also sells OMNY cards, and restrooms.

== History ==
=== Rail terminal ===
The Hempstead Long Island Railroad station was originally built as a Central Railroad of Long Island depot sometime between October and December 1872, on the corner of Main Street and Fulton Avenue. When the Long Island Rail Road acquired the CRRLI in 1878, this Hempstead Station and terminus came with it, replacing the former 1839-built Hempstead Station, which ran along the original Hempstead Branch, and was located on Main Street and Centre Street.

The station was remodeled in July 1881, and razed in 1913. A second brick station was built in February 1913, which was designed to have trains terminate behind the building rather than alongside of it. This was due to an accident from January 1912 involving a milk train that rear-ended a stationary passenger car, sending it across Fulton Avenue and crashing into a building across the street and resulting in two deaths. Between December 30, 1941 and 1943, service was suspended when the tracks were cut back and the station was moved to Columbia Street. A temporary station was installed 1,265 feet (386 m) west of its former location until work on this project was finished. Upon the completion of this move and track work, the second station reopened. The station was gutted in a fire on December 31, 1962 and remodeled in April 1963. This station was razed in 1998 and replaced with a much more elaborate, modern third depot, which was built between 1999 and 2002.

=== Bus terminal ===
In 1993, construction on the Hempstead Transit Center was completed, replacing an earlier one. In conjunction with the new railroad station, its construction was part of a plan by Mayor James A. Garner to redevelop Hempstead and help bring it back to prominence as "Long Island's hub." The original Hempstead bus terminal was located across Jackson Street on the corner of Jackson and Main streets. That area is now occupied by the Greyhound bus stop and various businesses. The new transit center can accommodate many more buses than the original terminal and allows almost half of the Nassau Inter-County Express (formerly MTA Long Island Bus) system's routes to run through Hempstead.

=== Renaming for Rosa Parks ===
On February 14, 2006, Thomas R. Suozzi, then the County Executive of Nassau County, announced that Hempstead Transit Center would be renamed in honor of civil rights pioneer Rosa Parks. At the dedication, Suozzi said, "To honor her memory and that of her important work, today we are renaming this vital transit hub for one of the most important figures in American history."

In addition to the renaming of the terminal, a permanent exhibit of the civil rights movement will be constructed, telling the story of the struggle for equality through the photographs of photojournalists and artists who covered the unrest of that era, including the late Moneta Sleet Jr., Jim Peppler, and Herbert Randall. A column in the back of the bus terminal has been renovated with black marble, engraved with a large image of Rosa Parks and her story.

== Station layout ==
This station has two high-level island platforms, each eight cars long. The Hempstead Branch has eight tracks at this location. The four tracks to the east of – but not adjacent to – the platforms are used for train storage.

== Bus connections ==
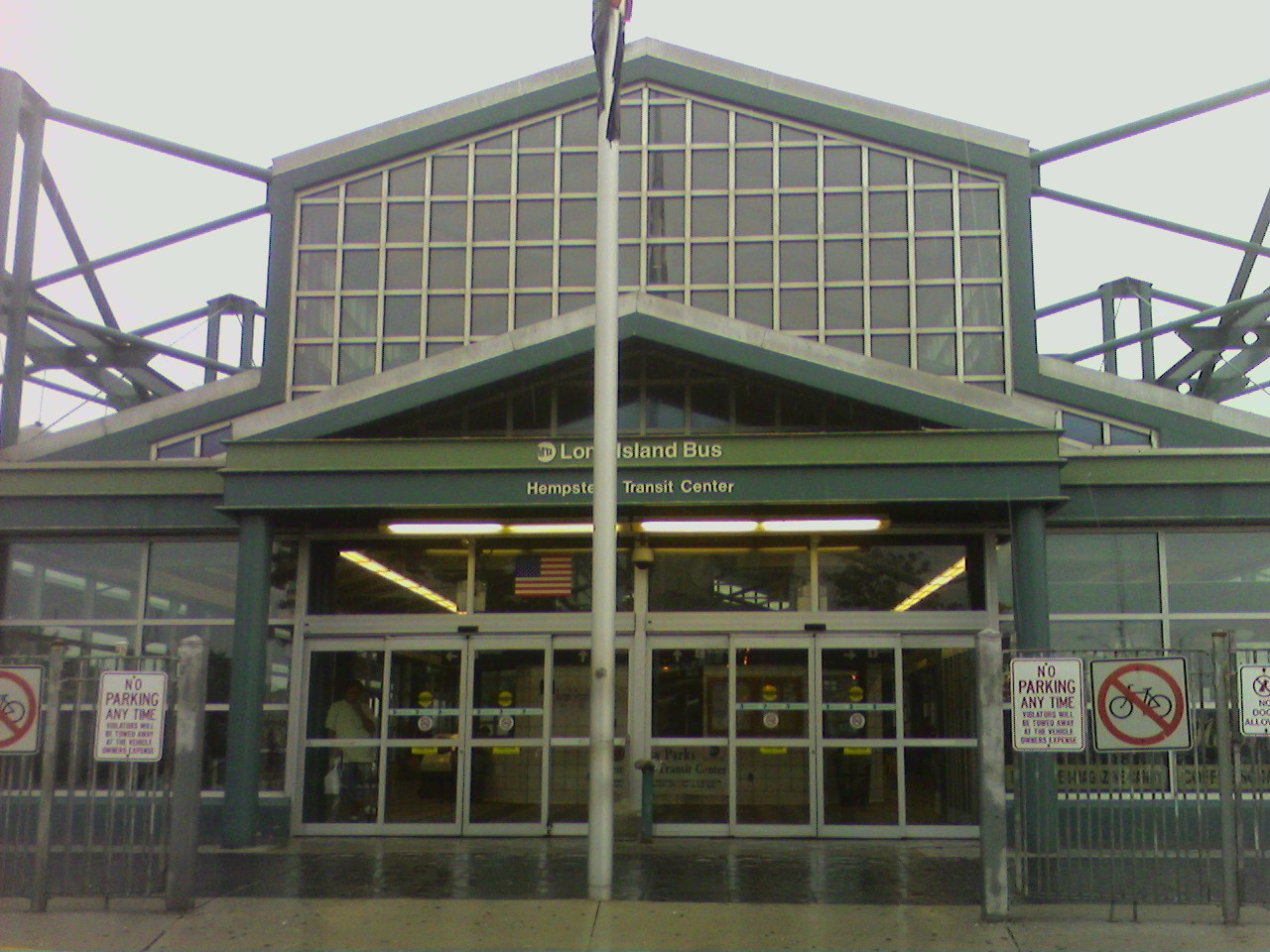
The Rosa Parks Hempstead Transit Center's bus terminal in 2007

There are 19 routes that serve the Hempstead Transit Center, those being the n6, n6X, n15, n16, n16C, n27, n31, n31X/MMCS, n32, n35, n40, n40X, n41, n48, n49, n54, n55, and n70. n6X and n40X trips stop outside at Jackson Avenue. Departure assignments during the day are listed below, during late night hours when the terminal is closed, all buses stop on West Columbia Street at Station Plaza immediately north of the terminal.

Bay #	Route	Terminus	Service notes
1	n31, n31X/MMCS, n32	Far Rockaway	n31 does not operate on Sundays.; n31X/MMCS only runs during weekday rush hours.
2	n31, n31X/MMCS, n32	Far Rockaway	n31 does not operate on Sundays.; n31X/MMCS only runs during weekday rush hours.
3	n15	Long Beach	
4	n40, n41	Freeport	n41 only operates overnights between Hempstead and Freeport.
5	n40, n41	Freeport	n41 only operates overnights between Hempstead and Freeport.
6	n16, n16C	Rockville Centre	Weekday service only.
7	n35	Baldwin	
8	n6	Jamaica, Queens	Operates 24/7.; Local service.; Express service and trips operating using articulated buses stop outside the terminal on Jackson Avenue.
9	n6	Jamaica, Queens	Operates 24/7.; Local service.; Express service and trips operating using articulated buses stop outside the terminal on Jackson Avenue.
10	n6	Jamaica, Queens	Operates 24/7.; Local service.; Express service and trips operating using articulated buses stop outside the terminal on Jackson Avenue.
11	Unused		
12	n40	Mineola	
13	n40	Mineola	
14	Unused		
15	n16C, n16	Nassau Community College	Weekday service only.
15	n16C, n16	Nassau Community College	Weekday service only.
16	n16C	Nassau Community College	Weekday service only.
16	n35	Roosevelt Field Mall; Westbury	
17	n15	Roosevelt Field Mall; Mineola	Some weekday peak trips operate via County Seat Drive and end at Mineola.
18	n54	Amityville	No Sunday service.
18	n55	Amityville	
19	n70	Farmingdale State College	Some trips may use articulated bus and stop outside the terminal on Jackson Avenue.
20	n70	Farmingdale State College	Some trips may use articulated bus and stop outside the terminal on Jackson Avenue.
21	n70	Farmingdale State College	Some trips may use articulated bus and stop outside the terminal on Jackson Avenue.
22	n48	Hicksville; Broadway Mall	No Sunday service.
23	n49	Hicksville; Broadway Mall	
24	n27	Glen Cove	n27 weekday service only.

== Gallery ==
Hempstead Rosa Parks Transit Center

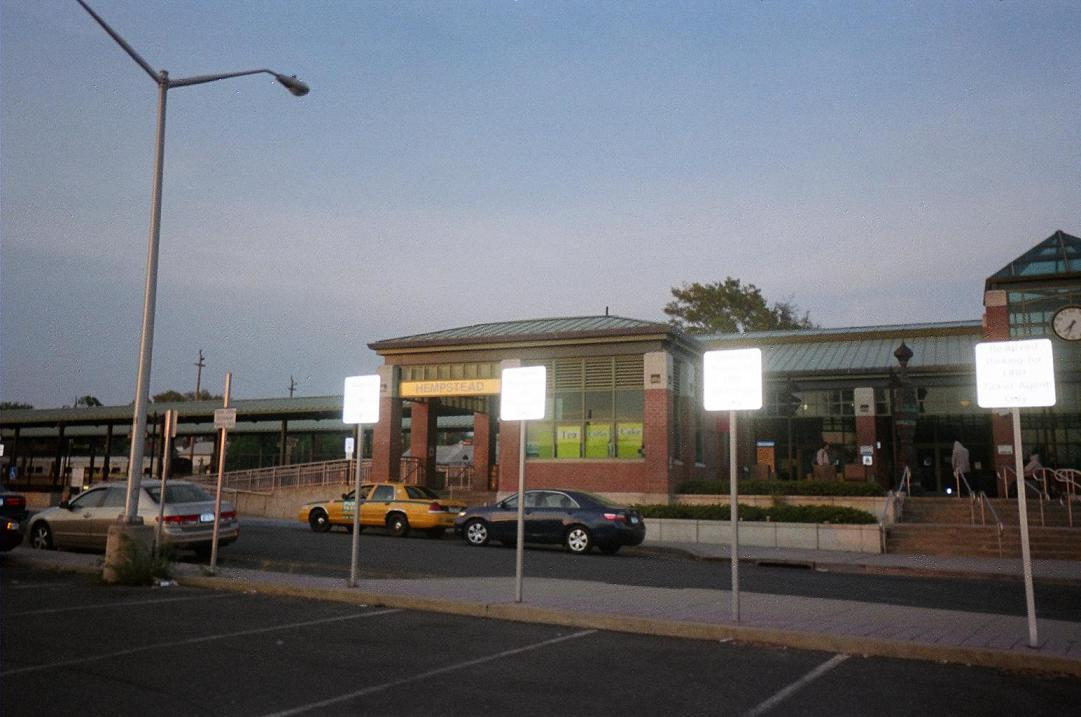
West side of the station

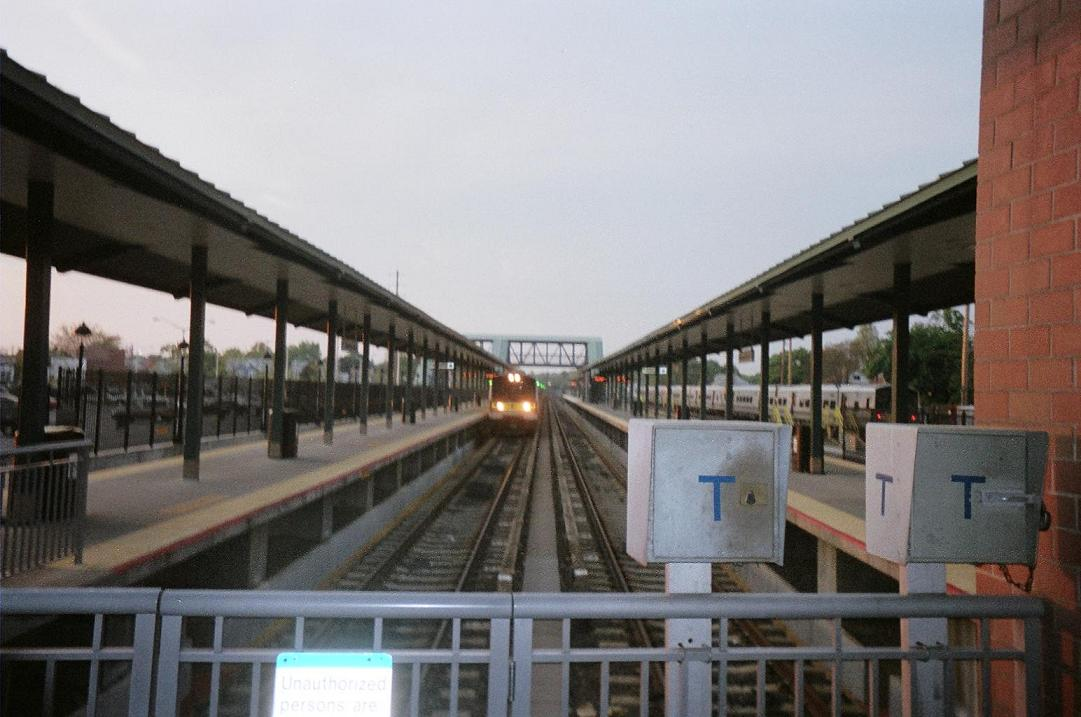
A train arrives at the station

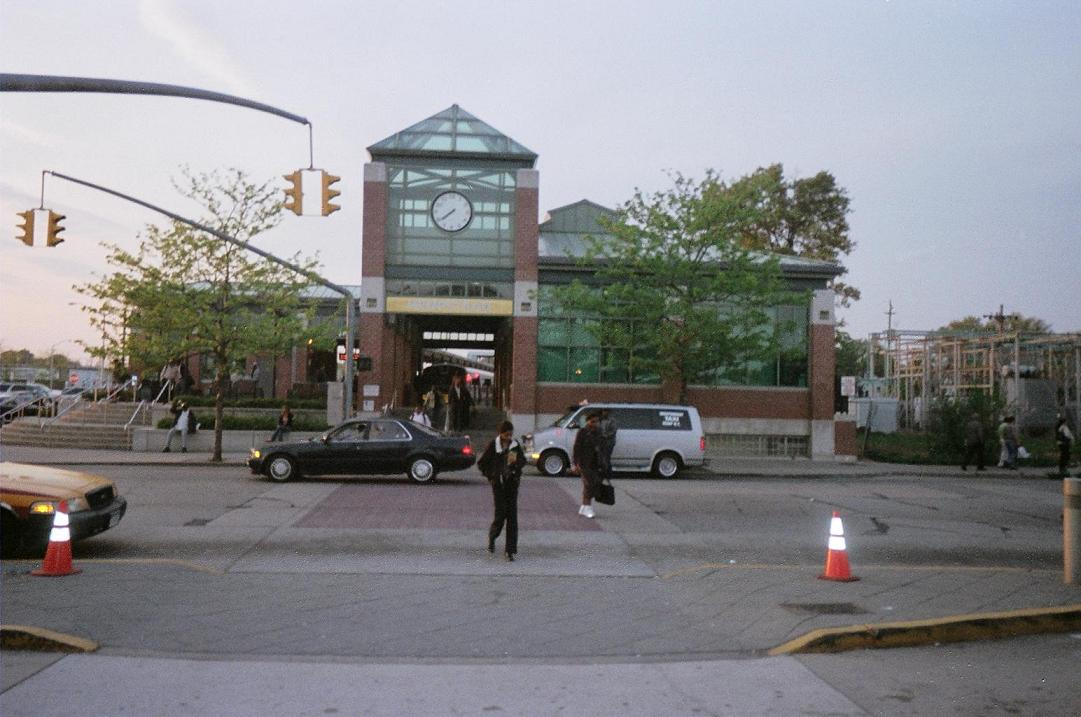
Commuters transfer from train to bus

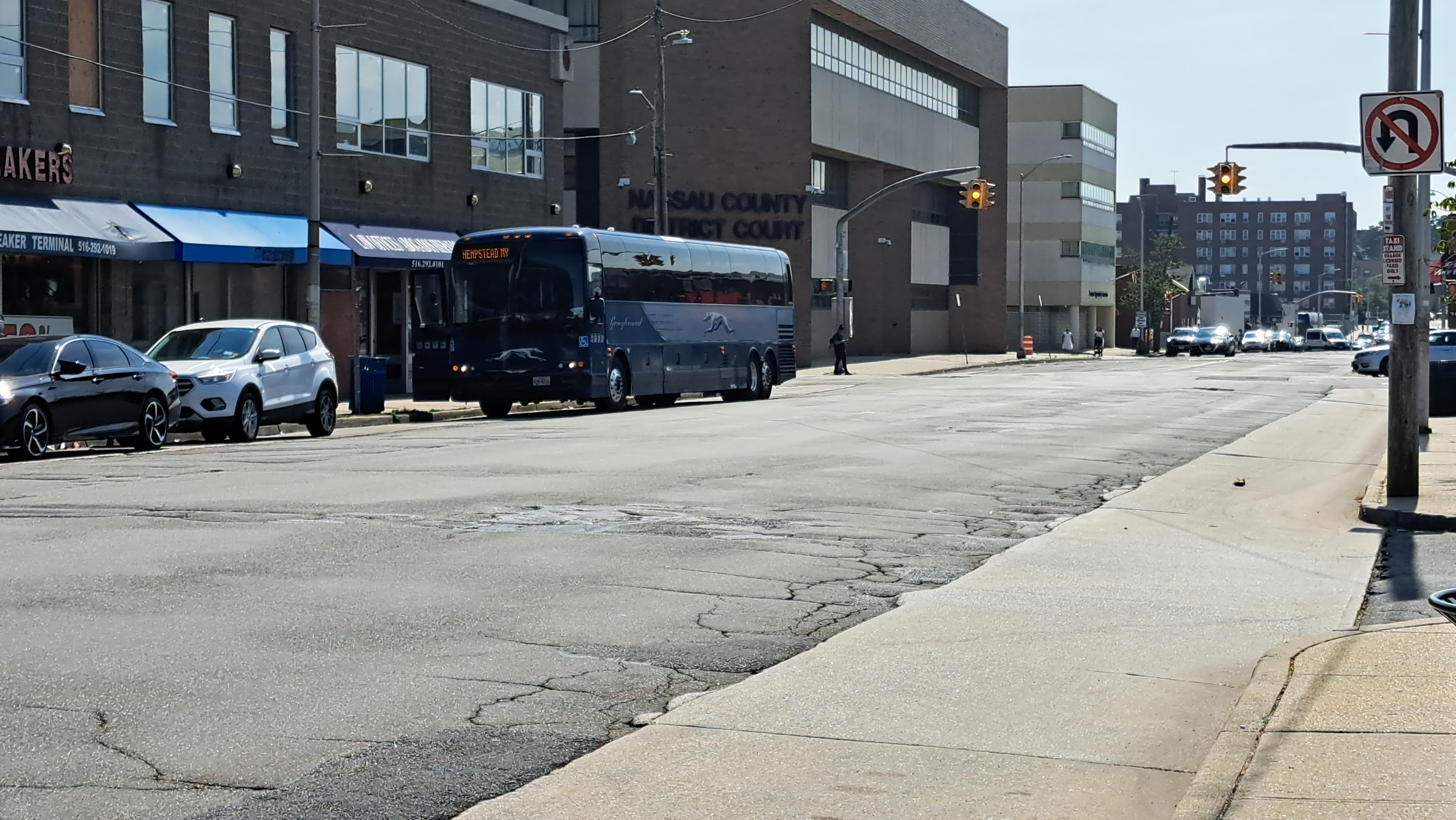
Greyhound Bus stopping outside the terminal

== See also ==
- List of Long Island Rail Road stations
- Mineola station (LIRR)
- Ronkonkoma station
- West Hempstead station
