= Lawrence station (LIRR) =

Long Island Rail Road station in Nassau County, New York

Lawrence
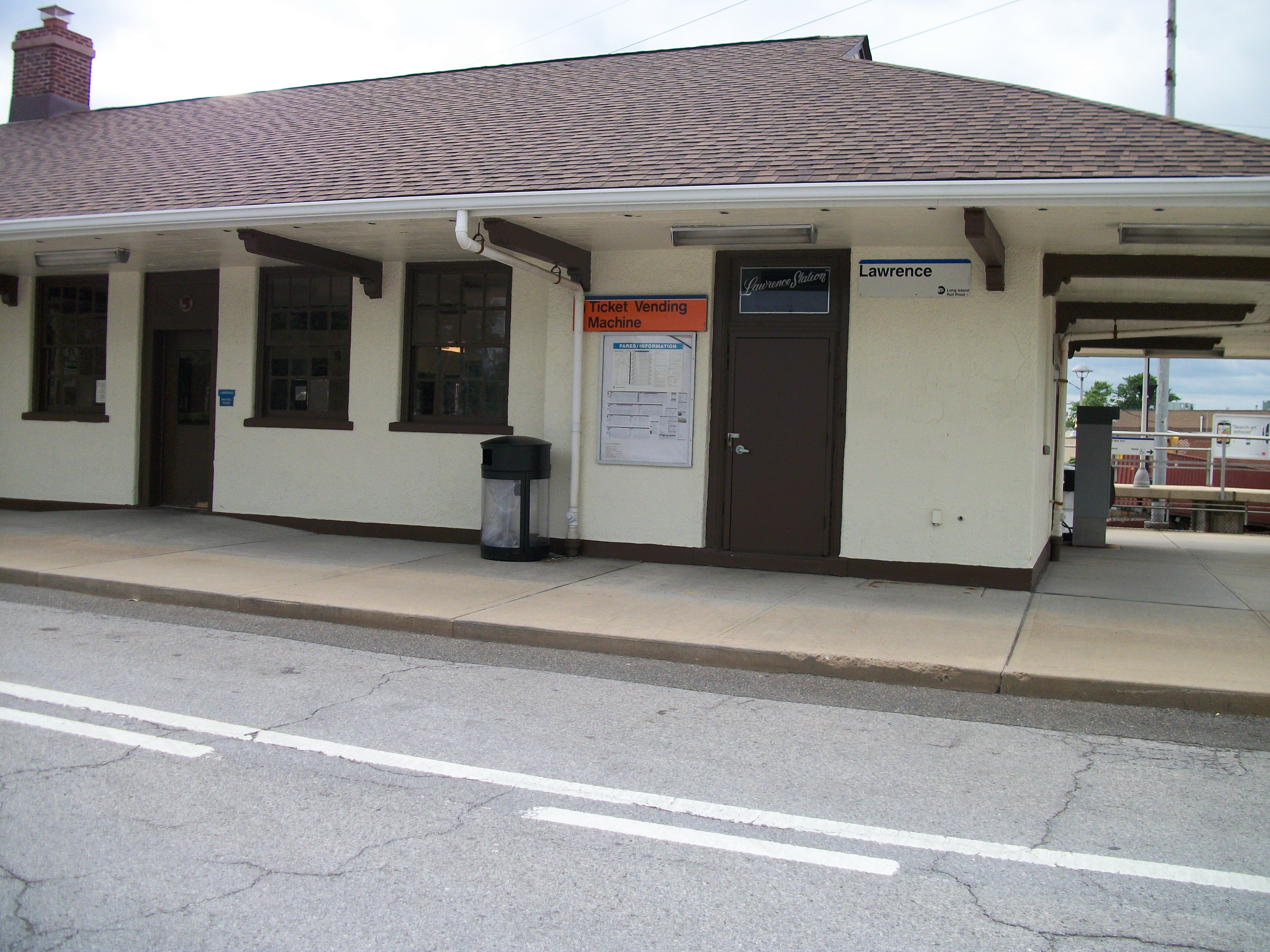
- Parking lot view of Lawrence station. Note the stenciled glass above one of the doorways.

General information
- Location: Lawrence Avenue and Bayview Avenue (2 blocks west of Central Avenue); Lawrence, New York
- Coordinates: 40.615638°N 73.736050°W
- Owner: Long Island Rail Road
- Line: Far Rockaway Branch
- Platforms: 2 side platforms
- Tracks: 2
- Connections: MTA Bus: Q114; Nassau Inter-County Express: n31, n31x, n32

Construction
- Parking: Yes
- Accessible: Yes

Other information
- Station code: LCE
- Fare zone: 4

History
- Opened: July 29, 1869 (SSRRLI)
- Rebuilt: 1905
- Electrified: December 11, 1905; 750 V (DC) third rail

Passengers
- 2012—2014: 726 per weekday

Services
Preceding station	Long Island Rail Road	Following station
Cedarhurst toward Penn Station or Grand Central	Far Rockaway Branch	Inwood toward Far Rockaway
Former services
Preceding station	Long Island Rail Road	Following station
Cedarhurst toward Valley Stream	Far Rockaway Branch	Inwood toward Hammels
Cedarhurst toward Gibson	Rockaway Beach Division	Inwood toward Woodside
Location

Lawrence is a station on the Long Island Rail Road's Far Rockaway Branch in the Village of Lawrence, in Nassau County, New York, United States.

The station is officially located at Lawrence Avenue and Bayview Avenue, two blocks west of Central Avenue. However, the actual location is two blocks north of Central Avenue, and Bayview Avenue is on the opposite side of the tracks. Lawrence station is 21.8 miles (35.1 km) from Penn Station in Midtown Manhattan.

== History ==
Lawrence station was originally built by the South Side Railroad of Long Island on July 29, 1869, but never had a station building until June 29, 1872. The station was rebuilt in 1905, the same year that the line was electrified, and the original station house was moved to a private location on July 31, 1906.

== Station layout ==
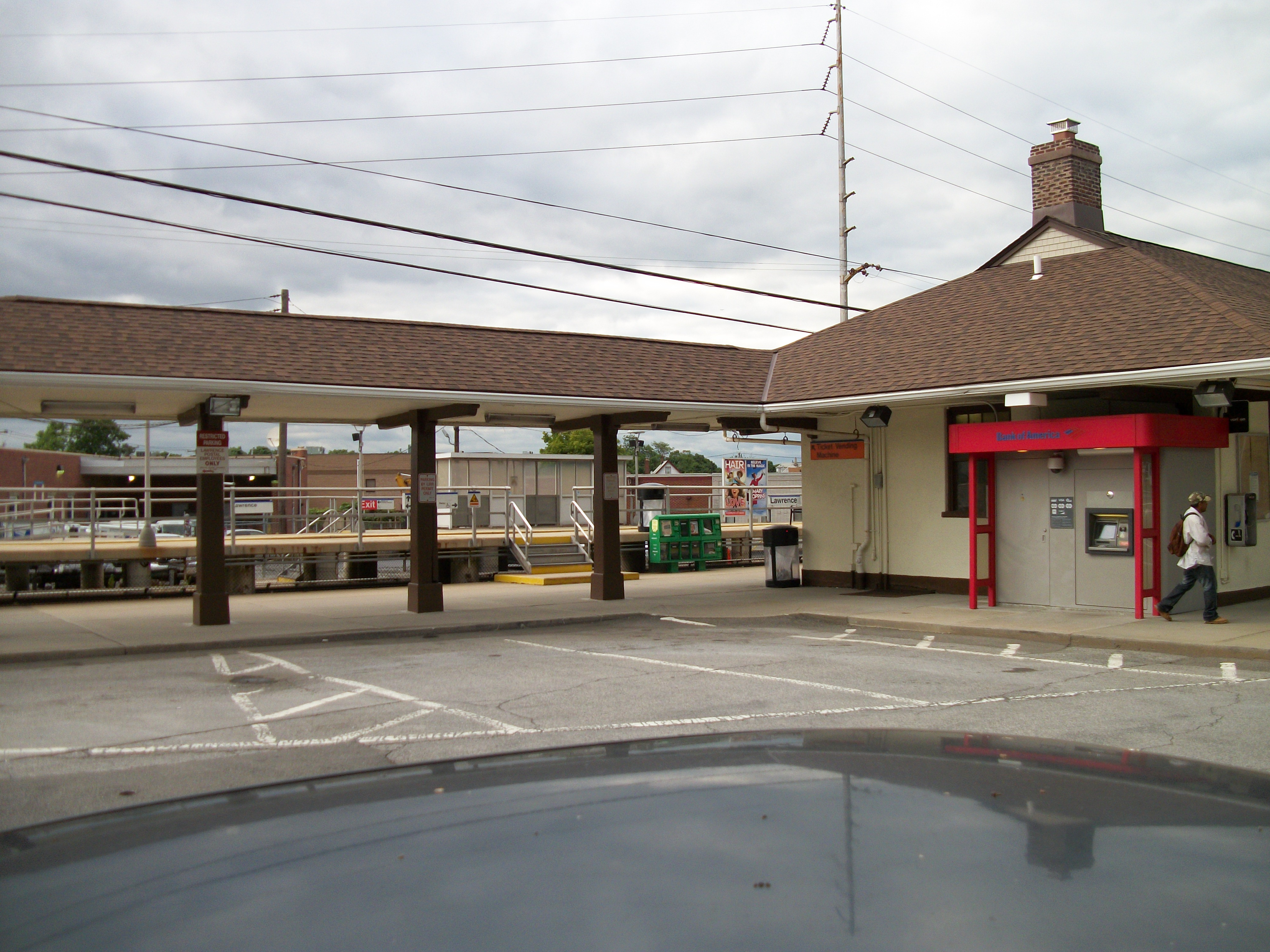
Northeast view of the canopy, platforms and tracks at the Lawrence station

This station has two high-level side platforms, each 10 cars long.

== See also ==
- List of Long Island Rail Road stations
- Inwood station (LIRR)
