= Freeport station (LIRR) =

Long Island Rail Road station in Nassau County, New York

Freeport
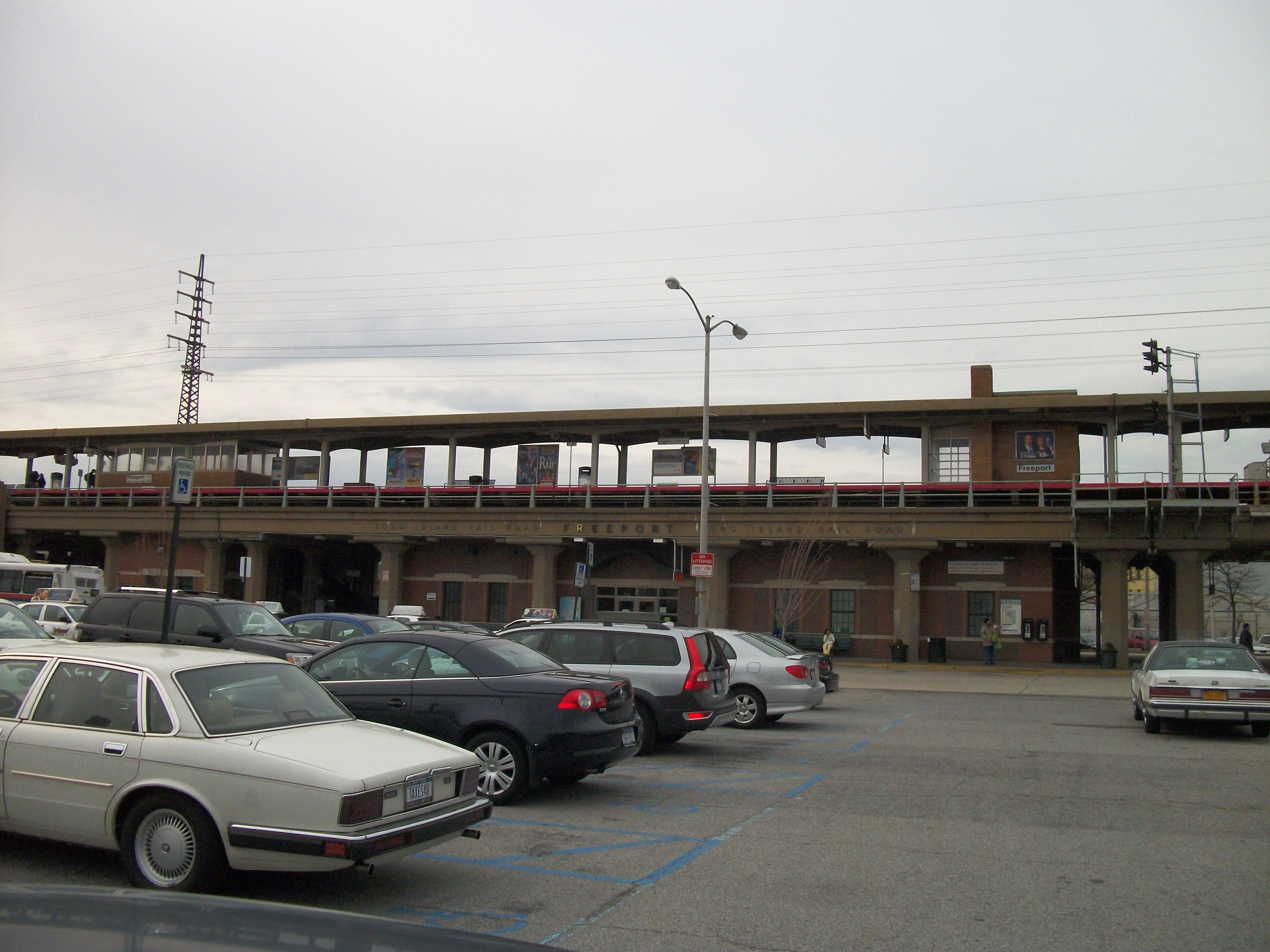
- Freeport station, as seen from its parking lot in 2011

General information
- Location: Freeport Plaza; Freeport, New York
- Coordinates: 40.657425°N 73.582601°W
- Owner: Long Island Rail Road
- Line: Montauk Branch
- Distance: 22.7 mi (36.5 km) from Long Island City
- Platforms: 1 island platform
- Tracks: 2
- Connections: Nassau Inter-County Express: n4, n4X, n19, n19X, n40, n41, n43, n88X (summer only)

Construction
- Parking: Yes
- Accessible: Yes

Other information
- Station code: FPT
- Fare zone: 7

History
- Opened: 1867; 159 years ago (SSRRLI)
- Rebuilt: 1899, 1959–1960
- Electrified: May 20, 1925; 750 V (DC) third rail

Passengers
- 2012—2014: 5,629
- Rank: 21 of 125

Services
Preceding station	Long Island Rail Road	Following station
Baldwin toward Penn Station, Grand Central or Atlantic Terminal	Babylon Branch	Merrick toward Babylon
Montauk Branch does not stop here
Former services
Preceding station	Long Island Rail Road	Following station
Baldwin toward Long Island City	Montauk Division	Merrick toward Montauk
Location

Freeport is a station on the Babylon Branch of the Long Island Rail Road. It is located at Freeport Plaza, between Henry Street and Benson Place, just north of Sunrise Highway (NY 27) in Freeport, Nassau County, New York.

The station also serves as a hub for buses operated by Nassau Inter-County Express (NICE). Furthermore, the station serves nearby Jones Beach State Park, with seasonal bus service provided by NICE between the station and the park.

== History ==
The Freeport station was originally built on October 28, 1867 by the South Side Railroad of Long Island, and was rebuilt in 1899.

It is among many of the stations along the Babylon Branch that were elevated throughout Nassau and Western Suffolk counties as part of a major grade crossing elimination project during the mid-20th century. The current, elevated station opened in October 1960.

== Station layout ==
The station has one 12-car-long high-level island platform between the two tracks. There are two layover tracks east of the station.

== Image gallery ==
Freeport station

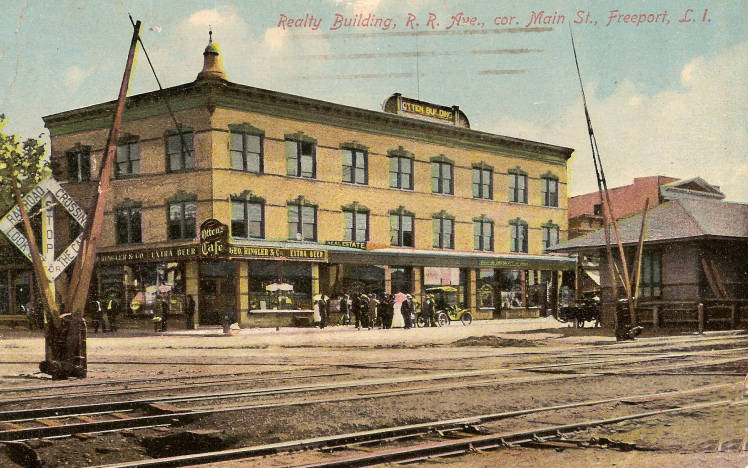
Early 20th century postcard of the station in the shadow of the Otten Building

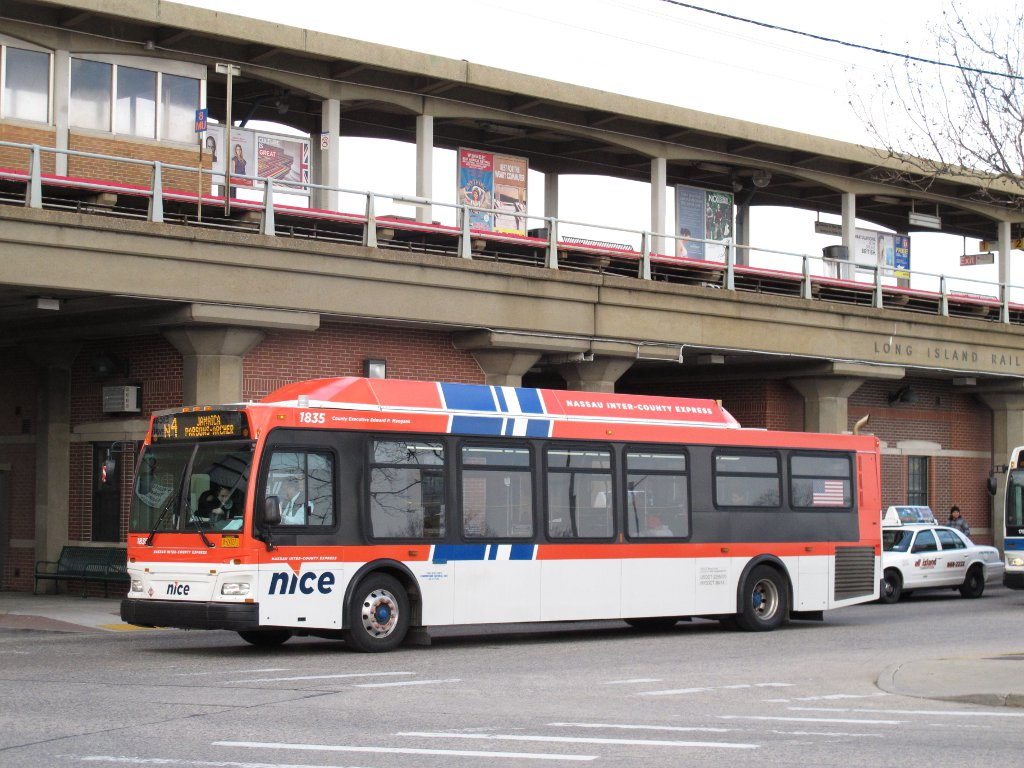
The Nassau Inter-County Express N4 bus to Jamaica

== See also ==
- List of Long Island Rail Road stations
