= Inwood station (LIRR) =

Long Island Rail Road station in Nassau County, New York

Inwood
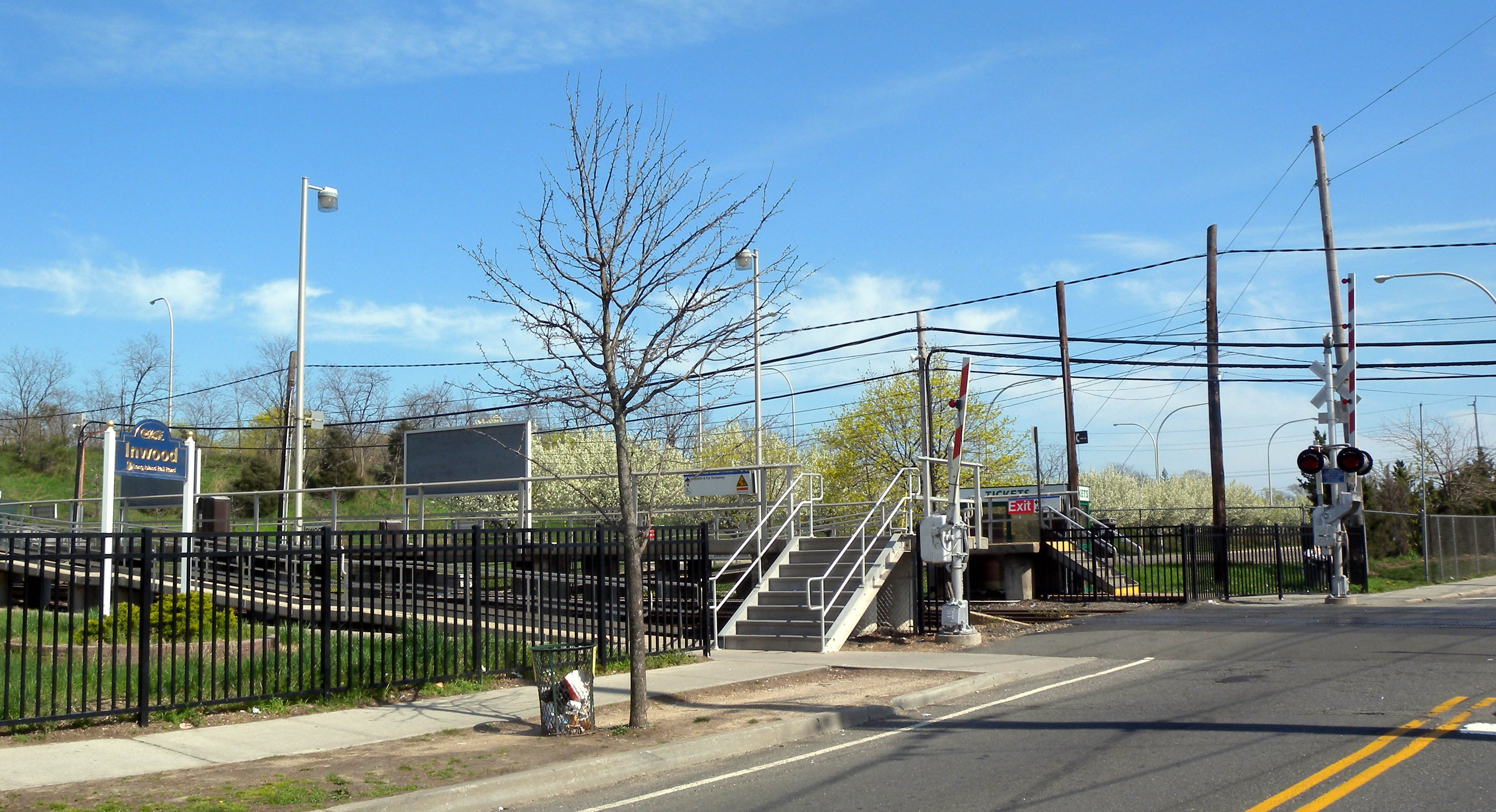
- The platforms of Inwood station

General information
- Location: Off Doughty Boulevard (two blocks west of Central Avenue); Lawrence, New York
- Coordinates: 40.612291°N 73.744311°W
- Owner: Long Island Rail Road
- Line: Far Rockaway Branch
- Platforms: 2 side platforms
- Tracks: 2
- Connections: MTA Bus: Q113, Q114; Nassau Inter-County Express: n31, n31x, n32

Construction
- Parking: Yes
- Accessible: Yes

Other information
- Station code: IWD
- Fare zone: 4

History
- Opened: December 3, 1911
- Electrified: December 11, 1905; 750 V (DC) third rail
- Former names: Westville (Unknown–1889)

Passengers
- 2012—2014: 755 per weekday

Services
Preceding station	Long Island Rail Road	Following station
Lawrence toward Penn Station or Grand Central	Far Rockaway Branch	Far Rockaway Terminus
Former services
Preceding station	Long Island Rail Road	Following station
Lawrence toward Valley Stream	Far Rockaway Branch	Far Rockaway toward Hammels
Lawrence toward Gibson	Rockaway Beach Division	Far Rockaway toward Woodside
Location

Inwood is a station on the Long Island Rail Road's Far Rockaway Branch in the Village of Lawrence, adjacent to the hamlet of Inwood, Nassau County, New York. The station is located at Doughty Boulevard (CR 75) and Brunswick Avenue (formerly Foote Avenue).

== History ==
In the 19th century, Inwood and the LIRR station located within it were named Westville. The name of the community was changed to "Inwood" on February 25, 1889, and the station followed suit. Between December 3, 1911, and 1956, the station only had sheltered-sheds.

== Station layout ==
This station has two high-level side platforms, each four cars long. It currently exists as little more than two high-level sheltered side platforms, both of which run beneath the underpass for the Nassau Expressway (NY-878).

== See also ==
- List of Long Island Rail Road stations
- Lawrence station (LIRR)
