= 168th Street Bus Terminal =

Bus station in Queens, New York

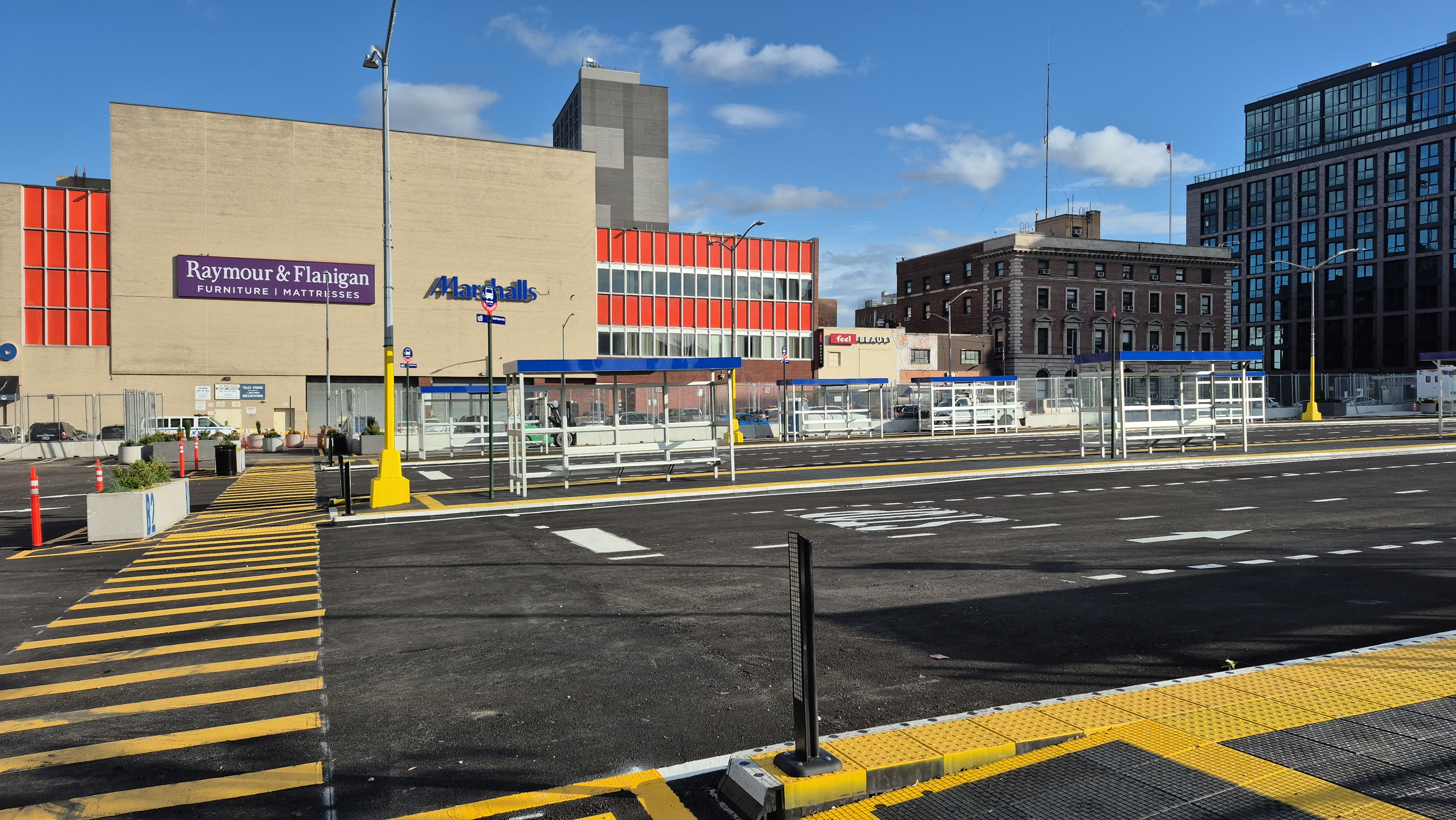
- The 168th Street Terminal in May 2025

General information
- Location: 90-01 168th Street (at 90th Avenue and 168th Street); Queens, New York City; United States
- Coordinates: 40°42′28″N 73°47′33″W
- Bus routes: 10 local MTA routes, 5 NICE Bus routes
- Bus operators: MTA Regional Bus Operations; Nassau Inter-County Express
- Connections: New York City Subway: at 169th Street at Jamaica Center–Parsons/Archer Long Island Rail Road; AirTrain JFK at Jamaica (Sutphin Blvd)

Construction
- Structure type: At-grade

History
- Opened: June 1, 2025
Location

The 168th Street Bus Terminal is a regional bus terminal in Jamaica, Queens. Opened on June 1, 2025, this terminal replaces the 165th Street Bus Terminal, which has closed due to its site being redeveloped. The terminal, located in the block bounded by 168th Street, 90th Avenue, 169th Street and 91st Avenue is approximately two blocks from the terminal it replaced.

== List of routes ==
This terminal serves six routes, (Q2, Q3, Q36, Q76, Q77, Q82) operated by MTA New York City Bus, four operated by MTA Bus Company, (Q6, Q8, Q9, Q41) and five routes (n1, n6/6X, n22/22X, n24, n26) operated by Nassau Inter-County Express (NICE; formerly MTA Long Island Bus). All of the routes that serve the terminal terminate there.
