= Malvern =

Malvern or Malverne may refer to:

== Places ==
=== Australia ===
- Malvern, South Australia, a suburb of Adelaide
- Malvern, Victoria, a suburb of Melbourne
  - Malvern railway station, Melbourne
- City of Malvern, a former local government area near Melbourne
- Electoral district of Malvern, an electoral district in Victoria

=== England ===
- Malvern, Worcestershire, a spa town and civil parish
- Malvern Hills, a ridge of hills on the boundary of Herefordshire and Worcestershire

=== United States ===
- Malvern, Alabama, a town
- Malvern, Arkansas, a city
- Malvern, Illinois, an unincorporated community in Whiteside County, Illinois
- Malvern, Iowa, a city
- Malverne, New York, a village
- Malvern, Ohio, a village
- Malvern, Pennsylvania, a borough
- Malvern, Wisconsin, an unincorporated community

=== Elsewhere ===
- Malvern, Barbados, a town in the parish of Saint Joseph
- Malvern, Jamaica, a village in the parish of Saint Elizabeth
- Malvern, Gauteng, a suburb of Johannesburg, South Africa
- Malvern, Queensburgh, KwaZulu-Natal, South Africa
- Malvern, New Zealand, a village now called Sheffield
- Malvern, Toronto, a neighbourhood in Toronto, Ontario, Canada

== Education ==
- Malvern College, a coeducational independent school in Malvern, Worcestershire, England
- Malvern College Egypt, a British international school in Cairo, Egypt
- Malvern Collegiate Institute, a high school in Toronto, Canada
- Malvern High School (disambiguation)
- Malverne High School, Malverne, New York, United States
- Malvern Preparatory School, an independent Catholic middle and high school for boys in Pennsylvania, United States

== Other uses ==
- Malvern (surname), a surname
- Malvern (Charlottesville, Virginia), a historic home and farm in the US
- Malvern Instruments, a manufacturer and supplier of laboratory analytical instruments
- USS Malvern, the name of four US Navy ships
- Viscount Malvern, a title in the Peerage of the UK
- Malvern station (disambiguation), stations with the name
- Malverne station, Malverne, New York, a railroad station
- Malvern, Portsoy, a building in Portsoy, Scotland

== See also ==
- Malvern Festival (disambiguation)
- Malvern Water (bottled water)
- Melvern (disambiguation)
- Las Malvinas, the Argentine name for the Falkland Islands
