= Lakeview station =

Long Island Rail Road station in Nassau County, New York

Lakeview
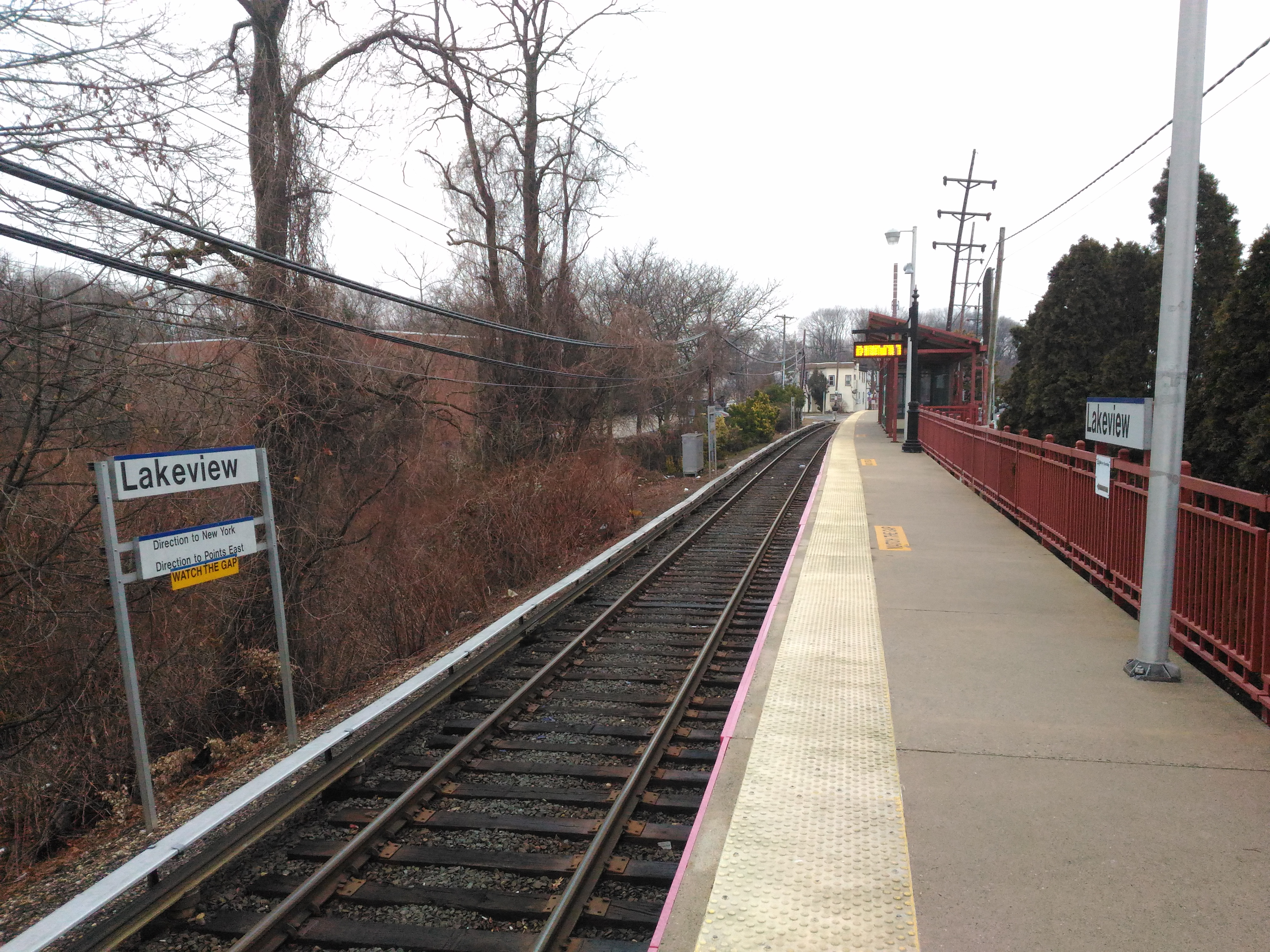
- View from the platform, facing south.

General information
- Location: Eagle Avenue & Woodfield Road; West Hempstead, New York
- Coordinates: 40°41′08″N 73°39′08″W
- Owner: Long Island Rail Road
- Line: West Hempstead Branch
- Distance: 3.4 mi (5.5 km) from Valley Stream
- Platforms: 1 side platform
- Tracks: 1
- Connections: Nassau Inter-County Express: n15

Construction
- Parking: Yes
- Cycle facilities: No
- Accessible: yes

Other information
- Station code: LVW
- Fare zone: 4

History
- Opened: 1924
- Rebuilt: c.1973, c.1995
- Electrified: October 19, 1926; 750 V (DC) third rail
- Former names: Lake View

Passengers
- 2012—2014: 592 per weekday

Services
Preceding station	Long Island Rail Road	Following station
Malverne toward Penn Station, Grand Central or Atlantic Terminal	West Hempstead Branch	Hempstead Gardens toward West Hempstead
Location

Lakeview is a station along the West Hempstead Branch of the Long Island Rail Road. It is located on the southeast corner of Eagle Avenue & Woodfield Road in West Hempstead, New York – one of three stations located in the community. Hempstead Lake State Park is nearby. The former Southern Hempstead Branch crossed the line north of this station.

== History ==
One of the newest stations on the West Hempstead Branch, Lakeview Station was built in 1924 as "Lake View," and was electrified two years later. At some point, the name of the station was changed to "Lakeview." Throughout most of its history, the station has been little more than an open shelter on a platform along the tracks between Woodfield Road and Eagle Avenue.

In 1926, upon electrification of the West Hempstead Branch, the Lakeview station began serving electric trains. The first electric train to serve Lakeview ran that October 19, bound for Mineola from Penn Station.

In late 1955 and early 1956, the Long Island Rail Road proposed closing this station and the adjacent Hempstead Gardens station, and replacing them with a new station at a point roughly halfway between the two. This station consolidation proposal was called off after the local residents voted overwhelmingly against the proposal – and ultimately, neither station was closed.

A new, high level platform was constructed at the station around 1973 to replace the existing, ground level platform and enable level boarding; prior to this, the station was unable to be serviced by the LIRR's then-new M1 railcars, which required high level platforms.

The Lakeview station was rebuilt in its current form in the mid-1990s. As part of the project, the platform was rebuilt with a new shelter, railings, and furnishings – and a ramp between the platform and the street was added to make the station compliant with the Americans with Disabilities Act of 1990.

== Station layout ==
This station has one four-car-long side platform on the west side of the single track.
