= Hempstead Gardens station =

Long Island Rail Road station in Nassau County, New York

Hempstead Gardens
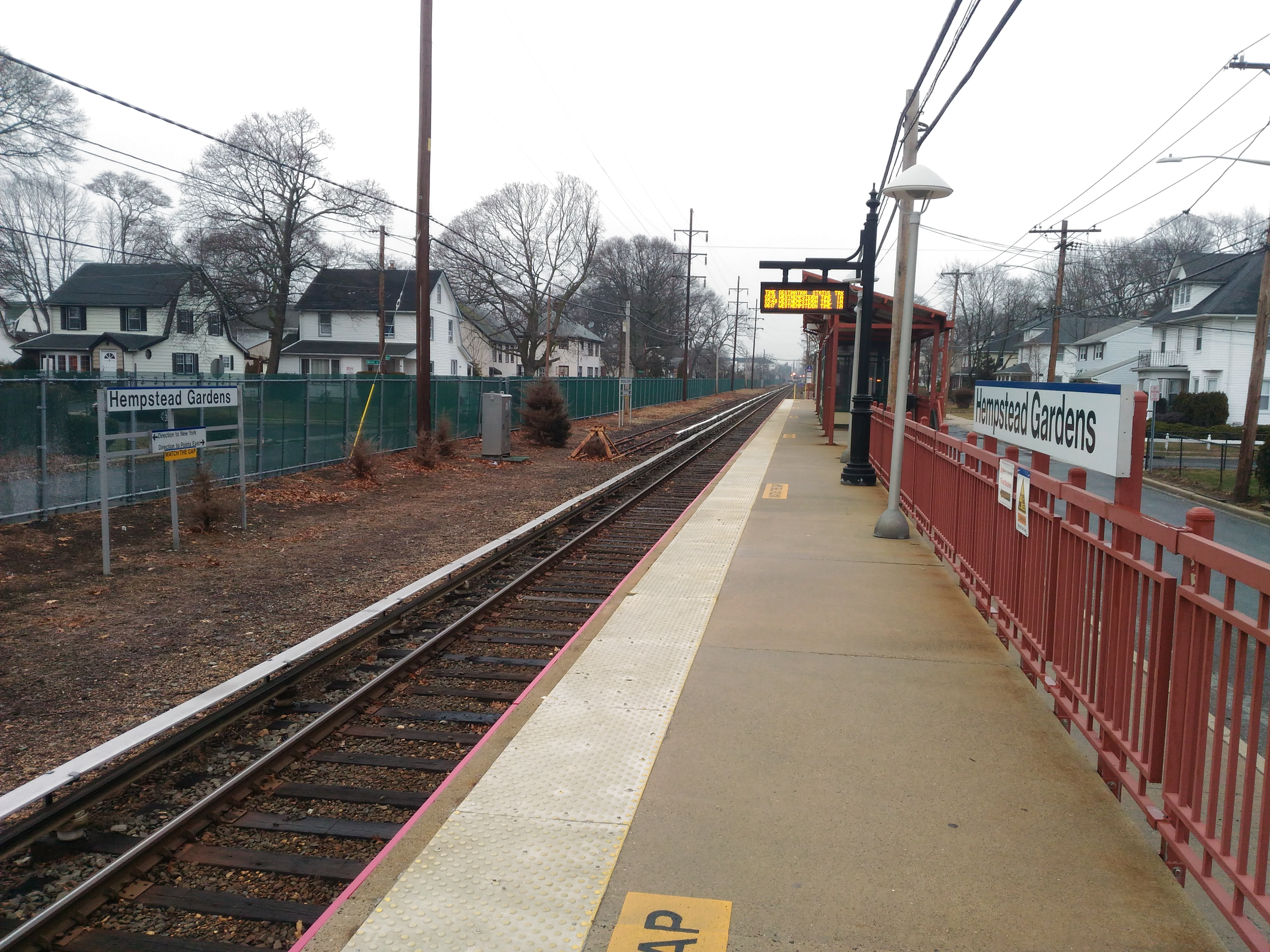
- The station platform, facing north towards West Hempstead.

General information
- Location: Hempstead Gardens Drive & Chestnut Street; West Hempstead, New York
- Coordinates: 40°41′41″N 73°38′46″W
- Owner: Long Island Rail Road
- Line: West Hempstead Branch
- Distance: 4.1 mi (6.6 km) from Valley Stream
- Platforms: 1 side platform
- Tracks: 2
- Connections: Nassau Inter-County Express: n15

Construction
- Parking: No
- Cycle facilities: No
- Accessible: Yes

Other information
- Station code: HGN
- Fare zone: 4

History
- Opened: 1893
- Rebuilt: 1973, c. 1995
- Electrified: October 19, 1926; 750 V (DC) third rail

Passengers
- 2012—2014: 368 per weekday

Services
Preceding station	Long Island Rail Road	Following station
Lakeview toward Penn Station, Grand Central or Atlantic Terminal	West Hempstead Branch	West Hempstead Terminus
Location

Hempstead Gardens is a station along the West Hempstead Branch of the Long Island Rail Road. It is located on Hempstead Gardens Drive and Chestnut Street in West Hempstead, New York, and is one of three stations located within the community.

== History ==
When Hempstead Gardens station was originally built in 1893 by the New York Bay Extension Railroad, it was little more than a small one-room shack with open canopies extending along the northbound platform.

In 1926, upon the West Hempstead Branch being electrified, the Hempstead Gardens station began serving electric trains. The first electric train to serve the Hempstead Gardens station ran that October 19th, bound for Mineola from Penn Station.

In late 1955 and early 1956, the Long Island Rail Road proposed closing this station and the adjacent Lakeview station, and replacing them with a new station at a point roughly halfway between them. This station consolidation proposal was called off after the local residents voted overwhelmingly against the proposal, and ultimately neither station was closed.

At some point between the 1950s and 1972, the shack was replaced by an open sheltered shed. A new, high level platform was constructed in 1973 to replace the existing, ground level platform and enable level boarding; prior to this, the station was unable to be serviced by the LIRR's then-new M1 railcars, which required high level platforms.

The station was rebuilt in its current form in the mid-1990s. As part of the project, the platform was rebuilt with a new shelter, railings, and furnishings – and a ramp between the platform and the street was added to make the station compliant with the Americans with Disabilities Act of 1990.

== Station layout ==
Hempstead Gardens station has a single track and one four-car-long side platform on its east side that is compliant with the Americans with Disabilities Act of 1990. The second track for the West Hempstead Branch begins just northeast of this station – although the right-of-way for the second track exists here, as well.

This station is one of the few stations on the LIRR outside New York City which lacks parking facilities. The station has two daily ticket machines located near the waiting room.
