= Malvern station =

Malvern station or Malverne station may refer to:

- East Malvern railway station, in Melbourne, Australia
- Malvern railway station, Melbourne, in Australia
- Malvern tram depot, in Melbourne, Australia
- Great Malvern railway station, a station in Malvern, England
- Malvern Link railway station, a station in Malvern, England
- Malvern station (Arkansas), an Amtrak station in Malvern, Arkansas, U.S.
- Malvern station (SEPTA), a SEPTA station in Malvern, Pennsylvania, U.S.
- Malvern Loop station, a trolley station in Philadelphia, Pennsylvania, U.S

== See also ==
- Malverne station, a Long Island Rail Road station in Malverne, New York, U.S.
- Malvern (disambiguation)
