= Malverne station =

Long Island Rail Road station in Nassau County, New York

Malverne
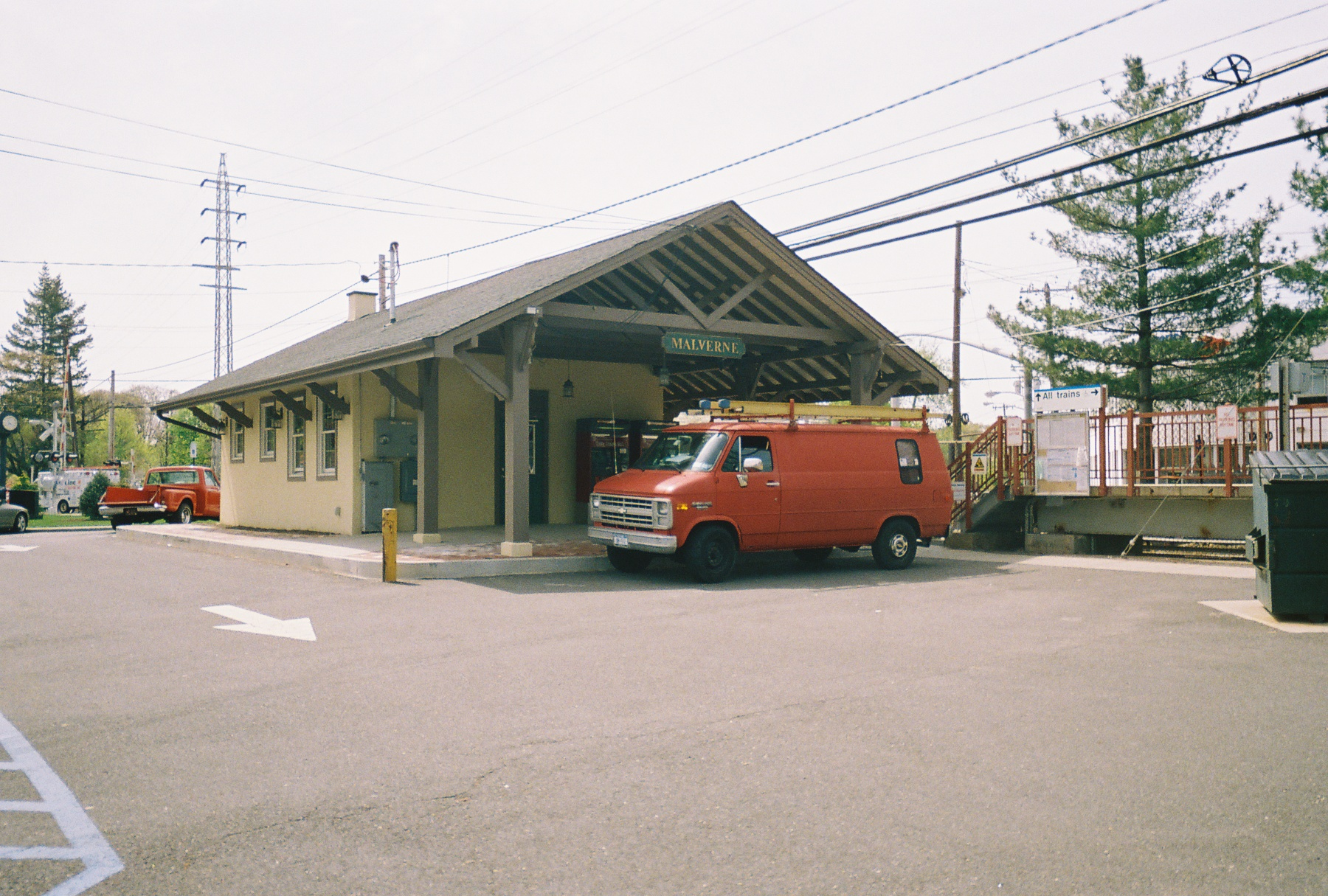
- Malverne station from the parking lot

General information
- Location: Hempstead Avenue and Utterby Road; Malverne, New York
- Coordinates: 40°40′32″N 73°40′07″W
- Owner: Long Island Rail Road
- Line: West Hempstead Branch
- Distance: 2.2 mi (3.5 km) from Valley Stream
- Platforms: 1 side platform
- Tracks: 1
- Connections: Nassau Inter-County Express: n31, n31x, n32

Construction
- Parking: Yes, Metered; Village of Malverne
- Cycle facilities: Yes
- Accessible: Yes

Other information
- Station code: MVN
- Fare zone: 4

History
- Opened: 1909 or February 1913
- Electrified: October 19, 1926; 750 V (DC) third rail
- Former names: Norwood

Passengers
- 2012—2014: 825 per weekday

Services
Preceding station	Long Island Rail Road	Following station
Westwood toward Penn Station, Grand Central or Atlantic Terminal	West Hempstead Branch	Lakeview toward West Hempstead
Location

Malverne is a historic railroad station along the West Hempstead Branch of the Long Island Rail Road. It is officially located at Hempstead Avenue and Utterby Road, in Malverne, New York, and is also parallel to Church Street near Malverne Village Hall. Parking is primarily for those with residential and non-residential permits, but metered parking is available.

== History ==
Depending on the source, the station was built in either 1909 or February 1913. The station was originally named "Norwood" until it, and the community it serves were renamed Malverne, in order to alleviate confusion with another Norwood, New York in St. Lawrence County. "Norwood" was also the name of a station on the former Southern Hempstead Branch of the South Side Railroad of Long Island. Though not officially considered a historic landmark, it is the oldest surviving station along the West Hempstead Branch.

In February 1955, the LIRR agreed to extend the platform by 150 feet (46 m) so it could accommodate ten-car trains. The footpath across the tracks was moved 150 feet (46 m) to the east.

== Station layout ==
This station has one four-car-long side platform on the east side of the single track.
