= Malverne Park Oaks, New York =

- Hamlet and census-designated place
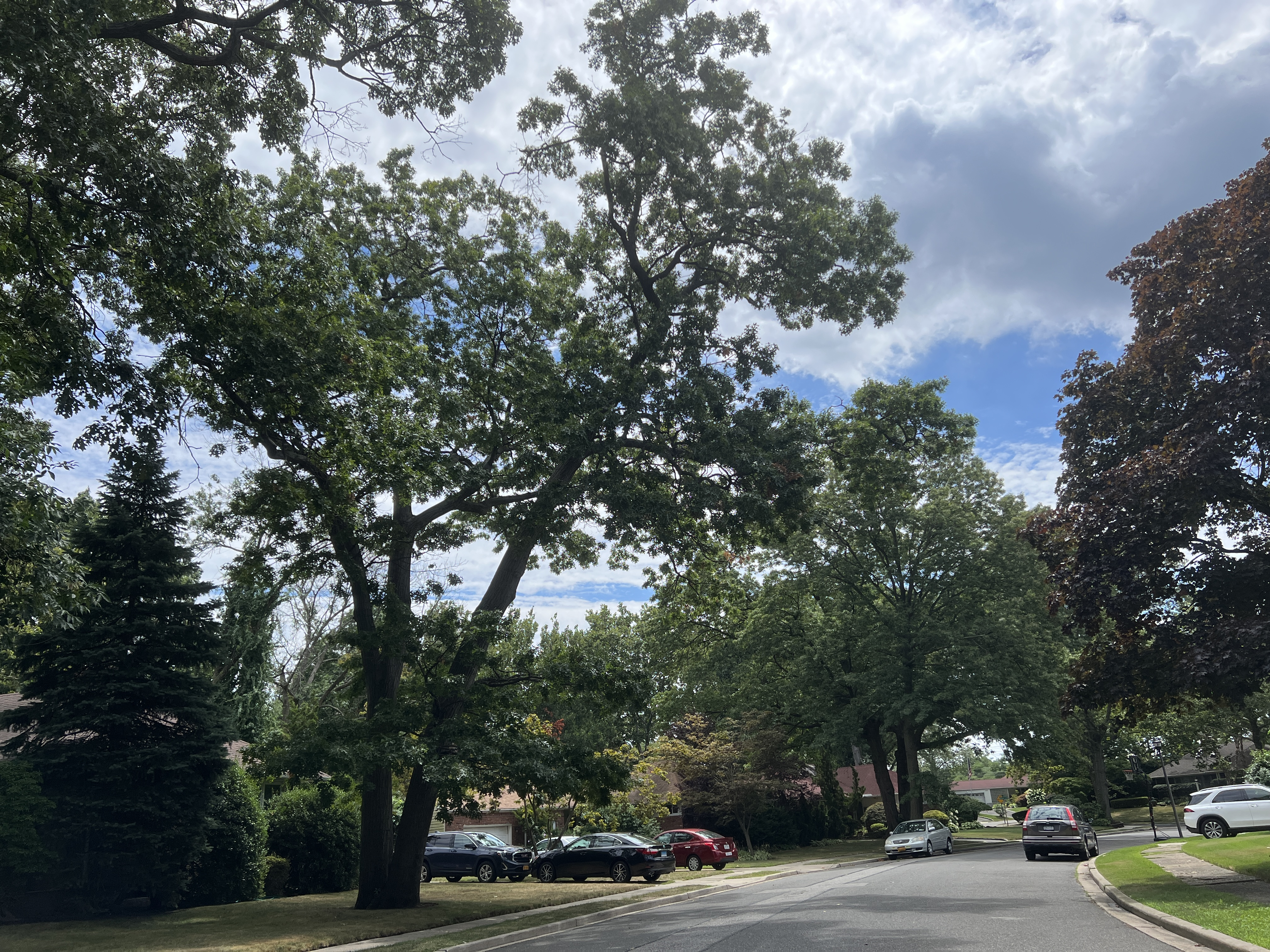
- Walden Place within Malverne Park Oaks in 2022

- Location in Nassau County and the state of New York

- Location on Long Island Location within the state of New York
- Coordinates: 40°40′52″N 73°39′53″W
- Country: United States
- State: New York
- County: Nassau
- Town: Hempstead

Area
  - Total: 0.13 sq mi (0.34 km^{2})
  - Land: 0.13 sq mi (0.34 km^{2})
  - Water: 0 sq mi (0.00 km^{2})
- Elevation: 9.8 ft (3 m)

Population (2020)
  - Total: 538
  - Density: 4,138.0/sq mi (1,597.69/km^{2})
- Time zone: UTC-5 (Eastern (EST))
  - Summer (DST): UTC-4 (EDT)
- ZIP Codes: 11552 (West Hempstead); 11565 (Malverne)
- Area code(s): 516, 363
- FIPS code: 36-44792
- GNIS feature ID: 1852905

Malverne Park Oaks is a hamlet and census-designated place (CDP) within the Town of Hempstead in Nassau County, on Long Island, in New York, United States. The population was 538 at the time of the 2020 census.

== History ==
The CDP was first created for the 2000 census.

While designated as one area, it is actually made up of three different, smaller communities: Malverne Park, Malverne Oaks South, and Malverne Oaks North.

When the Incorporated Village of Malverne was seeking to become an incorporated village in 1921, the residents from this area did not wish to become part of the new village and therefore remained a hamlet under the Town of Hempstead.

== Geography ==
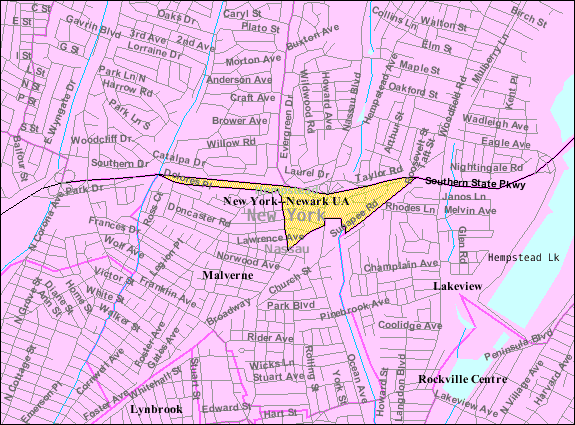
U.S. Census map of Malverne Park Oaks

According to the United States Census Bureau, the CDP has a total area of 0.1 square miles (0.26 km^{2}), all land.

The Malverne Park section of the hamlet is more closely associated with the Village of Malverne as it falls within its fire and school districts as well as the Malverne ZIP code (11565).

The Malverne Oaks North and South sections of the hamlet, meanwhile, are linked more with West Hempstead for similar districting reasons and due to using a West Hempstead ZIP code (11552).

== Demographics ==
Historical population
Census	Pop.	Note	%±
1990	626		—
2000	470		−24.9%
2010	505		7.4%
2020	538		6.5%
U.S. Decennial Census

As of the census of 2000, there were 470 people, 175 households, and 145 families residing in the CDP. The population density was 4,002.1 inhabitants per square mile (1,545.2/km^{2}). There were 175 housing units at an average density of 1,490.1 per square mile (575.3/km^{2}). The racial makeup of the CDP was 90.64% White, 3.62% African American, 4.26% Asian, 1.28% from other races, and 0.21% from two or more races. Hispanic or Latino of any race were 7.45% of the population.

There were 175 households, out of which 34.3% had children under the age of 18 living with them, 72.0% were married couples living together, 8.0% had a female householder with no husband present, and 16.6% were non-families. 13.7% of all households were made up of individuals, and 8.6% had someone living alone who was 65 years of age or older. The average household size was 2.69 and the average family size was 2.94.

In the CDP, the population was spread out, with 22.8% under the age of 18, 4.5% from 18 to 24, 23.4% from 25 to 44, 30.2% from 45 to 64, and 19.1% who were 65 years of age or older. The median age was 45 years. For every 100 females, there were 92.6 males. For every 100 females age 18 and over, there were 87.1 males.

The median income for a household in the CDP was $91,208, and the median income for a family was $91,597. Males had a median income of $56,786 versus $31,250 for females. The per capita income for the CDP was $34,379. None of the population or families were below the poverty line.

== Education ==
Part of Malverne Park Oaks is located within the boundaries of (and is thus served by) the Malverne Union Free School District, while another section is in the West Hempstead Union Free School District. As such, children who reside within the hamlet and attend public schools go to school in one of these two districts, depending on where they reside within Malverne Park Oaks.

== Transportation ==
The Southern State Parkway travels through and serves Malverne Park Oaks, running along the hamlet's northern border.

== See also ==
- North Lynbrook – another hamlet that remained unincorporated when Malverne chose to incorporate in 1921.
