= Westwood station =

Westwood station may refer to:

- Westwood station (LIRR), a commuter rail station in Hempstead, New York, on the Long Island Rail Road's West Hempstead Branch
- Westwood station (NJ Transit), a commuter rail station in Westwood, New Jersey, on NJ Transit Rail Operations' Pascack Valley Line
- Westwood/Rancho Park station, a light rail station in Los Angeles, California, on the Los Angeles Metro Rail's E Line
- Westwood/UCLA station, a planned rapid transit station in Los Angeles, California, on the Los Angeles Metro Rail's D Line
