= West Hempstead Branch =

Long Island Rail Road branch

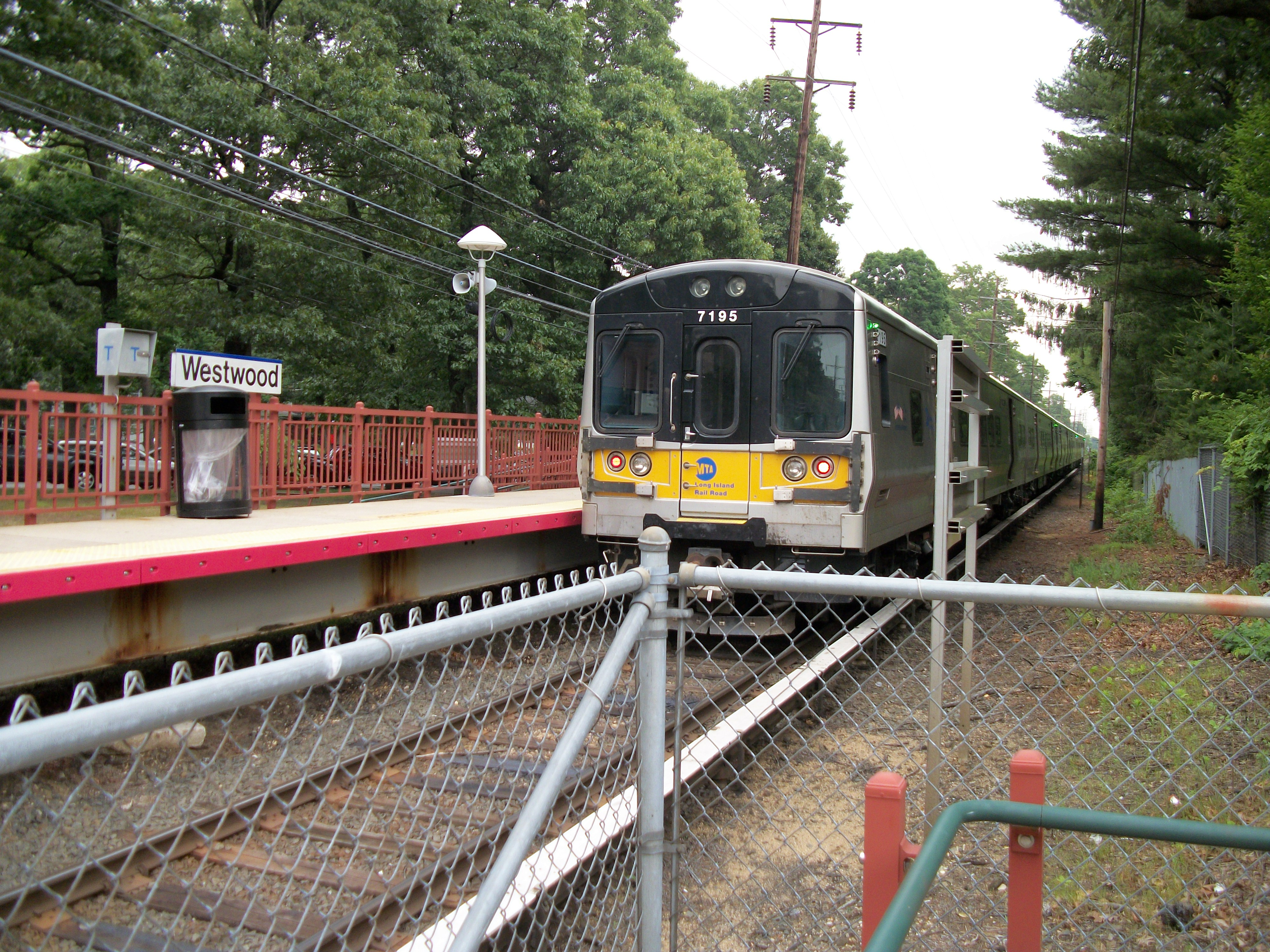
- A West Hempstead-bound train at the Westwood station.

Overview
- Status: Operational
- Owner: Long Island Rail Road
- Locale: Nassau County, New York, USA
- Termini: St. Albans; West Hempstead
- Stations: 6

Service
- Type: Commuter rail
- System: Long Island Rail Road
- Services: West Hempstead Branch
- Operator: Metropolitan Transportation Authority
- Ridership: 1,133,289 (annual ridership, 2025)

History
- Opened: 1893

Technical
- Track gauge: 4 ft 8 1/2 in (1,435 mm) standard gauge
- Electrification: Third rail, 750 V DC
Route map
- Distances shown from Long Island City via the Lower Montauk Branch

The West Hempstead Branch is an electrified rail line owned and operated by the Long Island Rail Road (LIRR). It runs between Valley Stream and West Hempstead, in Nassau County, New York, United States.

== Route description ==
The branch separates from the Montauk Branch just east of Valley Stream, and runs northeast to West Hempstead. The line has one track between Westwood station and Hempstead Gardens and two from there to the end of the line in West Hempstead, the southbound or east track being a siding. The right-of-way of the West Hempstead Branch is wide enough for two tracks for its whole length, although it would require the relocation of some platforms and facilities. There are three grade-crossings on the line, reducing the maximum speed to 65 miles per hour (105 km/h) – and because of curves at the Lakeview and Malverne stations, the speed on that stretch is lowered to 45 miles per hour (72 km/h).

The branch had one manual block from "HC" to "VA" until "WM" block limit was installed in 1935.

As the smallest LIRR commuter branch, the West Hempstead Branch was one of the last in the system to modernize. It was the last of the electrified LIRR branches to receive high-level platforms, receiving them in the early 1970s – in addition to being the last of the electrified branches to be fitted with Automatic Train Control (known as Automatic Speed Control by the LIRR), which it received in October 2009 during a system overhaul and upgrade at VALLEY Interlocking. Aside from the Greenport Branch, an infrequently served diesel-only part of the Main line, the branch has the lowest ridership of any on the Long Island Rail Road. Subsequently, the branch is one of the Long Island Rail Road lines most vulnerable to closure, and it was threatened with abandonment in the past. From September 2010 until November 22, 2014, the line had no weekend service due to budgetary constraints, with St. Albans served by Babylon Branch trains on weekends.

== History ==
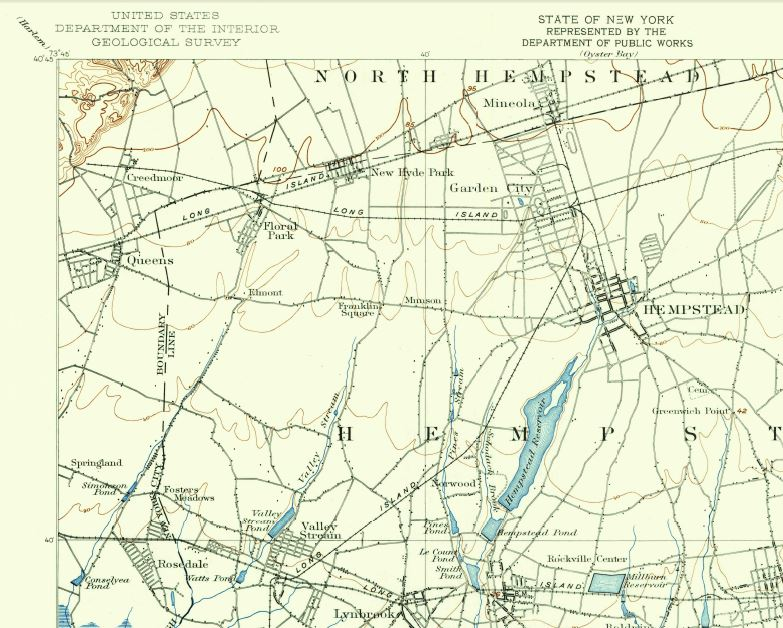
1897 map of Hempstead, including the West Hempstead Branch before it was truncated south of Hempstead Avenue.

The West Hempstead Branch was the indirect successor to the old South Side Railroad's Southern Hempstead Branch, which ran a similar route north from Valley Stream to Hempstead, before being torn up in the 1880s. On January 26, 1892, the New York Bay Extension Railroad Company was incorporated as a subsidiary of the Long Island Rail Road to build a line running from Garden City to a point in the town of New Lots in Kings County near the intersection with the New York, Brooklyn & Manhattan Beach Railway Company. The 5.89 miles (9,480 m) line was built between Country Life Press to Valley Stream and opened in 1893. The LIRR leased its property in 1897, and formally merged with the New York Bay Extension Railroad on August 29, 1902. The West Hempstead Branch originally extended beyond its current terminus and through Hempstead. It connected with the current day Hempstead Branch at Country Life Press. From the Country Life Press station, the line had several routings it could take. It could loop west and continue down the Hempstead Branch to Jamaica. Through an elaborate wye system, trains could also loop east and continue down the Central Branch to Babylon (the split between the Hempstead and Central Branches occur just west of Country Life Press). Trains could also head north on the wye and continue all the way north to Mineola and connect with both the Main Line and Oyster Bay Branches.

Storage battery cars ran on the non-electrified branch between June 1913 and May 1926. The upper end of the branch was electrified in 1911 or 1912 from Country Life Press to Franklin Avenue in Garden City to allow MU baggage cars access to the Doubleday plant.

On October 19, 1926, the portion of the line between Valley Stream and Franklin Avenue in Garden City was electrified at the cost of $1 million and it was inaugurated with a special train. New through service running between Valley Stream and Mineola began on the West Hempstead Branch the next day. The freight sidings, however, were not electrified until 1927 and 1928. The connection to the Oyster Bay Branch was severed in 1928, while the portions of the line between Mineola and Country Life Press and between Country Life Press and West Hempstead were taken out of revenue passenger service on September 15, 1935 due to the costly grade crossing elimination improvements imposed upon the LIRR by the Interstate Commerce Commission, as well as the New York Public Service Commission. This meant that no more thru service between Valley Stream and Mineola could operate.

The track connection at Country Life Press to the West Hempstead Branch was removed on August 19, 1960, and on this same date the tracks were cut back from Country Life Press to the west side of the Franklin Avenue crossing. The remaining tracks north of West Hempstead at Hempstead Avenue were removed sometime between 1967 and 1969. Freight trains and non-revenue rerouting trains continued down these portions up until their closure. The rights-of-way remain intact.

=== 2023 service changes ===
Prior to February 27, 2023, off-peak service was provided by a bi-hourly shuttle service operating between West Hempstead and Valley Stream, with St. Albans being served by Babylon Branch trains. However, as West Hempstead branch trains crossed both tracks of the Montauk Branch to enter Track 1 at Valley Stream, this limited service that could be provided on both branches. This effect also extended to the Long Beach and Far Rockaway branches, as both branches would have to provide bi-directional service on a single track through the station. Following the full opening of Grand Central Madison, service to Atlantic Terminal in Brooklyn was cut back to a shuttle to Jamaica. To compensate for the lack of through service to Brooklyn and to allow for cross-platform-transfers at Jamaica for Brooklyn-bound customers, off-peak West Hempstead trains stopped serving Valley Stream and began running hourly through to Atlantic Terminal with peak trains now serving both Penn Station and Grand Central Terminal as of February 27, 2023.

== Stations ==
West of St. Albans, all trains terminate at Atlantic Terminal, Grand Central Madison, Jamaica, or Penn Station. During weekdays, most trains terminate at Atlantic Terminal, Grand Central Madison, and Penn Station, with one eastbound shuttle between Jamaica and St. Albans originating at Jamaica. During weekends and holidays, all trains terminate at Atlantic Terminal.

Stations beyond West Hempstead were on a former connection to the Oyster Bay Branch that was abandoned in 1966.

Zone	Location	Station	Miles (km) from Long Island City via the Lower Montauk Branch	Date opened	Date closed	Connections and notes
3	St. Albans, Queens	St. Albans	11.8 (19.0)	1898		New York City Bus: Q3, Q4, Q51, QM64
3	Springfield Gardens, Queens	Springfield Gardens		c. 1870	1979	Originally named Springfield
Zone	Location	Station	Miles (km) from Valley Junction	Date opened	Date closed	Connections and notes
4	Malverne	Westwood	1.3 (2.1)	1929		
4	Malverne	Malverne	2.1 (3.4)	c. 1909		Nassau Inter-County Express: n31, n31x, n32
4	West Hempstead	Lakeview	3.3 (5.3)	1924		Nassau Inter-County Express: n15
4	West Hempstead	Hempstead Gardens	4.0 (6.4)	1893		Nassau Inter-County Express: n15
4	West Hempstead	West Hempstead	4.6 (7.4)	1928		Nassau Inter-County Express: n15, n31, n31x, n32
4	Garden City	Country Life Press		1911	1939	Served by Hempstead Branch trains
4	Garden City	Stewart Avenue		1923	1926	Built to replace Hempstead Crossing, but abandoned upon electrification
4	Garden City	Hempstead Crossing		1894	1923	Also named Garden City
4	Mineola	Mineola		1837	1928	Served by Main Line trains
