= Ralph Penza =

American journalist (1932–2007)

- Born: November 22, 1932
- Died: February 16, 2007 (aged 74); New York City, New York, U.S.
- Education: New York University
- Occupation: Journalist

Ralph Penza (November 22, 1932 – February 16, 2007) was an American broadcast journalist who appeared for many years on WNBC and WCBS in New York City, serving as anchor of news broadcasts.

He was known for his aggressive reporting style and won multiple awards, including six Emmys.

== Biography ==
Penza grew up in Long Island, New York and graduated from Valley Stream Central High School in Valley Stream, New York. He lived most of his adult life in Malverne, immediately adjacent to his boyhood hometown in Valley Stream.

While in high school, Penza served as a copy boy for Walter Winchell. Penza graduated from New York University, where he was a member of Alpha Phi Delta, with a bachelor's degree in radio and television. Penza reported in Coatesville, Pennsylvania and Waterloo, Iowa. Prior to joining WNBC, Penza worked as the news director at WSAV-TV in Savannah, Georgia, as an anchor and reporter at WDVM in Washington, D.C., as an anchor at WCAU in Philadelphia, as a producer, reporter and anchor at WCBS, and as a producer at WABC.

Penza first joined WNBC in 1980, left the station in 1995 and rejoined it in October 1997. Among his many honors were six Emmy Awards and two New York Press Club Gold Typewriter awards.

In February 1998, while covering Pope John Paul II's trip to Cuba, Penza located Joanne Chesimard, who was convicted of killing New Jersey state trooper Werner Foerster twenty-four years earlier. She was sentenced to life in prison but escaped in 1979 and fled to Cuba for political asylum. She spoke to Penza in an interview, during which she maintained her innocence and recounted the night of the shooting.

Penza's coverage of the Pope's visit to the Holy Land earned him an Emmy Award in 2000.

== Personal life and death ==
Penza died from an undisclosed illness at the age of seventy-four in 2007. He was survived by his wife Lucille and two children.
