= Melvern (disambiguation) =

Melvern may refer to:

- Melvern Township, Osage County, Kansas
  - Melvern, Kansas, a city within the township
- Melvern Lake, Kansas, a reservoir created by Melvern Dam
- Linda Melvern (born 1949), British investigative journalist
- Melvern Rivers Rutherford (born 1967), American country music songwriter

== See also ==
- Malvern (disambiguation)
