= Pagan-Fletcher House =

Historic house in New York, United States

- U.S. National Register of Historic Places
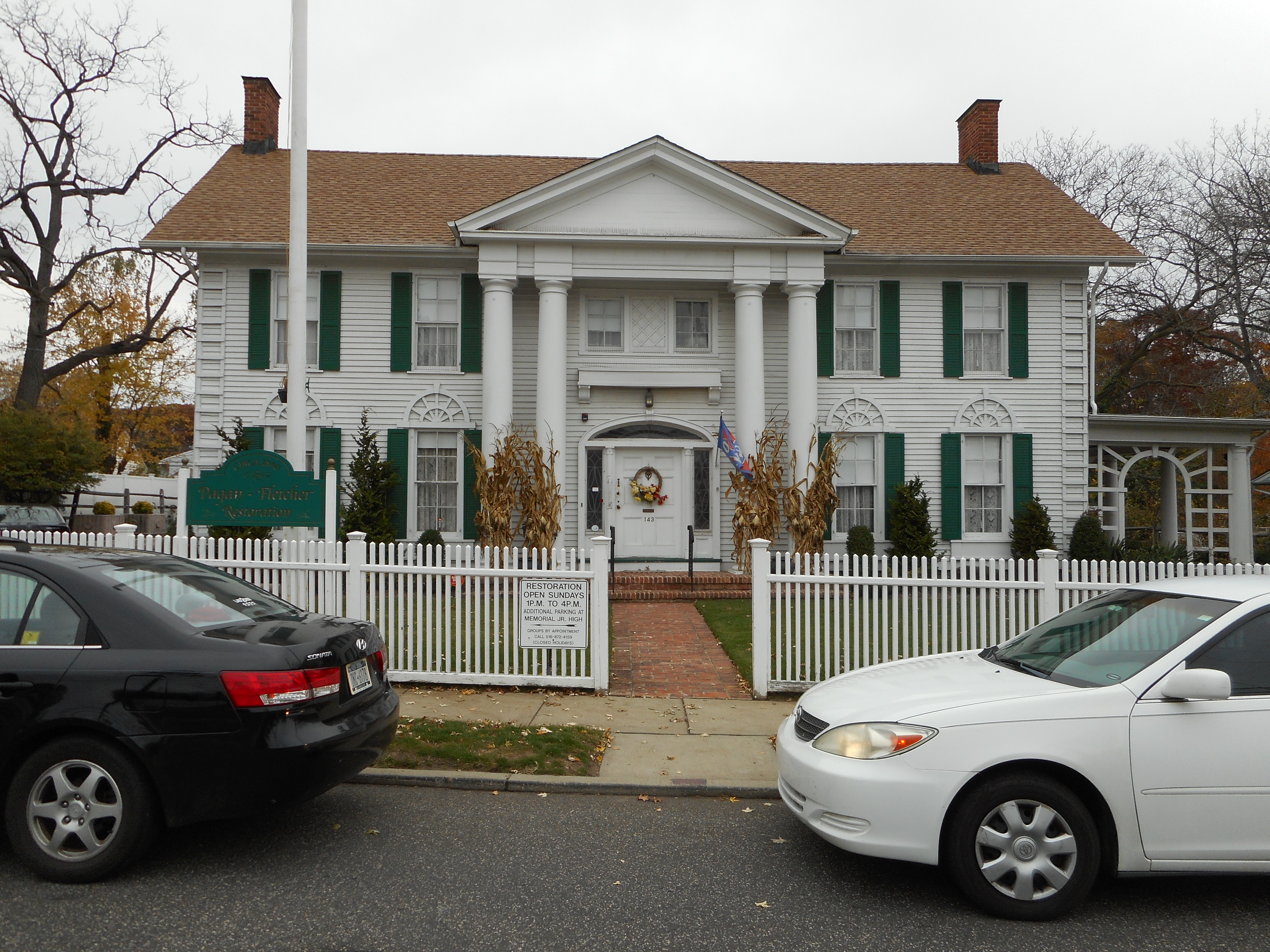

- Location within New York Location within the United States
- Location: 143 Hendrickson Ave., Valley Stream, New York
- Coordinates: 40°40′31″N 73°41′52″W
- Area: less than one acre
- Built: 1840
- Architectural style: Colonial Revival
- NRHP reference No.: 83001715
- Added to NRHP: September 8, 1983

The Pagan-Fletcher Restoration (once known as the Pagan-Fletcher House) is a historic home located at Valley Stream in Nassau County, New York. Built c. 1880, it is a two-story, clapboard-sided dwelling, five bays wide with a shallow central portico. It has a one-story rear wing with an exterior end chimney. It was extensively remodeled in the early 20th century to the Colonial Revival style, when the farmhouse was more than doubled in size. It is one of the few surviving 19th-century structures in Valley Stream. The house was the site of the village's first general store, Methodist meeting hall, and informal post office.

It was listed on the National Register of Historic Places in 1983.

The house was purchased by the Village of Valley Stream in 1978. It has been restored by the Valley Stream Historical Society to its early 20th-century appearance. In 1992, the newly renamed Pagan-Fletcher Restoration opened to the public on Sunday afternoons from 1:00 pm to 4:00 pm.
