= Westwood station (LIRR) =

Long Island Rail Road station in Nassau County, New York

Westwood
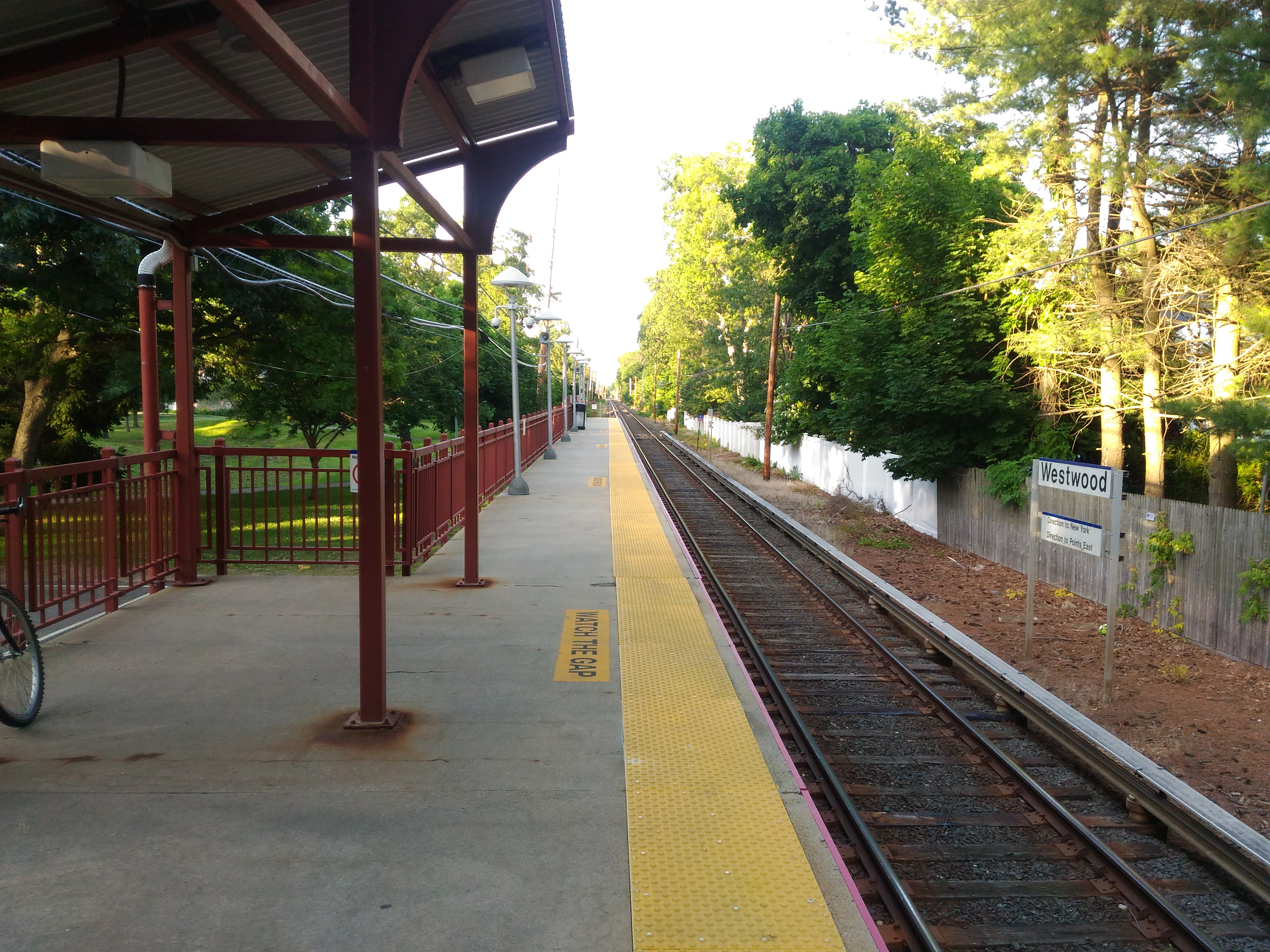
- View from the platform, facing north.

General information
- Location: Foster Avenue & Motley Street; Malverne, New York
- Coordinates: 40°40′05.8″N 73°40′53.1″W
- Owner: Long Island Rail Road
- Line: West Hempstead Branch
- Distance: 1.4 mi (2.3 km) from Valley Stream
- Platforms: 1 side platform
- Tracks: 1

Construction
- Parking: Yes; Village of Malverne & Lynbrook permits required
- Cycle facilities: Yes; Bicycle Racks
- Accessible: Yes

Other information
- Station code: WWD
- Fare zone: 4

History
- Opened: September 1929
- Rebuilt: 1955
- Electrified: October 19, 1926; 750 V (DC) third rail

Passengers
- 2012–2014: 610 per weekday

Services
Preceding station	Long Island Rail Road	Following station
St. Albans toward Penn Station, Grand Central or Atlantic Terminal	West Hempstead Branch	Malverne toward West Hempstead
Location

Westwood is a station on the Long Island Rail Road's West Hempstead Branch serving the villages of Malverne and Lynbrook, New York. The station platform is located on Foster Avenue in Malverne, with parking facilities on both the Malverne (Foster Avenue at Motley Street) and Lynbrook (Whitehall Street at Whittier Street) sides of the tracks. It has no station building other than a pair of open shelters, the larger one on the Malverne side of the tracks. It also features a gated at-grade pedestrian crossing, one of only a few stations on the Long Island Rail Road to feature such crossings.

No buses connect to Westwood station. A basketball court can be found on the Malverne side of the station between the platform and parking lot.

== History ==
Before the establishment of Westwood station, the station itself was the site of a junction of two freight sidings in Lynbrook that existed only in 1924 both of which were abandoned in September of that year. The line was electrified on October 19, 1926 and the station itself was established in September 1929. The small station house had a single platform on the Malverne side, as well as an un-gated pedestrian crossing, and a pedestrian bridge over the tracks which existed only until 1938. By 1955, the station house was gutted, leaving only the roof and the frame, thus transforming it into an open shelter. At some point, an identical open shelter was built on the Lynbrook side of the tracks, which had a separate color scheme from the Malverne shelter until the 21st century.

== Platform and track ==
This station has one four-car-long side platform on the west side of the single track, which was converted into a high-level platform in fall 1973.

== Gallery ==
Westwood station

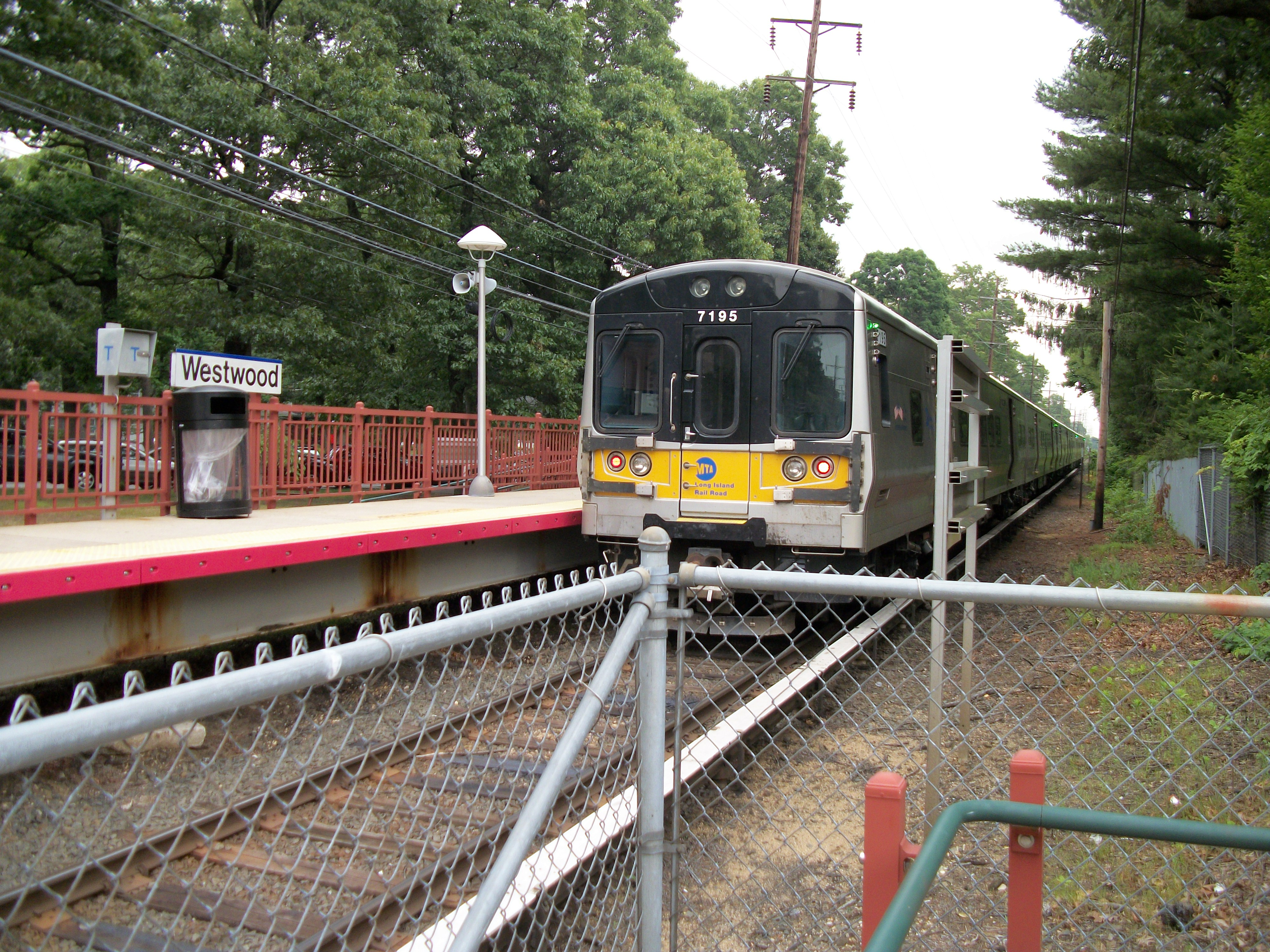
A train bound for West Hempstead as seen from the Lynbrook side of the tracks.

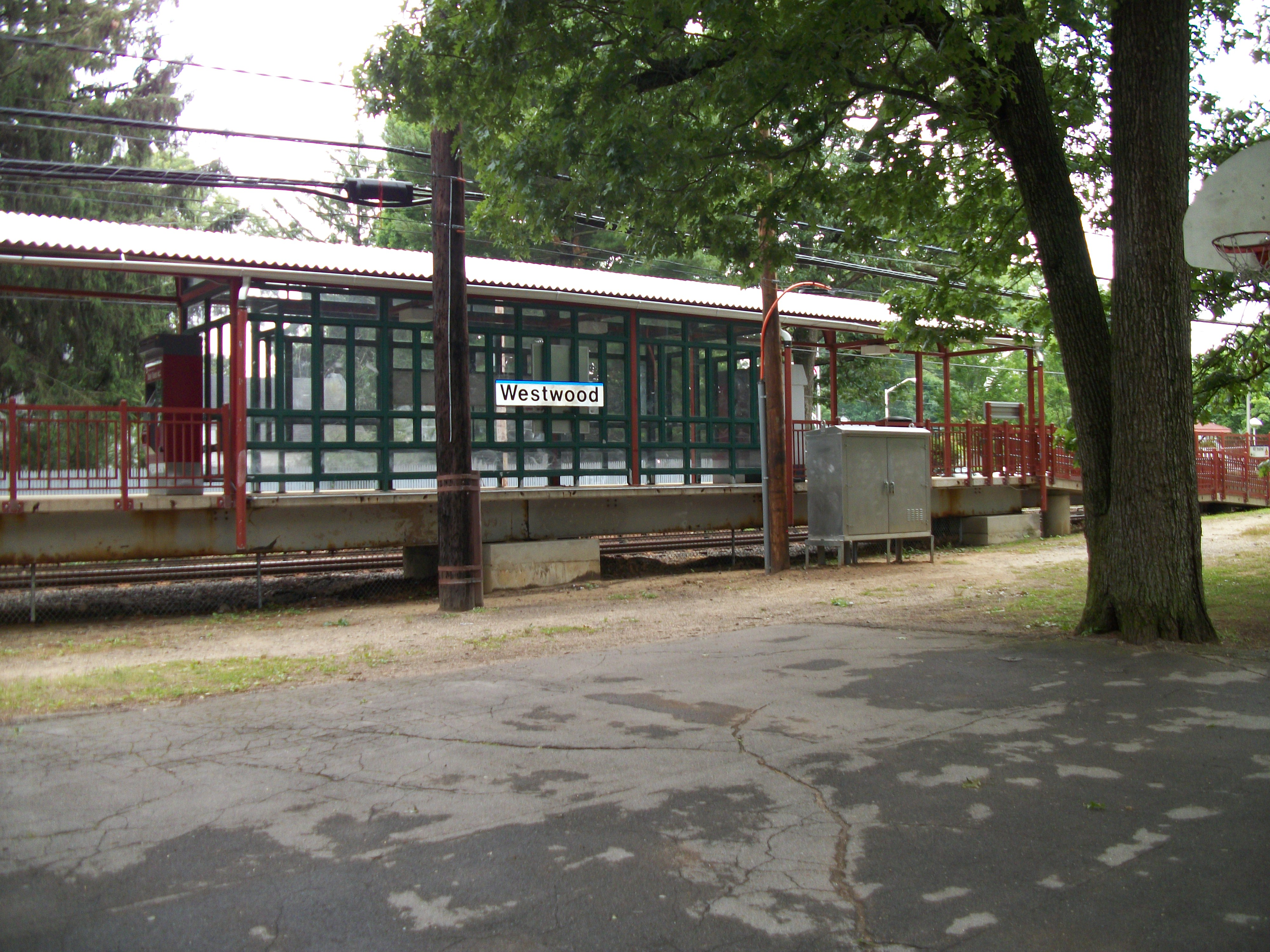
The station, as seen from an adjacent basketball court.

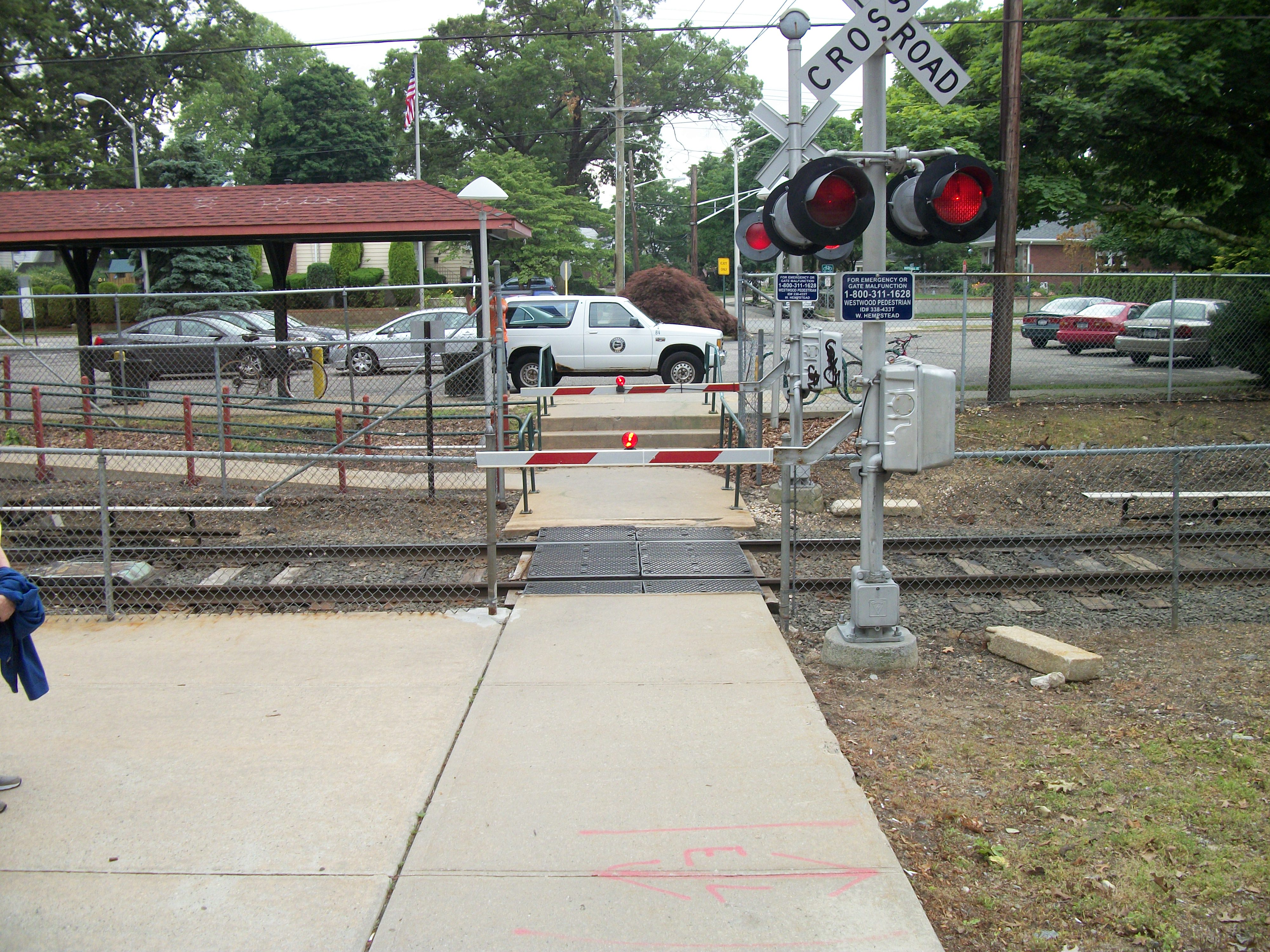
The pedestrian grade crossing at the station.

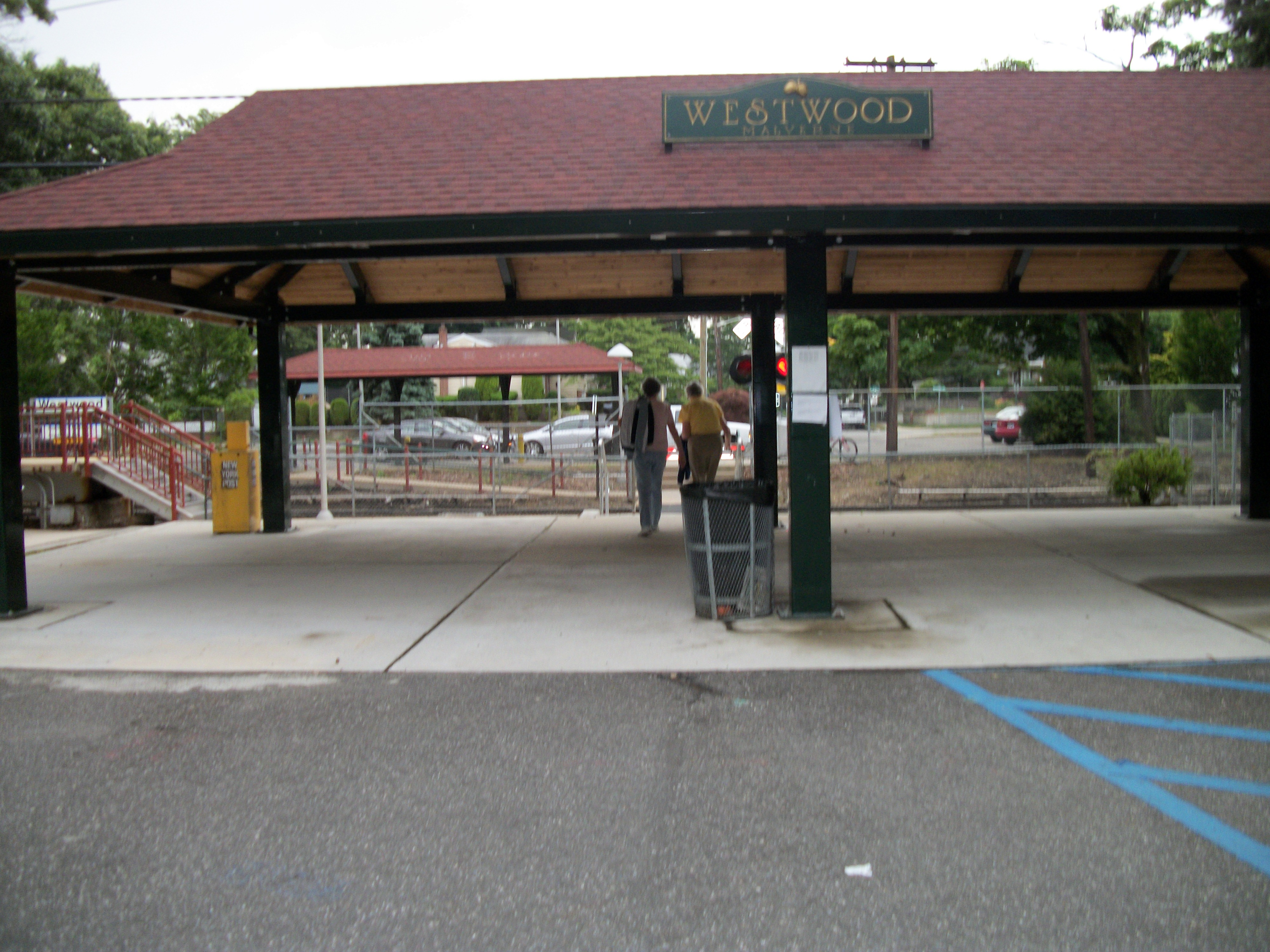
Westwood station's Malverne shelter. The Lynbrook shelter can be seen across the tracks.
