= Hempstead Lake State Park =

State park in Nassau County, New York

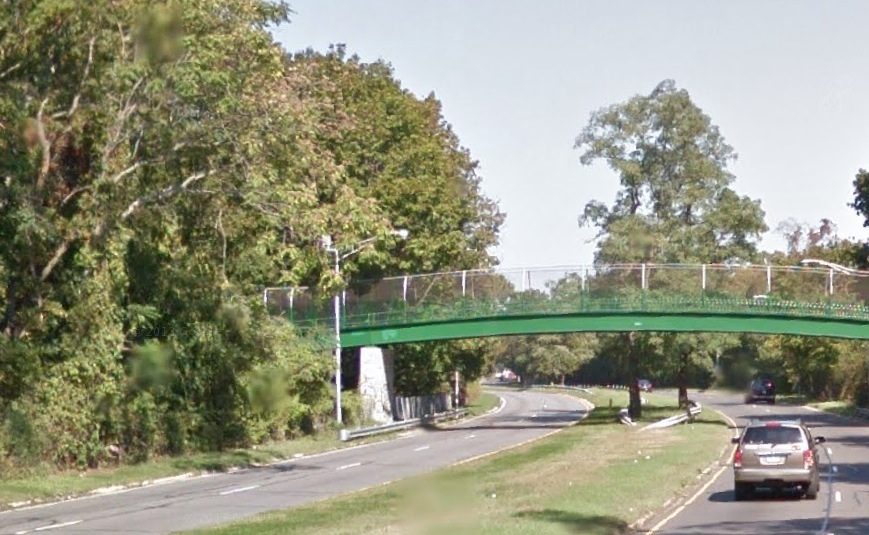
- Peninsula Boulevard, as it runs along the east edge of Hempstead Lake State Park

- Location within New York
- Type: State park
- Location: Lakeside Drive; West Hempstead, New York
- Coordinates: 40°41′02″N 73°38′24″W
- Area: 737 acres (2.98 km^{2})
- Operator: New York State Office of Parks, Recreation and Historic Preservation
- Visitors: 323,863 (in 2014)
- Open: All year
- Website: Hempstead Lake State Park

Hempstead Lake State Park is a 737-acre (2.98 km^{2}) state park located in Nassau County, New York in the United States. The park is located in West Hempstead and is one of three state parks within the Town of Hempstead. There is a quick-access entrance at exit 18 from the Southern State Parkway. The park contains the largest freshwater lake in Nassau County.

The park offers picnic tables with pavilions, tennis courts, a playground, playing fields, recreation programs, hiking, biking, a bridle path, fishing, ice fishing, ice skating, cross-country skiing, snowmobiling, and a boat launch. The park contains three ponds for fishing that are stocked with several varieties of fish. Wooded picnic areas provide shade.

== History ==
The central feature of this park is Hempstead Lake, first proposed in 1870 to supply water to Brooklyn, New York. The Mill River, also known as Hempstead Creek was dammed to form the 167-acre reservoir. Following the annexation of Brooklyn by New York City in 1898, the reservoir's use as a source of water declined.

In 1925, the route of Southern State Parkway was laid through the reservoir's grounds, and the property was designated as a state park. The highway originally looped around Hempstead Lake's southern shore between exits 18 and 19. In 1947, an earthen dam was laid across the northern third of Lake Hempstead, straightening the route of the parkway across the lake. A decade later, Peninsula Boulevard was extended along the eastern side of the park partially reusing the parkway's old route.

The reconfiguration of Southern State Parkway created two lakes from the reservoir's northern third: Northeast Pond and Northwest Pond. Excess water exiting Hempstead Lake continues into McDonald Pond and South Pond before leaving the park.

McDonald Pond, the small pond into which Mill Creek flows after leaving Hempstead Lake was officially dedicated in memory of NYPD Officer Steven McDonald on January 15, 2021.

On September 23, 2021, Governor Kathy Hochul dedicated the Environmental Education & Resiliency Center at the park, which provides displays on the natural and human history of the park.

=== "Peaches" / "Jane Doe No. 3" ===
On June 28, 1997, the dismembered torso of an unidentified young African-American woman was found at Hempstead Lake State Park, in the town of Lakeview, New York. The torso was found in a green plastic Rubbermaid container, which was dumped next to a road along the west side of the lake. Investigators reported that the victim had a tattoo on her left breast of a heart-shaped peach with a bite out of it and two drips falling from its core. In 2025, she was identified as 26-year-old Tanya Jackson.

== See also ==
- List of New York state parks
