= Malvern High School =

Malvern High School may refer to:

- Malvern High School (Arkansas), Malvern, Arkansas
- Malvern High School (Ohio), Malvern, Ohio

== See also ==
- Malverne High School, Malverne, New York
