= West Hempstead, New York =

- Hamlet and census-designated place
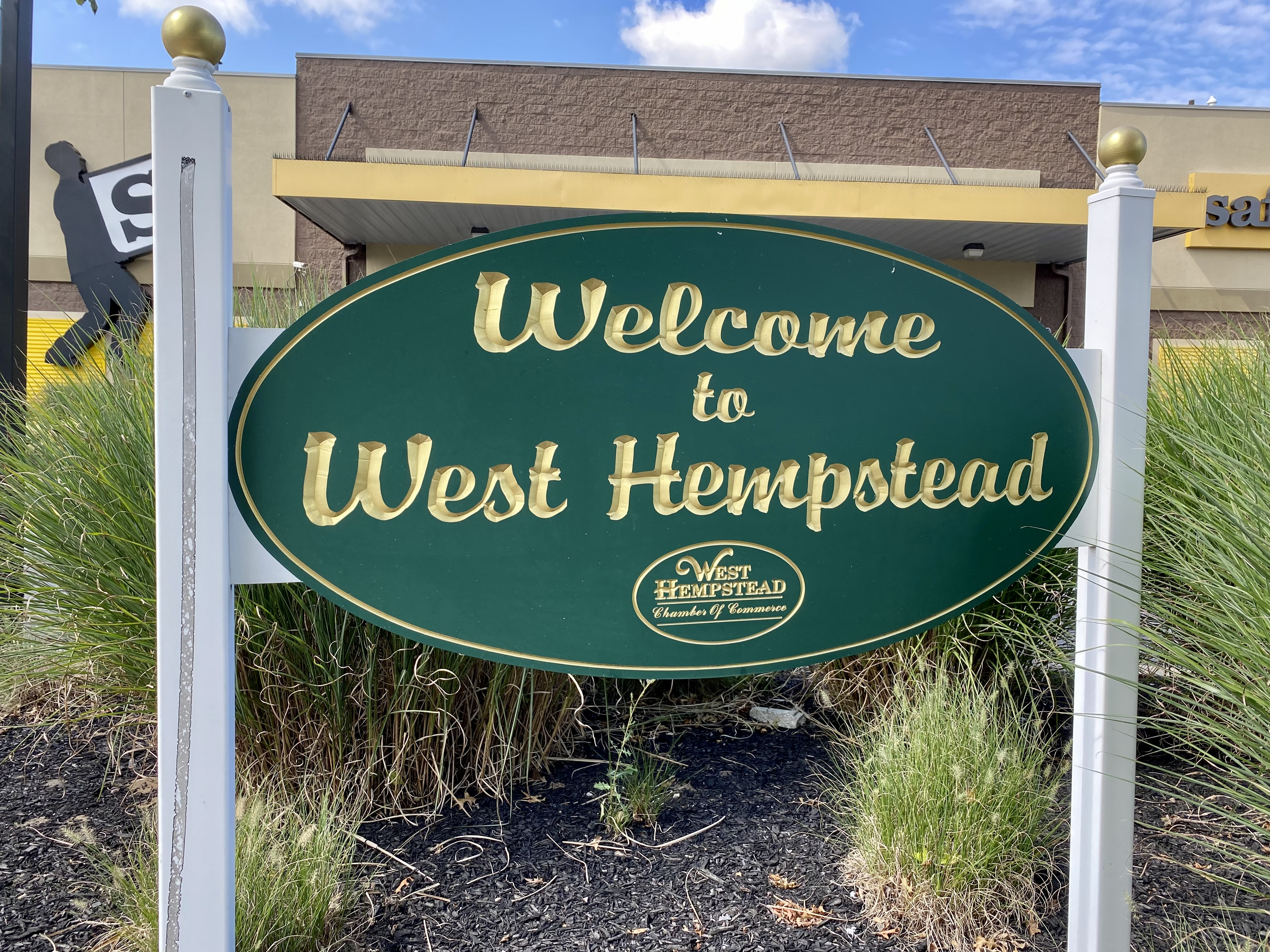
- A West Hempstead welcome sign in 2021

- Location in Nassau County and the state of New York

- Location on Long Island Location within the state of New York
- Coordinates: 40°41′47″N 73°39′9″W
- Country: United States
- State: New York
- County: Nassau
- Town: Town of Hempstead
- Named for: Its location west of the Village of Hempstead

Area
  - Total: 2.73 sq mi (7.07 km^{2})
  - Land: 2.66 sq mi (6.88 km^{2})
  - Water: 0.069 sq mi (0.18 km^{2})
- Elevation: 66 ft (20 m)

Population (2020)
  - Total: 19,835
  - Density: 7,462.9/sq mi (2,881.44/km^{2})
- Time zone: UTC-5 (Eastern (EST))
  - Summer (DST): UTC-4 (EDT)
- ZIP Codes: 11552 (West Hempstead); 11550 (Hempstead)
- Area codes: 516, 363
- FIPS code: 36-80225
- GNIS feature ID: 0969246

West Hempstead is a hamlet and census-designated place (CDP) within the Town of Hempstead in Nassau County, on Long Island, in New York, United States. The population was 19,835 at the time of the 2020 census.

It is an unincorporated area in the Town of Hempstead and is represented by Councilman Edward Ambrosino.

== History ==
West Hempstead first appeared on maps as the name of a Long Island Railroad station in 1893. There are three railroad stations within its borders: West Hempstead, Hempstead Gardens, and Lakeview. The line continues to Valley Stream where it joins the Babylon Branch. Halls Pond Park, the main park within West Hempstead, was dedicated by Nassau County in 1961. The smaller Echo Park contains a public indoor pool. Its name is derived from the community's first four little league teams: Eagles, Cardinals, Hawks, and Orioles. In 1962 they represented the east in the Senior League world series beating a team from New London, Ohio 3-2 to advance to the championship against La Habra, California. West Hempstead ended up beating them 8-2. In 1956, the West Hempstead Public Library was founded and chartered by the State in 1967. Its present 28,000 square-foot facility was completed in 2007.

In 2001, residents of West Hempstead held a nonbinding referendum on renaming the community. The vote followed a two-year effort by the West Hempstead Civic Association and the West Hempstead Chamber of Commerce to give the community a unique name, distancing itself from the neighboring crime ridden Hempstead. By a 94-vote margin, West Hempstead retained its name over the proposed Mayfair Gardens.

West Hempstead is easily accessed from the Southern State Parkway at Exit 17N and 18

The West Hempstead Union Free School District currently operates 4 schools; 1 kindergarten, 1 elementary, 1 intermediate school and 1 secondary school.

The West Hempstead Fire Department (also referred to as West Hempstead FD and abbreviated as WHFD) is the main provider of Fire Protection and Emergency Medical Services within West Hempstead.

=== Etymology ===
West Hempstead's name reflects upon the fact that it is located immediately west of the Village of Hempstead.

== Geography ==
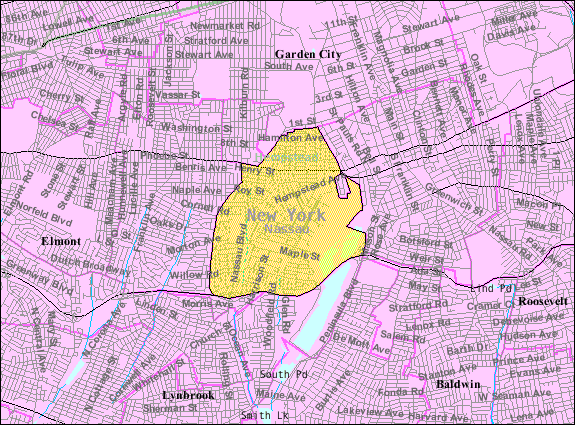
U.S. Census map of West Hempstead

According to the United States Census Bureau, the CDP has a total area of 2.8 square miles (7.3 km^{2}), of which 2.7 square miles (7.0 km^{2}) is land and 0.1 square miles (0.26 km^{2}) – or 3.64% – is water.

West Hempstead lies on a gently sloping terrain between the Hempstead Plains and the Atlantic Ocean. Pine Stream runs through the center of West Hempstead, feeding into Halls Pond. The community is bordered on the east by Hempstead Lake State Park and on the south by the Southern State Parkway.

== Demographics ==
Historical population
Census	Pop.	Note	%±
2010	18,862		—
2020	19,835		5.2%
U.S. Decennial Census

=== 2020 census ===
As of the 2020 census, West Hempstead had a population of 19,835. The median age was 39.7 years. 22.9% of residents were under the age of 18 and 16.4% of residents were 65 years of age or older. For every 100 females there were 97.3 males, and for every 100 females age 18 and over there were 94.7 males age 18 and over.

100.0% of residents lived in urban areas, while 0.0% lived in rural areas.

There were 6,093 households in West Hempstead, of which 36.5% had children under the age of 18 living in them. Of all households, 60.5% were married-couple households, 12.7% were households with a male householder and no spouse or partner present, and 22.8% were households with a female householder and no spouse or partner present. About 15.9% of all households were made up of individuals and 8.6% had someone living alone who was 65 years of age or older.

There were 6,315 housing units, of which 3.5% were vacant. The homeowner vacancy rate was 1.0% and the rental vacancy rate was 3.2%.

Racial composition as of the 2020 census
Race	Number	Percent
White	11,869	59.8%
Black or African American	2,366	11.9%
American Indian and Alaska Native	87	0.4%
Asian	1,459	7.4%
Native Hawaiian and Other Pacific Islander	5	0.0%
Some other race	2,222	11.2%
Two or more races	1,827	9.2%
Hispanic or Latino (of any race)	3,956	19.9%

=== 2010 census ===
As of the 2010 Census, there were 4,867 families residing in the West Hempstead Census Designated Place (CDP) and the population density was 7,039.1 inhabitants per square mile (2,717.8/km^{2}). There were 6,110 housing units at an average density of 2,298.3 per square mile (887.4/km^{2}).

There were 6,024 households, out of which 38.1% had children under the age of 18 living with them, 66.3% were married couples living together, 11.0% had a female householder with no husband present, and 19.2% were non-families. 15.9% of all households were made up of individuals, and 8.3% had someone living alone who was 65 years of age or older. The average household size was 3.09 and the average family size was 3.47.

The median income for a household in the CDP was $97,627 and the median income for a family was $102,481. Males had a median income of $52,391 versus $39,871 for females. The per capita income for the CDP was $32,732. About 2.4% of families and 3.7% of the population were below the poverty line, including 5.4% of those under age 18 and 3.4% of those age 65 or over.

=== Religion ===
West Hempstead, along with adjoining Franklin Square has a sizable Orthodox Jewish population that counts seven synagogues and the Hebrew Academy of Nassau County elementary school among its local institutions.

== Notable people ==
- Nathan Englander, American short story writer and novelist, was born and raised in West Hempstead.
- Kalomoira, popular Greek singer, was born in West Hempstead.
- Lucien Laurin, award-winning horse trainer and Belmont Stakes champion, lived in West Hempstead.
- Don McPherson, former NFL player
- Walt Whitman, American poet, essayist and journalist, was the headmaster of the West Hempstead-based District 17 Schoolhouse.
- Orville Wright, Inventor of powered flight, lived in West Hempstead in the early 1930s.
- Heinrich Guggenheimer, Prominent mathematician and Hebrew scholar, lived in West Hempstead later in life.

== Local activities ==
- West Hempstead Chiefs Soccer Club
- The New York Equestrian Center, Horse Riding & Boarding
- Hempstead Lake State Park
- West Hempstead Community Support Association
- West Hempstead Lions Club
- West Hempstead Chamber of Commerce
- West Hempstead Kiwanis Club
- Boy Scout Troop 240
- Cub Scout Pack 240
- Girl Scout Troop 1479

== See also ==
- South Hempstead, New York
- Hempstead (village), New York
