= West Hempstead station =

Long Island Rail Road station in Nassau County, New York

West Hempstead
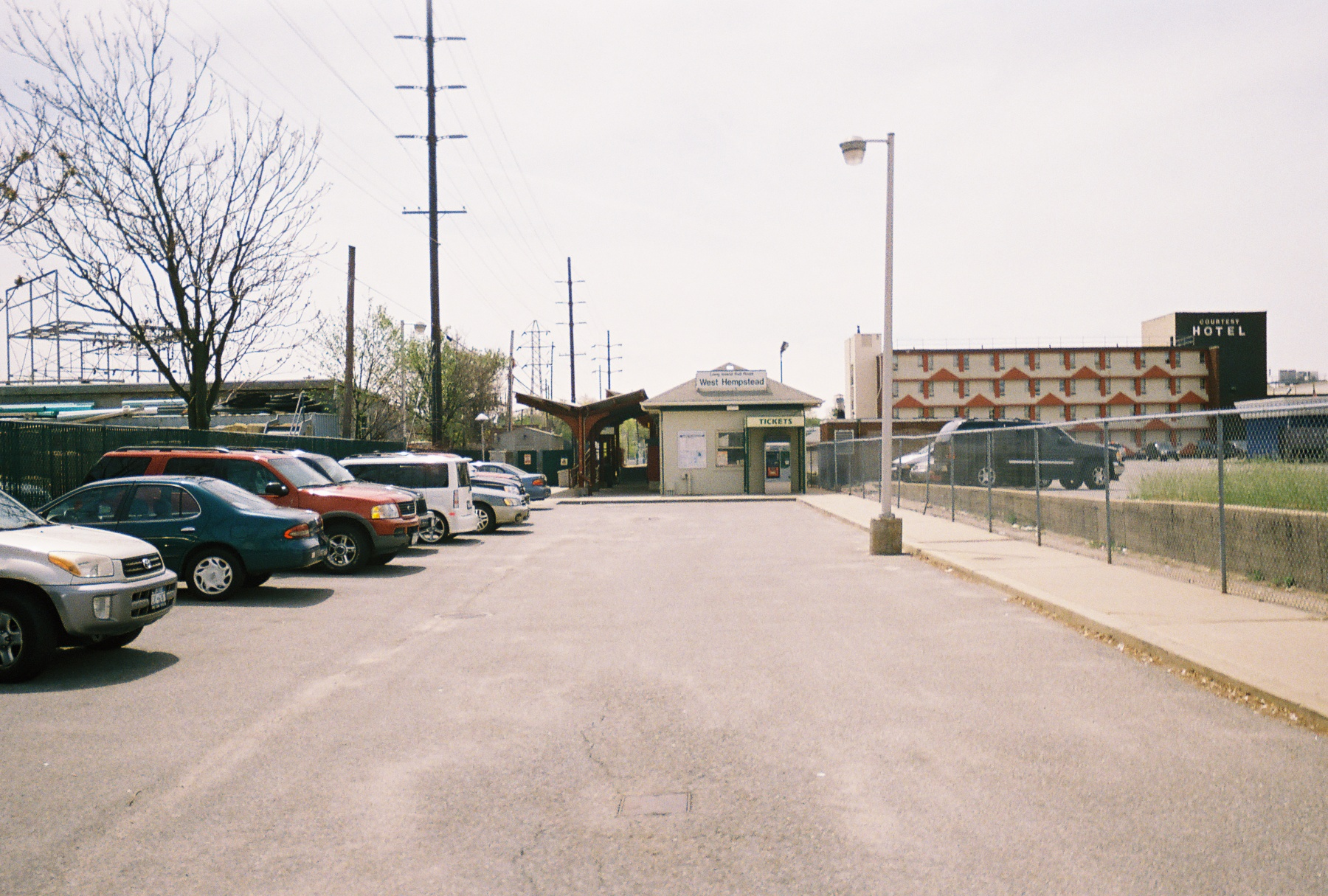
- The West Hempstead station, as seen from Hempstead Avenue in 2009

General information
- Location: Hempstead Avenue & Hempstead Gardens Drive; West Hempstead, New York
- Coordinates: 40°42′07″N 73°38′30″W
- Owner: Long Island Rail Road
- Line: West Hempstead Branch
- Distance: 4.7 mi (7.6 km) from Valley Stream
- Platforms: 1 island platform
- Tracks: 2
- Connections: Nassau Inter-County Express: n15, n31, n31x, n32

Construction
- Parking: Yes
- Accessible: Yes

Other information
- Station code: WHD
- Fare zone: 4

History
- Rebuilt: 1928, 1935, 1959, 1973, c.1995
- Electrified: October 19, 1926; 750 V (DC) third rail

Passengers
- 2012–2014: 297 per weekday

Services
Preceding station	Long Island Rail Road	Following station
Hempstead Gardens toward Penn Station, Grand Central or Atlantic Terminal	West Hempstead Branch	Terminus
Former services
Preceding station	Long Island Rail Road	Following station
Hempstead Gardens toward Valley Stream	West Hempstead Branch	Country Life Press toward Mineola
Location

West Hempstead is the terminal station at the eastern end of the Long Island Rail Road's West Hempstead Branch. It is located at Hempstead Avenue and Hempstead Gardens Drive in West Hempstead, New York – one of three stations located within the community.

== History ==
Between 1870 and 1879, the Southern Hempstead Branch of the South Side Railroad of Long Island had its terminal station located on Greenwich Street further to the east. The station and the line were abandoned in May 1879, but the station itself was converted into a skating rink that burned down in July 1888.

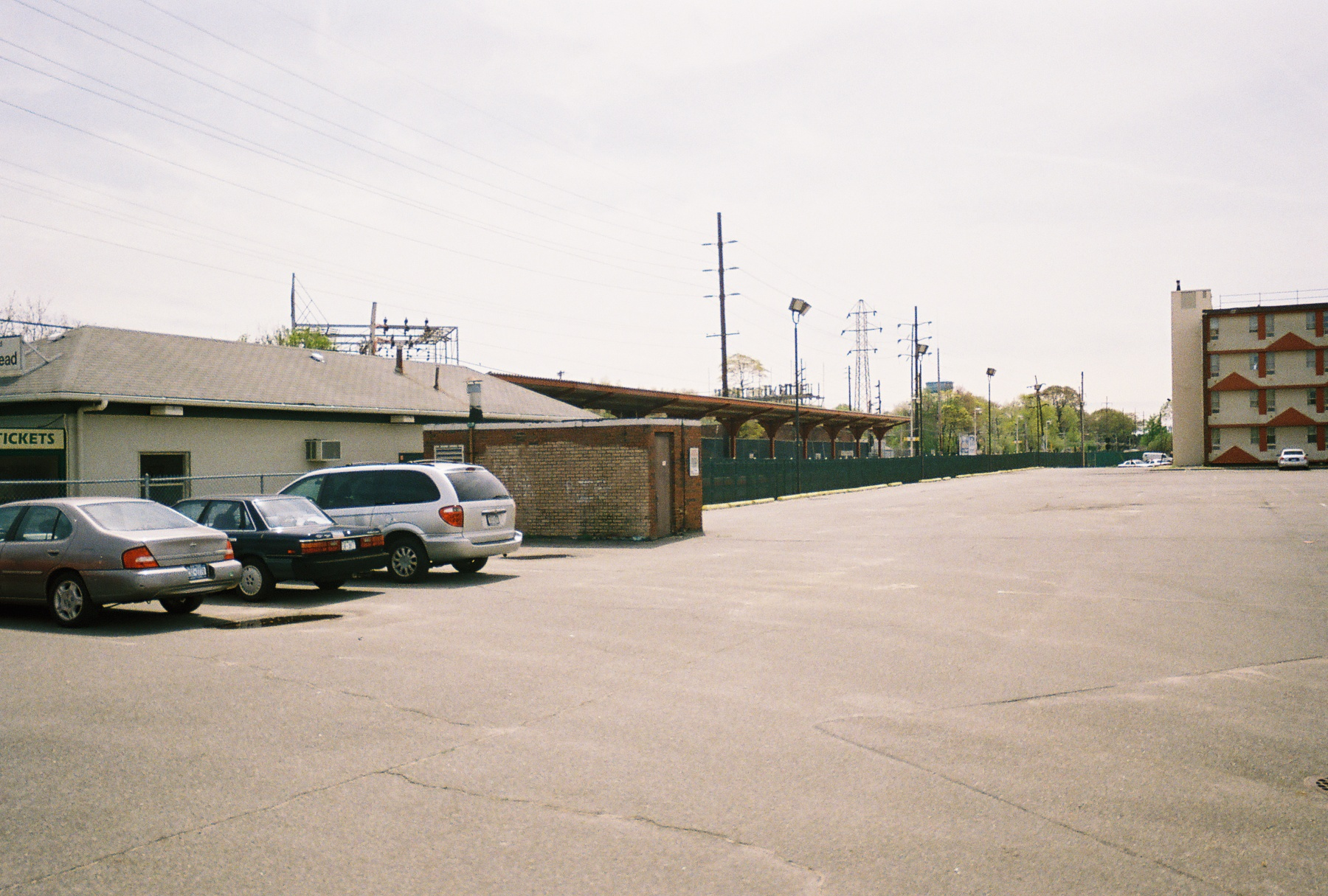
A side view of the station, as seen in 2009

In 1893, the Long Island Rail Road established a subsidiary that ran through West Hempstead between Valley Stream and Mineola called the New York Bay Extension Railroad Company, which was merged into the LIRR nine years later. A low-cinder platform station was installed between Rockaway Road (today's Hempstead Avenue) and Fulton Street (now Hempstead Turnpike), which contained a bridge over the tracks and a station for the New York and Long Island Traction Company trolleys.

In 1926, the West Hempstead Branch was electrified, and a substation built southeast of the current station site that remains to this day. The first electric train to serve the West Hempstead station ran on October 19, 1926, bound for Mineola from Penn Station.

West Hempstead Station was rebuilt in 1928 on the north side of Hempstead Avenue and relocated onto the south side of the road on September 15, 1935. The 1935 station house ran directly along a loop driveway in front of Hempstead Avenue with a canopy leading from the back door to a second canopy along the platform of the tracks. Freight spurs and team tracks spread out just south of the station, some of which ended along the south side of Hempstead Avenue. The line initially extended north and connected with the current Hempstead Branch, leading to Mineola Station, and also contained a link to the Oyster Bay Branch. It was then cut back in 1959 to its current terminus of West Hempstead. The site of the canopy along the tracks was replaced with the current brick structure, and the yards along the northwest side of the tracks were replaced by the Courtesy Hotel, which was torn down in 2011 and replaced by a group of apartment buildings.

A new, high level platform was constructed at the station in 1973 to replace the existing, ground level platform and enable level boarding; prior to this, the West Hempstead station was unable to be served by the LIRR's then-new M1 railcars, which required high level platforms.

The station was rebuilt in its current form in the mid-1990s. As part of the project, the platform was rebuilt with a new canopy, railings, and furnishings – and a ramp between the platform and the parking lot was added to make the station compliant with the Americans with Disabilities Act of 1990.

== Station layout ==
This station has one six-car-long island platform between the two tracks. The mostly single-tracked West Hempstead Branch expands to two tracks north of the previous station.
