= Malverne, New York =

- Village
- Incorporated Village of Malverne
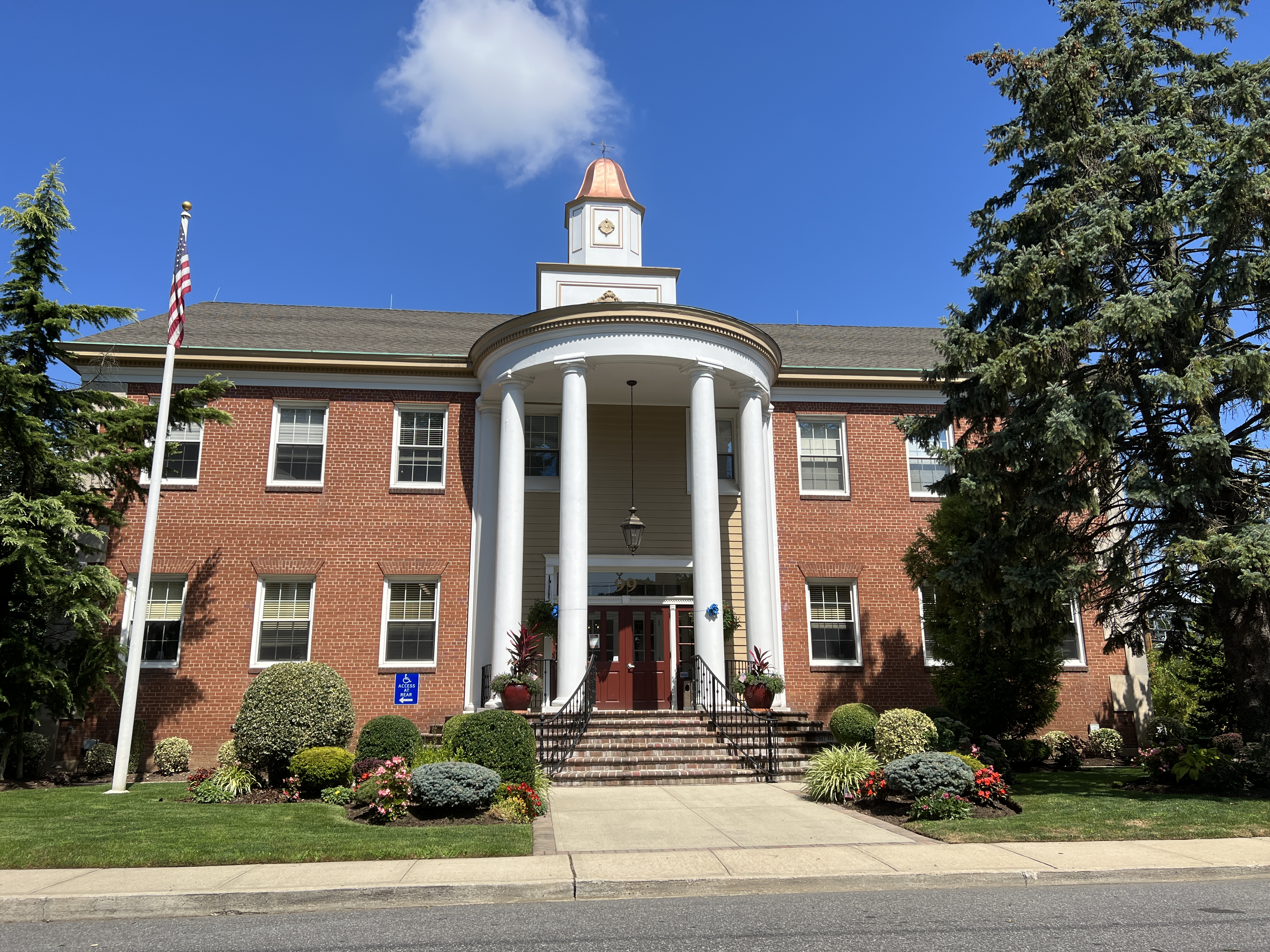
- Malverne Village Hall in 2022

- Seal
- Nickname: "The Mayberry of Long Island"
- Motto: "Oaks From Acorns"
- Location in Nassau County and the state of New York

- Location on Long Island Location within the state of New York
- Coordinates: 40°40′31″N 73°40′23″W
- Country: United States
- State: New York
- County: Nassau
- Town: Hempstead
- Incorporated: April 20, 1921
- Named for: Malvern, England

Government
  - Mayor: Timothy Sullivan
  - Deputy Mayor: Scott Edwards

Area
  - Total: 1.06 sq mi (2.74 km^{2})
  - Land: 1.06 sq mi (2.74 km^{2})
  - Water: 0 sq mi (0.00 km^{2})
- Elevation: 36 ft (11 m)

Population (2020)
  - Total: 8,560
  - Density: 8,091.2/sq mi (3,124.03/km^{2})
- Time zone: UTC-5 (Eastern (EST))
  - Summer (DST): UTC-4 (EDT)
- ZIP code: 11565
- Area codes: 516, 363
- FIPS code: 36-44787
- GNIS feature ID: 0956328
- Website: www.malvernevillage.gov

Malverne is a village in the Town of Hempstead in Nassau County, on Long Island, in New York, United States. The population was 8,560 at the time of the 2020 census.

== Geography ==
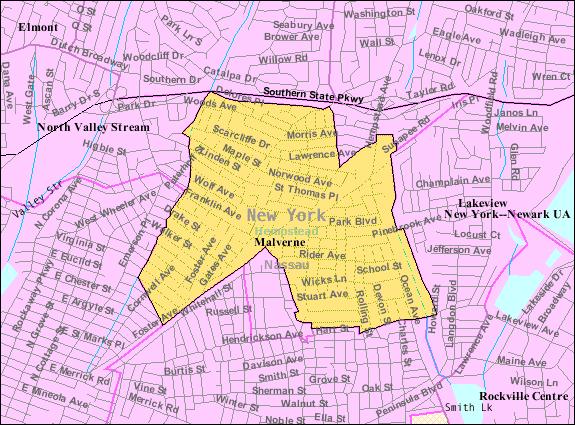
U.S. Census map of Malverne.

According to the United States Census Bureau, the village has a total area of 1.0 square mile (2.6 km^{2}), all land.

== History ==
Malverne was originally settled by the Rockaway Indians at an unknown point in history, with the current Ocean Avenue serving as an Indian path. Western settlements can be dated back to the 1700s, when the Abrams, Bedell and Pearsall families first settled and began farming the area.

Norwood, as it was originally known, formed a movement to become an incorporated village in the early 1920s. This area originally consisted of the communities of North Lynbrook and Malverne Park Oaks. It is widely believed that residents of the now Malverne Park Oaks area did not wish to become part of the new village and therefore requested not to be included. North Lynbrook was believed to be removed from the borders by then New York Lieutenant Governor Jeremiah Wood, who lived in that area at that time and did not wish to be in an incorporated village.

A vote was taken and voters decided to form an incorporated village by an overwhelming majority.

The spelling of the name was originally Malvern, minus the "e" as in the English connection. There is no accepted reason for the addition of the "e", but some notable theories include a typo from the Long Island Rail Road and, simply, a desire to have a unique name. The last farm in Malverne, Crossroads Farm at Grossman's was acquired by Nassau County and continues to operate as the last working farm in the village.

The name was changed from Norwood to Malverne because a Village of Norwood already existed in upstate New York. The name Malverne originates from Malvern, England. Alfred Wagg, the main developers from the Amsterdam Development and Land Corporation, had visited Malvern and liked the name.

Malverne's incorporation was finalized on April 13, 1921; however, it had been acting as a village since October 1920.

Malverne was originally made up of many different communities (under one incorporated village). The communities were mostly made up of the original farmer of that area and those he sold his land to. While it is no longer viewed the same way, some of the neighborhood names can be found in the street names.

The village's growth has been credited to two major events – the selling of farmland for development and the Long Island Rail Road. The Amsterdam Development Corporation is responsible for the building of many of the homes in the village. Today, there are over 3000 homes in the village.

Today, many of its residents commute to New York City via the two Long Island Rail Road stations in the village – Malverne and Westwood, both located on the West Hempstead Branch. After a three-year hiatus, weekend train service was restored to the branch in November 2014.

== Demographics ==
Historical population
Census	Pop.	Note	%±
1930	2,256		—
1940	5,153		128.4%
1950	8,086		56.9%
1960	9,988		23.5%
1970	10,036		0.5%
1980	9,262		−7.7%
1990	9,054		−2.2%
2000	8,934		−1.3%
2010	8,514		−4.7%
2020	8,560		0.5%
U.S. Decennial Census

=== Racial and ethnic composition ===
Malverne village, New York – Racial and ethnic composition Note: the US Census treats Hispanic/Latino as an ethnic category. This table excludes Latinos from the racial categories and assigns them to a separate category. Hispanics/Latinos may be of any race.
Race / Ethnicity (NH = Non-Hispanic)	Pop 2000	Pop 2010	Pop 2020	% 2000	% 2010	% 2020
White alone (NH)	7,887	7,066	6,163	88.28%	82.99%	72.00%
Black or African American alone (NH)	144	260	464	1.61%	3.05%	5.42%
Native American or Alaska Native alone (NH)	3	4	11	0.03%	0.05%	0.13%
Asian alone (NH)	273	354	488	3.06%	4.16%	5.70%
Native Hawaiian or Pacific Islander alone (NH)	0	1	0	0.00%	0.01%	0.00%
Other race alone (NH)	11	22	109	0.12%	0.26%	1.27%
Mixed race or Multiracial (NH)	79	71	209	0.88%	0.83%	2.44%
Hispanic or Latino (any race)	537	736	1,116	6.01%	8.64%	13.04%
Total	8,934	8,514	8,560	100.00%	100.00%	100.00%

=== 2020 census ===
As of the 2020 census, Malverne had a population of 8,560. The median age was 46.6 years. 19.1% of residents were under the age of 18 and 22.1% were 65 years of age or older. For every 100 females, there were 93.7 males, and for every 100 females age 18 and over, there were 91.1 males age 18 and over.

100.0% of residents lived in urban areas, while 0.0% lived in rural areas.

There were 3,068 households in Malverne, of which 30.8% had children under the age of 18 living in them. Of all households, 65.5% were married-couple households, 10.2% were households with a male householder and no spouse or partner present, and 20.5% were households with a female householder and no spouse or partner present. About 17.7% of all households were made up of individuals, and 11.2% had someone living alone who was 65 years of age or older.

There were 3,159 housing units, of which 2.9% were vacant. The homeowner vacancy rate was 0.8% and the rental vacancy rate was 3.9%.

=== 2010 census ===
As of the 2010 census the makeup of the village population was 88.4% White 83% Non-Hispanic White, 3.3% African American, 0.16% Native American, 4.2% Asian, 1.77% from other races, and 1.4% from two or more races. Hispanic or Latino of any race were 8.6% of the population.

=== 2000 census ===
As of the census of 2000, there were 8,934 people, 3,106 households, and 2,534 families residing in the village. The population density was 8,499.1 inhabitants per square mile (3,281.5/km^{2}). There were 3,152 housing units at an average density of 2,998.5 per square mile (1,157.7/km^{2}). The racial makeup of the village was 92.04% White, 1.72% African American, 0.16% Native American, 3.10% Asian, 1.77% from other races, and 1.21% from two or more races. Hispanic or Latino of any race were 6.01% of the population.

There were 3,106 households, out of which 34.1% had children under the age of 18 living with them, 70.2% were married couples living together, 8.5% had a female householder with no husband present, and 18.4% were non-families. 15.2% of all households were made up of individuals, and 8.8% had someone living alone who was 65 years of age or older. The average household size was 2.87 and the average family size was 3.21.

In the village, the population was spread out, with 23.1% under the age of 18, 6.5% from 18 to 24, 26.9% from 25 to 44, 27.8% from 45 to 64, and 15.6% who were 65 years of age or older. The median age was 41 years. For every 100 females, there were 93.5 males. For every 100 females age 18 and over, there were 88.5 males.

The median income for a household in the village was $81,784, and the median income for a family was $87,197. Males had a median income of $53,077 versus $37,743 for females. The per capita income for the village was $31,418. About 1.0% of families and 1.6% of the population were below the poverty line, including 0.7% of those under age 18 and 3.5% of those age 65 or over.

== Government ==
The village is governed by a board of trustees of which the mayor sits as the chair. Each member of the board is elected to a four-year term of office. There is also a village judge that presides over violations of the village code. Elections are scheduled for the third Tuesday of March in odd numbered years.

The mayor appoints a deputy mayor to act in their absence. They also appoint liaisons and/or commissioners to each department in the village. The office of mayor was originally called president.

Malverne is a "full service" municipality with nearly all government services provided by the village itself. The Village hosts its own Police Department, Volunteer Fire Department (Norwood Hook, Ladder & Hose Company), Volunteer Ambulance Corps, Police Reserve, Department of Public Works, Emergency Management Commission, Public Library, Youth Board, and village television station – MalverneTV.

=== Safety record ===
Recent studies have found that Malverne is considered to be one of the safest communities in both the state and country. A report based on 2012 statistics place the village the second-safest in New York, behind only Briarcliff Manor.

=== Finances ===
In 2009, Standard & Poor's gave Malverne an AA+ credit bond rating, one of the highest ratings the financial institution gives out.

== Education ==
Part of Malverne is in Malverne Union Free School District. Another part is in Valley Stream 13 Union Free School District and Valley Stream Central High School District. Malverne High School is the sole high school in Malverne Union Free School District.

== Notable people ==
- Jason Michael Brescia – writer and director
- Gil Clancy – legendary boxing trainer, commentator and International Boxing Hall of Famer
- Tony Danza – actor
- Francis T. Purcell – former Nassau County Executive
- Ralph Flanagan – big-band leader
- Woody Gelman – publisher
- Jeffrey Goldberg – author and staff writer for The Atlantic Monthly
- Ray Heatherton - stage and TV personality (The Merry Mailman), father of Joey Heatherton
- Max Holden – magician
- Dan Ingram – radio DJ
- Stan MacGovern – comic strip cartoonist (Silly Milly)
- Steven McDonald (1957–2017) – NYPD shooting victim, writer and speaker
- Ole Olsen – Olsen and Johnson comedy team
- Ralph Penza – television journalist
- Atoosa Rubenstein – magazine editor
- Rudy Rufer – New York Giants baseball shortstop
- Frank Scoblete – author
- Rick Shutter – drummer
- Frank Springer – cartoonist
- Charley Steiner – former ESPN sportscaster, current play-by-play voice for Los Angeles Dodgers
- Anthony Tommasini (born 1948) – music critic and author
- George R. Wodicka – biomedical engineering educator, researcher, entrepreneur, and academic administrator
