= Malvern (Charlottesville, Virginia) =

Historic house in Virginia, United States

- U.S. National Register of Historic Places
- Virginia Landmarks Register
- 1982 drawing

- Location within Virginia Location within the United States
- Location: VA 708 west side, 1,250 feet (380 m) north of the junction with VA 637, near Charlottesville, Virginia
- Coordinates: 38°01′46″N 78°38′21″W
- Area: 9.1 acres (3.7 ha)
- Built: 1801-1820
- Architectural style: Federal
- NRHP reference No.: 95000974
- VLR No.: 002-0092

Significant dates
- Added to NRHP: August 4, 1995
- Designated VLR: April 28, 1995

Malvern, also known as Oaklands, is a historic home and farm located near Charlottesville, Albemarle County, Virginia. It was built between 1801 and 1820, and is a two-story, three-bay, gable-roofed, brick house in the Federal style. The interior features a side-passage plan on both floors.

It was added to the National Register of Historic Places in 1995.
