= Malvern Festival =

Malvern Festival may refer to:

- The Malvern Festival (1929-1939)
- Malvern Fringe Festival
