= Malvern (surname) =

Malvern is a surname. Notable people with the surname include:

- Corinne Malvern (1904–1956), American commercial artist
- Gladys Malvern (1897–1962), American vaudeville and Broadway actress, radio script writer, and author
- John Malvern (died 1442), Canon of Windsor
- Scott Malvern (born 1989), British racing driver
