= Southern Hempstead Branch =

Rail line in Nassau County, New York, US

Overview
- Status: Abandoned
- Owner: Long Island Rail Road
- Locale: Long Island, New York, US
- Termini: Valley Stream; Hempstead
- Stations: 5

Service
- System: Long Island Rail Road
- Operator: Long Island Rail Road

History
- Opened: 1870
- Closed: May 1879

Technical
- Number of tracks: 1
- Track gauge: 4 ft 8 1/2 in (1,435 mm)

The Southern Hempstead Branch was a branch of the Long Island Rail Road from Valley Stream to Hempstead. It was established in 1870 and abandoned in May 1879, and is not the same route as the current West Hempstead Branch.

== History ==
Hempstead residents were annoyed with the bad service provided by the LIRR on their Hempstead Branch, and planned the New York and Hempstead Plains Railroad, which was to cross the South Side Railroad at Valley Stream and end at the 65th Street Ferry in Bay Ridge, Brooklyn, but only built east of Valley Stream. Prior to the establishment of the NY&H, the SSRLI established a short-lived subsidiary named the Hempstead and Rockaway Railroad designed to connect the Far Rockaway Branch Railroad to the Southern Hempstead Branch. The H&R was dissolved in 1871. There were also plans to extend the line eastward into what is today North Massapequa. Reliant on the South Side, the two companies often shared equipment. A railroad supplier named Pusey became president in 1871, but failed to do what he had promised and was soon discharged. Without notifying the company, the bondholders illegally appointed receiver Seaman Snediker, a friend of Pusey's, under foreclosure, and they took the railroad on January 8, 1872. The owners discovered this the next morning and took control of the railroad's only locomotive and two cars had been taken away by bank creditors. The South Side leased the NY&HP in June 1873.

The railroad left the South Side Valley Stream station at Fifth Street and struck out northeastward. It crossed Franklin Avenue, Malverne, close to the present little stream between Wheeler Avenue and Cornwell Avenue; here was situated the little hamlet and station of Bridgeport. The track then paralleled Cornwell Avenue exactly, crossing Hempstead Avenue, where was located the tiny settlement and station of Norwood. The Pine Brook was crossed on a little bridge only a foot or two above water level. At Woodfield Avenue and Oak Place was Woodfield depot. Immediately to the east the track crossed the Schodack Brook on an embankment and culvert about five or six feet above the stream bed. As the track approached Hempstead village, it crossed the Horse Brook or Rockaway Brook on a small bridge and then paralleled the brook a few blocks, terminating at a little station on the west side of Greenwich Street midway between Front Street and Prospect Street. Here there was a short stretch of double track but no turntable. Service was maintained with about six trains a day in each direction.

== Stations ==
The entire line was abandoned in 1879.

Station	Miles (km) to Penn Station	Date opened	Date closed	Connections / notes
Montauk Branch diverges
Valley Stream	17.9 (28.8)	June 1869		LIRR: Babylon, Far Rockaway. Long Beach, and West Hempstead Branches; NICE Bus: N1, N2
Bridgeport		1870	1879	Located on Franklin Avenue
Norwood		1870	1879	Located on Franklin Avenue
Woodfield		1870	1879	Located on Hempstead Avenue
Hempstead		1870	1879	Located on Greenwich Street
