= Valley Stream station =

Long Island Rail Road station in Nassau County, New York

Valley Stream
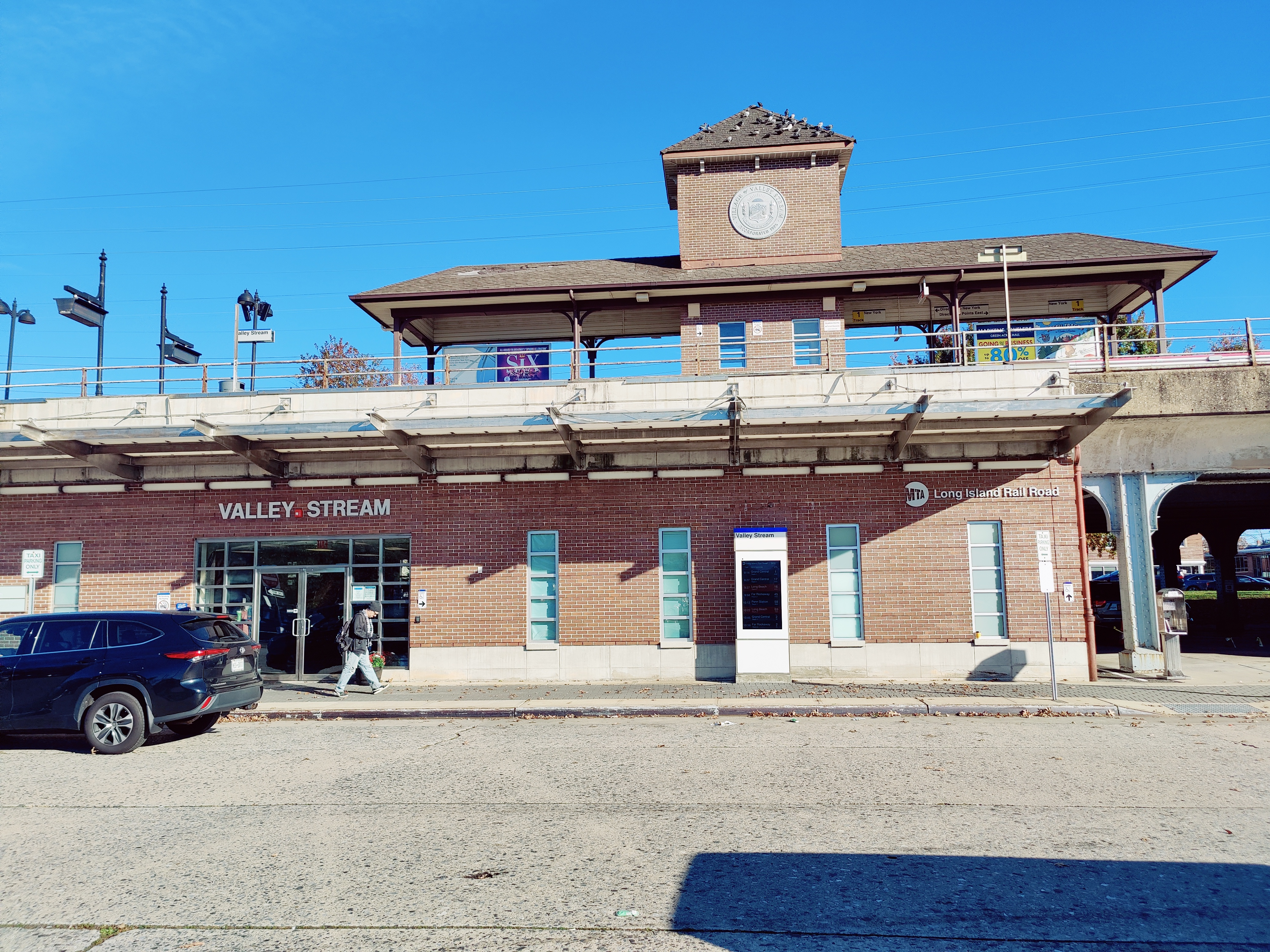
- The station in 2023, as seen from the parking lot.

General information
- Location: Franklin Avenue & Sunrise Highway; Valley Stream, New York
- Coordinates: 40.661483°N 73.704679°W
- Owner: Long Island Rail Road
- Lines: Atlantic Branch; Far Rockaway Branch; Montauk Branch; West Hempstead Branch; Long Beach Branch
- Distance: 15.7 mi (25.3 km) from Atlantic Terminal; 16.1 mi (25.9 km) from Long Island City
- Platforms: 1 island platform
- Tracks: 2 (Atlantic Branch), 2 (Montauk Branch)
- Connections: Nassau Inter-County Express: n1, Elmont Flexi

Construction
- Parking: Yes
- Cycle facilities: Yes
- Accessible: Yes

Other information
- Station code: VSM
- Fare zone: 4

History
- Opened: June 1869 (SSRRLI)
- Rebuilt: 1933
- Electrified: December 11, 1905; 750 V (DC) third rail

Passengers
- 2012–2014: 7,816 per weekday
- Rank: 12

Services
| Preceding station | Long Island Rail Road | Following station |
|---|---|---|
| Rosedale toward Penn Station or Grand Central | Far Rockaway Branch | Gibson toward Far Rockaway |
| Rosedale toward Penn Station or Grand Central | Long Beach Branch | Lynbrook toward Long Beach |
Former services
| Preceding station | Long Island Rail Road | Following station |
|---|---|---|
| Rosedale toward Long Island City | Montauk Division | Lynbrook toward Montauk |
| Rosedale toward Flatbush Avenue | Atlantic Division | Terminus |
| Terminus | Far Rockaway Branch | Gibson toward Hammels |
| Terminus | West Hempstead Branch | Westwood toward Mineola |
Location

Valley Stream is a train station located on the Atlantic Branch of the Long Island Rail Road, in the Incorporated Village of Valley Stream, in Nassau County, New York.

== Description ==
Valley Stream is the westernmost station on the Atlantic Branch in Nassau County. The station is located at Franklin Avenue and Sunrise Highway, west of Rockaway Avenue. It is wheelchair-accessible with an elevator from street level; parking facilities and taxis are available.

Valley Stream is served by Far Rockaway Branch and Long Beach Branch as of February 27, 2023. West Hempstead Branch trains previously stopped at this station. The tracks of the Montauk Branch pass through the station north of the Atlantic Branch tracks. Directly east of the station, the Atlantic Branch ends and splits into the Long Beach Branch and Far Rockaway Branch, while the West Hempstead Branch splits from the Montauk Branch.

== History ==
The first Valley Stream station was built by the South Side Railroad of Long Island on October 28, 1867. The station house itself opened in July 1869 with the opening of the Far Rockaway Branch, and was built as a Swiss chalet style station house inside the legs of an old wye. It also served customers of the Southern Hempstead Branch which was built by the short-lived New York and Hempstead Plains Railroad between 1871 and 1900. Along with the rest of the SSRRLI, the station was acquired by the Long Island Rail Road in 1889. In 1893 the station began to serve trains along the West Hempstead Branch. When Nassau County separated from Queens in 1899, Valley Stream station became the first station in Nassau County along the Montauk Branch. The station was electrified with the rest of the Far Rockaway Branch in 1905. Electrification of Long Beach Branch was completed in 1910, and the following year, the Long Beach Branch became an extension of the Atlantic Branch as two new tracks were built between Valley Stream and Lynbrook.

In 1933, the original station was razed as part of a grade crossing elimination project along the Atlantic and Montauk branches. Prior to this, a temporary station was relocated on a shoo-fly north of the former station on August 10, 1932, then moved to another one south of the former station on August 31 of the same year. The third elevated center-island structure that exists today was opened north of the former location on February 7, 1933 – and the wye was removed as part of the reconstruction.

In the late 2010s, the station received upgrades and new features as part of the MTA's Enhanced Station Initiative – including Wi-Fi, digital display kiosks, LED lighting, station artwork, charging stations, and other new waiting room and platform features.

Following the opening of Grand Central Madison in early 2023 and the resulting service changes, it was announced that West Hempstead Branch trains would no longer stop at Valley Stream, while the Far Rockaway and Long Beach Branches would continue serving it – a pattern which remains today.

=== Clear Stream station ===
Shortly after electrical service of the Far Rockaway Branch was established, the LIRR created a new station west of Valley Stream at Clear Stream Road (now Avenue) called Clear Stream. It opened in 1906 and was used only for rush hour service. The station was eliminated after 1910.

== Station layout ==
An eight-car-long island platform is located between the two Atlantic Branch tracks, 1 and 2. The two bypass tracks located to the north are part of the Montauk Branch.
