= History of the New York City Subway (1940–present) =

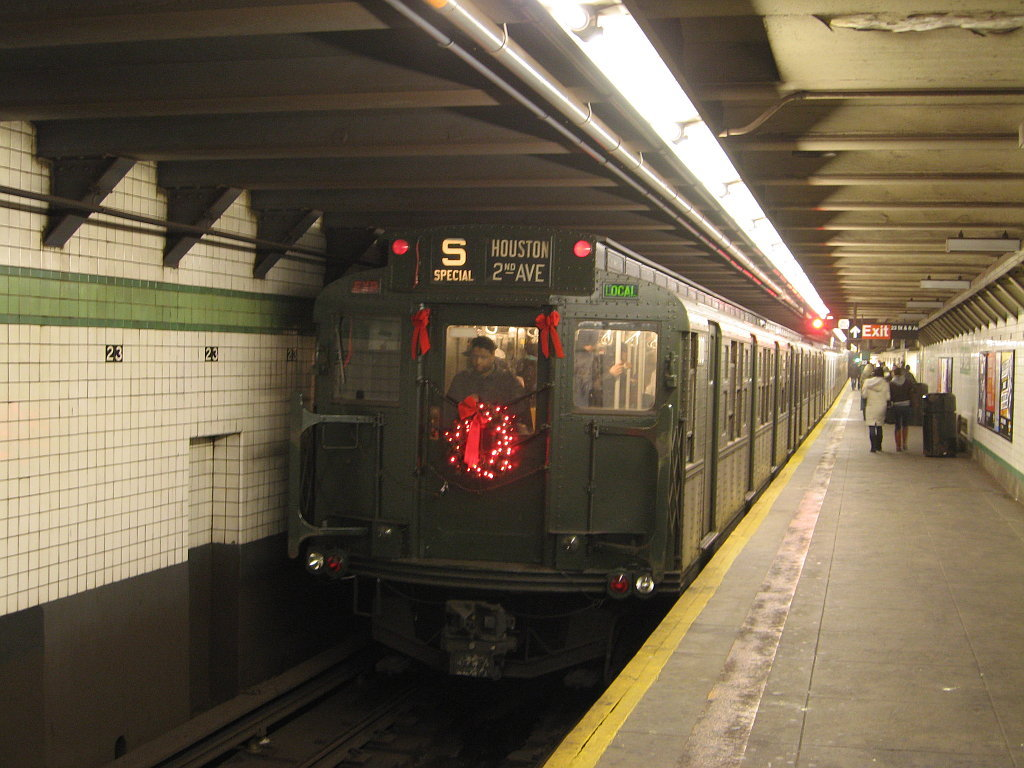
New York City Subway R1 car at the 23rd Street station, on a holiday train special in December 2007

Annual passenger ridership
Year	Passengers	%±
1901	253,000,000	—
1905	448,000,000	+77.1%
1910	725,000,000	+61.8%
1915	830,000,000	+14.5%
1920	1,332,000,000	+60.5%
1925	1,681,000,000	+26.2%
1930	2,049,000,000	+21.9%
1935	1,817,000,000	−11.3%
1940	1,857,000,000	+2.2%
1945	1,941,000,000	+4.5%
1946	2,067,000,000	+6.5%
1950	1,681,000,000	−13.4%
1955	1,378,000,000	−18.0%
1960	1,345,000,000	−2.4%
1965	1,363,000,000	+1.3%
1970	1,258,000,000	−7.7%
1975	1,054,000,000	−16.2%
1980	1,009,000,000	−4.3%
1982	989,000,000	−2.0%
1985	1,010,000,000	+2.1%
1990	1,028,000,000	+1.8%
1995	1,093,000,000	+6.3%
2000	1,400,000,000	+28.1%
2005	1,450,000,000	+3.6%
2010	1,605,000,000	+10.7%
2011	1,640,000,000	+2.2%
2012	1,654,000,000	+0.1%
2013	1,708,000,000	+3.3%
2014	1,751,287,621	+2.6%
2015	1,762,565,419	+0.6%
2016	1,756,814,800	-0.3%
2017	1,727,366,607	-1.7%
2018	1,680,060,402	-2.7%
2019	1,697,787,002	+1.1%
2020	639,541,029	-62.3%
2021	759,976,721	+18.8%
2022	1,013,425,465	+33.3%
2023	1,151,998,158	+13.7%
2024	1,194,866,357	+3.7%
2025	1,281,883,361	+7.6%

The New York City Subway is a rapid transit system that serves four of the five boroughs of New York City, New York: the Bronx, Brooklyn, Manhattan, and Queens. Its operator is the New York City Transit Authority (NYCTA), which is controlled by the Metropolitan Transportation Authority (MTA) of New York. In 2016, an average of 5.66 million passengers used the system daily, making it the busiest rapid transit system in the United States and the seventh busiest in the world.

The city took over running the entire system in 1940. Previously, two thirds of the system were privately operated systems: the Brooklyn–Manhattan Transit Corporation (BMT) and the Interborough Rapid Transit Company (IRT); the city had controlled the other third, the Independent Subway System (IND), since its inception in 1932. Some elevated lines closed immediately while others closed soon after. Integration was slow, but several connections were built between the IND and BMT, which now operate as one division called the B Division. Since IRT infrastructure is too small for B Division cars, it remains as the A Division.

The NYCTA, a public authority presided over by New York City, was created in 1953 to take over subway, bus, and streetcar operations from the city. In 1968 the state-level MTA took control of the NYCTA, and in 1970 the city entered the New York City fiscal crisis. It closed many elevated subway lines that became too expensive to maintain. Graffiti, crime, and decrepitude became common. To stay solvent, the New York City Subway had to make many service cutbacks and defer necessary maintenance projects. In the 1980s an $18 billion financing program for the rehabilitation of the subway began.

The September 11 attacks resulted in service disruptions. Since the 2000s, expansions include the 7 Subway Extension that opened in September 2015, and the Second Avenue Subway, the first phase of which opened on January 1, 2017. However, at the same time, under-investment in the subway system led to a transit crisis that peaked in 2017.

After the IND Sixth Avenue Line was completed, only 28 new stations were built. Five stations were on the abandoned NYW&B-operated IRT Dyre Avenue Line, fourteen stations were on the abandoned LIRR Rockaway Beach Branch (now the IND Rockaway Line), six were on the Archer Avenue Lines and 63rd Street Lines (built as part of a 1968 plan), two stations (57th Street and Grand Street) were part of the Chrystie Street Connection, and the Harlem–148th Street terminal. Four MTA Capital Construction-funded stations (the 34th Street station on the 7 Subway Extension and the three stations on the Second Avenue Subway) have been constructed with up to 14 more planned. The city's subway construction costs are the highest in the world, which has slowed the pace of expansion.

== Unification ==
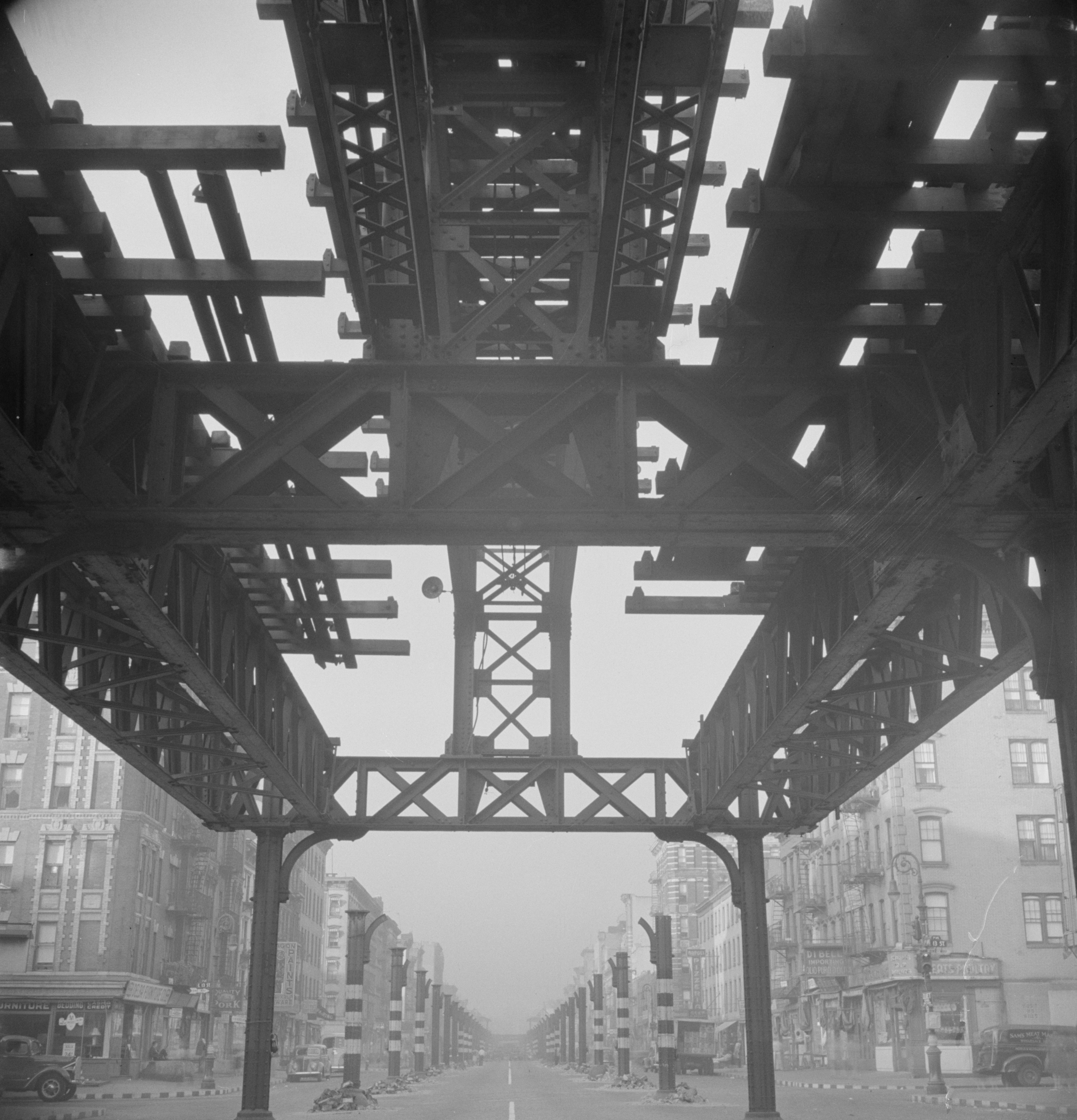
The IRT Second Avenue Line, being demolished shortly after unification, 1942

In June 1940, the IND's operator, the New York City Board of Transportation, took over the transportation assets of the IRT and BMT. In June 1953, the New York City Transit Authority, a state agency incorporated for the benefit of the city, now known to the public as MTA New York City Transit, succeeded the Board of Transportation. A combination of factors had this takeover coincide with the end of the major rapid transit building eras in New York City. The city immediately began to eliminate what it considered redundancy in the system, closing several elevated lines including the IRT Ninth Avenue Line and most of the IRT Second Avenue Line in Manhattan, and the BMT Fifth and Third Avenue Lines and most of the BMT Fulton Street Line in Brooklyn.

=== Division differences ===
Despite the unification, a distinction between the three systems survives in the service labels: IRT lines (now referred to as A Division) have numbers and BMT/IND (now collectively B Division) lines use letters. There is also a physical and less widely noticed difference, as A Division cars are narrower than those of B Division by 18 inches (46 cm) and shorter by 9 feet (2.7 m) to 24 feet (7.3 m). Because the A Division lines are of lower capacity for a given capital investment, all new extensions and lines built between World War II and 2007 have been for the B Division. A Division cars can travel on B Division lines when necessary but are not used for passenger service on those lines because of the dangerously wide gap between the car and the station platform. This stems from the IRT and BRT's long-standing disagreement where the BRT intentionally built cars that were too wide for the IRT.

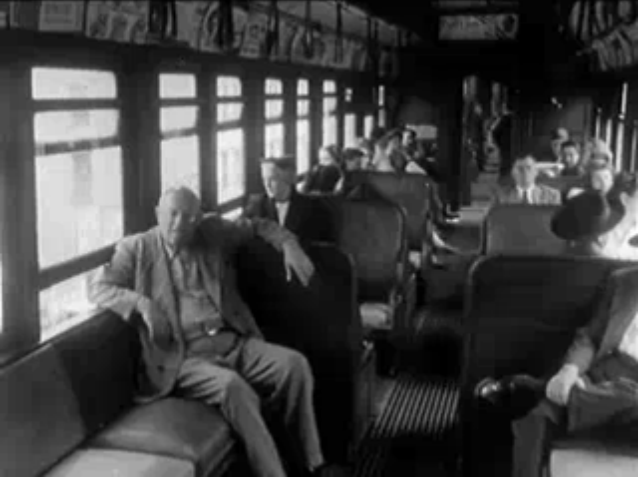
The interior of an IRT Third Avenue Line car before the line's demolition in the 1950s.

The original IRT subway lines (those built before the Dual Contracts) were built to modified elevated line dimensions. Whereas the IRT lines were originally equipped with cars that were 47 feet (14 m) long, the cars designed for the IRT subway measure 51.3 feet (15.6 m) long. Both sets of lines did not permit cars wider than 9 feet (2.7 m). The clearances and curves on these lines are too narrow and too sharp for any IND or BMT equipment. The later extensions of the IRT, constituting the bulk of the IRT system, were built to wider dimensions, and so are of a profile that could support the use of IND/BMT sized equipment.

B Division equipment could operate on much of A Division if station platforms were trimmed and trackside equipment moved, thus letting A Division service carry more passengers. However, there is virtually no chance of this happening because the older, narrower portions of A Division are centrally situated, such that it would be impossible to put together coherent through services. The most that can be reasonably hoped for is that some branch lines of Division A might be resized and attached to B Division lines. This was done with the BMT Astoria Line in Queens which had formerly been dual-operated with normal IRT trains and special narrow BMT shuttles.

=== Post-unification expansion and reorganization ===
New York hoped that the profits from the remaining formerly privately operated routes would support the expensive and deficit-ridden IND lines and simultaneously be able to repay the systems' debts, without having to increase the original fare of five cents. But during World War II, which gave a reprieve to the closure of most rail transit in the U.S., some closures continued, including the remainder of the IRT Second Avenue Line in Manhattan (1942) and the surviving BMT elevated services over the Brooklyn Bridge (1944). The Second World War also caused renewed inflation, which finally caused a fare increase to ten cents in 1947 and six years later to 15 cents.

Ridership skyrocketed during the late 1940s, and on December 23, 1946, the system-wide record of 8,872,249 fares was set.

Because the consolidation dragged in the first years after unification, some improvements in operational processes were rather slow, and soon the question of organization was raised. The outsourcing of subway operations to the Port Authority of New York and New Jersey was favored at one point. On June 15, 1953, the NYCTA was founded with the aim of ensuring a cost-covering and efficient operation in the subways.

There was a need to overhaul rolling stock and infrastructure of the once-private routes, especially for the IRT, where nearly all of the infrastructure was aged. The oldest cars came there from the time the subway opened in 1904, and the oldest subway cars of BMT in 1953 dated from the system's first years, in 1913. Therefore, a total of 2,860 cars for the A Division were delivered between 1948 and 1965, which constituted the replacement of almost the entire prewar IRT fleet. On the B Division, 2,760 cars were ordered. Platforms were doubled in length systemwide. At some stations, gap fillers were installed because the station extensions were curved. Also in this period, the BMT replaced their signals. The Main Line R36 cars were the first equipment to be equipped with two-way radio as delivered standard equipment in 1965, with the first use of radio in the subway system on the IRT Lexington Avenue Line in May 1965. The first successful air conditioned train (R38) was placed into service in July 1967.

In 1946, Mayor William O'Dwyer initiated a program to lengthen station platforms to accommodate ten-car trains. The first contract, which was completed in August 1946, extended the platforms at 125th Street, 207th Street, 215th Street, 225th Street, 231st Street and 238th Street on the IRT Broadway–Seventh Avenue Line for $423,000. Additional platform extensions were completed on the Broadway–Seventh Avenue Line in October 1946. On this date the platform extensions at 103rd Street, 110th Street, 116th Street, 137th Street, 145th Street, 157th Street, 168th Street, 181st Street, 191st Street and Dyckman Street were completed. This project cost $3.891 million. The platform extensions at the Hoyt Street station on the IRT Eastern Parkway Line opened in November 1946, being completed for $733,200. Stations along the IRT Lexington Avenue Line were next to receive the improvements.

In January 1947, the 23rd Street, 28th Street and 33rd Street platform extensions were completed, costing $4.003 million. Work was subsequently completed at the Bleecker Street and Spring Street stations for $1.97 million. The $1.992 million contract to lengthen the platforms at the Canal Street and Worth Street stations to the south was completed in April 1947. In September 1947, a contract extending the platforms for stations in the Bronx was completed. The first stage of the plan was completed in June 1949, lengthening the platforms at Prospect Avenue, Jackson Avenue, Intervale Avenue, Simpson Street, Freeman Avenue, 174th Street and 177th Street on the IRT White Plains Road Line for $315,000. In September 1949, the Chairman of the Board of Transportation, William Reid, announced that the program to lengthen 32 IRT stations had been completed for $13.327 million. Reid also announced that the Board had created a five-year plan to lengthen all remaining BMT and IRT stations to accommodate ten-car trains.

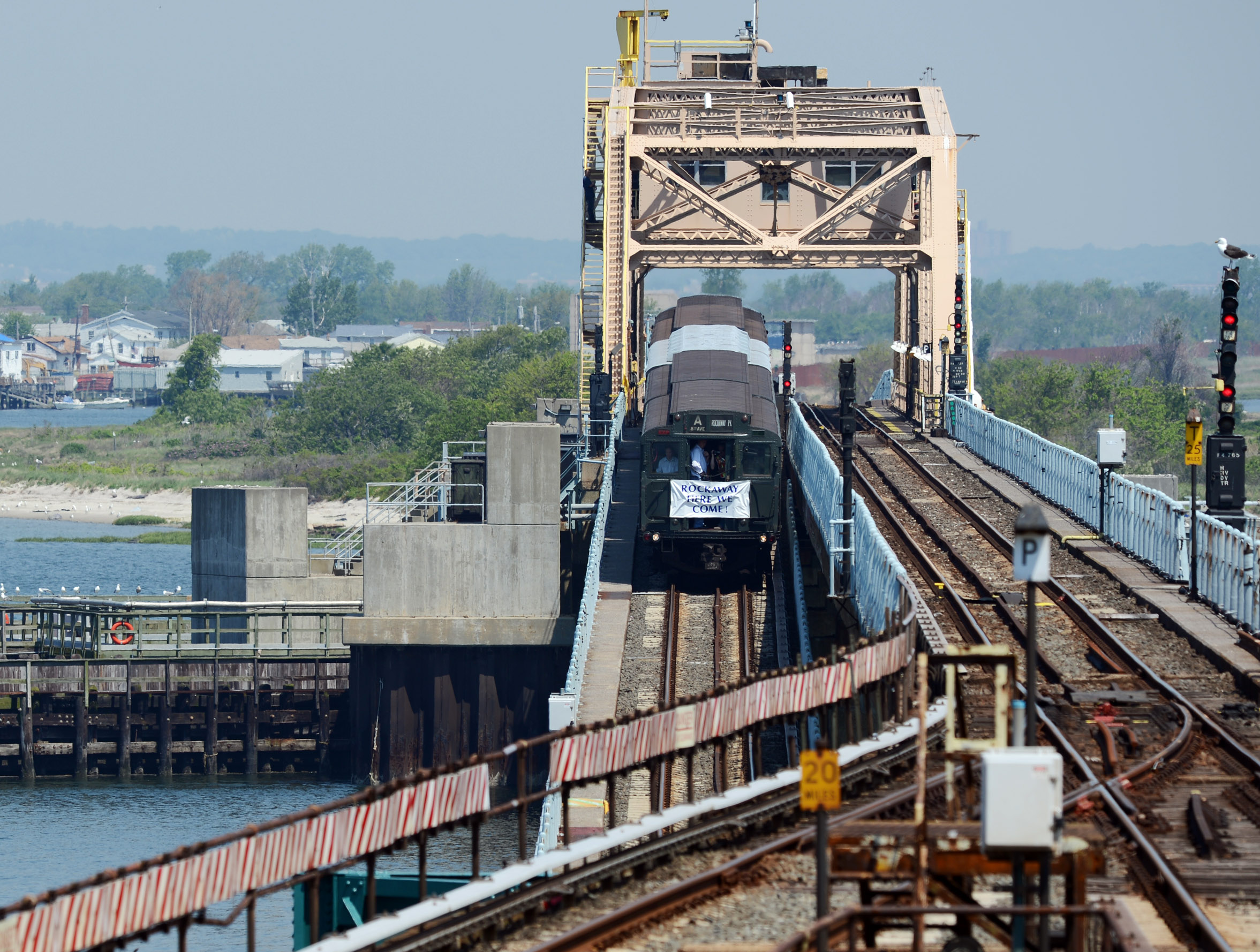
An A train on the IND Rockaway Line, opened in 1956 as one of two major expansions of the system in the mid-20th century

Only two new lines were opened in this era, the IRT Dyre Avenue Line in 1941 and the IND Rockaway Line in 1956, with an extension of the latter to Far Rockaway–Mott Avenue in 1958. Both of these lines were rehabilitations of existing railroad rights-of-way rather than new construction. The former line was the City portion of the New York, Westchester and Boston Railway, an electrified commuter line closed in 1937, and the latter a line obtained from the Long Island Rail Road. While the latter is a long and substantial line, it consists mostly of a long right-of-way crossing Jamaica Bay with a single station on Broad Channel island and two branches on a peninsula that is only several city blocks wide. For a time, the IND Rockaway Line was considered its own subway division.

The 169th Street station on the IND Queens Boulevard Line provided an unsatisfactory terminal setup for a four track line, and this required the turning of F trains at Parsons Boulevard, and no storage facilities were provided at the station. Therefore, the line was going to be extended to 184th Place with a station at 179th Street with two island platforms, sufficient entrances and exits, and storage for four 10-car trains. The facilities would allow for the operation of express and local service to the station. Construction on the extension started in 1946 with planned completion in 1949. The extension was completed later than expected and opened on December 11, 1950. This extension was delayed due to the Great Depression and World War II. Both E and F trains were extended to the new station.

== Decline ==
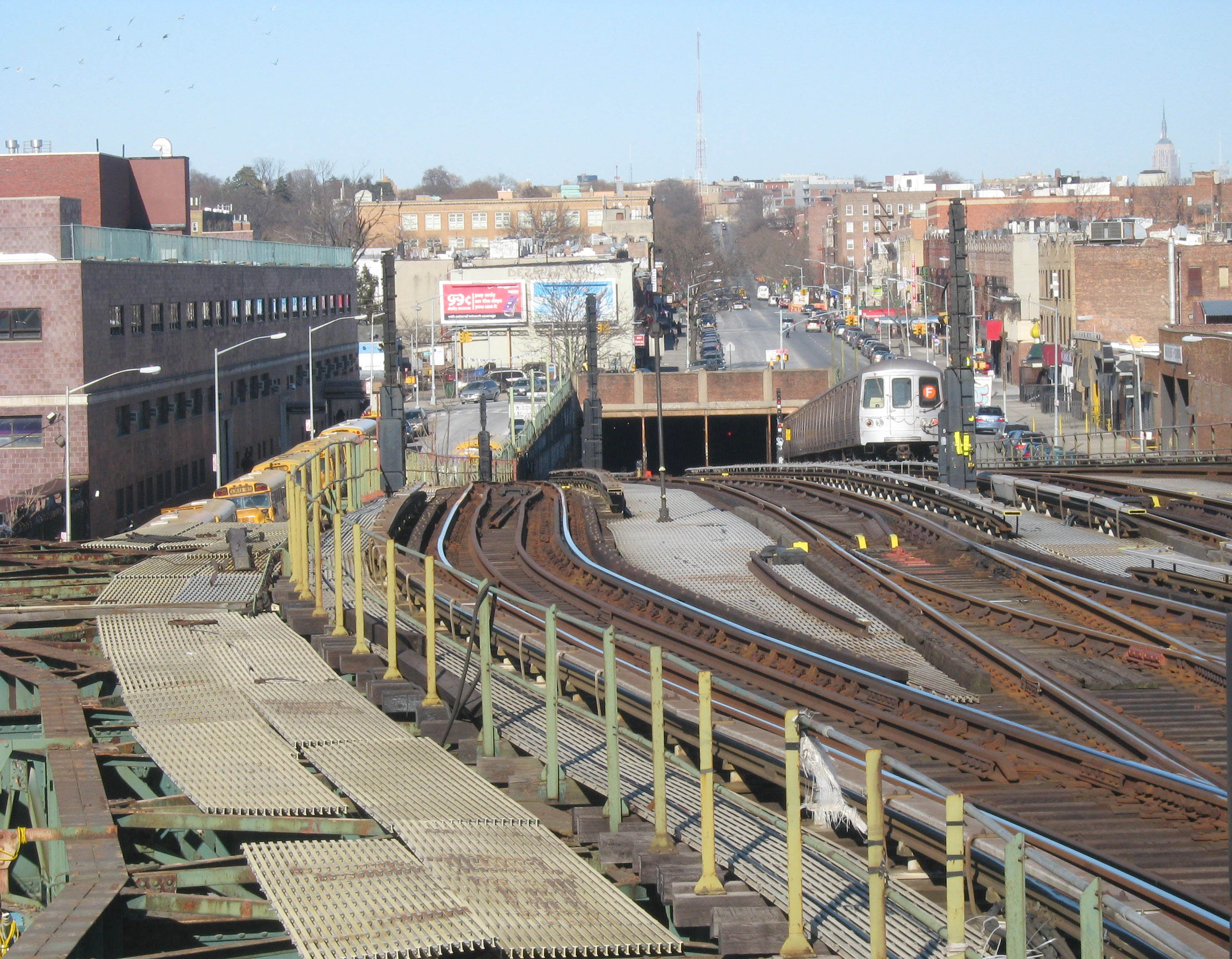
The Culver Ramp was completed in 1954

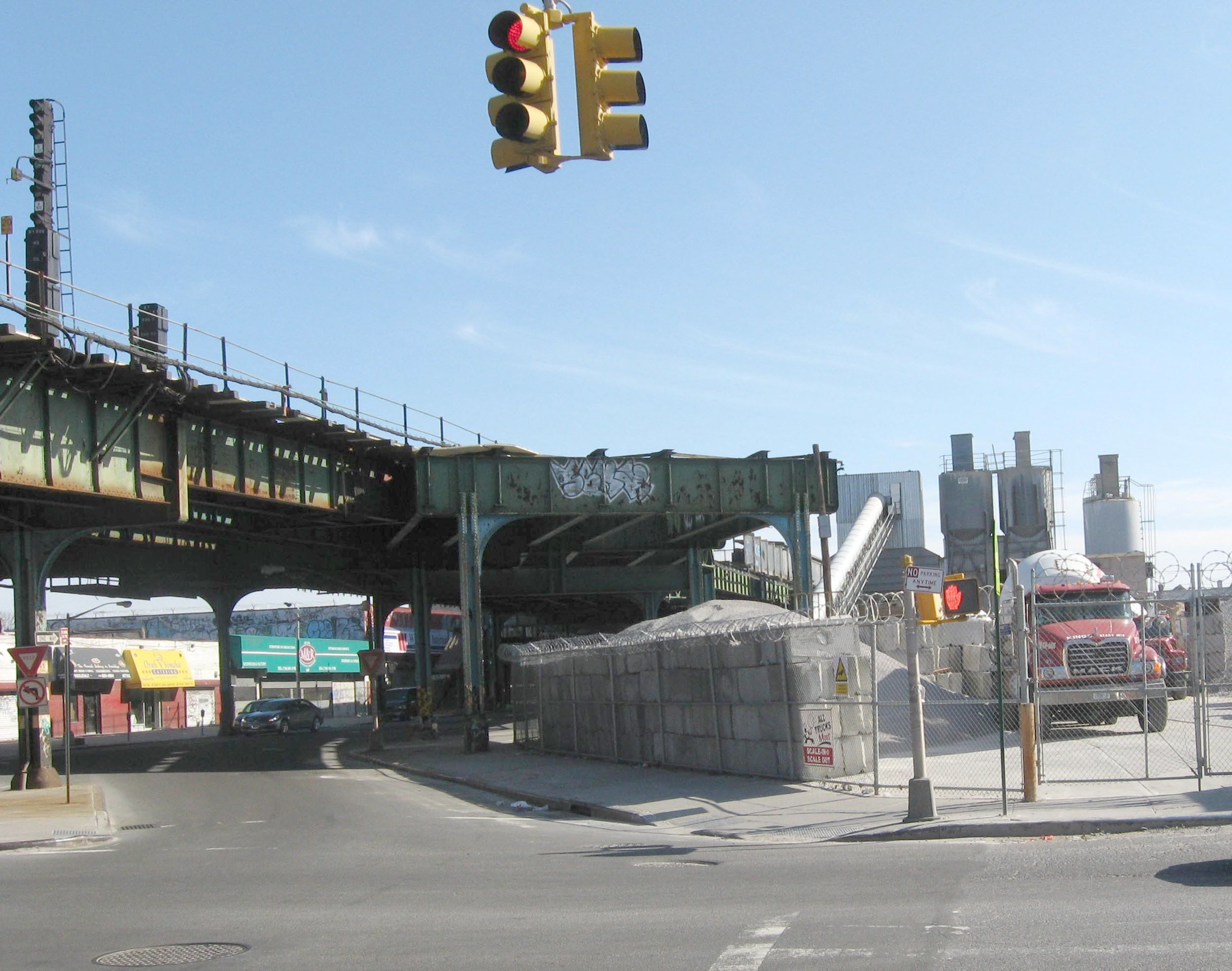
Soon after the Culver Ramp was completed, parts of the ex-BMT Culver Line were demolished. This is a stub to the former line

The originally planned IND system was built to the completion of its original plans after World War II ended, but the system then entered an era of deferred maintenance in which infrastructure was allowed to deteriorate. In 1951 a half-billion dollar bond issue was passed to build the Second Avenue Subway, but money from this issue was used for other priorities and the building of short connector lines, namely a ramp extending the IND Culver Line over the ex-BMT Culver Line at Ditmas and McDonald Avenues in Brooklyn (1954), allowing IND subway service to operate to Coney Island for the first time, the 60th Street Tunnel Connection (1955), linking the BMT Broadway Line to the IND Queens Boulevard Line, and the Chrystie Street Connection (1967), linking the BMT line via the Manhattan Bridge to the IND Sixth Avenue Line.

By January 1955, the Port Authority of New York and New Jersey and the Triborough Bridge and Tunnel Authority could theoretically raise $1.25 billion effective immediately (equivalent to $1.5023×10^{10} in 2025). In his 1974 book The Power Broker, Robert A. Caro estimated that this amount of money could modernize both the Long Island Rail Road for $700 million and the Hudson & Manhattan Railroad for $500 million, with money left over to build the Second Avenue Subway as well as proposed extensions of subway lines in Queens and Brooklyn. However, Robert Moses, the city's chief urban planner at the time, did not allow funding for most mass transit expansions in the New York City area, instead building highways and parkways without any provisions for mass transit lines in the future. Caro noted that the lack of attention to mass transit expansions and routine maintenance contributed to the decline of the subway: "When Robert Moses came to power in New York in 1934, the city's mass transportation system was probably the best in the world. When he left power in 1968 it was quite possibly the worst."

Soon after, the city entered a fiscal crisis. Closures of elevated lines continued. These closures included the entire IRT Third Avenue Line in Manhattan (1955) and the Bronx (1973), as well as the BMT Lexington Avenue Line (1950), much of the remainder of the BMT Fulton Street Line (1956), the downtown Brooklyn part of the BMT Myrtle Avenue Line (1969), and the BMT Culver Shuttle (1975), all in Brooklyn, and the BMT Jamaica Line in Queens starting in 1977. The BMT Archer Avenue Line was supposed to replace the BMT Jamaica Line's eastern end, but it was never completed to its full extent, and opened in 1988 as a stub-end line, terminating at Jamaica Center.

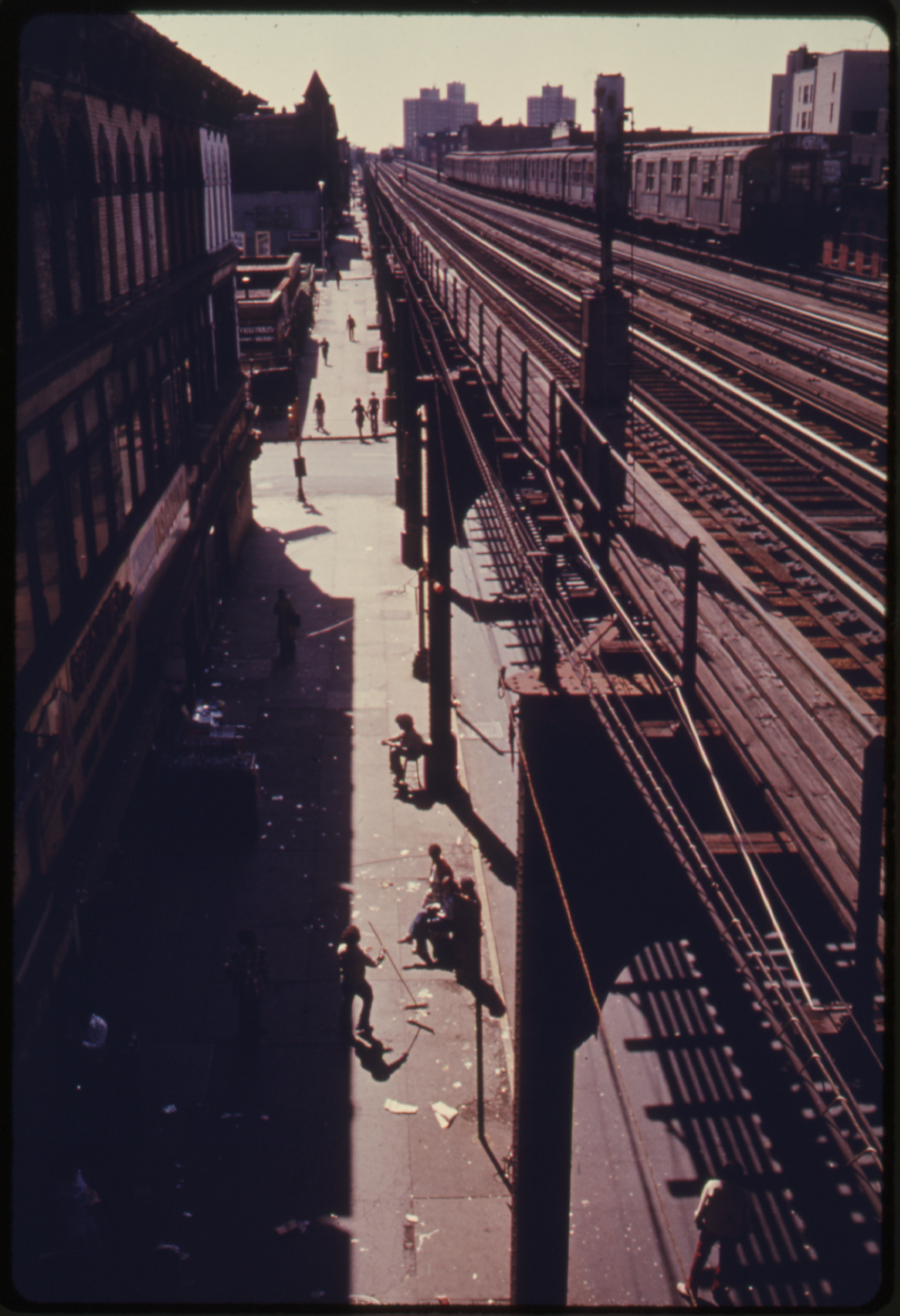
Much of the BMT Myrtle Avenue Line in Brooklyn was demolished. Pictured is the remaining portion in 1974

Construction and maintenance of existing lines was deferred, and graffiti and crime were very common. Trains frequently broke down, were poorly maintained, and were often late, while ridership declined by the millions each year. As in all of the city, crime was rampant in the subway in the 1970s. Thefts, assaults, robberies, shootings and killings became more frequent. The rolling stock was very often painted with graffiti or vandalized both inside and outside. As the New York City Police Department was completely overwhelmed, the public reacted with unease, and the subway was deliberately avoided. Around 1980, the reliability of the vehicles was a tenth of their reliability in the 1960s, and 40 percent of the network required speed restrictions. Because there had been no further studies of the subway since 1975, one third of the fleet was out of use during rush hours due to serious technical defects. In addition, signs were fitted incorrectly, and spare parts were missing or were bought in too large quantities, could not be found, or could not be installed due to lack of repairmen.

The New York City Subway tried to keep its budget balanced between spending and revenue, so deferred maintenance became more common, which drew a slow but steady decline of the system and rolling stock. Furthermore, the workers were consolidated into the Transport Workers Union in 1968. A pension was set up, and workers were allowed to retire after 20 years of service without any transitional period. About a third of the most highly experienced staff immediately retired, resulting in a large shortage of skilled workers.

Rehabilitation started in the 1980s as part of a $18 billion financing program. Between 1985 and 1991 over 3,000 subway cars were overhauled and fitted with air conditioning to increase comfort, reliability and durability while deferring car purchases. The TA only replaced the oldest cars in each division, so it bought only 1,350 new vehicles. Increased patrols and fences around the train yards offered better protection against graffiti and vandalism. At the same time, the TA began an extensive renovation of the routes. Within ten years the tracks were thereby renewed almost systemwide. The Williamsburg Bridge and the Manhattan Bridge, which had strong corrosion damage, were refurbished over the years.

The renovation of the stations was initially limited to security measures, fresh paint, new lighting and signs, but the TA also tried to improve the service that had been neglected. This ranged from new uniforms and training for the staff to correct destination signs on the rolling stock. Some subway services were also adapted to the changing needs of customers. Another stated goal was to reduce crime or at least an improvement in the subjective sense of security. At night, the railway police and members of the citizens' initiative Guardian Angels, formed in 1979, patrolled in the subway trains. In the 1990s, the crime in the city and its subway declined significantly.

=== Late 1950s and early 1960s ===
In 1956, the NYCTA chairman, Charles Patterson, proposed removing the seats from the trains on the 42nd Street Shuttle to increase the passenger load.

On May 1, 1957, a standard maximum interval of 20 minutes between trains was put into place during late nights, with the exception of the Rockaway lines where it was 24 minutes. Some lines had service run as infrequently as 30 minutes. Also on this date, BMT express service was extended to 57th Street from 42nd Street. Earlier in 1957, local service on the BMT Jamaica Line was extended to Crescent Street from Eastern Parkway, and rush hour service was increased to run every 5 minutes.

Under a $100 million rebuilding program, increased and lengthened service was implemented during peak hours on the 1 train. Switching at a junction north of 96th Street, delayed service as trains from the Lenox Avenue Line which ran local switched from the express to the local, while trains from the Broadway Branch that ran express switched from the local to the express. This bottleneck was removed on February 6, 1959. All Broadway trains were locals, and all Lenox Avenue trains were expresses, eliminating the need to switch tracks. All 3 trains began to run express south of 96th Street on that date running to Brooklyn. 1 trains began to run between 242nd Street and South Ferry all times. Trains began to be branded as Hi-Speed Locals, being as fast as the old express service was with 8-car trains consisting of new R21s and R22s on the line.

On November 15, 1962, the express platforms at Lexington Avenue–59th Street opened to reduce transfer congestion at Grand Central–42nd Street, and to allow transfers between the express trains and BMT trains to Queens. Even before the express platforms were added, this station was the busiest on the line. Construction on the express station had begun on August 10, 1959.

=== Program for Action ===
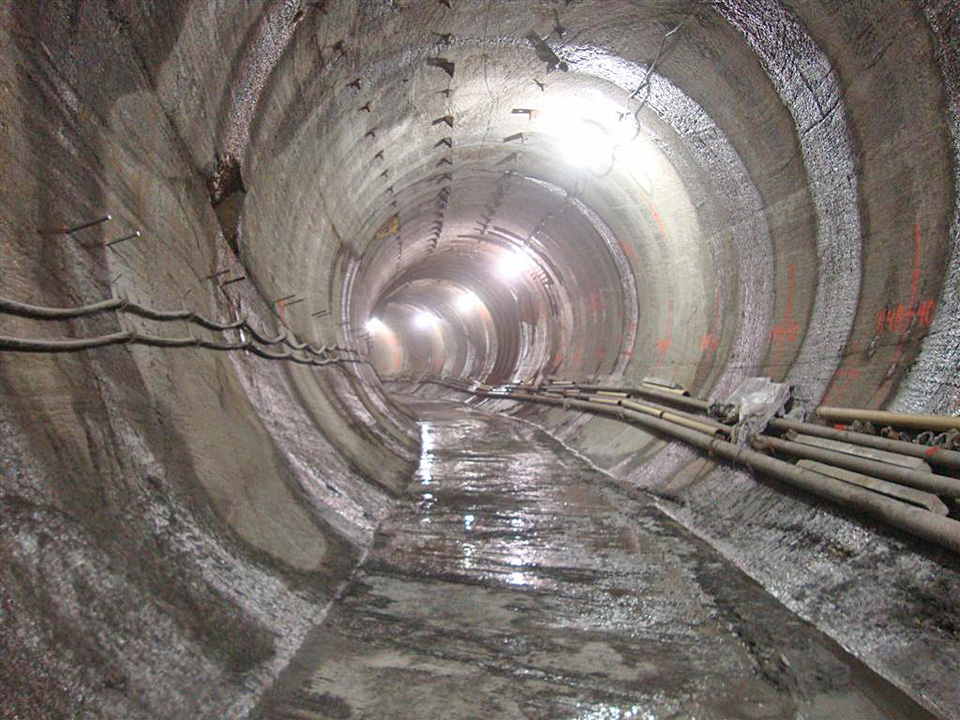
A Second Avenue Subway tunnel

In the mid-1960s, US$600,000,000 was made available to the Metropolitan Transportation Authority (MTA) of New York City for a large subway expansion proposed by then-Mayor John Lindsay. About $1.23 billion was spent to create three tunnels and a half-dozen holes as part of construction on the Second Avenue and 63rd Street Lines. Construction for the lines stopped in 1975 because the city almost went bankrupt, yet none of the lines were done when federal payments were suspended in 1985. The two-phase Program for Action was funded as follows:

- Phase I was to cost $1.6 billion and be completed over the span of a decade.
- Phase II came after Phase I and cost $1.3 billion. Phase II was composed of mostly extensions of existing lines and Phase I-built lines.

The Program for Action also called for supplanting elevated structures with new subways. The eastern end of the BMT Jamaica Line was to be replaced with the BMT Archer Avenue Line, while the IRT Third Avenue Line was to be demolished to make way for a subway route parallel to the Metro-North tracks at Park Avenue.

=== Deferred maintenance ===
Because the early subway systems competed with each other, they tended to cover the same areas of the city, leading to much overlapping service. The amount of service has actually decreased since the 1940s as many elevated railways were torn down, and finding funding for underground replacements has proven difficult. The subway's decline began in the 1960s and continued through the late 1980s.

==== Graffiti ====
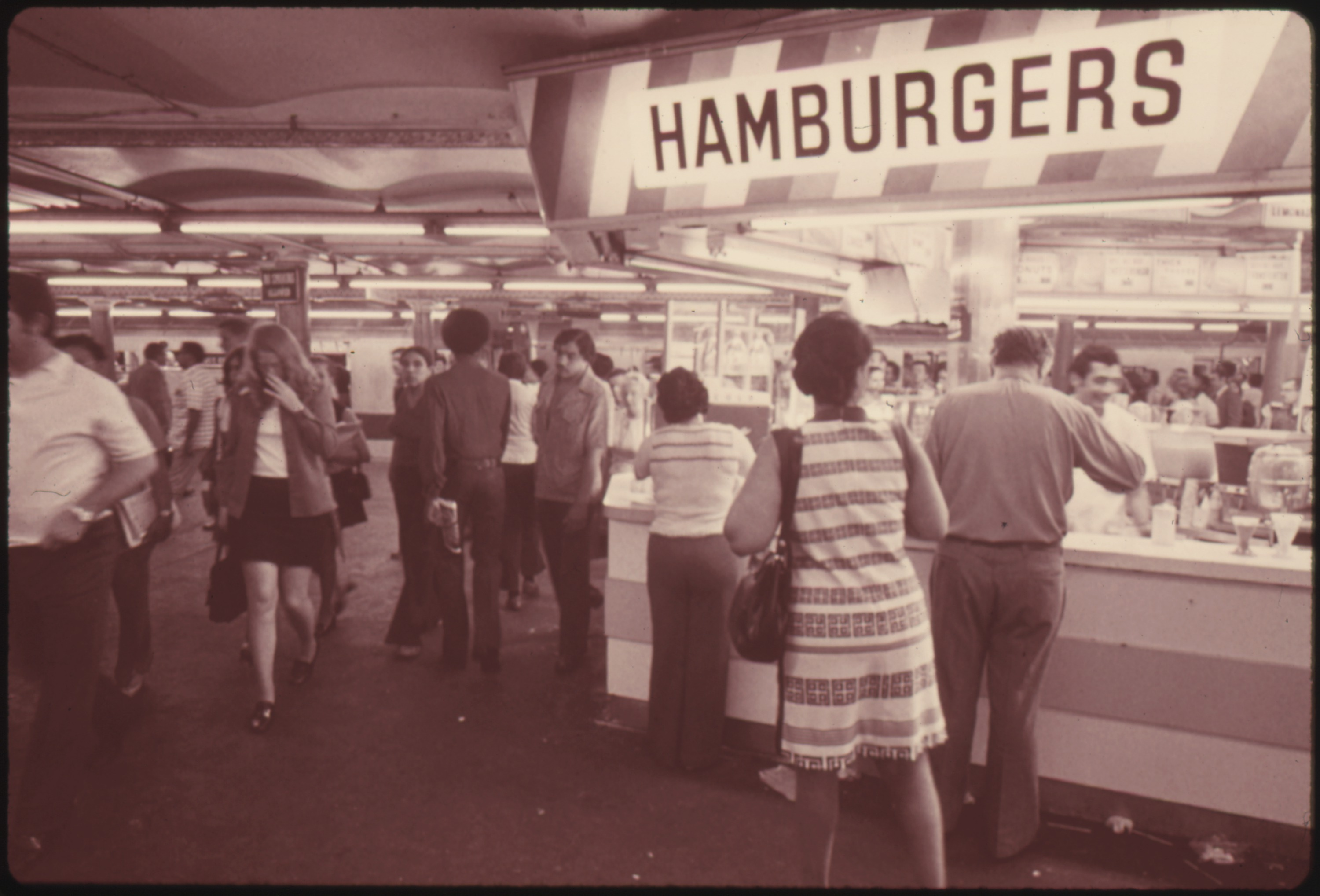
Fast food stands operated in stations until the 1980s

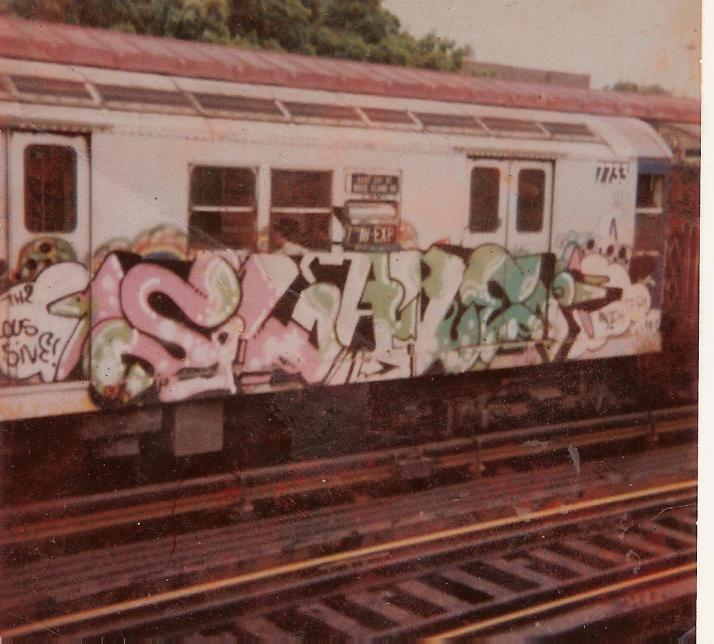
A typical graffiti-tagged car in 1979

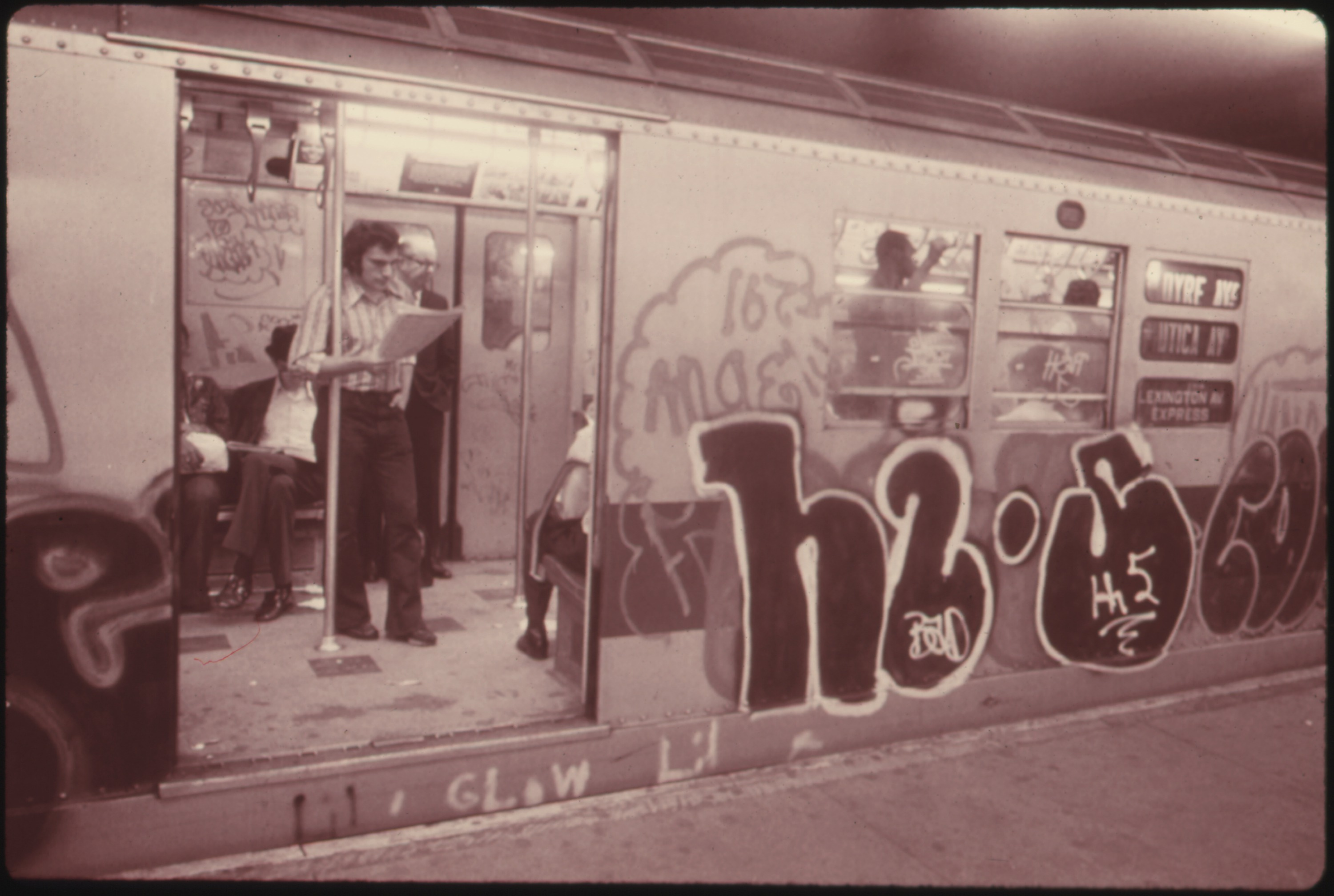
A graffitied car on the IRT Lexington Avenue Line (1973)

In 1973, the city's graffiti epidemic surged so that nearly every subway car was tagged with graffiti. It was worsened by the budgetary restraints on New York City, which limited its ability to remove graffiti and perform transit maintenance. Mayor John Lindsay declared the first war on graffiti in 1972, but it would be a while before the city was able and willing to dedicate enough resources to that problem to start impacting the growing subculture. The MTA tried rubbing the graffiti off with an acid solution, but maintaining the cars to keep them relatively graffiti-free was costing them around $1.3 million annually. In the winter of 1973, the car-washing program was stopped. Attempts to wash cars with an acid solution in September 1974 were detrimental to the fleets' upkeep.

As graffiti became associated with crime, many demanded that the government take a more serious stance toward it, particularly after the popularization of the Fixing Broken Windows philosophy in 1982. By the 1980s, increased police surveillance and implementation of increased security measures (razor wire, guard dogs) combined with continuous efforts to clean it up led to the weakening of the New York's graffiti subculture.

An extensive car-washing program in the late 1980s ensured the elimination of graffiti throughout the system's rolling stock. In 1984 the NYCTA began a five-year program to eradicate graffiti. The years between 1985 and 1989 became known as the "die hard" era. A last shot for the graffiti artists of this time was in the form of subway cars destined for the scrap yard. With the increased security, the previous elaborate "burners" on the outside of cars were now marred with simplistic marker tags which often soaked through the paint. By mid-1986 the NYCTA were winning their "war on graffiti". On May 10, 1989, the rolling stock was made 100% graffiti-free, with the washing of the last train in the subway system that still had graffiti. As the population of artists lowered so did the violence associated with graffiti crews and "bombing".

==== Ridership and service cuts ====
Ridership in 1975 had decreased to 1918 levels, with ridership declining by 25 million or more per year. The MTA reduced the length of trains during off-peak periods, and canceled work on several Program for Action projects, including the Second Avenue Subway and an LIRR line through the 63rd Street Tunnel to a Metropolitan Transportation Center in East Midtown, Manhattan. Ridership kept dropping rapidly, having decreased by 25 million passengers between June 30, 1976, and June 30, 1977; in the previous eight years, 327 million passengers had stopped using the subway. The proportion of the fleet that was in service during the morning peak period was reduced, and train headways were increased: on four local services, trains were reduced from once every four minutes to once every five minutes.

On May 27, 1975, the NYCTA announced that in September of that year 94 daily IRT trips would be discontinued, accounting for 4 percent of then-existing service on the IRT. The trips were to be discontinued to cut operating deficits. Express service on the 7 train was to be discontinued between the hours of 9:30 a.m. and 3:30 p.m. and was to be replaced by more frequent local service. During the same month, the NYCTA was considering making the A train a local at all times except rush hours, when it would remain an express.

On December 17, 1975, the MTA announced that a 4.4 percent cutback of rush hour train service would take place on January 18, 1976. The cutbacks, the third of the year, trimmed 279 train runs from the previous 6,900. Service was most drastically reduced on the Lexington Avenue Line, with seven fewer southbound express trains during the morning rush hours. The cuts were the first of a three-phase program that was put in effect between January and July 1976. The cuts permitted a savings of $12.6 million a year for the NYCTA, which had an increasing deficit. Other subway services were changed or discontinued as part of the plan. On January 19, F trains were planned to stop running express in Brooklyn, and the GG was to be cut back to Smith–Ninth Streets.

In April 1975 it was planned that all rush hour 1 trains would begin running to 242nd Street; these runs had previously terminated at 137th Street. During midday hours, trains on the 1 were to be shortened to five cars. In July, it was planned that the EE would be discontinued; N trains were to have been extended to Continental Avenue via the Queens Boulevard Line to replace it. Manhattan-bound N trains were to continue running express, while in the opposite direction they would run local. N trains would alternate between terminating at Whitehall Street or Coney Island during rush hours. CC trains, in July, were planned to be extended from Hudson Terminal to Rockaway Park replacing the E, which was to have been cut back to Hudson Terminal. The K was planned to be discontinued in July.

The changes that were supposed to take place in July instead took effect on August 30 with 215 more runs eliminated that date. In 1967 there were 8,200 daily trips, and on August 30, 1976, there were 6,337 daily trips.

On December 14, 1976, the NYCTA proposed another package of service cuts. The cuts, planned to take effect in January 1977, would have eliminated service on the Bowling Green–South Ferry Shuttle, the Franklin Avenue Shuttle, and AA service, which would be replaced by the A during late nights. GG service would be truncated to Queens Plaza during late evenings and late nights. B and N service would have been cut back to shuttles, running between 36th Street and Coney Island on their respective lines. It was also proposed that during off-peak hours 10-car trains would be cut to eight, six or four car trains.

In 1986, the NYCTA launched a study to determine whether to close 79 stations on 11 routes, spread across all four of the boroughs that the subway system served, due to low ridership and high repair costs. Numerous figures, including New York City Council member Carol Greitzer, criticized the plans.

==== Infrastructure ====
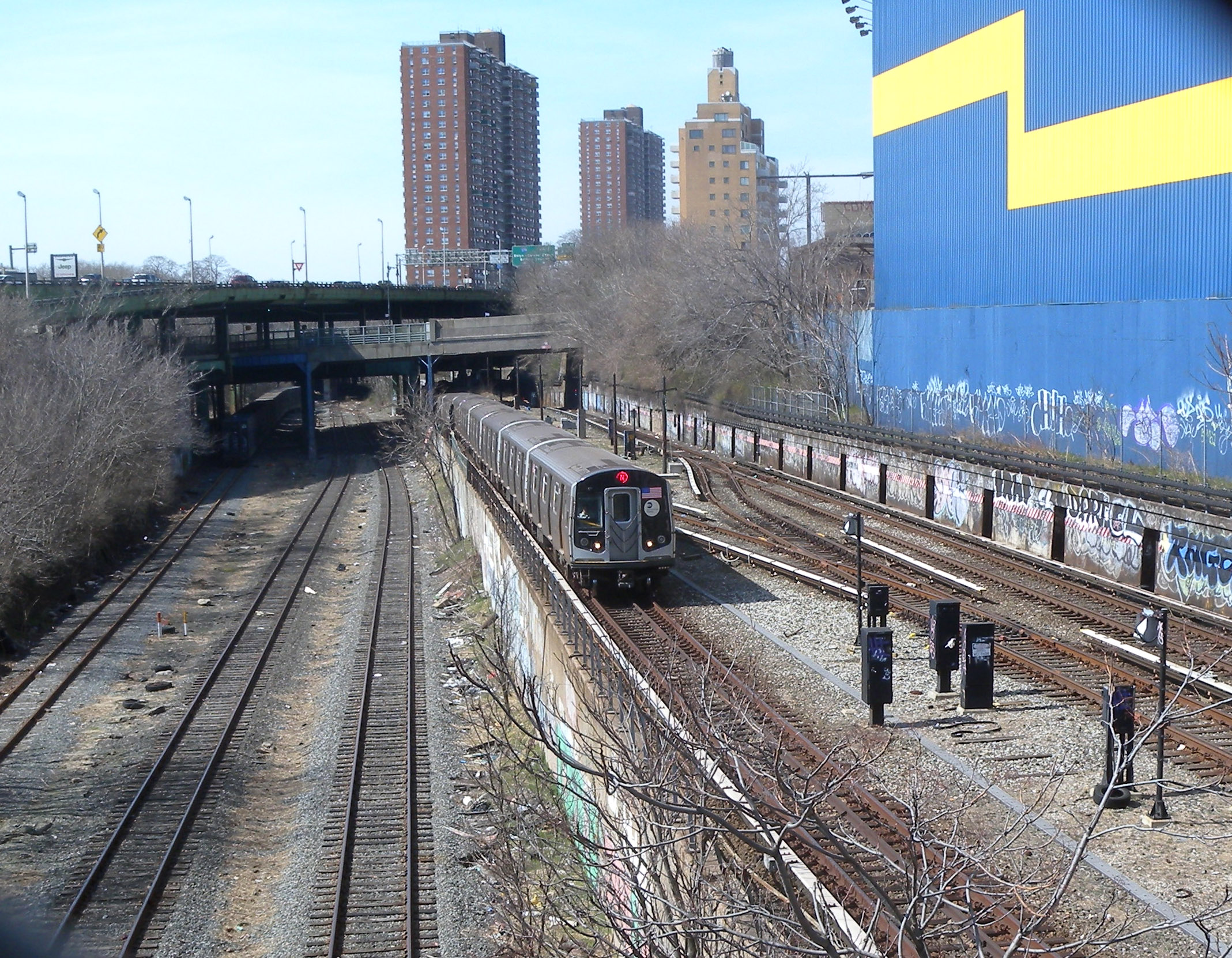
The BMT Sea Beach Line. Note the single express track; the other express track was removed in the 1980s due to deferred maintenance

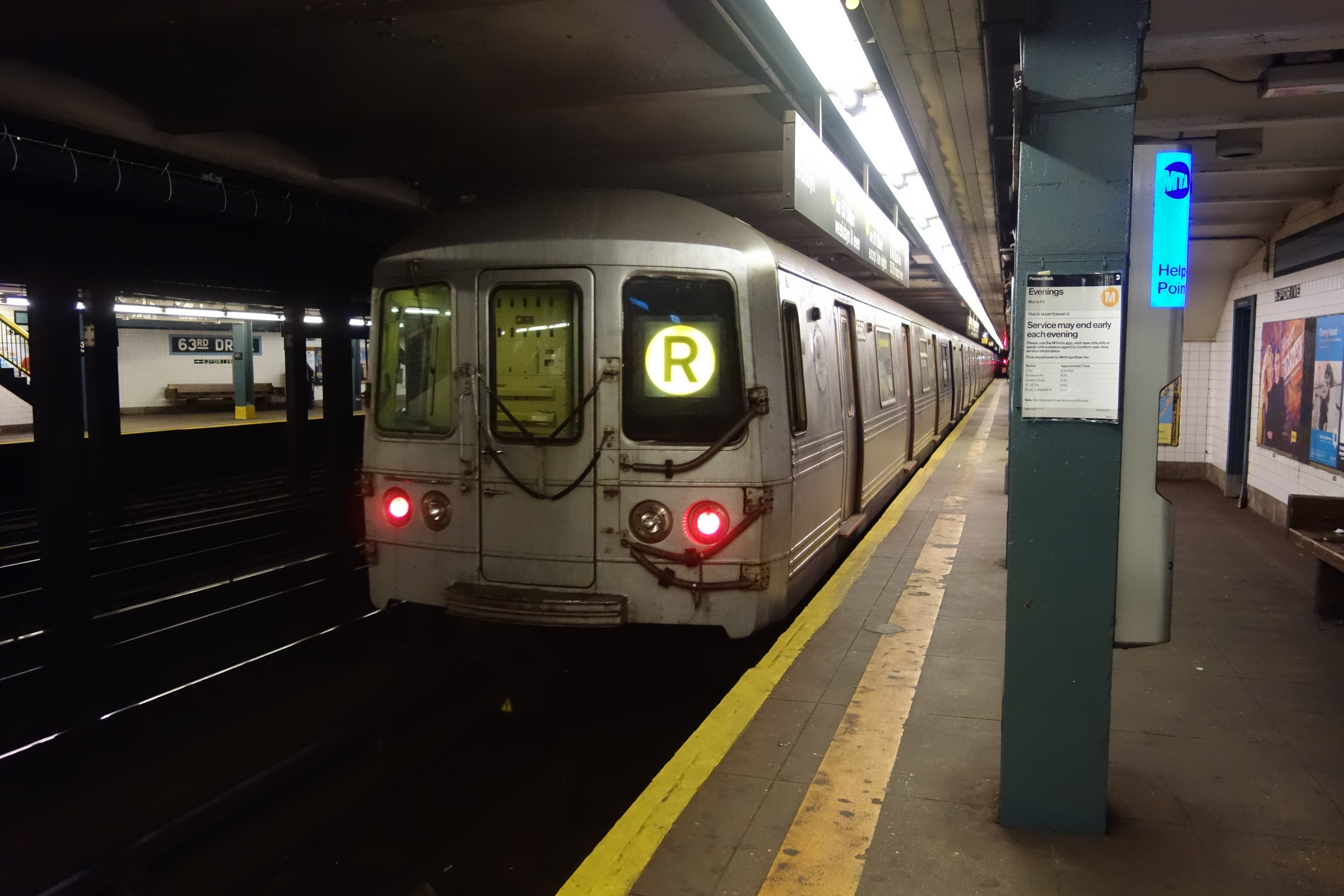
The R46s, the newest cars in the system in 1976, broke down the most due to their cracked trucks

The subway had been gradually neglected since the 1940s, and its situation had been exacerbated by the low fare. On May 20, 1970, two people died at the Jackson Heights–Roosevelt Avenue station in the worst subway collision since the 1928 Times Square derailment. Following the 1970 accident, New York Magazine highlighted the subway system's condition in a lengthy expose. Even though each of the approximately 7,200 subway cars were checked once every six weeks or 7,500 miles (12,100 km) of service, four or five dead motors were allowable in a peak-hour 10-car train, according to some transit workers' accounts. About 85.8% of trains were on schedule in 1970, with 1,142 equipment-related delays in April 1970. However, issues such as broken lights, fans, and signs; defective doors, wheels, and brakes; and subway cars that often became uncoupled or "pulled apart", were still prevalent. One out of three IRT stations did not have running water in case of emergency. In addition, the system's staff were leaving in massive numbers, with 5,655 workers having retired or quit from early 1969 to mid-1970.

The system also had many slow-speed areas because of obstacles that could cause derailments, and every subway car had graffiti; fleet availability during rush hours declined from 5,557 in 1976 to 5,025 in 1977, and to 4,900 in May 1978. Mean Distance Between Failures (MDBF) rates were at all time lows, as the MDBF rate system-wide was 6,000 miles by 1980. In 1979, 200 retired R16 cars were reactivated because the newest rolling stock in the system, the R46, had cracked trucks, and were only allowed to operate during rush hours while they were sent for rehabilitation.

At the height of the transit crisis in 1983, on-time performance dropped below 50%. Hundreds of trains never made it to their destination and in 1981, 325 train runs were abandoned on a typical day. Additionally, cars caught fire 2,500 times every year.

In December 1978 a New York Daily News article highlighted the worst parts of the subway. The Grand Central–42nd Street station was the worst underground station and the Middle Village–Metropolitan Avenue station was the worst elevated station. The subway cars in the worst condition were the R10s. The subway line with the worst signals was the IRT Broadway–Seventh Avenue Line, so the signals were upgraded in the 1980s. The BMT Sea Beach Line had the worst track; its infrastructure had not been upgraded since its opening in 1915. Despite $800 million being allocated by the state in 1978, the TA had spent less than half its 1967 allocation of $600 million. The agency made some infrastructure improvements, though because they were not cosmetic improvements, the public still assumed that the subway had high crime, even during periods of decreased crime.

Due to deferred maintenance, the condition of the subway system reached dangerous conditions in the early 1980s, and the TA considered abandoning the Archer Avenue and 63rd Street projects. Structural defects were found in elevated structures systemwide and on the Manhattan and Williamsburg Bridges, causing frequent closures or delays on many subway lines during the 1980s. Reroutes from both bridges were necessitated; while the Manhattan Bridge, between 1986 and 2004, had two of its four tracks closed at a time for construction, the Williamsburg Bridge needed a shutdown from April to June 1988 for emergency structural repairs to be made. Federal funding for the repair of the BMT Jamaica Line was deferred throughout the 1980s due to the extremely bad state of the Williamsburg Bridge. Pigeon droppings corroded the bridge's steel, there were over 200 broken suspender cables, and concrete in the bridge began to come off and leave large holes.

Due to low ridership and the increasing shabbiness of the subway, parts or most of several lines—the BMT Canarsie Line; the IND Crosstown Line; the IRT Jerome Avenue Line or IND Concourse Line north of 161st Street–Yankee Stadium; and the BMT Jamaica Line east of either Broadway Junction or Cypress Hills—were proposed for closure and abandonment in 1981. Other lines proposed for closure included the remaining part of the IND Culver Line, the BMT West End Line, the IRT Dyre Avenue Line, part of the IND Rockaway Line, part of the IRT White Plains Road Line, and the remaining part of the BMT Myrtle Avenue Line. The BMT Jamaica Line was demolished, mainly as part of the Program for Action, but also due to low ridership. Officials also proposed shutting the subway at night between midnight and 6 a.m. in order to reduce crime. Off-peak train trips, as well as trips on the branches outside the city's core, were reduced sharply.

Operations in 1981 had deteriorated so that:

- One day in January saw 1/3 of the fleet out of service, and the first two weeks had 500 canceled trips per day
- A 10-minute trip in 1910 took 40 minutes in 1981.
- The previous year, there had been 30 derailments.
- The A Division's fleet of 2,637 cars had never been renovated, and MDBF rates were a quarter of that in 1970.
- The newest fleet, the R44s and R46s, made up 1/4 of the B Division's fleet of 4,178 cars, and constantly broke down.
- Furthermore, a sample of 50 cars in 1980 showed that half had serious maintenance problems, such as a flammable undercoat of metal film, flattened wheels, burned out lights, and defective/missing emergency switches.

In 1986, the MTA and Regional Plan Association again considered closing 26 miles (42 km) of above-ground lines to follow population shifts. They included the Jerome Avenue, Dyre Avenue, Franklin Avenue, Crosstown, and Rockaway lines, as well as parts of the Myrtle and Jamaica lines. The south end of the Culver Line and the north ends of the IRT Broadway–Seventh Avenue and White Plains Road Lines were also proposed for closure, as was all of the BMT Sea Beach Line. However, unlike the 1981 proposal, this plan called for a net expansion of the subway system, as 37 miles (60 km) of new underground and surface lines would also be built. Numerous figures, including New York City Council member Carol Greitzer, criticized the 1986 plans.

==== Crime ====
In the 1960s, mayor Robert Wagner ordered an increase in the Transit Police force from 1,219 to 3,100 officers. During the hours at which crimes most frequently occurred (between 8:00 p.m. and 4:00 a.m.), the officers went on patrol in all stations and trains. In response, crime rates decreased, as extensively reported by the press. Due to another crime increase in the subway, the rear cars of subway consists were shut at night beginning in July 1974.

However, during the subway's main era of decline following the city's 1976 fiscal crisis, there were daily reports of crime. Two hundred were arrested for possible subway crimes in the first two weeks of December 1977 under an operation dubbed "Subway Sweep". Violence on the subway increased drastically in the last week of 1978, and six murders occurred in the first two months of 1979, compared to nine during the entire previous year. The IRT Lexington Avenue Line was known to frequent muggers, so in February 1979, Curtis Sliwa's Guardian Angels group began patrolling the 4 train during the night. By February 1980, there were 220 Guardian Angels across the system.

To attract passengers, in September 1978 the TA introduced the "Train to the Plane", a premium-fare service that provided limited stops along Sixth Avenue in Manhattan from 57th Street to Howard Beach, where passengers could transfer to a shuttle bus to JFK Airport. The service was staffed by a transit police officer, and the additional fare was paid on board. This was discontinued in 1990 due to low ridership and the high cost of its operation.

The increase of crime in the subway led to the firing of Transit Police Chief Sanford Garelik. There were about 250 felonies (equivalent to 13,000 per year) occurring in the system every week by September 1979, leading to the deprioritization of quality of life crimes in favor of violent crimes. Additionally, police patrols were too predictable, and MTA and NYPD officers could not easily coordinate with each other. While the daily rate of felonies nearly halved between 1979 and 1980,overall crime increased by 70% in the same period. A series of window-smashing incidents on subway cars started in 1980 on the IRT Pelham Line and spread throughout the rest of the system, causing delays when damaged trains needed to be taken out of service. Over a thousand pieces of damaged windows were replaced between January 27 and February 2, 1985. Other actions included increasing the 60-cent fare to 65 cents to pay the salaries of additional transit police; putting a subway-crimes court in the Times Square station; and stationing a police officer in each car during night hours.

Richard Ravitch, chairman of the MTA, said that even he was scared of going on the subway. Despite the MTA discussing methods to increase ridership, the 1982 figures fell to levels last seen in 1917. Within less than ten years, the MTA had lost around 300 million passengers, mainly because of fears of crime. In July 1985, the Citizens Crime Commission of New York City published a study showing this trend, fearing the frequent robberies and generally bad circumstances. As a result, the Fixing Broken Windows policy, which proposed to stop large-profile crimes by prosecuting quality of life crimes, was implemented. Along this line of thinking, the MTA began a five-year program to eradicate graffiti from subway trains in 1984, and hired one of the original theorists of Broken Windows policing, George L. Kelling, as a consultant for the program in 1985.

In the early afternoon of December 22, 1984, Bernhard Goetz shot four young African American men from the Bronx on a New York City Subway train. The incident got nationwide media coverage. That day, the men—Barry Allen, Troy Canty, Darrell Cabey (all 19), and James Ramseur (18)—boarded a downtown 2 train (Broadway – Seventh Avenue Line express) carrying screwdrivers, apparently on a mission to steal money from video arcade machines in Manhattan. When the train arrived at the 14th Street station in Manhattan, 15 to 20 other passengers remained with them in R22 subway car 7657, the seventh car of the ten-car train.

At the 14th Street station, Goetz entered the car through the rearmost door, crossed the aisle, and took a seat on the long bench across from the door. After Canty asked Goetz how he was, Goetz replied affirmatively, at which point the four boys supposedly moved over to the left of Goetz, blocking Goetz off from the other passengers in the car. They then asked Goetz for money. He fired five shots, seriously wounding all four men. Nine days later he surrendered to police and was eventually charged with attempted murder, assault, reckless endangerment, and several firearms offenses. A jury found him not guilty of all charges except for one count of carrying an unlicensed firearm, for which he served eight months of a one-year sentence.

The incident sparked a nationwide debate on race and crime in major cities, the legal limits of self-defense, and the extent to which the citizenry could rely on the police to secure their safety. Although Goetz, dubbed the "Subway Vigilante" by New York City's press, came to symbolize New Yorkers' frustrations with the high crime rates of the 1980s, he was both praised and vilified in the media and public opinion. The incident has also been cited as a contributing factor to the groundswell movement against urban crime and disorder.

In 1989, the Metropolitan Transportation Authority asked the transit police (then located within the NYCTA) to focus on minor offenses such as fare evasion. In the early nineties, the NYCTA adopted similar policing methods for Penn Station and Grand Central Terminal. In 1993, crime rates in the subway dropped, part of a larger decrease across the city.

On April 2, 1995, the New York City Police Department and the Transit Police Department merged.

==== Effects of the Program for Action ====
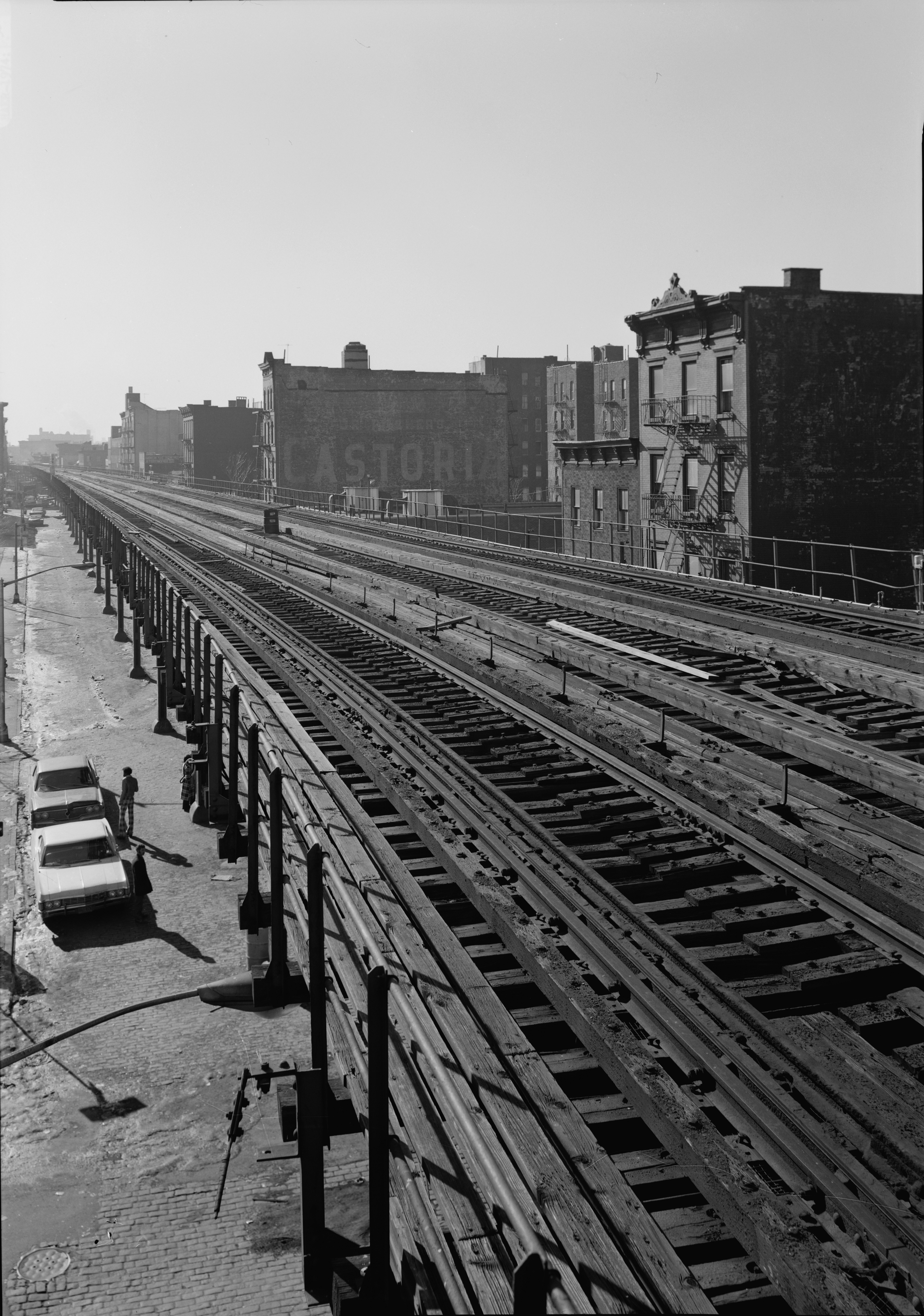
The IRT Third Avenue Line in the Bronx was a casualty of the Program for Action

The Program for Action forced the closure of several subway lines. The Bronx remnant of the IRT Third Avenue Line closed in 1973, to be provisionally replaced by a new subway under the Metro-North Railroad tracks on Park Avenue, one block to the west. The single-tracked Culver Shuttle between Ditmas Avenue and Ninth Avenue, once a three-tracked line, closed on May 11, 1975. On August 27, 1976, the GG service was truncated from Church Avenue to Smith–Ninth Streets, while service was discontinued on the K and EE routes. On December 15, 1976, GG service at the other terminal was shortened to Queens Plaza. The BMT Jamaica Line was truncated from 168th Street to 121st Street between September 11, 1977, and the early 1980s, replaced by the BMT Archer Avenue Line in 1988.

==== Debris falling from and on the tracks ====
Existing elevated structures posed a large danger; the New York Post published a story that featured debris that had fallen from the BMT Astoria Line. Debris from the IRT Pelham Line nearly killed a passerby, and debris from the BMT West End Line led to a lawsuit against the MTA. Concrete falling on the BMT Brighton Line near the Beverley Road station caused a months-long service disruption between November 1976 and February 1977.

==== Fare evasion ====
Fare evasion seemed a small problem compared to the graffiti and crime; however, fare evasion was causing the NYCTA to lose revenue. NYCTA's strategy for restoring riders' confidence took a two-pronged approach. In 1981, MTA's first capital program started system's physical restoration to a State-of-Good-Repair. Improving TA's image in riders' minds is as important as overcoming deferred maintenance. Prompt removal of graffiti and prevention of blatant fare evasion would become central pillars of the strategy to assure customers that the subway is "fast, clean, and safe":

Similarly, fare evasion was taken seriously. The NYCTA began formally measuring evasion in November 1988. When TA's Fare Abuse Task Force (FATF) was convened in January 1989, evasion was 3.9%. After a 15-cent fare increase to $1.15 in August 1990, a record 231,937 people per day, or 6.9%, didn't pay. The pandemonium continued through 1991. To combat the mounting problem, FATF designated 305 "target stations" with most evaders for intensive enforcement and monitoring. Teams of uniformed and undercover police officers randomly conducted "mini-sweeps", swarming and arresting groups of evaders. Special "mobile booking centers" in converted city buses allowed fast-track offender processing. Fare abuse agents covered turnstiles in shifts and issued citations. Plainclothes surveyors collected data for five hours per week at target locations, predominantly during morning peak hours. In 1992, evasion began to show a steady and remarkable decline, dropping to about 2.7% in 1994.

The dramatic decrease in evasion during this period coincided with a reinvigorated Transit Police, a 25% expansion of City police, and a general drop in crime in U.S. cities. In the city, crime rate decline begun in 1991 under Mayor David Dinkins and continued through next two decades under Mayors Rudolph Giuliani and Michael Bloomberg. Some observers credited the "broken windows" approach of law enforcement where minor crimes like evasion are routinely prosecuted, and statistical crimefighting tools, whereas others have indicated different reasons for crime reduction. Regardless of causality, evasion checks resulted in many arrests for outstanding warrants or weapons charges, likely contributing somewhat to public safety improvements. Arrests weren't the only way to combat evasions, and by the early 1990s NYCTA was examining methods to improve fare control passenger throughputs, reduce fare collection costs, and maintain control over evasions and general grime. The AFC system was being designed, and evasion-preventing capability was a key consideration.

TA's queuing studies concluded that purchasing tokens from clerks was not efficient. Preventing 'slug' use required sophisticated measures like tokens with metal alloy centers and electronic token verification devices. To provide better access control, the NYCTA experimented with floor-to-ceiling gates and "high wheel" turnstiles. Prototypes installed at 110th Street/Lexington Avenue station during a "target hardening" trial reduced evasions compared to nearby "control" stations. However, controls consisting entirely of "high-wheels" created draconian, prison-like environments, with detrimental effects on station aesthetics. Compromises with more secure low-turnstile designs were difficult, as AFC did not prevent fare evasion.

Production Automated Fare Collection (AFC) implementation began in 1994. New turnstiles, including unstaffed high wheels, and floor-to-ceiling service gates, featured lessons learned from trials. As AFC equipment was rolled out, evasion plummeted. Fare abuse agents, together with independent monitoring, were eliminated.

=== Rehabilitation and rising trend ===
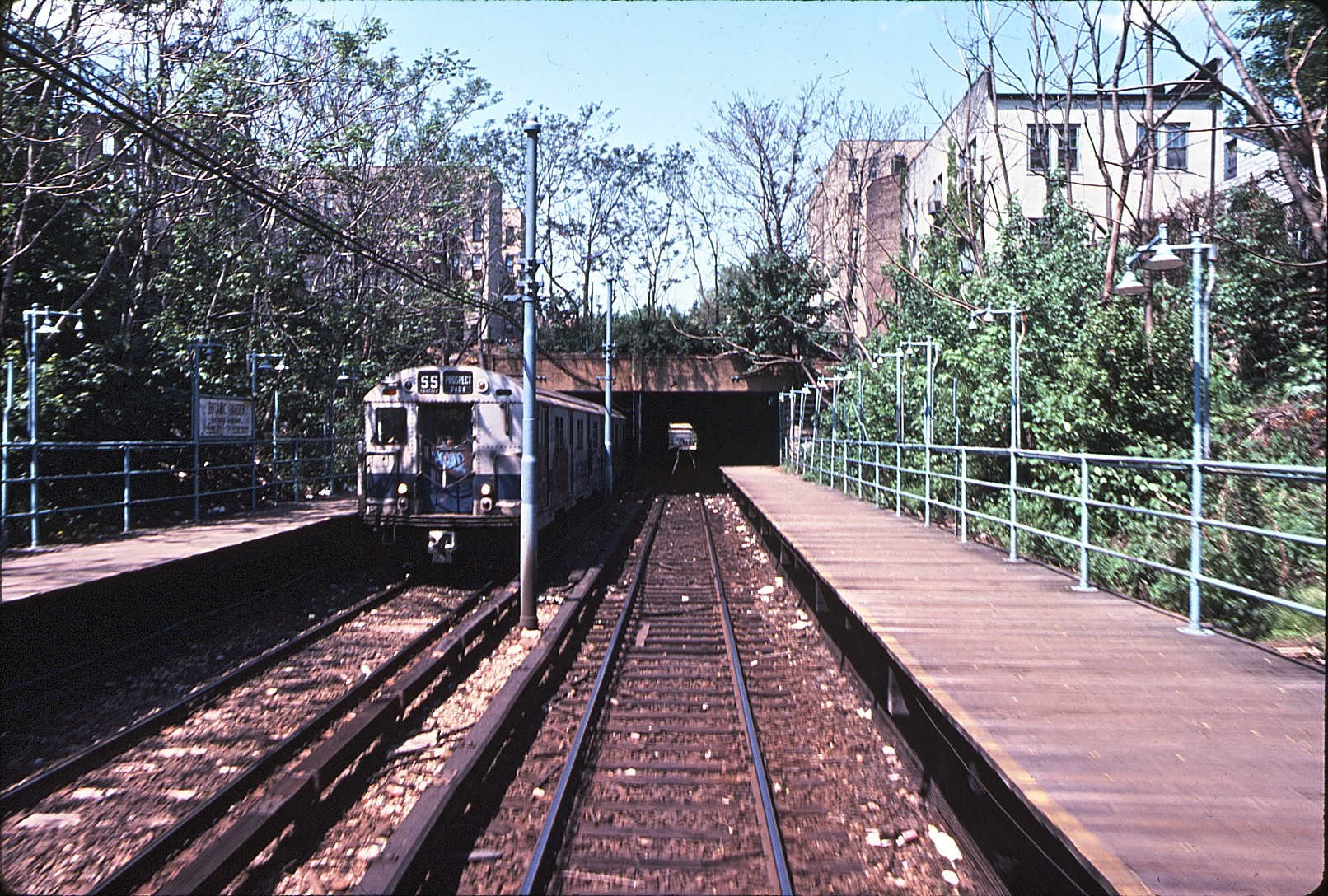
The BMT Franklin Avenue Line (at Botanic Garden) in the 1970s was in a state of rapid degradation

Ridership increased 4% between 1978 and 1979, mainly because of the improving economy. Numerous improvements were touted in a 1979 Daily News report, including air conditioning and closed-circuit television. As part of the Urban Mass Transit Act, $1.7 billion would be provided by the state and the Port Authority. Aesthetics chairperson Phyllis Cerf Wagner announced a program called "Operation Facelift", which entailed aesthetic improvements such as repainting and relighting the platforms, quicker replacement processes for windows and doors, and expanding the number of seats on platforms.

During the mid-1980s, reconstruction began. Stations were refurbished and rolling stock was repaired and replaced. "Neighborhood maps" for wayfinding were added in subway stations starting in 1985. Maintenance of the subway began to improve: while 21 trains derailed while in passenger service during 1983, there were 15 such incidents in 1984 and three in 1985. "Red tag" areas, where trains reduced speed to 10 mph due to dangerous maintenance conditions, were almost entirely eliminated by 1986. The 325 R62 cars had a MDBF rate of 50,000 miles, more than five times higher than the other fleet, with the newly overhauled World's Fair R36 equipment on the Flushing Line averaging over 30,000 miles in 1986–87. The MDBF of many rolling stock increased from 6,000 miles in 1980 to 10,000 miles in September 1986, and hundreds cars were overhauled or cleaned of graffiti. Speedometers were also installed on existing and new rolling stock.

On January 1, 1982, the MTA implemented the first of its five-year Capital Improvement programs to repair the existing system. Scheduled Maintenance Services were formed to proactively replace components, and the MTA conducted general overhauls of the R26 through R46 fleets. Older equipment (any car classes with contract numbers below R32s on the B Division and R26s on the A Division) were retrofitted with air conditioning. The red tag areas were incrementally repaired and replaced with welded rail. At the end of the century, the MDBF rates for the entire system were at record highs and steadily increasing. The Franklin Avenue Shuttle, however, was worse in 1989 than it was in 1980, and necessitated a complete renovation by 1998, because the MTA planned to abandon the line by the end of the century.

=== Projects during this time ===
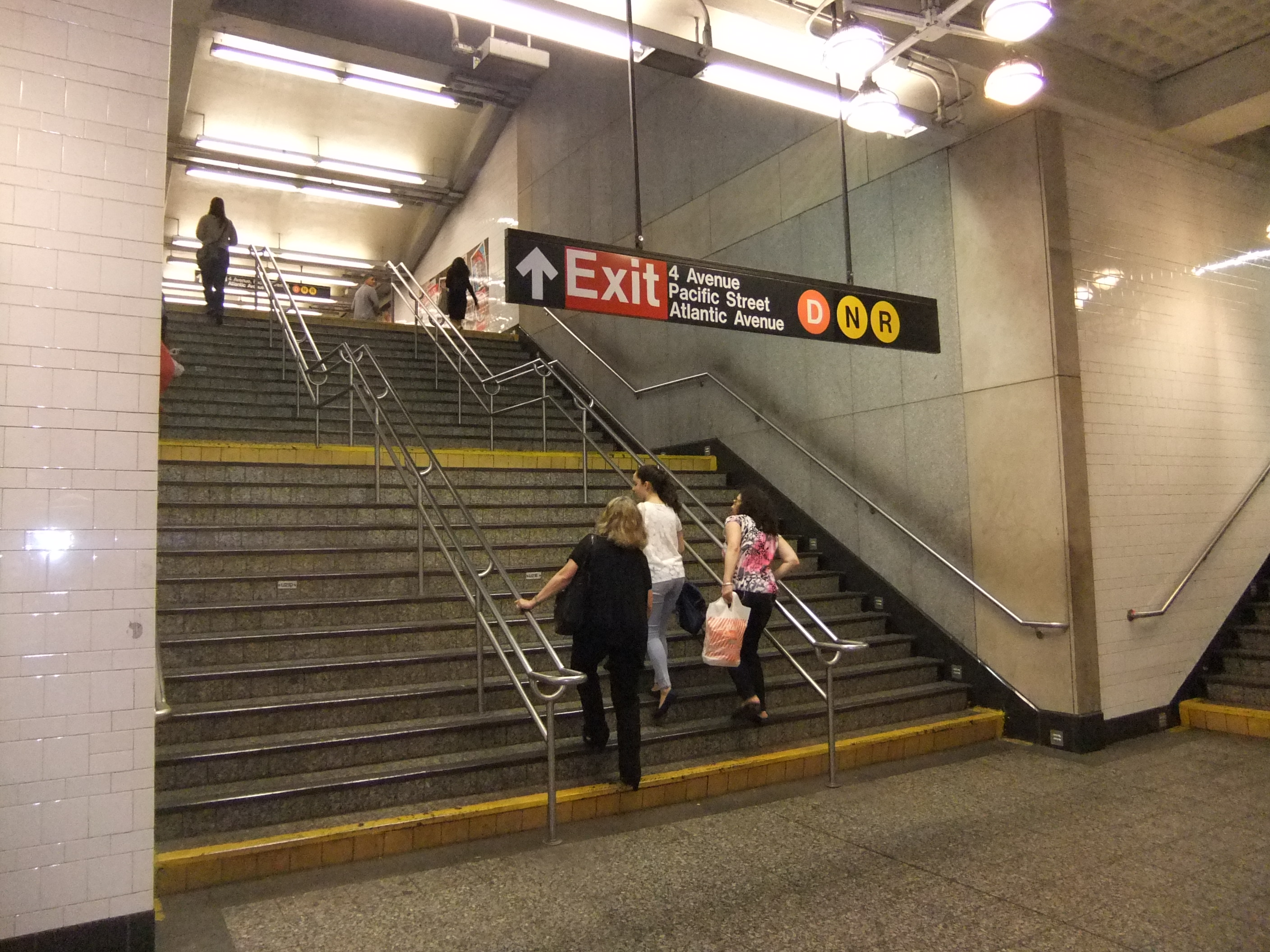
Atlantic Avenue – Barclays Center transfer

Starting in the early 1970s, there were plans for improving the subway system. In 1976, the MTA proposed abandoning the Franklin Avenue Shuttle to save money, but dropped the plan due to community pushback. The possibility of the discontinuation was revisited again in 1998, but again, fierce community opposition to it forced the MTA to rehabilitate the line.

In 1977, the Linden Shops opened in Brooklyn, enabling the MTA to build track panels indoors throughout the year, among other objects.

On January 16, 1978, the MTA opened three transfer stations:

- Between the 14th Street station on the IRT Broadway–Seventh Avenue Line and the previously-connected stations on the BMT Canarsie Line and IND Sixth Avenue Line
- Between the IRT Lexington Avenue Line at Canal Street and the local platforms of the BMT Broadway Line
- Between the BMT Brighton Line, the BMT Fourth Avenue Line, and the IRT Eastern Parkway Line at Atlantic Avenue–Barclays Center

In April 1981, the following projects were considered by the MTA:

- Switching the northern ends of the N and RR trains
- Adding a T service via the BMT West End Line, running between the Financial District and Bay Parkway
- Extending B trains to 168th Street and eliminating AA service
- Adding a K service via the Chrystie Street Connection from Canarsie to midtown Manhattan
- Adding a non-stop express from 59th Street and the World Trade Center, which was ultimately untenable because of capacity constraints

In 1981, the MTA began installing welded rails on a few underground portions of the system.

In June 1983, the following projects were considered by the MTA:

- The JFK Express would be extended to Rockaway Park–Beach 116th Street, and the $5 fare and the special guard would be eliminated, making it like any other subway line. Trains would be 8 cars long instead of 4 cars long, and the headway between trains would be 18 minutes, instead of 20 minutes.
- During rush hours, the CC would terminate at Euclid Avenue, instead of serving the Rockaways.
- B train service would run all day from Coney Island to 168th Street, instead of terminating at 57th Street during non-peak hours.
- AA service, which operated during non-rush hours, would be eliminated.
- A new shuttle service, named H, would run between 57th Street and World Trade Center.

On March 25, 1986, the Regional Plan Association (RPA) proposed several changes. A major part of the plan was eliminating parts of the system and expanding the system to reflect population shifts. The plan called for eliminating 26 miles of elevated lines and building 17 miles of new subway lines, and 20 miles of new surface lines. The RPA also suggested buying new subway cars; implementing One Person Train Operation outside of rush hours; giving reduced fares to city residents using the Long Island Rail Road or Metro-North Railroad to travel to Midtown Manhattan; adding premium-fee express services; closing 10% of stations; and doubling off-peak services. The RPA also suggested:

- Extending the IND 63rd Street Line to southeast Queens
- Building the Second Avenue Subway
- Restoring the Rockaway Beach Branch
- Building a subway line under Jewel Avenue in Queens, to branch off the IND Queens Boulevard Line
- Building a tunnel under the Hudson River to extend the IRT Flushing Line to New Jersey
- Complete the LIRR tunnel to Midtown
- Provide the East Side Access to Grand Central Terminal via the lower level of the 63rd Street Line at a cost of $1.4 billion (to be completed in the early 2020s)
- Purchase 500 new subway cars at a cost of $500 million.

In April 1986, the New York City Transit Authority began to study the possibility of eliminating sections of 11 subway lines because of low ridership. The segments are primarily located in low-income neighborhoods of the Bronx, Brooklyn and Queens, with a total of 79 stations, and 45 miles of track, for a total of 6.5 percent of the system. The lines were first identified in the first part of a three-year project, the Strategic Plan Initiative, which started in April 1985, by the MTA to evaluate the region's bus, subway, and commuter rail systems. The eleven segments all had low ridership, needed expensive rebuilding, and duplicated service on parallel lines. The lines being studied included the following lines:

- The IRT Broadway–Seventh Avenue Line from 215th Street to 242nd Street, which was duplicated by buses.
- The IRT White Plains Road Line from East 180th Street to 241st Street, which was duplicated by buses.
- The entire IRT Dyre Avenue Line, which was duplicated by buses.
- The IRT Jerome Avenue Line from 167th Street to Woodlawn, which was paralleled by the IND Concourse Line.
- The entire IND Rockaway Line south of Howard Beach, due to low ridership.
- The IND Culver Line south of Avenue U, due to low ridership and duplication by buses.
- The entire IND Crosstown Line, due to low ridership and duplication by buses.
- The BMT Jamaica Line between Crescent Street and 121st Street, due to low ridership and duplication by buses.
- The entire BMT Myrtle Avenue Line, which was duplicated by buses.
- The entire BMT Sea Beach Line, which ran close to the BMT West End Line.
- The entire BMT Franklin Avenue Line, due to major deterioration.

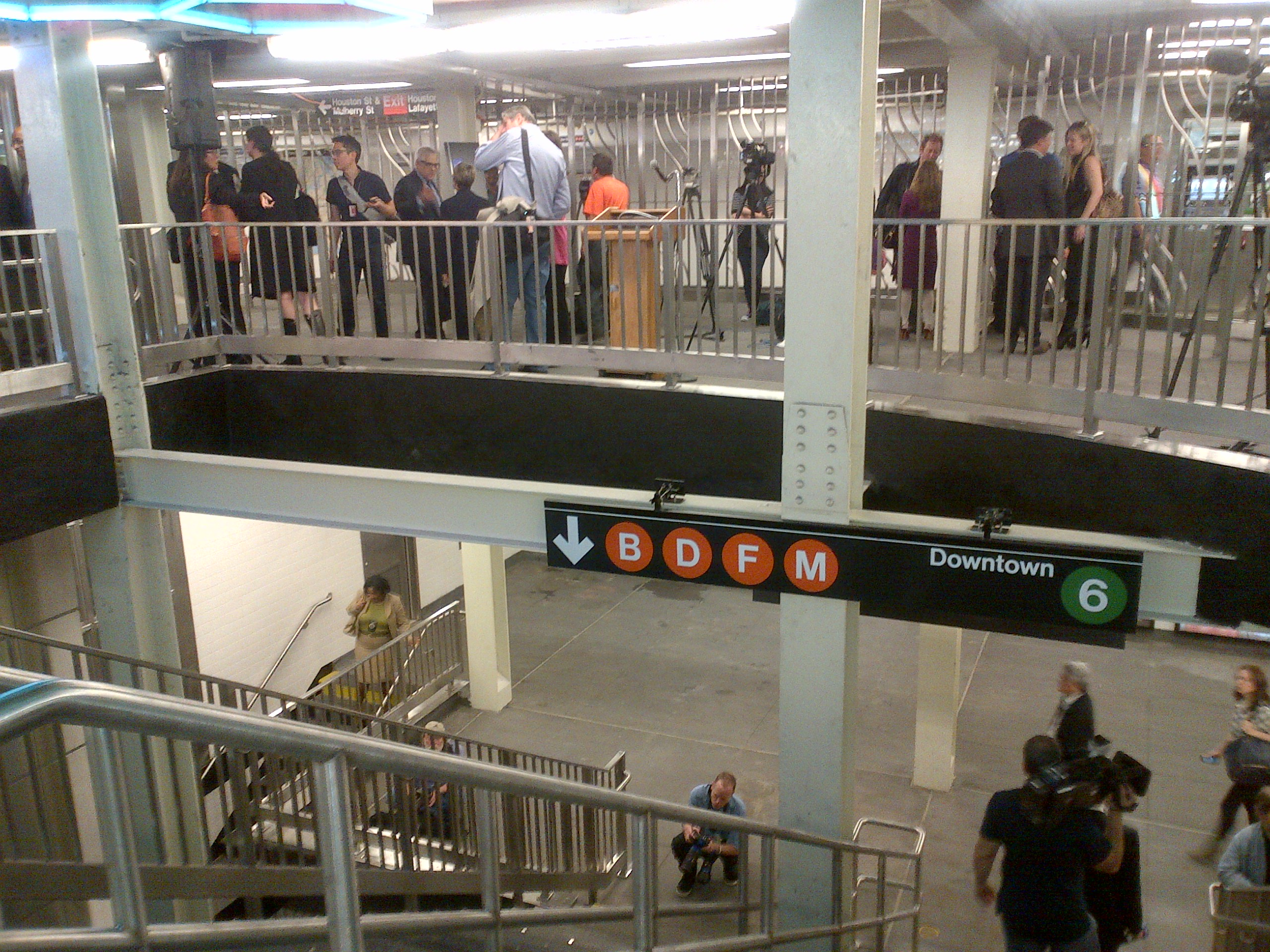
The Broadway – Lafayette Street station to the northbound IRT Lexington Avenue Line at Bleecker Street

By August 1989, the MTA was considering these projects:

- Connecting the IND 63rd Street Line to the IND Queens Boulevard Line
- Adding signals to the Queens Boulevard Line's express tracks so that trains could operate in both directions, and adding 250 subway cars
- Completing the Second Avenue Subway
- A 1.25 miles (2.01 km) connection from Parkside Avenue on the BMT Brighton Line to Seventh Avenue on the IND Culver Line, due to the Manhattan Bridge subway closures
- 700 subway cars for the IRT
- Three storage yards, two in Brooklyn and one in Queens
- Expanding the terminal tracks at Flatbush Avenue–Brooklyn College station
- Building a 10-car platform for South Ferry station (IRT Broadway–Seventh Avenue Line)
- Building transfer stations:
  - The Broadway – Lafayette Street station to the northbound IRT Lexington Avenue Line at Bleecker Street (done in September 2012)
  - A connection between the South Ferry, Bowling Green and Whitehall Street stations (done between South Ferry and Whitehall Street in March 2009)
  - Botanic Garden on the Franklin Avenue Shuttle with the Franklin Avenue station on the IRT Eastern Parkway Line (done in 1999)
  - Closing the Hewes Street and Lorimer Street stations on the BMT Jamaica Line, and building a new intermediate station that connected with Broadway on the IND Crosstown Line.

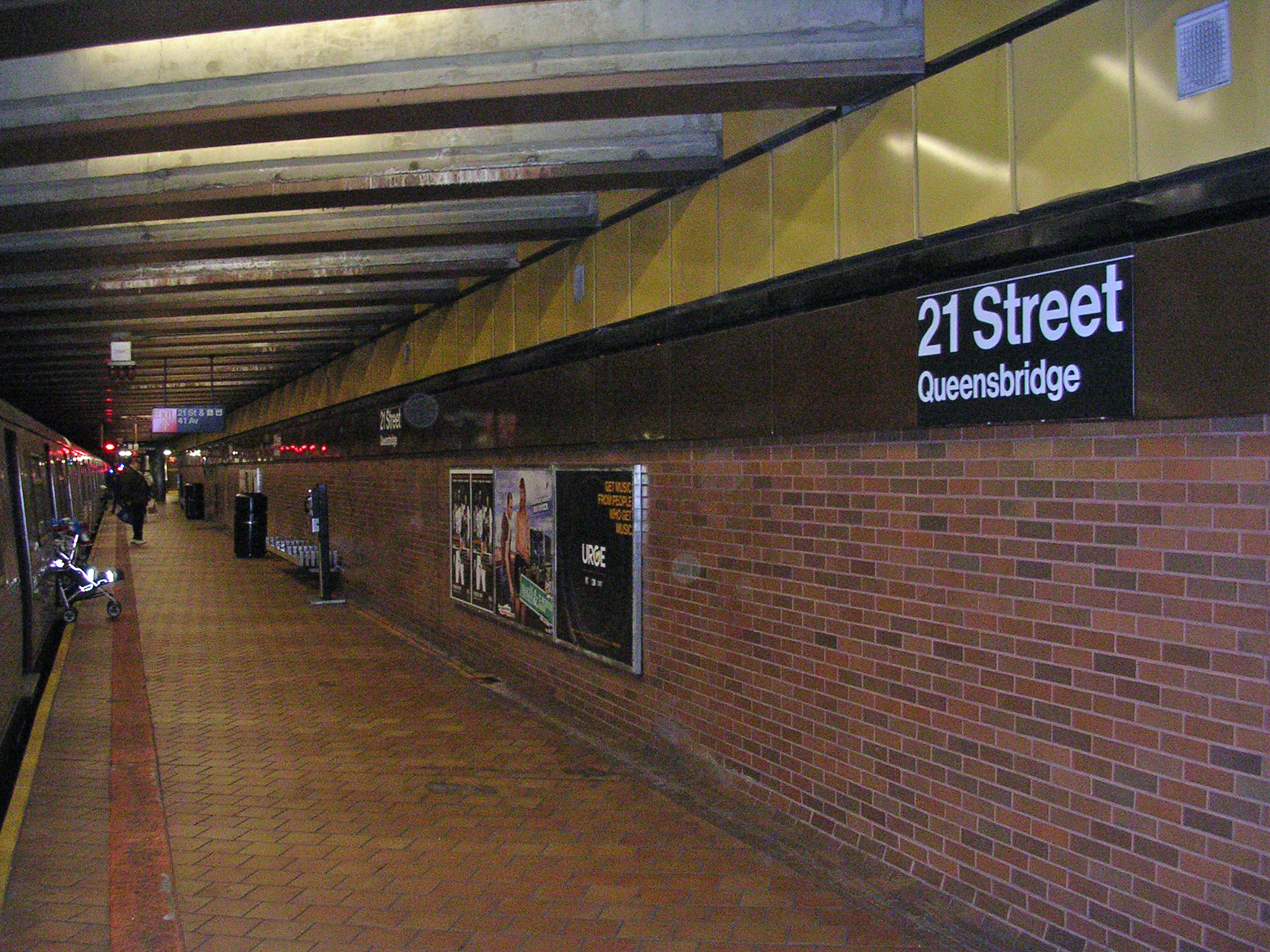
21st Street – Queensbridge, opened in October 1989

In December 1988, three transfers were opened between existing stations, and three brand-new stations were opened. The transfer points were:

- Lexington Avenue / 53rd Street and 51st Street stations
- Long Island City – Court Square and 23rd Street – Ely Avenue stations (now known as Court Square and Court Square – 23rd Street, respectively)
- 42nd Street – Port Authority Bus Terminal and Times Square – 42nd Street stations

The new stations were Sutphin Boulevard – Archer Avenue – JFK Airport, Jamaica Center – Parsons/Archer, and Jamaica – Van Wyck. Other service changes were implemented that day. Skip-stop service on the J/Z trains was also started on December 11, 1988. Additionally, IND Fulton Street Line express service was extended from weekdays only to all times except late nights. Discontinuous services on the B, D, and Q trains over the Manhattan Bridge were replaced by continuous services.

New subway cars were also purchased: the R62 and R62A fleets for the A Division and the R68 and R68A fleets for the B Division. The R62 in particular was the first New York City Subway car class built by a foreign manufacturer. These were all delivered between 1983 and 1989. The R10, R14, R16, R17, R21, and R22 car classes all were retired with the deliveries of the R62/As and R68/As. On May 10, 1989, the last train with graffiti was taken out of service; the subway has been mostly graffiti-free since this point.

On October 29, 1989, the IND 63rd Street Line was opened. It was nicknamed the "tunnel to nowhere" due to its stub end at 21st Street–Queensbridge, and also due to the fact that the three-station extension lay dormant for over a decade after completion. The 3.2 mile line included three new stations and cost a total of $868 million. The line was viewed as an enormous waste of money.

== Revitalization and recent history ==
=== 1990s ===
Subway ridership increased through the 1990s. Throughout David Dinkins's mayoralty from 1989 to 1993, the city went from being in debt to having a $200 million surplus, which was achieved by raising taxes. However, Dinkins's tax plans were unpopular, and he lost the 1993 election to Rudy Giuliani. Giuliani wanted to demonstrate that he could successfully run New York City without raising taxes, so he eliminated $400 million from the MTA's capital budget in 1994. He did not suggest any transit improvements, however. State lawmakers also reduced MTA funding in the 1990s, which remained mostly unchanged through the 2000s.

In 1998, a large portion of the New York City Subway system was nominated for addition to the National Register of Historic Places. The nomination encompassed 48 stations, 11 electrical substations, six signal towers, four station head houses, three buildings in storage yards, and one tunnel. The MTA supported the listing, which would increase the agency's chances of receiving more federal funding.

=== September 11, 2001 ===
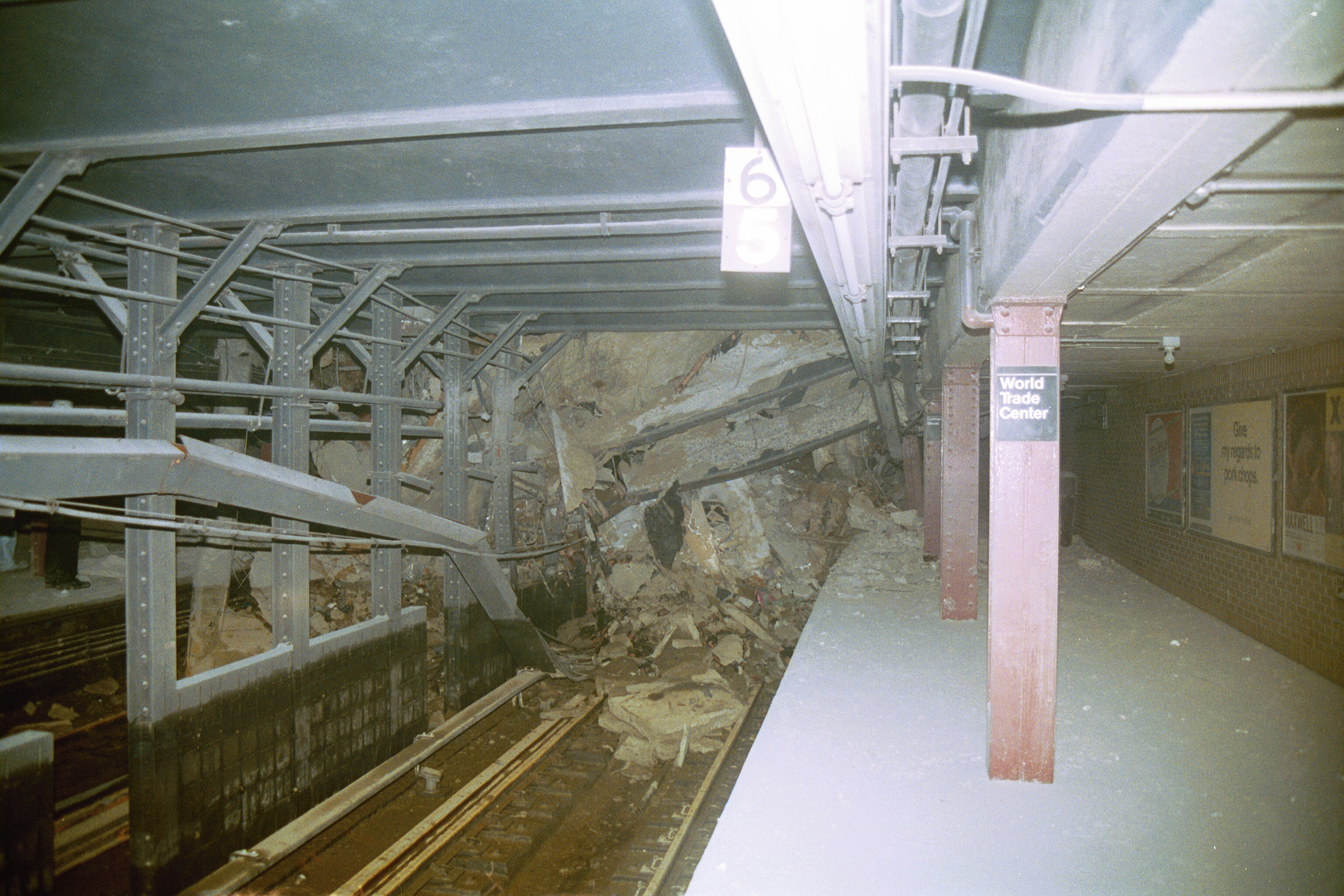
Cortlandt Street station was heavily damaged in the September 11 attacks and needed to be demolished.

The September 11 attacks resulted in service disruptions on lines running through Lower Manhattan. Tracks and stations under the World Trade Center were shut down within minutes of the first plane crash. All remaining New York City Subway service was suspended from 10:20am to 12:48pm. Immediately after the attacks and more so after the collapses of the Twin Towers, many trains running in Lower Manhattan lost power and had to be evacuated through the tunnels. Some trains had power, but the signals did not, requiring special operating procedures to ensure safety.

The IRT Broadway–Seventh Avenue Line, which ran below the World Trade Center between Chambers Street and Rector Street was the most destroyed. Sections of the tunnel as well as Cortlandt Street were badly damaged and had to be rebuilt. Service was immediately suspended south of Chambers Street and then cut back to 14th Street. There was also subsequent flooding on the line south of 34th Street–Penn Station. After the flood was cleaned up, express service was able to resume on September 17 with 1 trains running between Van Cortlandt Park–242nd Street and 14th Street, making local stops north of and express stops south of 96th Street, while 2 and 3 trains made all stops in Manhattan (but bypassed all stations between Canal Street and Fulton Street until October 1). 1/9 skip-stop service was suspended.

After a few switching delays at 96th Street, service was changed on September 19. The 1 train resumed local service in Manhattan, but was extended to New Lots Avenue in Brooklyn (switching onto the express tracks at Chambers Street) to replace the 3, which now terminated at 14th Street as an express. The 2 train continued to make local stops in Manhattan and service between Chambers Street and South Ferry as well as skip-stop service remained suspended. Normal service on all four trains was restored September 15, 2002. The Cortlandt Street station needed extensive reconstruction, and after a total rebuild costing $158 million, it reopened on September 8, 2018.

Service on the BMT Broadway Line was also disrupted because the tracks from the Montague Street Tunnel run adjacent to the World Trade Center and there were concerns that train movements could cause unsafe settling of the debris pile. Cortlandt Street station, which sits under Church Street, sustained significant damage in the collapse of the towers. It was closed until September 15, 2002, for removal of debris, structural repairs, and restoration of the track beds, which had suffered flood damage in the aftermath of the collapse.

Starting September 17, 2001, the N and R service was suspended and respectively replaced by the M (which was extended to Coney Island–Stillwell Avenue via the BMT Montague Street Tunnel, BMT Fourth Avenue Line, and BMT Sea Beach Line) and the J (also extended via Fourth Avenue to Bay Ridge–95th Street). In Queens, the Q replaced the R while the W replaced the N. All service on the BMT Broadway Line ran local north of Canal Street except for the Q, which ran normally from 57th Street to Brighton Beach via Broadway and Brighton Express. J/Z skip-stop service was suspended at this time. Normal service on all seven trains resumed on October 28.

The only subway line running between Midtown and Lower Manhattan at a close proximity to the former World Trade Center Complex was the IRT Lexington Avenue Line, which was overcrowded before the attacks and at crush density until the BMT Broadway Line reopened. Wall Street was closed until September 21.

The IND Eighth Avenue Line, which has a stub terminal serving the E train under Five World Trade Center was not damaged, but covered in soot. E trains were extended to Euclid Avenue, Brooklyn, replacing the then suspended C train (the A and D trains replaced it as the local north of 59th Street–Columbus Circle on nights and weekends, respectively. The B train, which ran normally from 145th Street or Bedford Park Boulevard to 34th Street–Herald Square via Central Park West Local, also replaced C trains on weekdays). Service was cut back to Canal Street when C service resumed on September 21, but Chambers Street and Broadway–Nassau Street remained closed until October 1. World Trade Center remained closed until January 2002.

=== Later 2000s ===
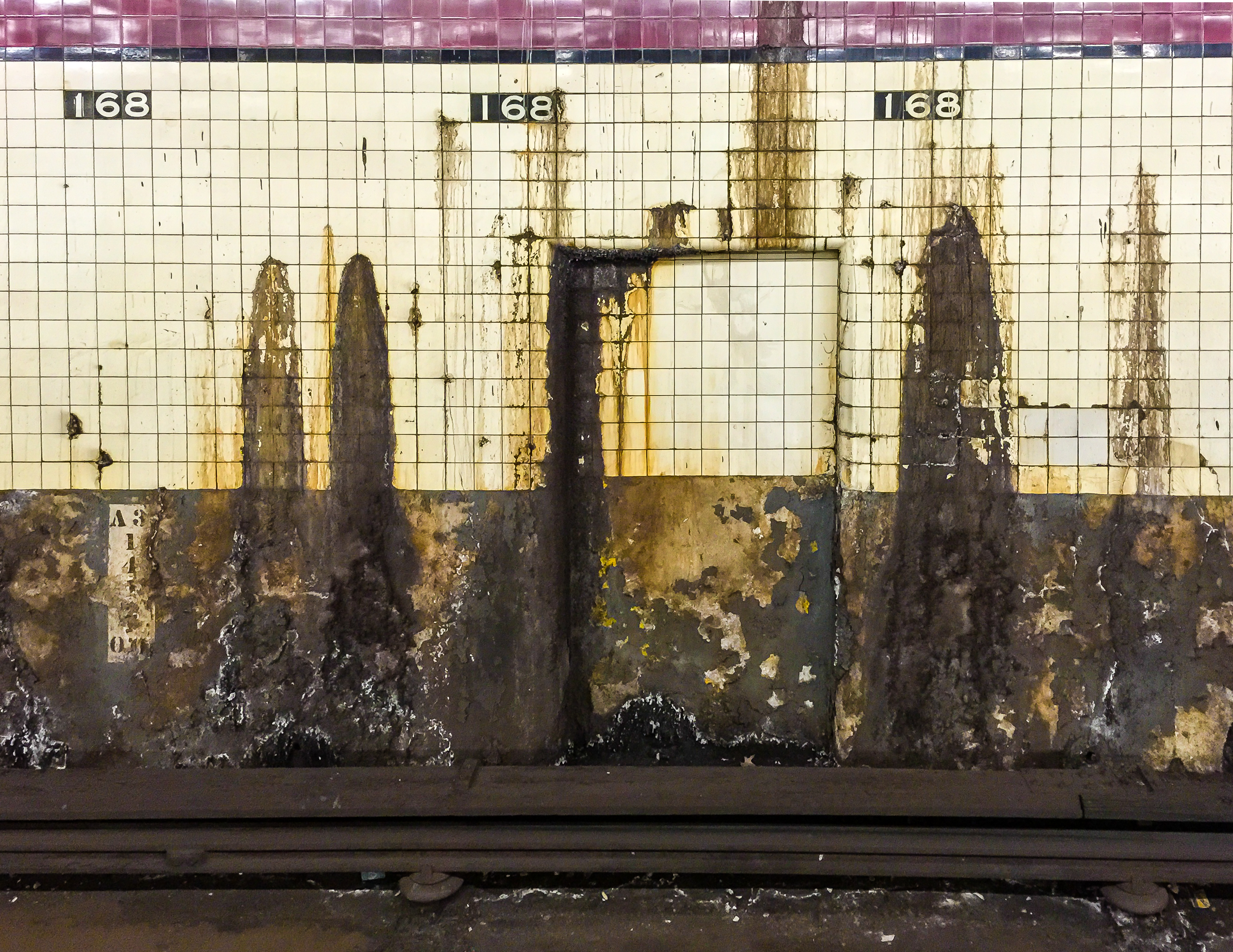
With many parts of the system approaching or exceeding 100 years of age, general deterioration can be seen in many subway stations.

==== Ridership increases ====
Generally, ridership kept rising as the subway system improved in its maintenance, cleanliness, frequency, and on-time ratio; ridership started to increase as graffiti and crime rates dropped heavily after 1989. From 1995 to 2005, ridership on city buses and subways grew by 36%, compared with a population gain in the city of 7%. With dramatic increases in fuel prices in 2008, as well as increased tourism and residential growth, ridership on buses and subways grew 3.1% up to about 2.37 billion trips a year compared to 2007. This is the highest ridership since 1965.

By 2013, ridership had reached 1.7 billion riders per year (despite closures related to Hurricane Sandy), a level not seen since 1949. In April 2013, New York magazine reported that the system was more crowded than it had been in the previous 66 years. The subway reached a daily ridership of 6 million for 29 days in 2014, and was expected to record a similar ridership level for 55 days in 2015; by comparison, in 2013, daily ridership never reached 6 million.

==== Expansions ====
Several expansions started construction or were opened during the mayoralty of Michael Bloomberg from 2002 to 2013. The IND 63rd Street Line's connection to the IND Queens Boulevard Line was first, opened on December 16, 2001. To serve the new connection, the F train was rerouted via the 63rd Street Line, and to replace the F along 53rd Street, a new V train was created–running between Forest Hills–71st Avenue and Second Avenue via the Queens Boulevard and Sixth Avenue local tracks. The G, to allow for room to operate the V, was cut back to Court Square. Two out-of-system transfers were put into place; the first was to allow F passengers to continue to have a free transfer to the Lexington Avenue Line, which was lost when the line was rerouted–the transfer connects the Lexington Avenue/59th Street station and the Lexington Avenue–63rd Street stations. The second one connected the Court Square station with the 45th Road–Court House Square station.

In 2003, money was allocated for the construction of a new station at South Ferry, and in 2005, construction commenced on the new station. Initially, the station's construction had been opposed because of the high cost and low perceived time savings. The South Ferry loop station only accommodates the first five cars of a train, so that the rear five cars of a 10-car 1 train cannot load or unload. Because of the curve at the station gap fillers are required, and as a result the new station was built as a two-track, full (10-car)-length island platform on a less severe curve, permitting the operation of a typical terminal station. The MTA claimed that the new station saved four to six minutes of a passenger's trip time and increased the peak capacity of the 1 service to 24 trains per hour, as opposed to 16 to 17 trains per hour with the loop station.

In the late 1990s and early 2000s, talk began to circulate about taking up the construction of the Second Avenue Subway. Most New Yorkers regarded these plans with cynicism, since citizens were promised the line since well before the Third Avenue elevated was torn down in 1955. Funds have been set aside and environmental impact reports have been completed. A tunnelling contract was awarded to the S3 consortium of Schiavone, Shea and Skanska by the MTA on March 20, 2007. This followed preliminary engineering and a final tunnel design completed by a joint venture between Aecom and Arup. A ceremonial groundbreaking for the subway was held on April 12, 2007, and contractor work to prepare the project's initial construction site at 96th Street and Second Avenue began on April 23, 2007.

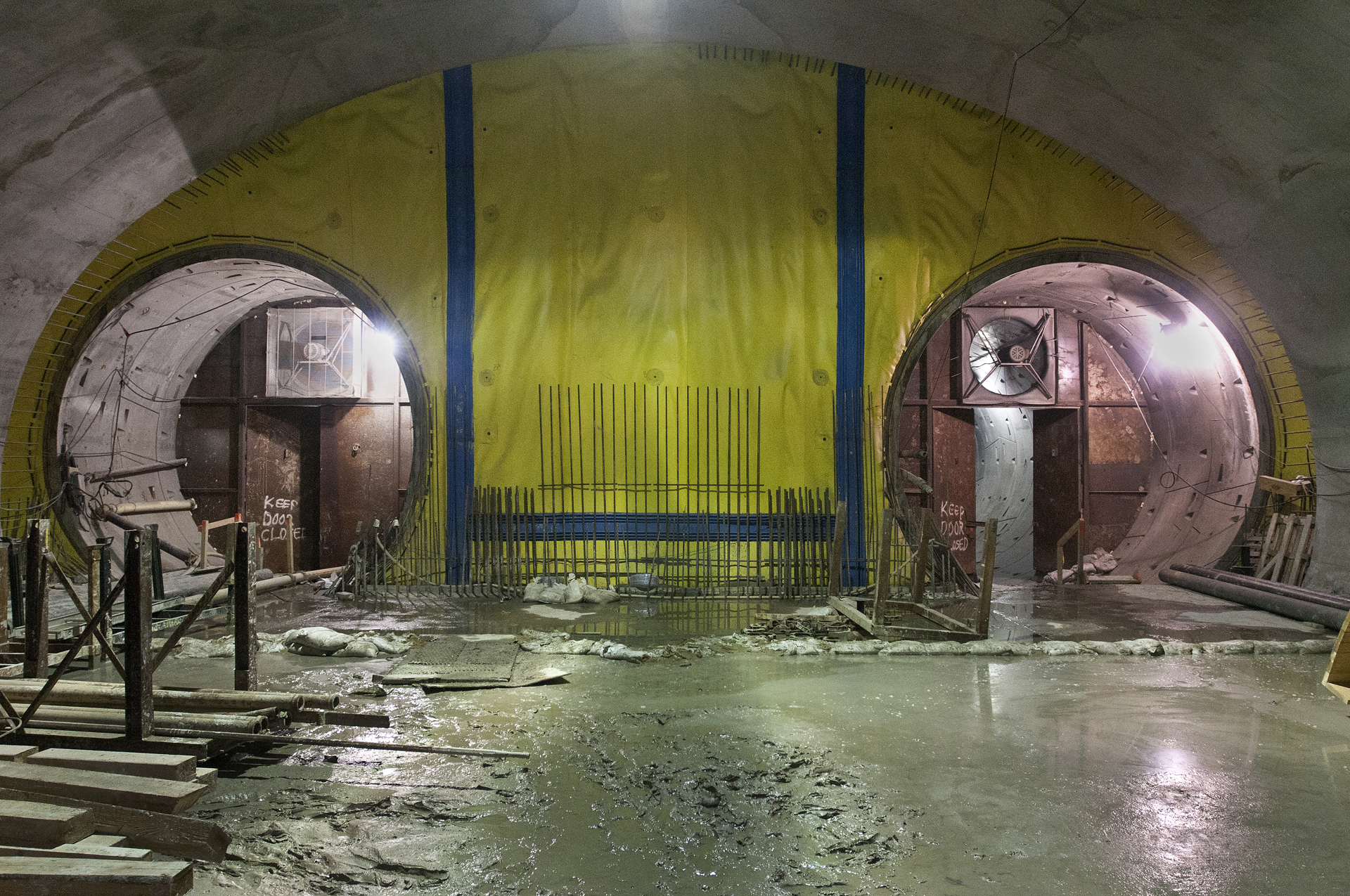
7 Subway Extension construction in June 2011

In October 2007, the 7 Subway Extension construction contract was awarded, extending the IRT Flushing Line to 34th Street. Groundbreaking began in June 2008 and the tunnels were completed by 2010. The project, which was the first one funded by the city in over 60 years, was intended to aid redevelopment of Hell's Kitchen around the West Side Yard of the Long Island Rail Road.

==== Budget cuts ====
The MTA faced a budget deficit of US$1.2 billion in 2009. This resulted in fare increases (three times from 2008 to 2010) and service reductions (including the elimination of two part-time subway services, the V and W). Several other routes were modified as a result of the deficit. The N was made a full-time local in Manhattan (in contrast to being a weekend local/weekday express before 2010), while the Q was extended nine stations north to Astoria–Ditmars Boulevard on weekdays, both to cover the discontinued W. The M was combined with the V, routing it over the Chrystie Street Connection, IND Sixth Avenue Line and IND Queens Boulevard Line to Forest Hills–71st Avenue on weekdays instead of via the BMT Fourth Avenue Line and BMT West End Line to Bay Parkway. The G was truncated to Court Square full-time. Construction headways on eleven routes were lengthened, and off-peak service on seven routes were lengthened.

=== 2010s and 2020s ===
==== Hurricane Sandy damage ====
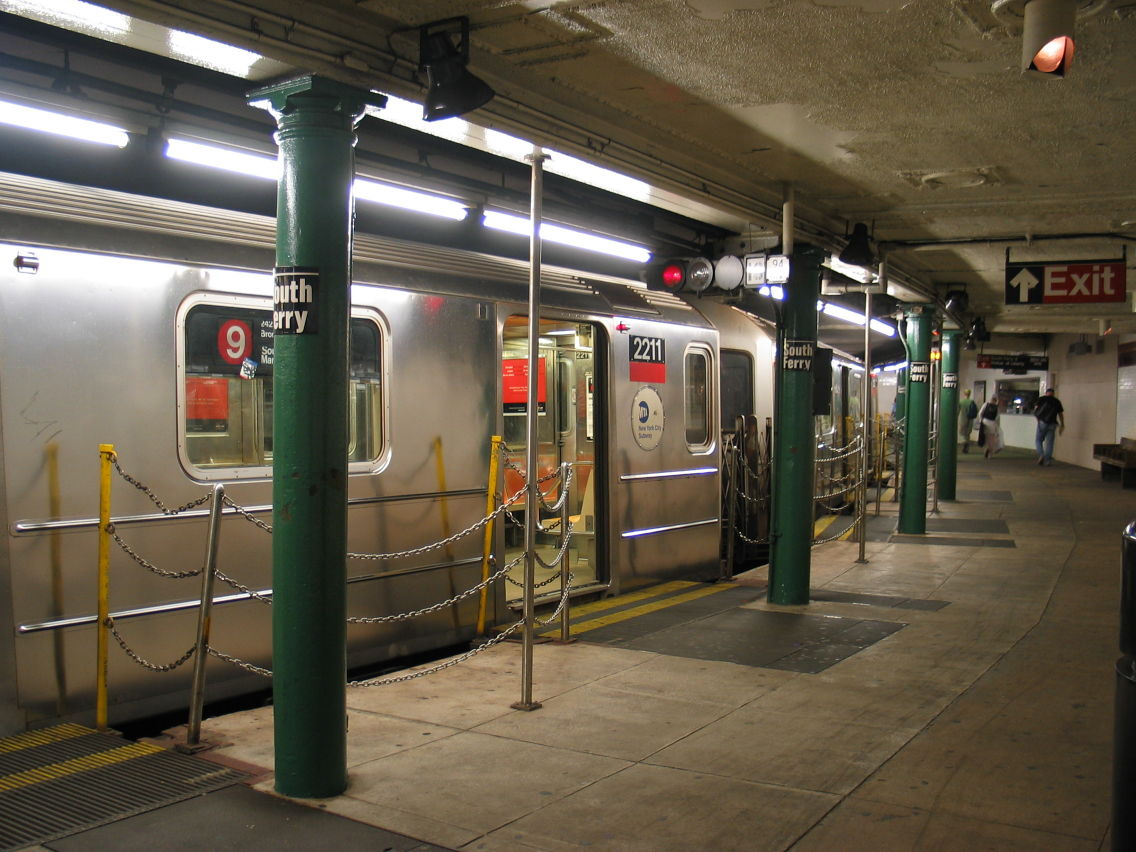
The old South Ferry loop station closed between March 16, 2009, and April 4, 2013. It closed permanently in June 2017.

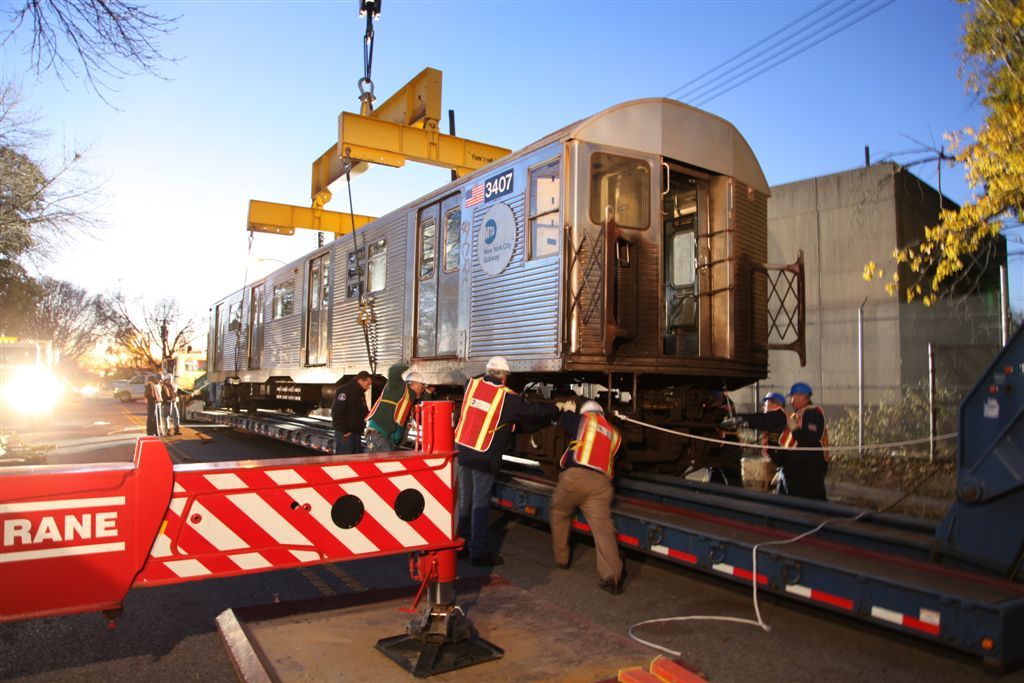
Hurricane Sandy caused serious damage to the IND Rockaway Line and isolated one part of the line from the rest of the system, requiring the NYCTA to truck in 20 subway cars to the line to provide some interim service in the Rockaways. This shows one of the cars being loaded onto a flatbed to be carried to the Rockaways.

On October 28, 2012, a full closure of the subway was ordered the day before the arrival of Hurricane Sandy. All services on the subway, the Long Island Rail Road and Metro-North were gradually shut down that evening. The storm caused serious damage to the system, especially the IND Rockaway Line, which had many sections between Howard Beach–JFK Airport and Hammels Wye on the Rockaway Peninsula heavily damaged, leaving it essentially isolated from the rest of the system. This required the NYCTA to truck in 20 R32 subway cars to the line to provide some interim service, which was temporarily designated the H. The H ran between Beach 90th Street and Far Rockaway–Mott Avenue, where passengers could transfer to a free shuttle bus. The line reopened on May 30, 2013, with a new retaining wall along the line to prevent against future storm surges.

Several of the system's tunnels under the East River were flooded by the storm surge. The South Ferry station suffered serious water damage, and on April 4, 2013, the older loop-configured station reopened to provide temporary service. The first tunnel to be repaired, the Greenpoint Tube under Newtown Creek, was fixed during a series of weekend closures in 2013 and a full closure during summer 2014. The second tunnel, the Montague Street Tunnel, was closed completely from August 2013 to September 2014.

Hurricane Sandy also damaged the Clark Street Tubes, necessitating a full closure on weekends between June 2017 and June 2018, thus affecting 2, 3, 4, and 5 service. The new South Ferry station reopened on June 27, 2017, in time to accommodate the Clark Street closures. A week after South Ferry reopened, the MTA closed the BMT Myrtle Avenue Line for ten months to rebuild two of the line's viaducts, the 310-foot-long (94 m) approaches to the line's junction with the BMT Jamaica Line and Fresh Pond Bridge over the Montauk Branch in Queens. This was in preparation for a reconstruction of the BMT Canarsie Line tunnels under the East River.

The MTA also planned to completely close the BMT Canarsie Line west of Bedford Avenue for 18 months between early 2019 and mid-2020. In April 2017, the shutdown was shortened to 15 months. The closure was changed to a night and weekend shutdown in January 2019.

Other rehabilitation projects included:

- Covering over 3,200 openings at ground level. As of March 2019, there are 19 contracts in progress and 11 contracts pending. In addition, a preventive measure, 68 subway entrances in Lower Manhattan are also receiving fabric plugs that are intended to keep flood water out. In 2017, 3,000-pound (1,400 kg) waterproof doors and curtains were installed in 24 Lower Manhattan locations at a cost of $30,000 each.
- Adding flood mitigation measures, like barriers, to the Coney Island, 207th Street, and Lenox subway yards
- Adding flood mitigation measures to the IND Rockaway Line
- Rebuilding other tubes. As of March 2019, the Steinway, 53rd Street, Cranberry, and Joralemon tunnels had been repaired, in addition to the Crosstown, Montague Street, and Clark Street tunnels. The Rutgers Street Tunnel was pending repairs.

==== Expansions open ====
Originally budgeted at $400 million, the new South Ferry station opened in 2009 at a total of $530 million, with most of the money being a grant from the Federal Transit Administration earmarked for World Trade Center reconstruction. In January 2009, the opening was delayed because the tracks were too far from the edge of the platform. Other delays were attributed to leaks in the station. The problem was corrected and the station opened on March 16, 2009. With the opening of the new station, a transfer was available to the Whitehall Street station with a new connecting passageway.

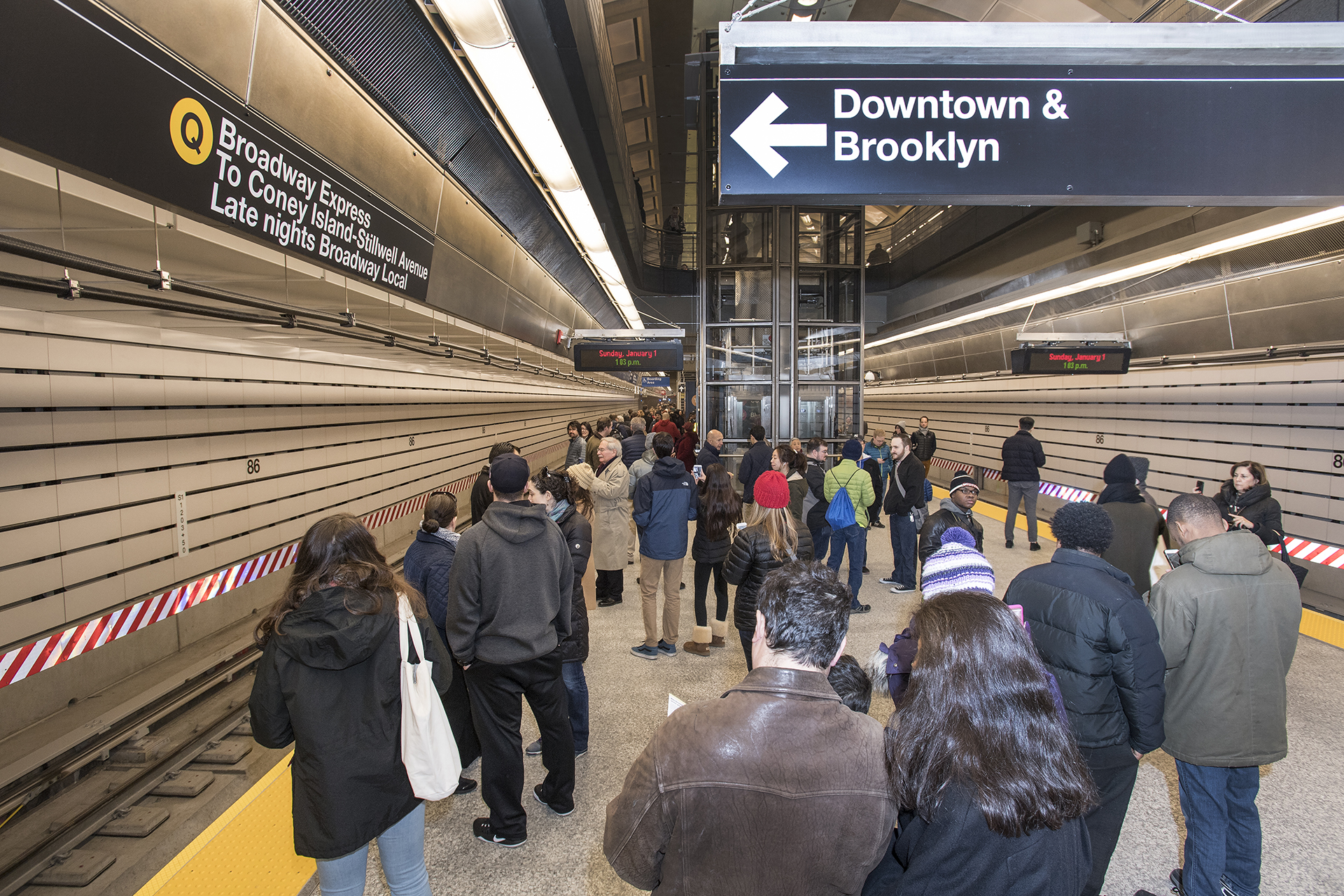
The opening of the Second Avenue Subway at 86th Street

The 7 Subway Extension originally was expected to open in 2014, but did not open until September 13, 2015. According to The New York Times, the delay in the extension's opening was due to the installation of custom-made incline elevators that kept malfunctioning. The Fulton Center building opened to the public on November 10, 2014, completing a decade-long refurbishment of the Fulton Street station in lower Manhattan. It was controversially funded as part of the post-9/11 rebuilding project. As part of the opening of the Second Avenue Subway, W service, which had not run since 2010, was restored on November 7, 2016. On January 1, 2017, the Second Avenue Subway was opened.

==== 2017 state of emergency ====
Underlying the fanfare of expansions, however, there was a gradual decline in maintenance of the subway, and consequently, fewer trains started arriving to their destinations on time. Maintenance spending declined before rising again from the 1990s to 2012, but on-time performance slowly eroded during that same time period. By 2017, only 65% of weekday trains reached their destinations on time, the lowest rate since the transit crisis of the 1970s. In the summer of that year, the subway system was officially put in a state of emergency after a series of derailments, track fires, and overcrowding incidents.

To solve the system's problems, the MTA officially announced the Genius Transit Challenge on June 28, 2017, where contestants could submit ideas to improve signals, communications infrastructure, or rolling stock. On July 25, 2017, Chairman Joe Lhota announced a two-phase, $9 billion New York City Subway Action Plan to stabilize the subway system and to prevent the continuing decline of the system. The first phase, costing $836 million, consisted of five categories of improvements; the $8 billion second phase would implement the winning proposals from the Genius Transit Challenge and fix more widespread problems. Six winning submissions for the Genius Transit Challenge were announced in March 2018.

In October 2017, city comptroller Scott Stringer released an analysis of the effect of subway delays on the economy and on commuters. The study found that based on a normal wait time of 5 minutes and an average wage of $34 per hour in 2016, "worst-case" subway delays of more than 20 minutes could cost up to $389 million annually in lost productivity. By comparison, "mid-case" delays of between 10 and 20 minutes could cost $243.1 million per year, and "best-case" delays of between 5 and 10 minutes could cost $170.2 million per year.

In November 2017, The New York Times published its investigation into the crisis. It found that the crisis had arisen as a result of financially unsound decisions by local and state politicians from both the Democratic and Republican parties. By this time, the subway's 65% average on-time performance was the lowest among all major cities' transit systems, and every non-shuttle subway route's on-time performance had declined in the previous ten years.

Several improvements were made in response to the transit crisis. In the short term, signals, trains, and tracks were improved under the "Fast Forward" program. Further, the MTA's 2020–2024 capital plan called for adding elevators and ramps to 66 subway stations and adding modern signaling systems to parts of six more physical lines, to be funded by congestion pricing in Manhattan. Additionally, several other changes were proposed to improve service. For instance, in February 2019, several politicians wrote a letter to the MTA, asking the agency to consider splitting the R train in half to increase reliability. In January 2020, Stringer sent a letter to NYCTA president Andy Byford stated that the "abundance" of shuttered entry points along subway routes was contributing to severe overcrowding and longer commute times, and requested that the MTA develop and publicize plans for restoring closed entry points. The state of emergency ended on June 30, 2021, after previously being renewed 49 times.

==== Planning of new lines ====
There are several lines under consideration. This includes a subway line under Utica Avenue in Brooklyn; an outer-borough circumferential line, the Triboro RX; a reuse of the northern part of the Rockaway Beach Branch; and a line to LaGuardia Airport. The Triboro RX proposal later became the Interborough Express light-rail line, the development of which was formally announced in 2023.

In November 2016, the MTA requested that the Second Avenue Subway's Phase 2 project be entered into the Project Development phase under the Federal Transit Administration's New Starts program. The FTA granted this request in late December 2016; The line will eventually comprise four phases, running as far north as 125th Street in East Harlem during Phase 2, and south to Hanover Square in Lower Manhattan in Phases 3 and 4. The MTA began soliciting bids in July 2023 for the first Phase 2 construction contract. Groundbreaking for Phase 2 took place on June 8, 2026; the tunnels were planned to be completed in 2032.

==== COVID-19 pandemic and crime concerns ====
The spread of the COVID-19 pandemic to the New York City area in March 2020 resulted in mass closures of gathering spaces. After the MTA recommended that only essential workers use the New York City Subway, ridership started to decrease. Part-time services were temporarily suspended. Starting on May 6, 2020, stations were closed overnight for cleaning, in what became the first planned overnight closure in the subway's history. The overnight closures were to be suspended once the pandemic was over, and bus service was added. In early May 2021, Governor Andrew Cuomo announced that the overnight subway closures would end on May 17, 2021, with 24-hour service resuming on that date.

In February 2021, the New York City Subway removed benches from several stations in an effort to reduce the number of homeless persons sleeping on them, which during the COVID-19 pandemic was considered to be unsanitary. This move drew considerable backlash from riders who alleged that the removal of the benches amounts to disenfranchising disabled people and senior citizens, as well as being unfair to homeless populations. On September 7, 2022, the mask mandate on public transit was lifted.

Although ridership decreased by 40 percent from 2019 to 2022, the number of crimes in the system remained roughly the same, prompting riders to express concerns over increased crime. There had been six murders in the subway in 2020; the following year, the subway recorded eight murders, the highest annual total in 25 years. During the pandemic, the subway system experienced several high-profile incidents, including a January 2022 shoving death of a passenger in Times Square and an April 2022 mass shooting in Brooklyn. As of October 2022, crime in the system had increased 40 percent from the previous year; the number of crimes recorded to date was roughly the same as in 2019, when ridership was much higher. In response, governor Kathy Hochul and mayor Eric Adams announced a plan to increase police presence within the subway system.

Amid an increase in violent crimes in the subway system, Hochul announced a five-point plan to improve subway safety on March 6, 2024. A key element of the plan was the deployment of 250 members of the MTA PD and New York State Police and 750 members of the National Guard on Joint Task Force Empire Shield to conduct baggage checks at busy locations. Hochul also directed the MTA to install new cameras in conductors' cabs to help police identify people targeting them, announced a bill to enable judges to ban people convicted of committing an assault in the system from using the MTA system, and allocated $20 million to expand the Subway Co-Response Outreach Team (SCOUT) program, which was set up in January, to ten teams by the end of 2025, to help individuals with mental health treatment and supportive housing. Finally, she started regular meetings to improve coordination between the MTA, district attorneys and law enforcement. The MTAPD would also develop a system to flag recidivist offenders to the offices of district attorneys while individuals are booked for crimes, and the MTA would hire a Criminal Justice Advocate to help victims of crime in the system. On December 18, 2024, Hochul deployed 250 more members of the National Guard to the subway, and announced that all subway cars now had security cameras.

On January 14, 2025, Governor Hochul announced another set of safety initiatives, including temporarily surging 750 NYPD officers into the system and having 300 additional officers on trains so there could be a uniformed officer on every train between 9 p.m. and 5 a.m., installing LED lighting in all stations to improve visibility, working with the New York CITY Department of Homeless Services to expand a program to add spaces at end-of-line stations for mobile outreach teams to provide services to homeless individuals, and adding platform edge fences at over 100 stations. The platform edge fences would be funded by the Governor, and would go at stations with standard stopping positions for subway cars on portions of the 1, 2, 3, 4, 5, 6, 7, F, M, and L, with stations that had island platforms and higher ridership prioritized. In addition, to reduce fare evasion, 150 stations would have egress delayed at emergency exit gates, and 20 stations would get new fare gates in both 2025 and 2026. The first stations to get the new fare gates would be Delancey Street/Essex Street, 42nd Street–Port Authority Bus Terminal, and Jackson Heights–Roosevelt Avenue/74th Street. On March 6, 2025, the Governor marked the one-year anniversary of her five-point safety plan by noting that year-to-date, arrests were up 71 percent and major crimes decreased by 29 percent, with the subway having the lowest number of crimes outside the pandemic during the previous 30 years.

==== Further upgrades and improvements ====
Several upgrades and improvements were announced in the early 2020s. The new OMNY fare-payment system was implemented across the subway between 2019 and 2020, The MTA announced in 2022 that it would install platform screen doors at three stations, and it reached a legal settlement the same year, agreeing to make 95 percent of subway and Staten Island Railway stations wheelchair-accessible by 2055. Despite decreased ridership due to the COVID-19 pandemic, the MTA had balanced its budget by 2023 while also raising fares and increasing service on several subway routes. In 2024, as part of its 2025–2029 Capital Program, the MTA announced that it would spend billions of dollars on new rolling stock, upgraded signals, and accessibility projects at 60 subway stations.

On July 26, 2022, the MTA announced that all subway tunnels would be wired for cell service and that Wi-Fi would be introduced to all subway and Staten Island Railway stations as part of a public-private partnership with Transit Wireless. Transit Wireless would design, build, and operate the network, and would improve the agency's existing communications system. The company would invest over $600 million in the project. The two sides would share revenue from commercial customers. During the 2025 New York City Democratic mayoral primary, several candidates proposed that the city government take partial control of the subway system, including Andrew Cuomo, who was running as an independent candidate.

== See also ==
- History of the New York City Subway (to 1940)
- History of New York City transportation
