= 1928 Times Square derailment =

New York City Subway derailment

Coordinates: 40.755636°N 73.985951°W

Details
- Date: August 24, 1928; 98 years ago
- Location: Near Times Square station
- Country: United States
- Line: IRT Broadway–Seventh Avenue Line
- Operator: Interborough Rapid Transit Company
- Incident type: Derailment
- Cause: Faulty switch; untrained operator

Statistics
- Trains: 1
- Deaths: 18
- Injured: Approximately 100

During the evening rush hour on August 24, 1928, an express subway train derailed immediately after leaving the Times Square station on the IRT Broadway–Seventh Avenue Line. Sixteen people were killed at the scene, two died later, and about 100 were injured. It remains the second-deadliest accident on the New York City Subway system, after the Malbone Street wreck.

== Accident ==
At 5:09 p.m. on August 24, 1928, the last two cars of a ten-car downtown express train, consisting of all-steel cars, were derailed when a faulty switch moved. The ninth car hit a wall and pillars on either side of the track and split in half. The rear was telescoped by the last car. The front remained attached to the train and was dragged for 100 or 200 feet (30 or 61 m), when the first and eighth cars turned over. Short-circuiting started a fire.

A witness in one of the damaged cars spoke of hearing "a terrific grinding noise" then seeing "the car behind ours rip right through a steel pillar". Morris DeHaven Tracy of the United Press wrote an account of the crash that had left the city "still dazed":

[The eighth car] "split the switch," and before the passengers jammed within it could raise their cries of terror it was skidding half sideways down the track.

A hundred feet farther on it crashed into one of the great steel pillars which keep the street above from tumbling in upon the tunnels.

It sheared off the pillar, tore loose from the forward seven cars, split itself in two and part of it hurtled forward, tossing passengers against stanchions onto the track, under the wheels of the cars, against the sides of the tunnel, and piling them up in masses on what was left of the car floor.

Sixteen people were killed instantly and 100 or more injured. Additional victims died the following day and on the 26th, as did Jennie Lockridge, an actress who had a heart attack after seeing victims' bodies. One victim was misidentified; the man returned home two hours before his funeral was scheduled to start. It was the worst accident on the New York City Subway since the Malbone Street Wreck in 1918.

Track maintenance workers had discovered the faulty switch where a storage track branched off 85 feet (26 m) south of the platform, but decided not to spike (immobilize) it. The train had been held in the station while repairs were made, and was packed with approximately 1,800 passengers. An empty train was first sent over the switch without incident.

== Aftermath and investigation ==
Some newspapers ran a photograph taken soon after the accident, which showed a view into the street where emergency vehicles and police were gathering. It had been transmitted over the telephone to the NEA Service in San Francisco. Approximately 50 doctors used the station platform to render first aid. The wreckage was then cleared using acetylene torches and hand carts while three blocks of Seventh Avenue were blocked off to enable removal of the debris. Full service on the subway was restored about 12 hours after the accident. A section of 40th Street west of Broadway remained closed because the crash had damaged its underpinnings.

The accident was blamed on human error, but the precise cause was never established. However, it was known that the switch should have been spiked closed. The maintenance foreman on the scene, William Baldwin, said at the time that someone in the signaling tower located in the tunnel south of 40th Street must have pushed the button to open the switch, but the towerman, Harry King, maintained that no one had, leading to the suspicion that Baldwin had activated it from trackside with his assistant holding down the automatic brake tripper. The New York Transit Commission later took this view.

Baldwin was initially charged with negligent homicide in the then 15 deaths and released on $10,000 bail. It was later found that King was actually a clerk, not a trained towerman. In early October, he admitted that he had been using a false identity and was really Harry Stockdale, a man from Baltimore who had been convicted in a stabbing there. The charges against Baldwin were dismissed, and King was imprisoned instead.

Mayor Jimmy Walker used the accident together with a fare hike to denounce the transit companies.
