= Morris DeHaven Tracy =

American journalist (1890–1940)

Morris DeHaven Tracy (August 6, 1890 – May 11, 1940) was a prominent American journalist of the 1920s and 1930s, who covered for the United Press wire service many of the important stories of the day, such as the Scopes Evolution Trial, the election of Pope Pius XII, and the tour of Canada of the Prince of Wales.

== Life ==
He was born on August 6, 1890, in Hydesville, California, to Joseph and Harriet (Morris) Tracy. He was the grandson of the historian and Congregational minister Rev. Joseph Tracy. From 1908, he worked for the local Humboldt County newspapers covering the numerous shipwrecks along the Northern California coast. His coverage of the wreck of the passenger liner Bear in 1916 earned him a place in the San Francisco bureau of the United Press, where he was responsible for one of the most important scoops of the time, the reelection of Woodrow Wilson over Charles Evans Hughes. Through his connections with the Humboldt County clerk, Fred Kay, Tracy heard of errors in the initial reported tabulation, and became the first to confirm the election for Wilson.

He became a bureau manager for the United Press in Los Angeles, San Francisco, New York, and Washington, D.C. In 1927, he co-authored with Dale Van Every the best-selling book Charles Lindbergh - His Life.

In 1934, after the death of his first wife, he resigned from the United Press and attempted to write his journalistic memoirs, but by 1935 he joined the Boston Traveller as a columnist and special assignment reporter.

Morris Tracy married Mildred Hunter in 1913; they had two children, Grace Eleanor and Mary Harriet. Mildred died in 1933, and he married Frances Gray in 1935. Tracy died of coronary thrombosis on May 11, 1940, while vacationing in Pinehurst, North Carolina.
