= Beach 60th Street station =

New York City Subway station in Queens

Beach 60 Street
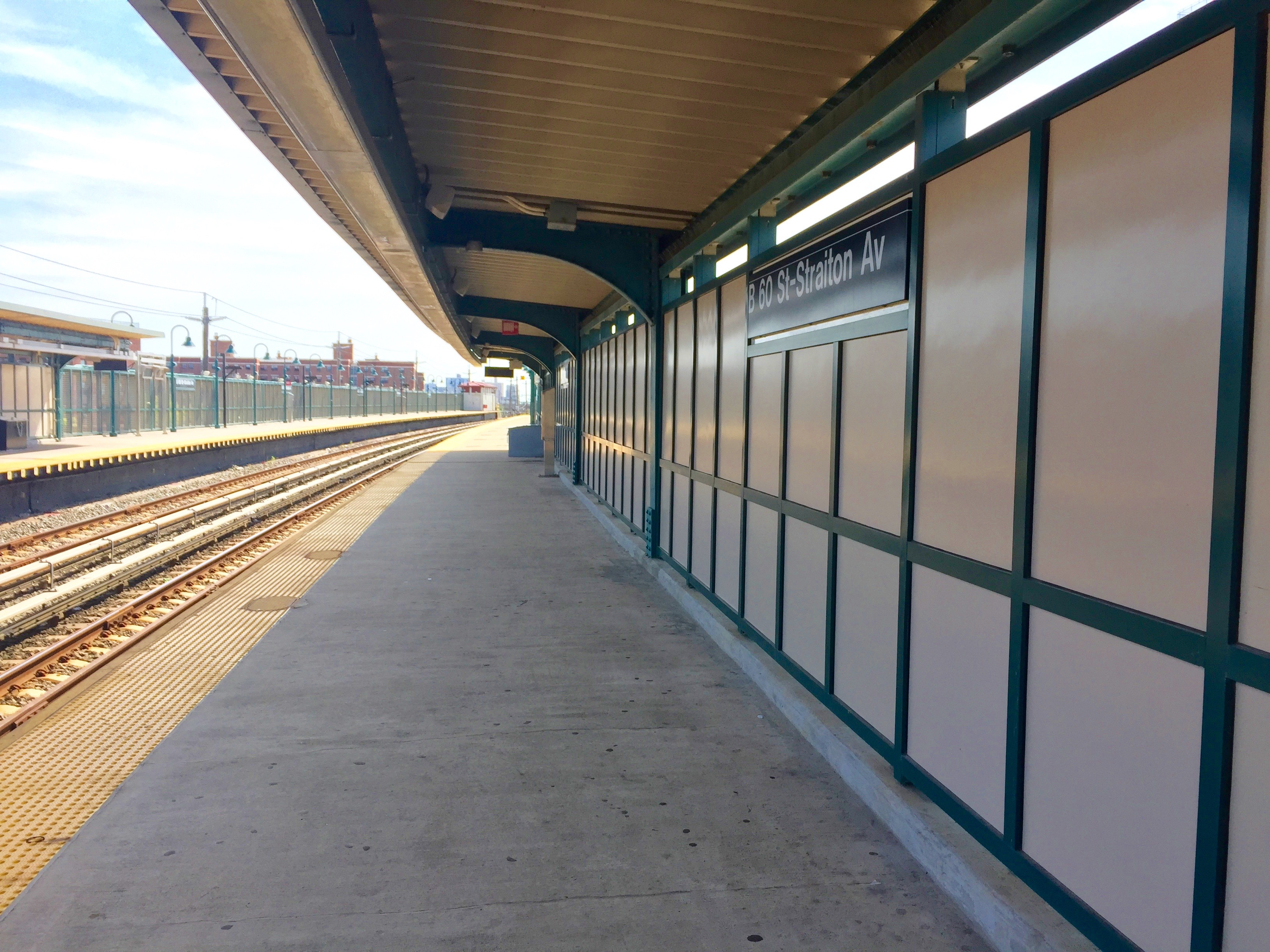
- Southbound platform

Station statistics
- Address: Beach 60th Street & Rockaway Freeway; Queens, New York
- Borough: Queens
- Locale: Arverne; Edgemere
- Coordinates: 40.592395°N 73.788536°W
- Division: B (IND, formerly LIRR Far Rockaway Branch)
- Line: IND Rockaway Line
- Services: A (all times)
- Transit: MTA Bus: Q22, Q52 SBS
- Structure: Elevated
- Platforms: 2 side platforms
- Tracks: 2

Other information
- Opened: 1892; 134 years ago (LIRR station)
- Rebuilt: June 28, 1956; 70 years ago (as a Subway station)
- Former/other names: Beach 60th Street–Straiton Avenue; Straiton Avenue; Arverne-Straiton Avenue

Traffic
- 2025: 227,333 ▼29.5%
- Rank: 412 out of 423
Services
Preceding station	New York City Subway	Following station
Beach 67th Street toward Inwood–207th Street	A (New York City Subway service)	Beach 44th Street toward Far Rockaway–Mott Avenue
Former services
Preceding station	Long Island Rail Road	Following station
Frank Avenue toward Valley Stream	Far Rockaway Branch	Arverne toward Hammels
Frank Avenue toward Gibson	Rockaway Beach Division	Arverne toward Woodside
Location
Location within New York City Subway
Location within New York City
Location within New York
Track layout
Street map
Station service legend
Symbol	Description
Stops all times	Stops all times

The Beach 60th Street station (signed as Beach 60th Street–Straiton Avenue) is a station on the IND Rockaway Line of the New York City Subway. Located in Queens on the Rockaway Freeway at Beach 60th Street, it is served by the A train at all times. The station opened in 1892, and was rebuilt in 1942 as an elevated station.

== History ==
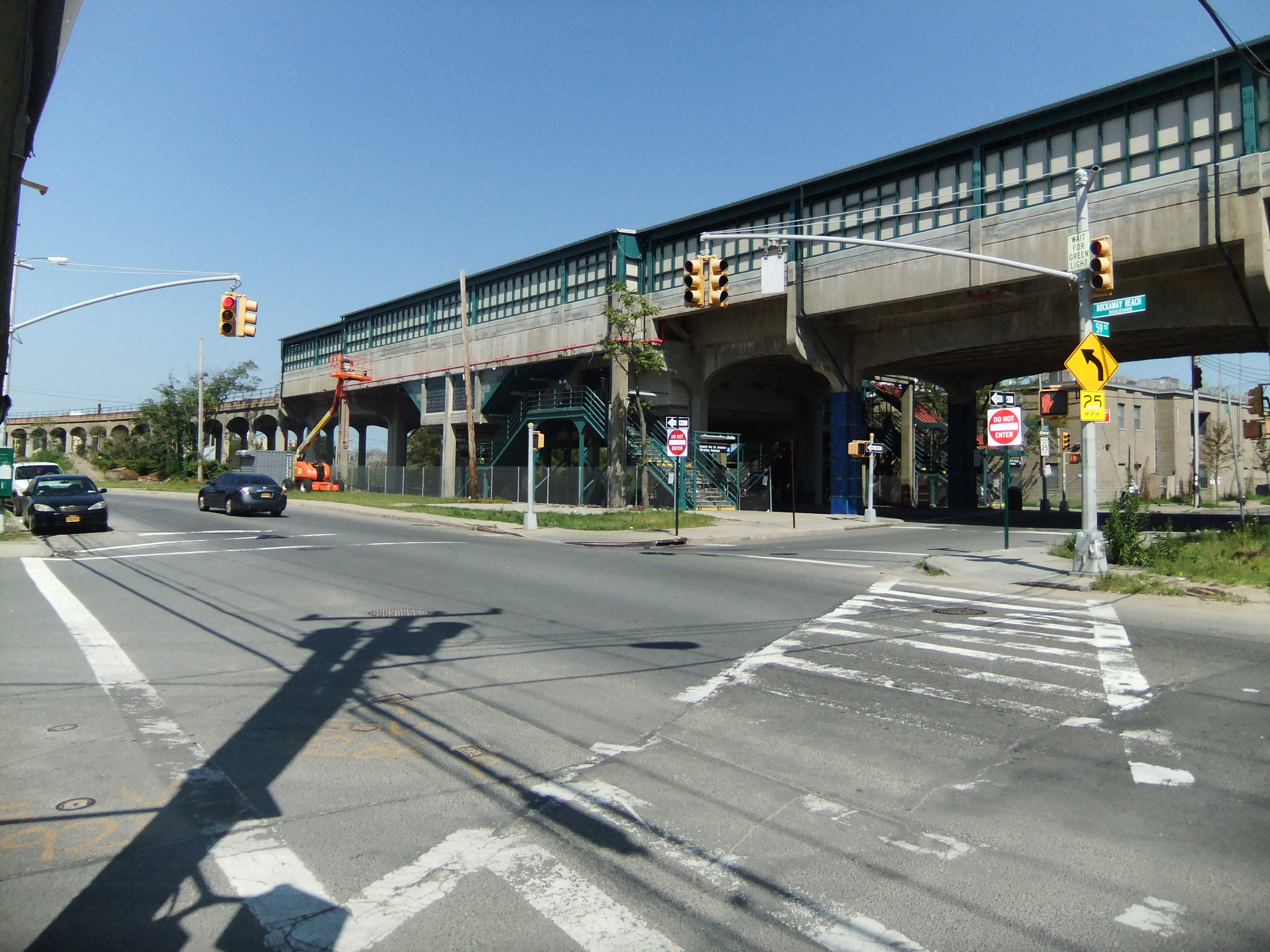
Street stair at Beach 59th Street

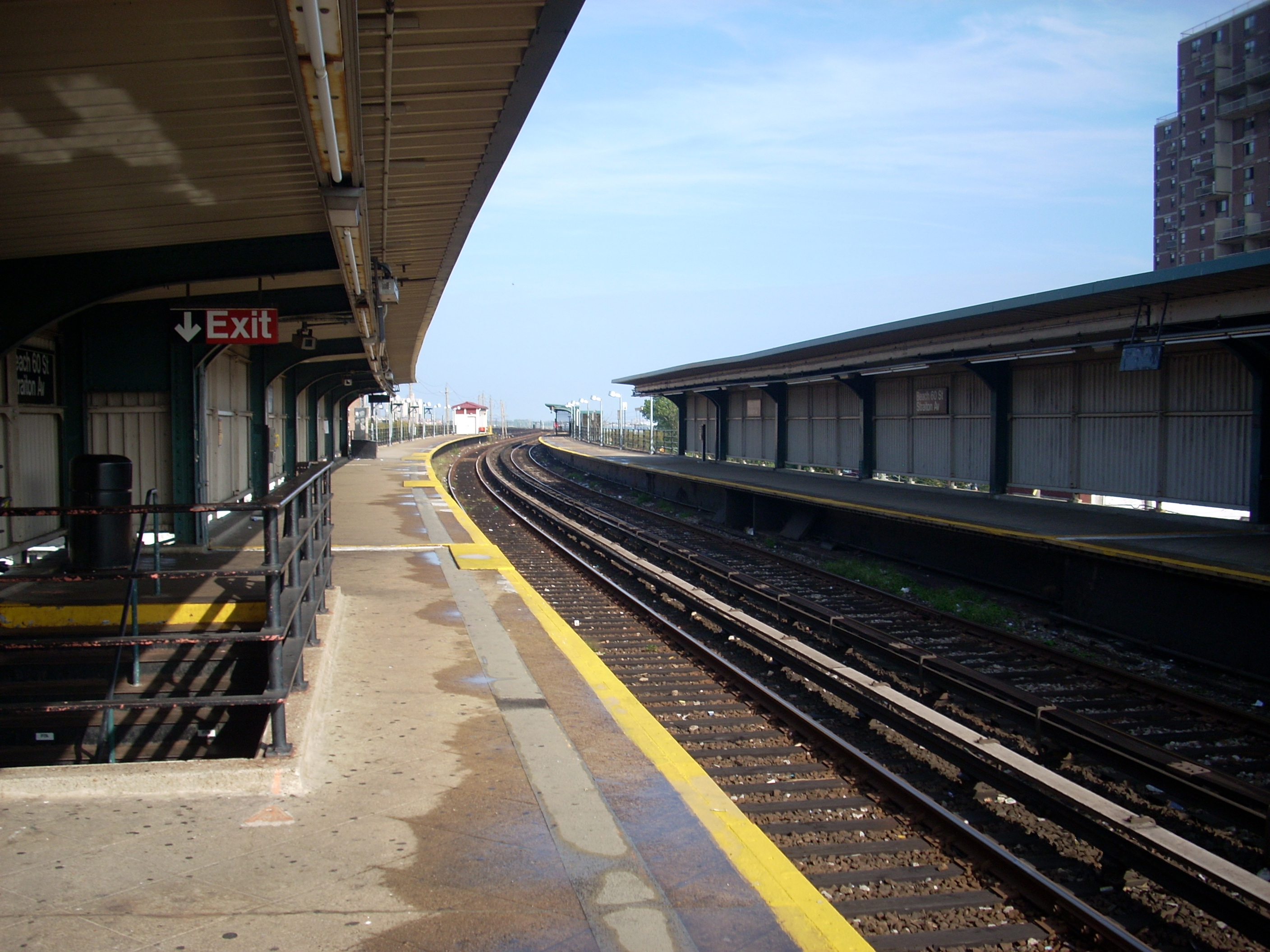
Platforms before 2010 renovation

Beach 60th Street–Straiton Avenue was originally built by the Long Island Rail Road along the Rockaway Beach Branch as Straiton Avenue, also known as Arverne–Straiton Avenue in 1892 as part of a quarrel between the LIRR and New York lawyer and developer Remington Vernam over the original Arverne station on Gaston Avenue. It also served as a trolley stop of the Ocean Electric Railway.

The station was rebuilt as an elevated station, which opened on April 10, 1942. The station was purchased by New York City on October 3, 1955, along with the rest of the Rockaway Beach Branch and Far Rockaway Branch west of Far Rockaway, after a fire on the line's crossing over Jamaica Bay in 1950. Now operated by the New York City Transit Authority, it reopened as a subway station along the IND Rockaway Line on June 28, 1956.

The station was renovated in 2010.

== Station layout ==
This elevated station has two tracks and two side platforms. The station is served by the A train at all times and is between Beach 44th Street to the east (railroad south) and Beach 67th Street to the west (railroad north).

=== Exits ===
The full-time entrance to the station is at the west end and has two stairs to the northeast corner of Rockaway Freeway and Beach 59th Street. The station house under the platform has a turnstile bank, token booth and two staircase to each platform. There is an additional exit-only staircase at the west end of the eastbound platform.
