= Beach 36th Street station =

New York City Subway station in Queens

Beach 36 Street
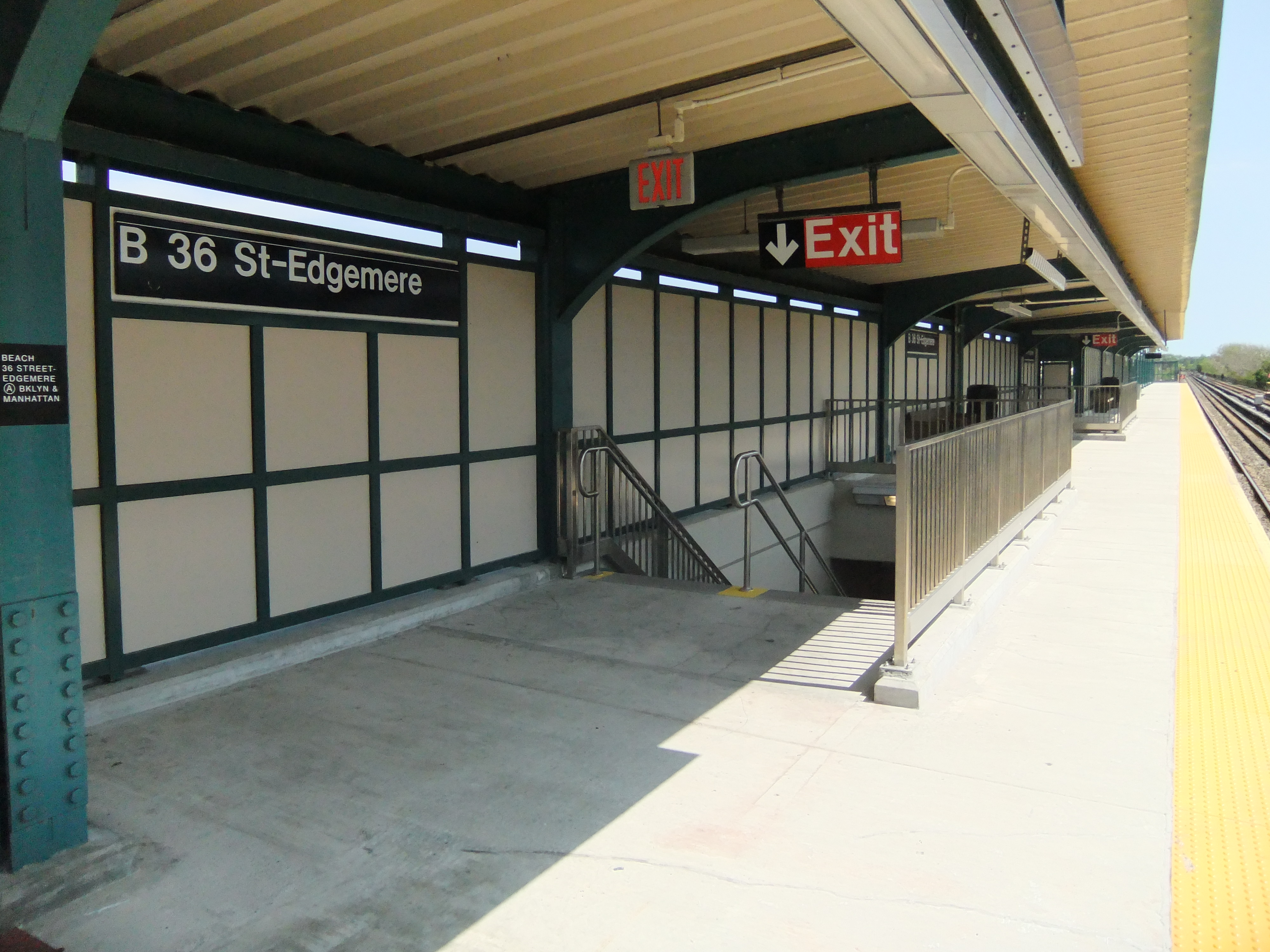
- Northbound platform

Station statistics
- Address: Beach 36th Street & Rockaway Freeway; Edgemere, New York
- Borough: Queens
- Locale: Edgemere
- Coordinates: 40.595413°N 73.768076°W
- Division: B (IND, formerly LIRR Far Rockaway Branch)
- Line: IND Rockaway Line
- Services: A (all times)
- Transit: MTA Bus: Q22, QM17
- Structure: Elevated
- Platforms: 2 side platforms
- Tracks: 2

Other information
- Opened: June 21, 1895; 131 years ago (LIRR station)
- Rebuilt: June 28, 1956; 70 years ago (as a Subway station)
- Accessible: No; planned
- Former/other names: Beach 36th Street–Edgemere

Traffic
- 2025: 102,876 ▼34.3%
- Rank: 419 out of 423
Services
Preceding station	New York City Subway	Following station
Beach 44th Street toward Inwood–207th Street	A (New York City Subway service)	Beach 25th Street toward Far Rockaway–Mott Avenue
Former services
Preceding station	Long Island Rail Road	Following station
Wavecrest toward Valley Stream	Far Rockaway Branch	Frank Avenue toward Hammels
Wavecrest toward Gibson	Rockaway Beach Division	Frank Avenue toward Woodside
Location
Location within New York City Subway
Location within New York City
Location within New York
Track layout
Street map
Station service legend
Symbol	Description
Stops all times	Stops all times

The Beach 36th Street station (signed as Beach 36th Street–Edgemere) is a station on the IND Rockaway Line of the New York City Subway. The station is located at the intersection of Beach 36th Street and Rockaway Freeway in Edgemere, Queens. It is served by the A train at all times.

== History ==
This station was originally opened on June 21, 1895, as part of Long Island Rail Road's Far Rockaway Branch and later as a trolley stop of the Ocean Electric Railway, which was designed to accommodate guests of the former Edgemere Hotel. It was relocated 600 feet east of its former location in August 1940. The elevated station was opened on April 10, 1942. The station was purchased by New York City on October 3, 1955, along with the rest of the Rockaway Beach Branch and Far Rockaway Branch west of Far Rockaway, after a fire on the line's crossing over Jamaica Bay in 1950. Now operated by the New York City Transit Authority, it reopened as a subway station along the IND Rockaway Line on June 28, 1956.

As part of its 2025–2029 Capital Program, the MTA has proposed making the station wheelchair-accessible in compliance with the Americans with Disabilities Act of 1990. The MTA had previously secured an easement for a transit plaza and associated space outside the station.

== Station layout ==
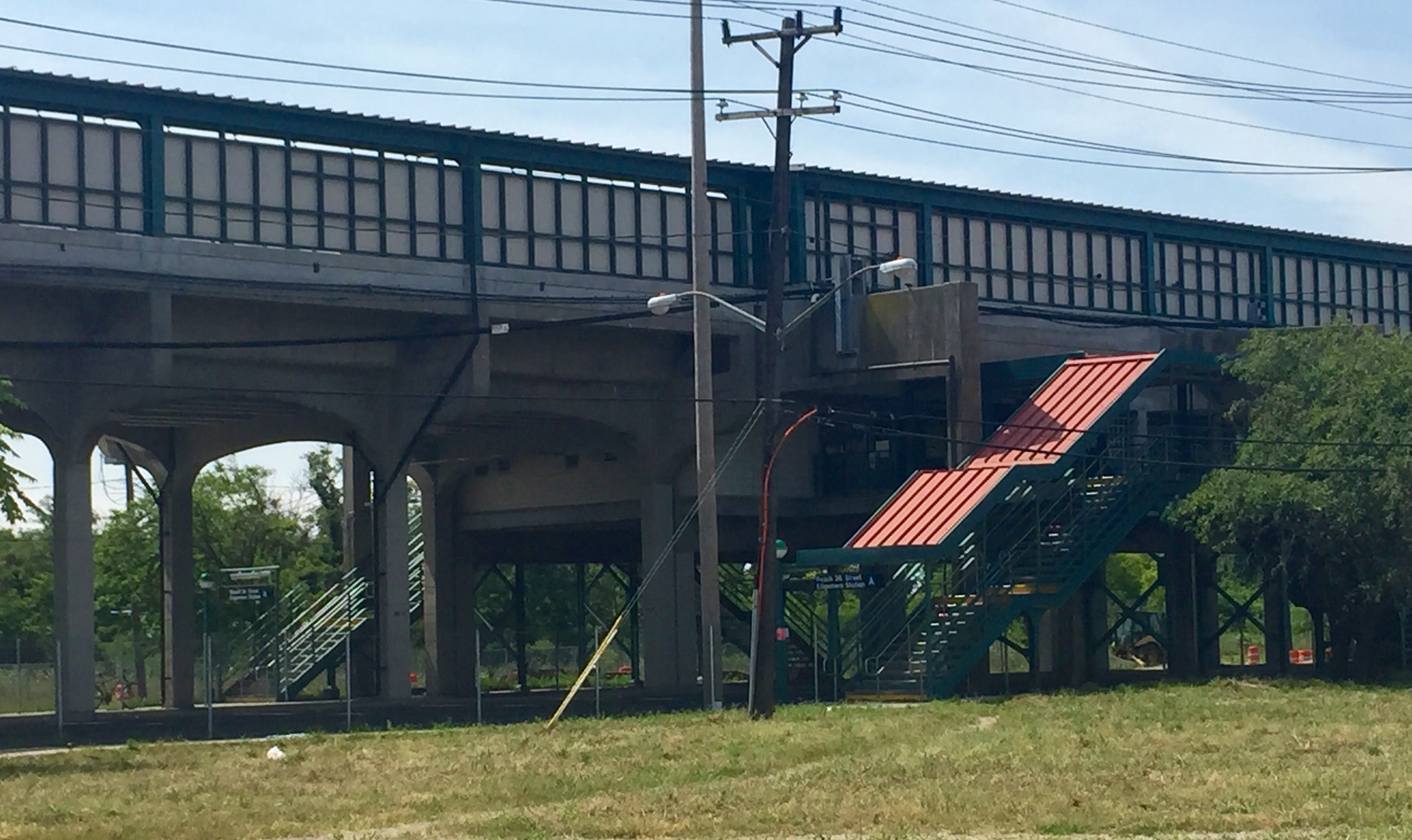
Stairs on the north side of Rockaway Freeway

This elevated station has two tracks and two side platforms. The station is served by the A train at all times and is between Beach 44th Street to the east (railroad south) and Beach 25th Street to the west (railroad north).

Both platforms have beige windscreens and canopies with green support columns in the center and full height metallic fences at both ends.

=== Exits ===
The station's only entrance/exit is an elevated brick station house beneath the tracks. It has a turnstile bank, station agent booth, waiting area that allows a free transfer between directions, two staircases to each platform at the center, and two staircases to either side of Rockaway Freeway between Beach 35th and Beach 36th Streets. The two southern street stairs are connected to the station house with a large canopied overpass.
