= Far Rockaway (disambiguation) =

Far Rockaway, Queens is a neighborhood in Queens, New York City.

Far Rockaway may also refer to:

- Far Rockaway Branch, a branch of the Long Island Rail Road

- Far Rockaway station (LIRR), a station on the LIRR

- Far Rockaway – Mott Avenue (IND Rockaway Line), a New York City Subway station on the S (Rockaway Park Shuttle) train
- Far Rockaway High School, a defunct high school

== See also ==
- Rockaway Peninsula
