= Beach 44th Street station =

New York City Subway station in Queens

Beach 44 Street
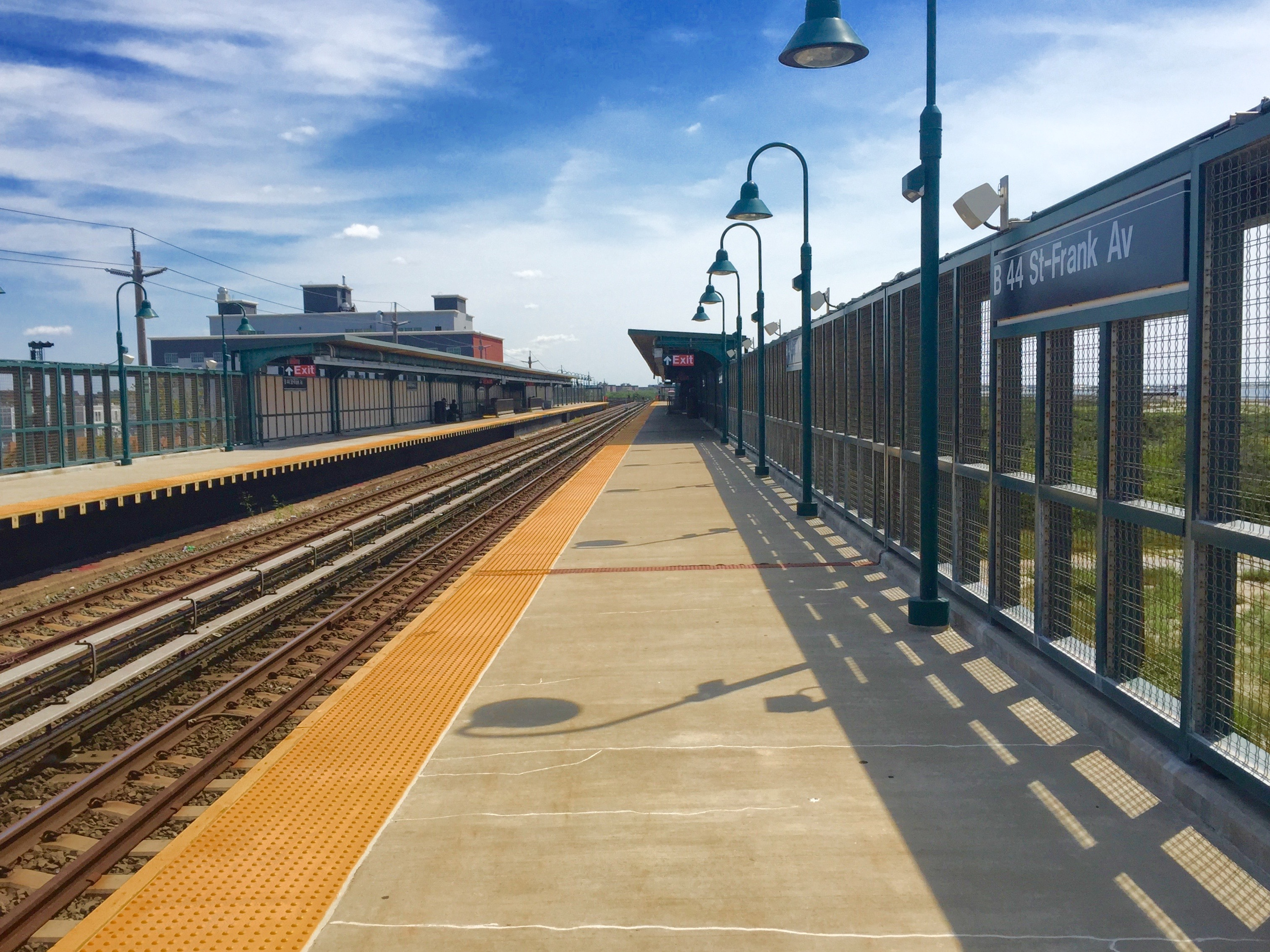
- Southbound platform

Station statistics
- Address: Beach 44th Street & Rockaway Freeway; Queens, New York
- Borough: Queens
- Locale: Edgemere
- Coordinates: 40.592928°N 73.775986°W
- Division: B (IND, formerly LIRR Far Rockaway Branch)
- Line: IND Rockaway Line
- Services: A (all times)
- Transit: MTA Bus: Q22
- Structure: Elevated
- Platforms: 2 side platforms
- Tracks: 2

Other information
- Opened: 1922; 104 years ago (LIRR station)
- Rebuilt: June 28, 1956; 70 years ago (as a Subway station)
- Former/other names: Beach 44th Street–Frank Avenue

Traffic
- 2025: 92,973 ▼38.2%
- Rank: 420 out of 423
Services
| Preceding station | New York City Subway | Following station |
|---|---|---|
| Beach 60th Street toward Inwood–207th Street | A (New York City Subway service) | Beach 36th Street toward Far Rockaway–Mott Avenue |
Former services
| Preceding station | Long Island Rail Road | Following station |
|---|---|---|
| Edgemere toward Valley Stream | Far Rockaway Branch | Arverne–Straiton Avenue toward Hammels |
| Edgemere toward Gibson | Rockaway Beach Division | Arverne–Straiton Avenue toward Woodside |
Location
Location within New York City Subway
Location within New York City
Location within New York
Track layout
Street map
Station service legend
| Symbol | Description |
| Stops all times | Stops all times |

The Beach 44th Street station (signed as Beach 44th Street–Frank Avenue) is a station on the IND Rockaway Line of the New York City Subway. It is served by the A train at all times.

== History ==
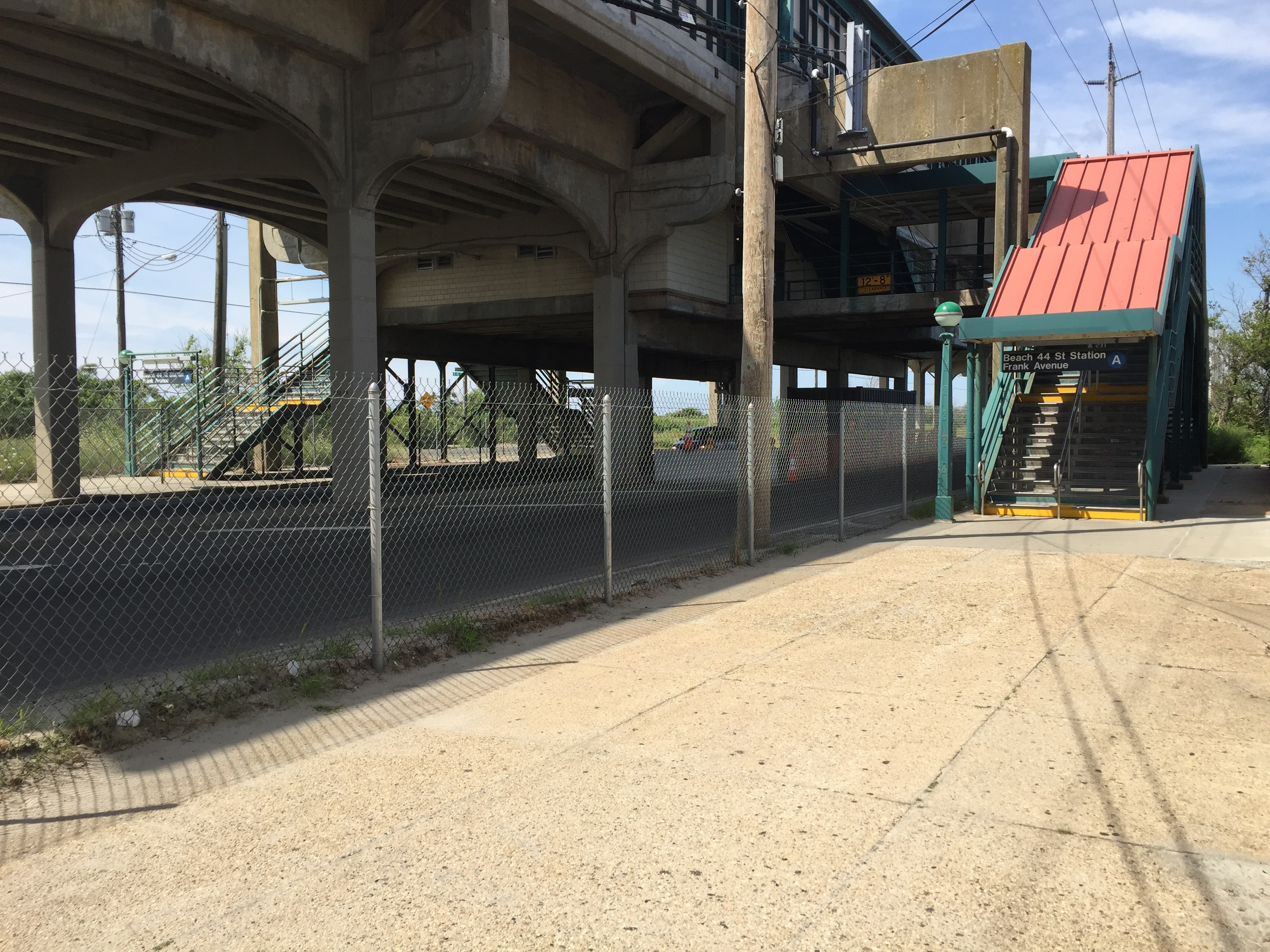
Stairs at Beach 44th Street and Rockaway Freeway

Beach 44th Street–Frank Avenue was originally a trolley stop of the Ocean Electric Railway, which used a former segment of the Long Island Rail Road's Far Rockaway Branch tracks, until it became a Long Island Railroad Station in 1922. The station was relocated 758 feet east of its former location between August 2 and August 23, 1940 as part of a grade crossing elimination project between Beach 44th Street and Beach 47th Street. The new elevated station was opened on April 10, 1942.

The station was purchased by New York City on October 3, 1955, along with the rest of the Rockaway Beach Branch and Far Rockaway Branch west of Far Rockaway, after a fire on the line's crossing over Jamaica Bay in 1950. Now operated by the New York City Transit Authority, it reopened as a subway station along the IND Rockaway Line on June 28, 1956.

== Station layout ==
There are two tracks and two side platforms. The station is served by the A train at all times and is between Beach 60th Street to the east (railroad south) and Beach 36th Street to the west (railroad north).

=== Exits ===
This station has no closed exits, and the full-time fare control is at the middle of the platforms. Four stairs lead to the street, two on each western corner of Rockaway Freeway and Beach 44th Street.
