= Beach 67th Street station =

New York City Subway station in Queens

Beach 67 Street
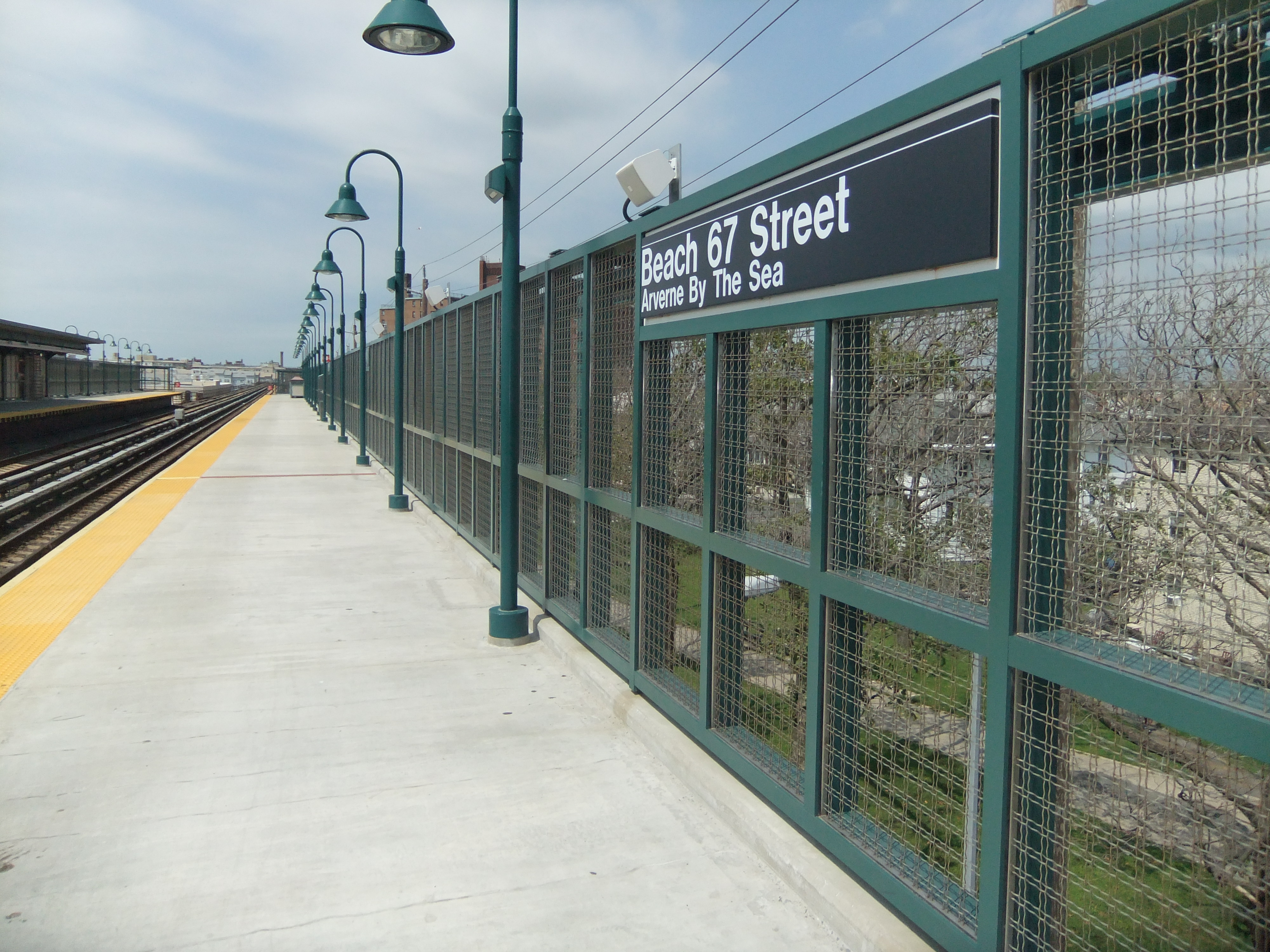
- Northbound platform

Station statistics
- Address: Beach 67th Street & Rockaway Freeway; Queens, New York
- Borough: Queens
- Locale: Arverne
- Coordinates: 40.59092°N 73.79681°W
- Division: B (IND, formerly LIRR Far Rockaway Branch)
- Line: IND Rockaway Line
- Services: A (all times)
- Transit: MTA Bus: Q22, Q52 SBS, QM17
- Structure: Elevated
- Platforms: 2 side platforms
- Tracks: 2

Other information
- Opened: 1888; 138 years ago (LIRR station)
- Rebuilt: June 28, 1956; 70 years ago (as a Subway station)
- Accessible: Yes
- Former/other names: Beach 67th Street–Arverne By The Sea; Beach 67th Street–Gaston

Traffic
- 2025: 334,601 ▼29.2%
- Rank: 409 out of 423
Services
Preceding station	New York City Subway	Following station
Broad Channel toward Inwood–207th Street	A (New York City Subway service)	Beach 60th Street toward Far Rockaway–Mott Avenue
Non-revenue services and lines
Preceding station	New York City Subway	Following station
Beach 90th Street Hammels Wye	no service	
Former services
Preceding station	Long Island Rail Road	Following station
Arverne-Straiton Avenue toward Valley Stream	Far Rockaway Branch	Hammels Terminus
Arverne-Straiton Avenue toward Gibson	Rockaway Beach Division	Beach Channel toward Woodside
Location
Location within New York City Subway
Location within New York City
Location within New York
Track layout
Street map
Station service legend
Symbol	Description
Stops all times	Stops all times

The Beach 67th Street station (signed as Beach 67th Street–Arverne By The Sea) is a station on the IND Rockaway Line of the New York City Subway. Located at Beach 67th Street and Rockaway Freeway in Arverne, Queens, it is served by the A train at all times. The station is adjacent to Kohlreiter Square, a public green space on the north side of the station.

== History ==
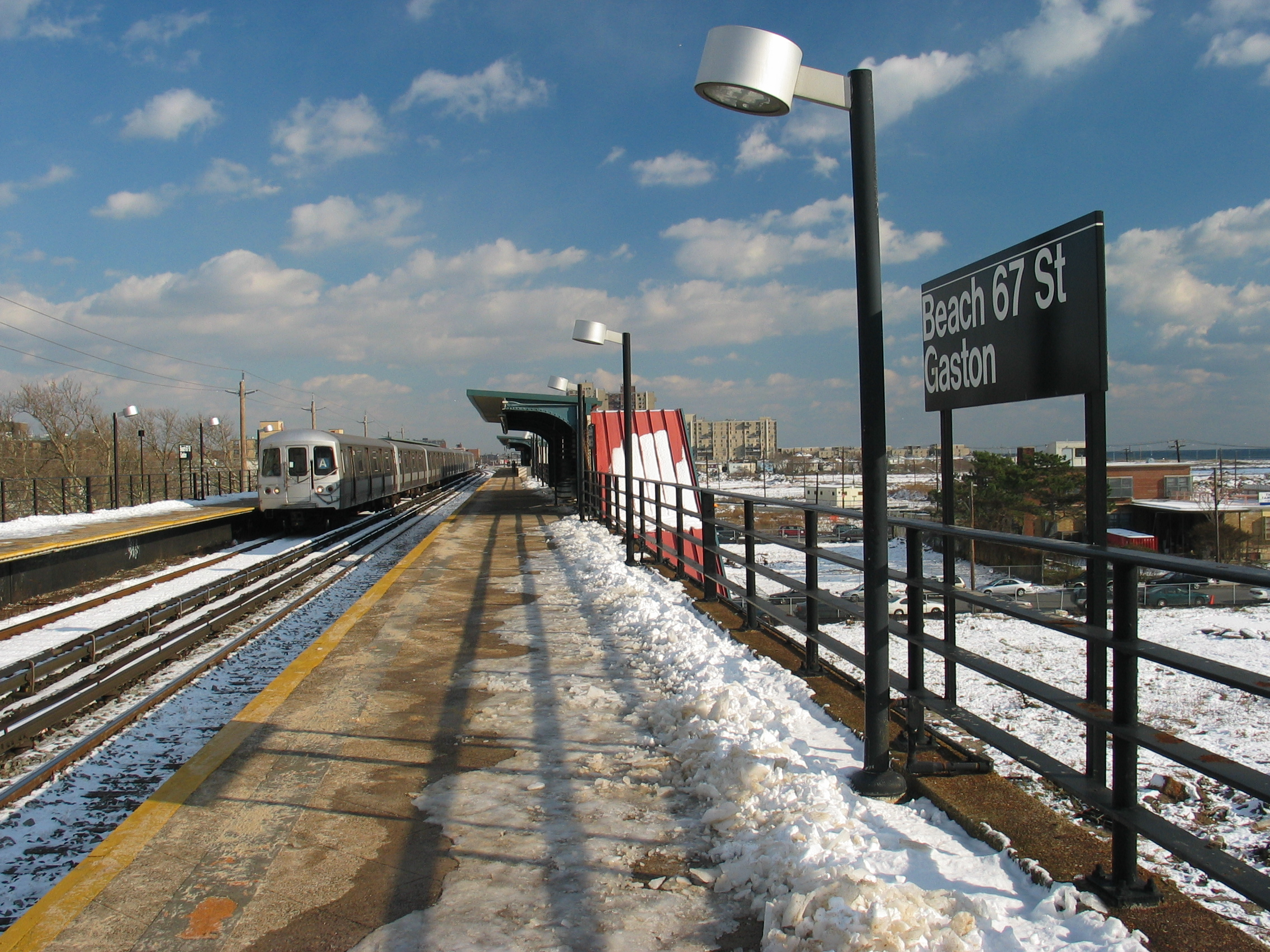
Before renovation

The station was originally built as Arverne for the Long Island Rail Road in 1888 at Gaston Avenue, by New York lawyer and developer Remington Vernam. The station and the development were named by his wife who admired the way he signed his checks. The station had a large tower, was shaped like a Victorian hotel and had a connection to the Ocean Electric Railway.

Due to a quarrel between the LIRR and Vernam, another Arverne station was built at Straiton Avenue in 1892. From then on, it was known as Arverne–Gaston Avenue to distinguish it from the Straiton Avenue station. Arverne station was rebuilt on a new site with a simpler structure in May 1912. The station was rebuilt as an elevated station named Gaston Avenue, which opened on April 10, 1942. The station was purchased by New York City on October 3, 1955, along with the rest of the Rockaway Beach Branch and Far Rockaway Branch west of Far Rockaway, after a fire on the line's crossing over Jamaica Bay in 1950. Now operated by the New York City Transit Authority, it reopened as a subway station along the IND Rockaway Line on June 28, 1956.

In March 2010, Queens Community Board 14, which represents Arverne, voted in favor of renaming the station from Beach 67th Street–Gaston to Beach 67th Street–Arverne By The Sea. New signs with this name were installed in July 2011.

In 2019, the Metropolitan Transportation Authority announced that this station would become ADA-accessible as part of the agency's 2020–2024 Capital Program. A contract for two elevators at the station was awarded in December 2020. The elevators were finished on January 11, 2024, and dedicated on January 19.

== Station layout ==
There are two tracks and two side platforms. The station is served by the A train at all times and is between Beach 60th Street to the east (railroad south) and Broad Channel to the west (railroad north).

Trains that leave the station northbound reach the Hammels Wye, where it is possible to head north to Broad Channel (the usual service pattern) or traverse a short single-track segment onto the southbound Rockaway Park-bound branch of the line. This connection was used for the temporary H shuttle from Far Rockaway to Beach 90th Street following Hurricane Sandy, and was used by the Rockaway Park Shuttle for several months in 2018.

=== Exits ===
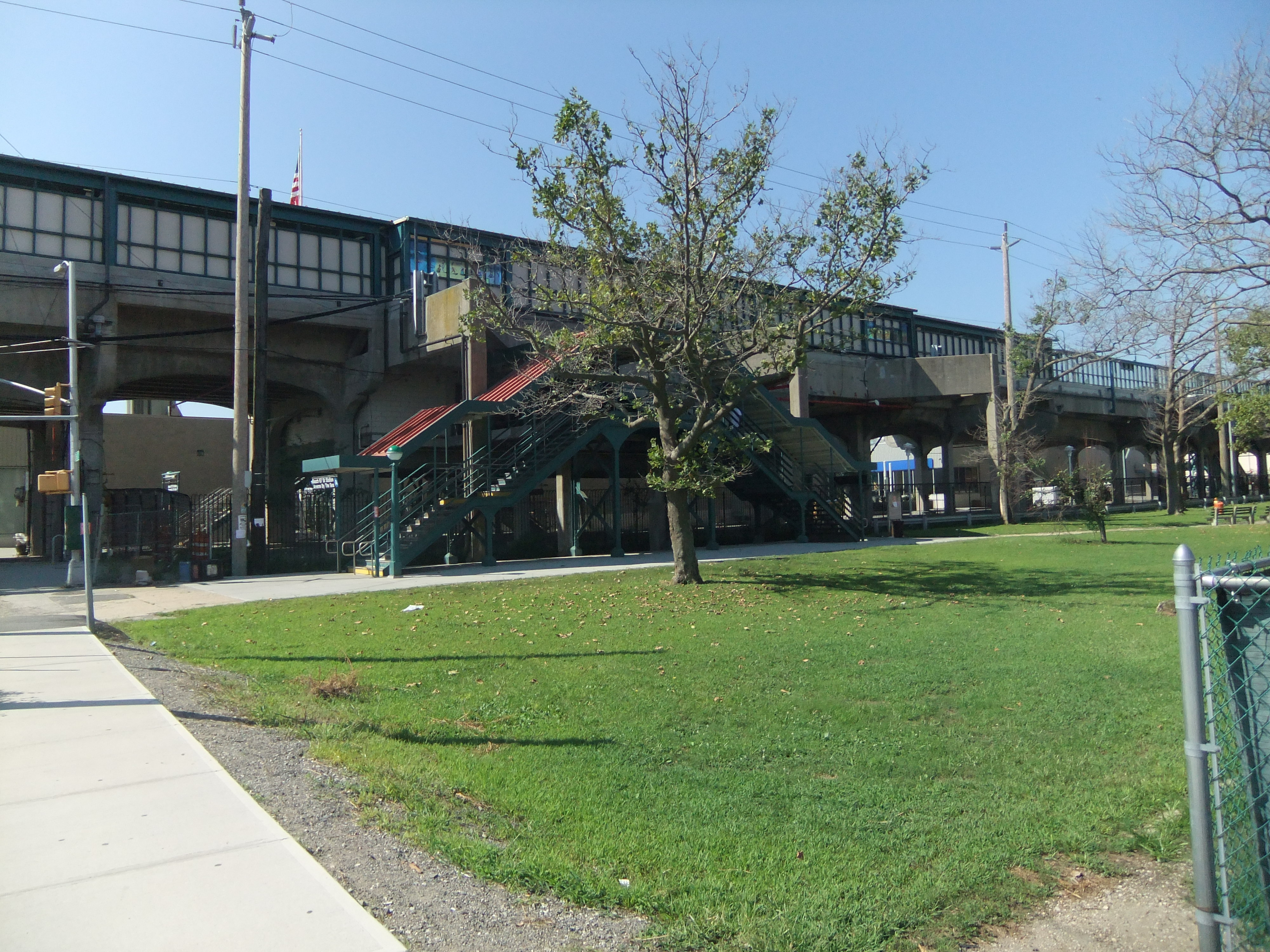
Street stair entrances to mezzanine prior to elevator and street-to-platform staircase installation

The only active station house beneath the platforms and tracks at the east end has four staircases: two to the street (one to each western corner of Beach 67th Street and Rockaway Freeway) and one to each platform. The mezzanine layout gives evidence that there were originally separate turnstiles for entry and exit. The entry turnstiles are all on one side of the booth while the exit turnstiles are on the opposite side. Since the elimination of the double fare, steel gates have replaced the turnstiles.

A second exit is located at the west end of the Far Rockaway-bound platform which leads to the southeast side of Beach 69th Street and Rockaway Freeway. A third exit is located to the west of the main entrance behind the elevator which leads to the Brooklyn-bound platform from the street level.

The station has an elevator that connects to the mezzanine, westbound platform, and street levels, outside of fare control, at northwest corner of Beach 67th Street and Rockaway Freeway. A second elevator inside fare control connects to the mezzanine and eastbound platform levels.
