= Rockaway Branch =

Rockaway Branch may refer to:

- IND Rockaway Line of the New York City Subway, or its branches
  - IND Far Rockaway Branch, terminating at Far Rockaway – Mott Avenue (IND Rockaway Line)
- Rockaway Park Shuttle or IND Rockaway Park Branch
- Far Rockaway Branch of the Long Island Rail Road (former Rockaway Division)
- Former Rockaway Beach Branch of the Long Island Rail Road
