= Beach 25th Street station =

New York City Subway station in Queens

Beach 25 Street
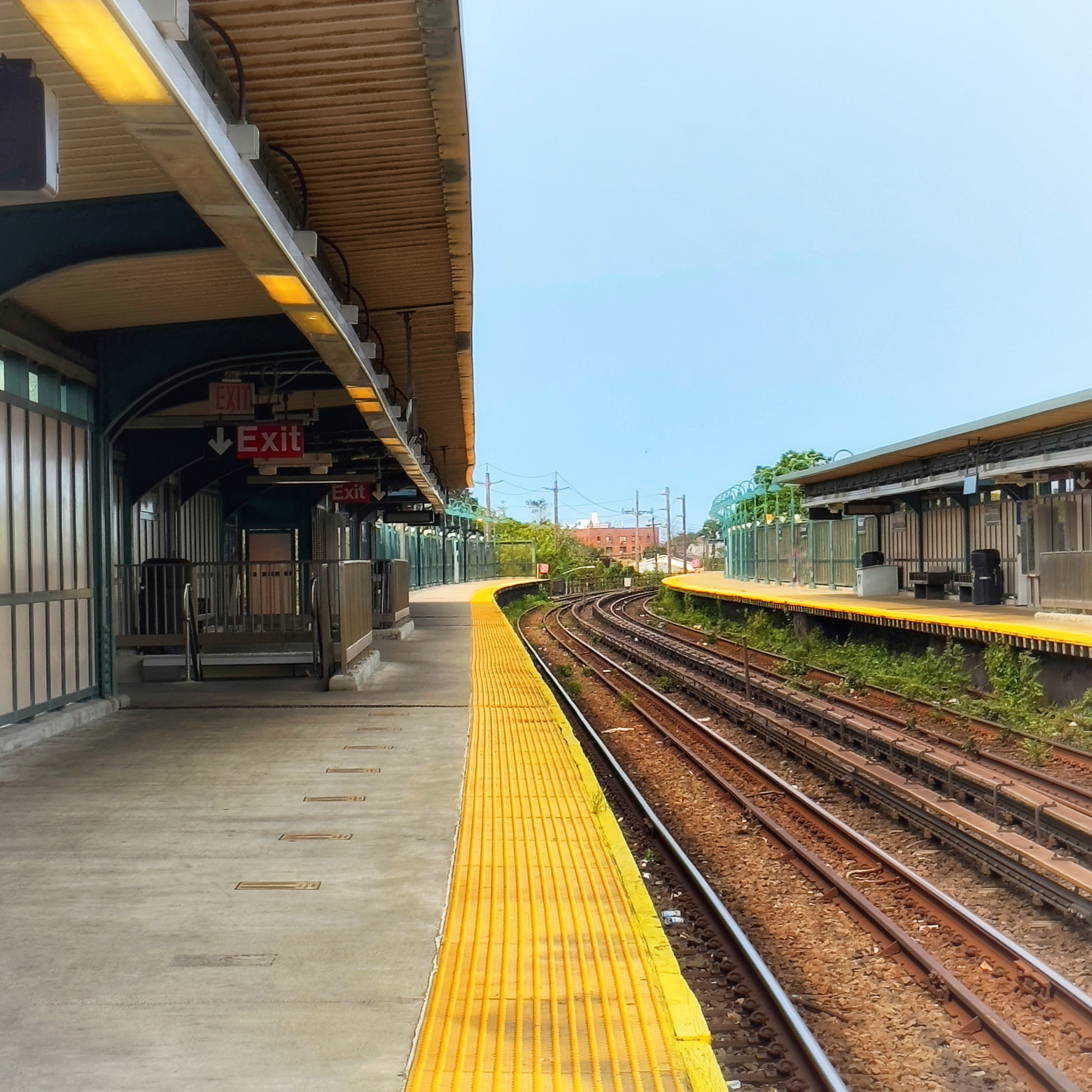
- View of both platforms facing east

Station statistics
- Address: Beach 25th Street & Rockaway Freeway; Queens, New York
- Borough: Queens
- Locale: Far Rockaway
- Coordinates: 40°36′0.22″N 73°45′41.12″W
- Division: B (IND, formerly LIRR Far Rockaway Branch)
- Line: IND Rockaway Line
- Services: A (all times)
- Structure: Elevated
- Platforms: 2 side platforms
- Tracks: 2

Other information
- Opened: May 1928; 98 years ago (LIRR station)
- Rebuilt: June 28, 1956; 70 years ago (as a Subway station)
- Former/other names: Beach 25th Street–Wavecrest

Traffic
- 2025: 193,903 ▼34.7%
- Rank: 413 out of 423
Services
Preceding station	New York City Subway	Following station
Beach 36th Street toward Inwood–207th Street	A (New York City Subway service)	Far Rockaway–Mott Avenue Terminus
Former services
Preceding station	Long Island Rail Road	Following station
Far Rockaway toward Valley Stream	Far Rockaway Branch	Edgemere toward Hammels
Far Rockaway toward Gibson	Rockaway Beach Division	Edgemere toward Woodside
Location
Location within New York City Subway
Location within New York City
Location within New York
Track layout
Street map
Station service legend
Symbol	Description
Stops all times	Stops all times

The Beach 25th Street station (signed as Beach 25th Street–Wavecrest) is a station on the IND Rockaway Line of the New York City Subway, located in Queens on the Rockaway Freeway at Beach 25th Street. It is served by the A train at all times. There are two tracks and two side platforms.

== History ==
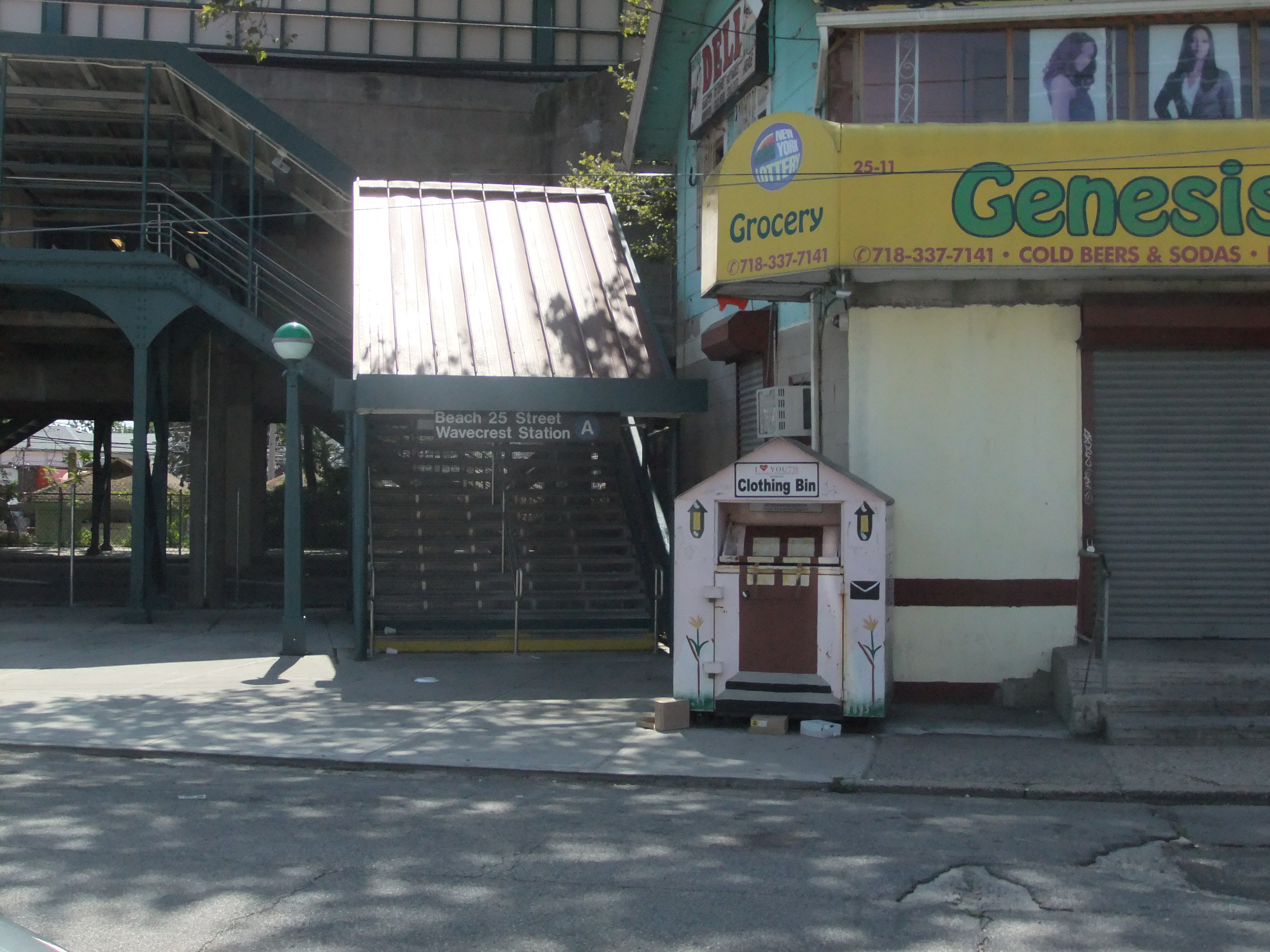
North side stair

The station was originally opened by the Long Island Rail Road in May 1928 as Wavecrest Station.

It was closed and relocated 800 feet (240 m) east of the former location in August 1940 as part of a grade elevation project. The elevated station was opened on April 10, 1942. The station was purchased by New York City on October 3, 1955, along with the rest of the Rockaway Beach Branch and Far Rockaway Branch west of Far Rockaway, after a fire on the line's crossing over Jamaica Bay in 1950. Now operated by the New York City Transit Authority, it reopened as a subway station along the IND Rockaway Line on June 28, 1956. This station was the terminal for the Far Rockaway branch until the opening of Far Rockaway–Mott Avenue station on January 16, 1958.

== Station layout ==
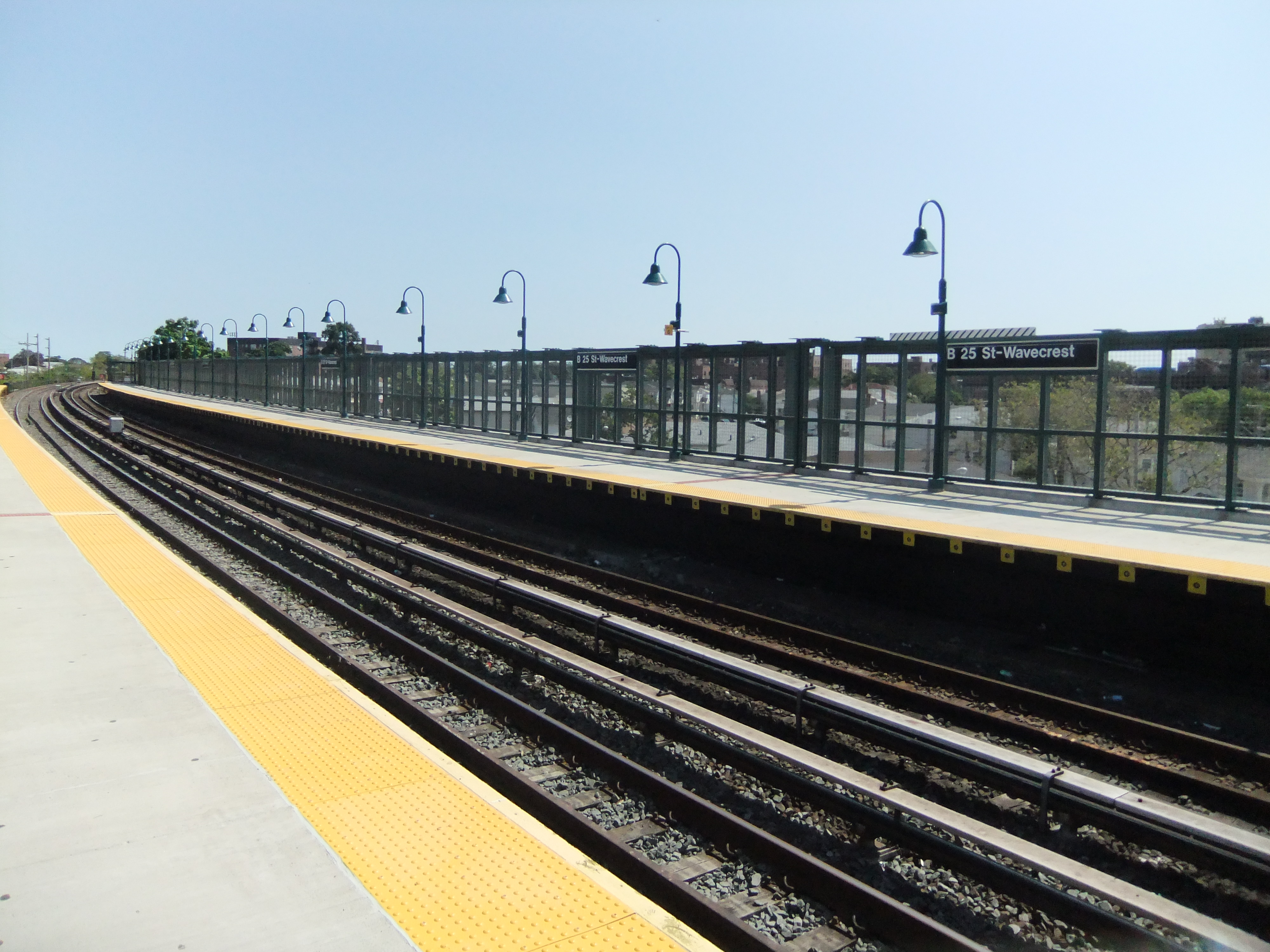
North side of the Mott Avenue bound platform

This station is on a concrete viaduct with ballasted track. It has two tracks and two side platforms. The station is served by the A train at all times and is between Far Rockaway–Mott Avenue to the east (railroad south) and Beach 36th Street to the west (railroad north).

=== Exits ===
Exit is near the center to the tiled mezzanine. The mezzanine is four stories high. Three stairs lead to the street, two to the southwestern corner and one to the northwestern corner of Rockaway Freeway and Beach 25th Street.
