= Beach Channel station =

Train station in New York City (1888–1905)

Beach Channel

General information
- Location: North end of the Beach Channel Drawbridge; Broad Channel, Queens, New York City
- Coordinates: 40°35′54″N 73°48′42″W
- Line: Rockaway Beach Branch
- Platforms: 2 side platforms
- Tracks: 2

History
- Opened: 1888
- Closed: 1905

Former services
Preceding station	Long Island Rail Road	Following station
Broad Channel toward Glendale	Rockaway Beach Division	Arverne toward Gibson
Broad Channel toward Glendale	Rockaway Beach Division	Hammels toward Rockaway Park
Location

Beach Channel was a Long Island Rail Road station on the Rockaway Beach Branch in Broad Channel, Queens, New York. It was located on the north end of the Beach Channel Drawbridge across from the north leg of the Hammels Wye.

== History ==
Beach Channel station was originally built in the spring of 1888 by the New York and Rockaway Beach Railway, a year after the bankruptcy of the New York, Woodhaven and Rockaway Railroad. Originating at the vicinity of Signal Station #101 (later the "HJ" Tower), the site was leased by a former congressman from Freeport, New York, named Thomas A. Smith. Originally serving as dropping off point for fishermen, it was expanded into a restaurant, with a bait & tackle shop, a boat rental dealership, and two hotels on both side of the tracks.

On June 13, 1903, the hotel on the east side of the tracks was destroyed by a 3:00 A.M. fire, taking the northbound platforms and part of the trestle with it. The hotel on the southbound platforms and an adjacent club house were unaffected by the fire, but both structures were moved to the mainland in response to the disaster in 1904, the same year NY&RB ceased as an independent railroad and became part of the LIRR. This would be the first of three major fires that would disrupt service on both the Rockaway Beach and Far Rockaway Branches. The next major fire took place at Howard's Landing station in 1907, and the third major fire would occur at The Raunt station in 1950. The LIRR sought permission from the New York Public Service Commission to abandon Beach Channel station, and finally received that permission on May 31, 1905.
