= Frederick Lancaster =

Frederick Lancaster may refer to:

- Frederick J. Lancaster, land developer in New York
- Frederick Wilfrid Lancaster (1933–2013), British-American information scientist
