= Edgemere =

Edgemere may refer to a community in the United States:

- Edgemere, Maryland, an unincorporated community and census-designated place in Baltimore County, Maryland
- Edgemere, Queens, a neighborhood in the New York City borough of Queens
- Edgemere (Grosse Pointe Farms, Michigan), a Gilded Age mansion in Michigan
