= Far Rockaway station (LIRR) =

Long Island Rail Road station in Queens, New York

Far Rockaway
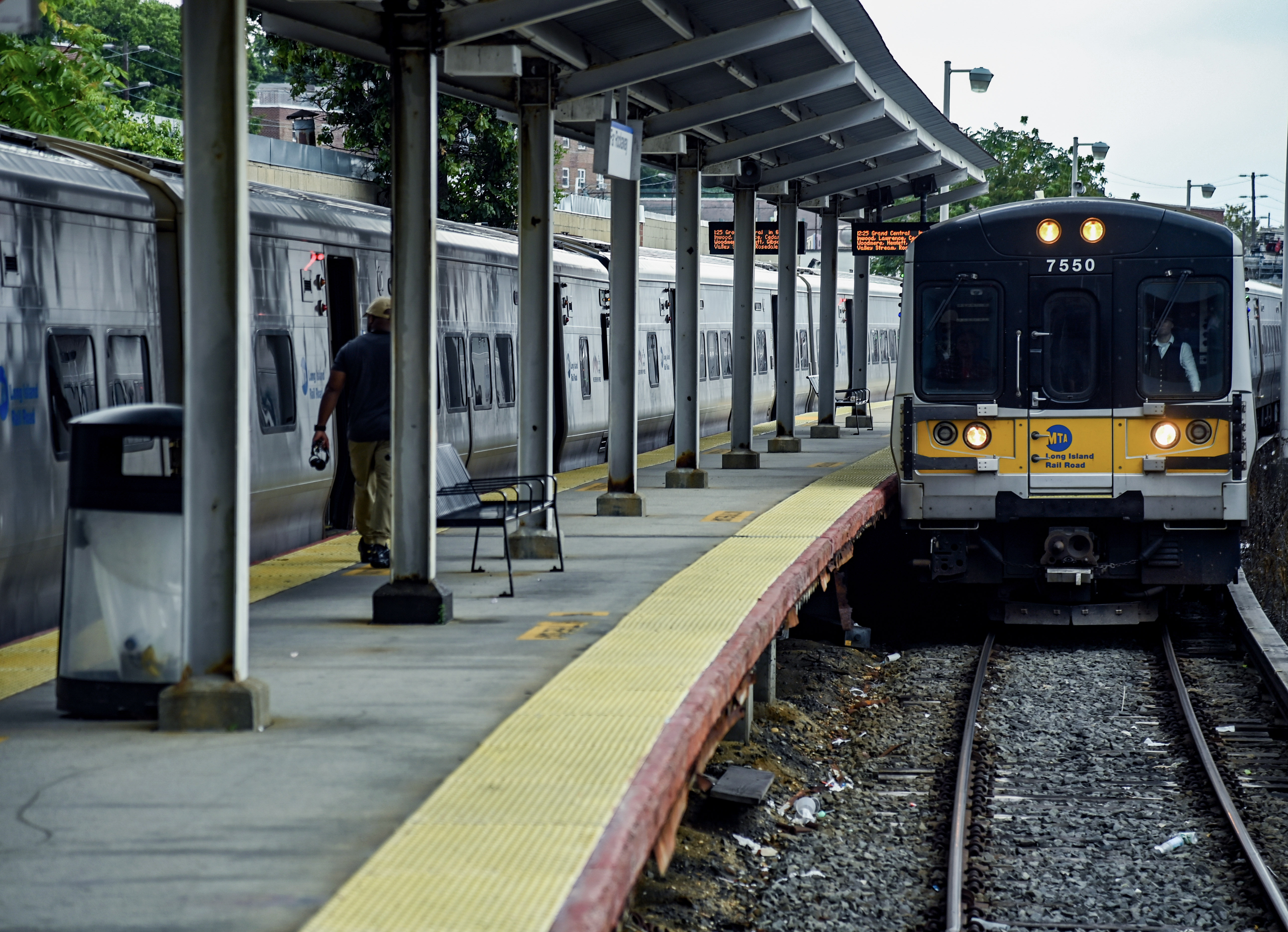
- Two M7 trains at the Far Rockaway station in 2023

General information
- Location: Nameoke Avenue and Redfern Avenue; Far Rockaway, Queens, New York
- Coordinates: 40.608610°N 73.750792°W
- Owner: Long Island Rail Road
- Line: Far Rockaway Branch
- Platforms: 1 island platform
- Tracks: 2
- Connections: New York City Subway at Far Rockaway – Mott Avenue; MTA Bus: Q22, Q113, Q114; Nassau Inter-County Express: n31, n31x, n32, n33

Construction
- Parking: Yes
- Accessible: Yes

Other information
- Station code: FRY
- Fare zone: 4

History
- Opened: February 21, 1958 (current station); July 29, 1869 (original station)

Passengers
- 2012—2014: 560 per weekday

Services
Preceding station	Long Island Rail Road	Following station
Inwood toward Penn Station or Grand Central	Far Rockaway Branch	Terminus
Location

The Far Rockaway station is the terminus of the Long Island Rail Road's Far Rockaway Branch in the Far Rockaway neighborhood of Queens in New York City. The station is located at Nameoke Avenue (formerly Nameoke Street) and Redfern Avenue.

== History ==
The original Far Rockaway station was built by the South Side Railroad of Long Island on July 29, 1869. From 1872 to 1877, the station was located in close proximity to the southern terminus of the LIRR's Cedarhurst Cut-off. The original station house was converted into a freight house and was replaced by the second station, which was moved from the Ocean Point (Cedarhurst) station, remodeled, and opened on October 1, 1881. The third depot opened on July 15, 1890, while the second depot was sold and moved to a private location in October 1890. From 1897 to 1926, the Ocean Electric Railway used the Far Rockaway station as both its eastern terminus and as its headquarters. It additionally served as the terminus of a Long Island Electric Railway trolley line leading to Jamaica. The tracks and platforms were elevated as with much of the Far Rockaway Branch on April 10, 1942.

The Far Rockaway Branch had originally been part of a loop that traveled along the existing route, continuing through the Rockaway Peninsula and heading on a trestle across Jamaica Bay through Queens where it reconnected with the Atlantic and Lower Montauk branches, and even the Main Line. Frequent fires and maintenance problems led to the LIRR abandoning the Queens portion of the route (with the exception being this station), which was acquired by the city to become the IND Rockaway Line, with service provided by the A train. The line was divided with the portions west of Mott Avenue becoming part of the subway system on January 16, 1958, and the current Far Rockaway station becoming not only the terminus of the LIRR branch on February 21, 1958, but also the newest station on the branch.

Although the station is located within New York City, it was not initially part of LIRR's CityTicket program – which provides discounted tickets for LIRR and Metro-North Railroad trips entirely within the city – because of how the line passes through Nassau County. Residents and politicians had asked the MTA to include the station in the program. The MTA previously stated that they are concerned about customers from other stations along the line in Nassau boarding trains at the reduced CityTicket rate.

The MTA announced in May 2023 as part of wider fare changes, that a discounted ticket option would be introduced which would provide the same discounts as a regular CityTicket. In August 2023, the special fare was unveiled and implemented as the Far Rockaway Ticket. Geolocation restrictions in the TrainTime app only allow purchase of discounted tickets within the vicinity of the Far Rockaway station. Paper tickets are also available from vending machines at the station.

== Station layout ==
This station has one 10-car-long island platform. North of the station, the two tracks merge, then split into four tracks––two of which are used for storage and two continue on towards Jamaica. The station house dating to 1958 was demolished in 2020.

== See also ==
- List of Long Island Rail Road stations
- East Rockaway station
