= Frederick J. Lancaster =

American businessman

Frederick J. Lancaster was a land developer who in the 1890s, with a group of investors, founded the community of Edgemere, on the Rockaway Peninsula in Queens County. Originally the investors planned to call the community "New Venice" and develop it with canals and gondoliers. Although this venture failed, in 1894 Lancaster formed the Lancaster Sea Beach Improvement Company to build a more conventional seaside colony named "Edgemere". Lancaster built a large, luxurious hotel, the Edgemere, which opened in 1895 and became the major summer attraction in the community.

Lancaster also later developed the community of Belle Harbor, further west along the peninsula.

Edgemere, along with nearly all of the peninsula, was incorporated into New York City in 1898.
