= Far Rockaway Branch =

Long Island Rail Road branch

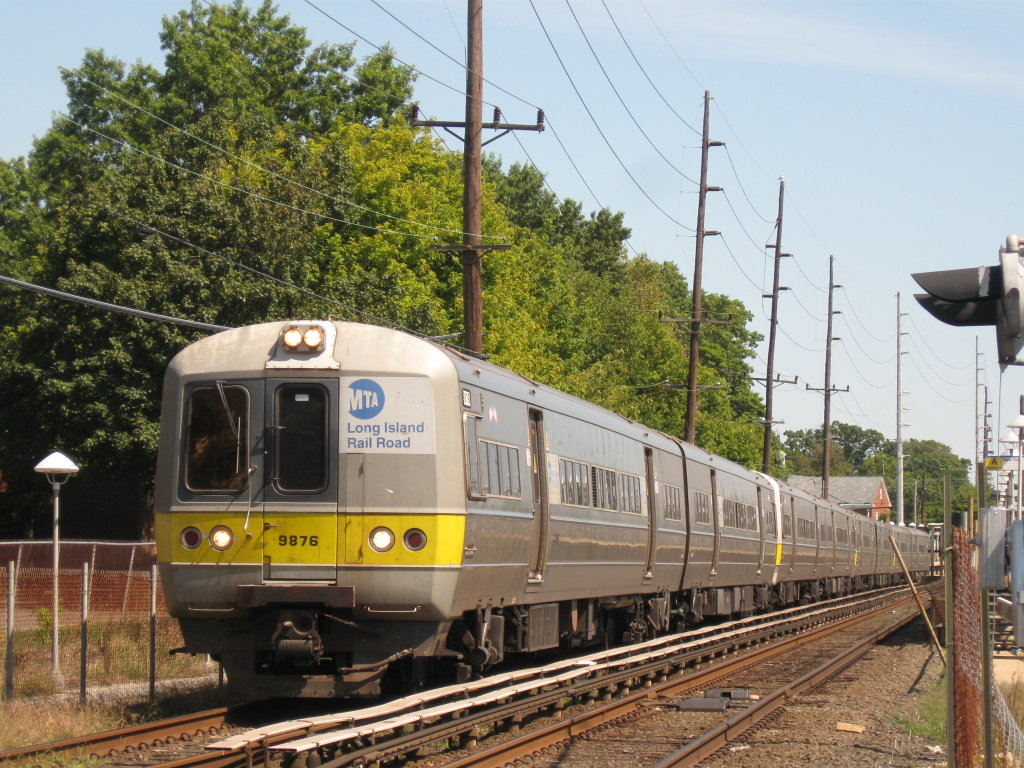
- Far Rockaway Branch train 2820 departing Cedarhurst Station.

Overview
- Status: Operational
- Owner: Long Island Rail Road
- Locale: Queens and Nassau County, New York, US
- Termini: Valley Stream; Far Rockaway
- Stations: 11

Service
- Type: Commuter rail
- System: Long Island Rail Road
- Services: Far Rockaway Branch
- Operator: Metropolitan Transportation Authority
- Ridership: 6,193,431 (annual ridership, 2025)

History
- Opened: 1869 (as part of South Side Railroad of Long Island)

Technical
- Number of tracks: 2
- Track gauge: 4 ft 8 1/2 in (1,435 mm)
- Electrification: Third rail, 750 V DC
Route map
- Distances shown from Long Island City via the Lower Montauk Branch

The Far Rockaway Branch is an electrified rail line and service owned and operated by the Long Island Rail Road in the U.S. state of New York. The branch begins at Valley Interlocking, just east of Valley Stream station. From Valley Stream, the line heads south and southwest through southwestern Nassau County, ending at Far Rockaway in Queens, thus reentering New York City. LIRR maps and schedules indicate that the Far Rockaway Branch service continues west along the Atlantic Branch to Jamaica, from where it can reach either Grand Central Madison or Penn Station, both in Midtown Manhattan.

== History ==
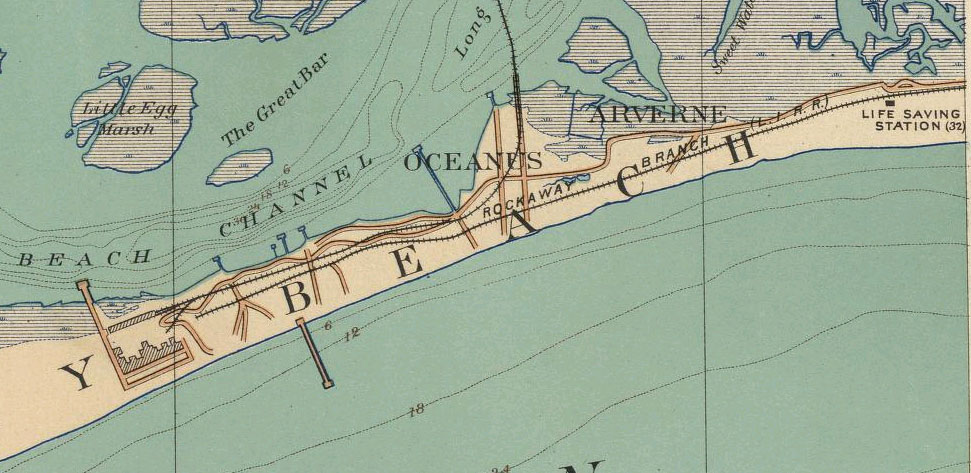
The Far Rockaway Branch initially extended west to Rockaway Park. In 1887, a connection was built to the Rockaway Beach Branch at Hammels, and the older Far Rockaway Branch was abandoned west of Hammels.

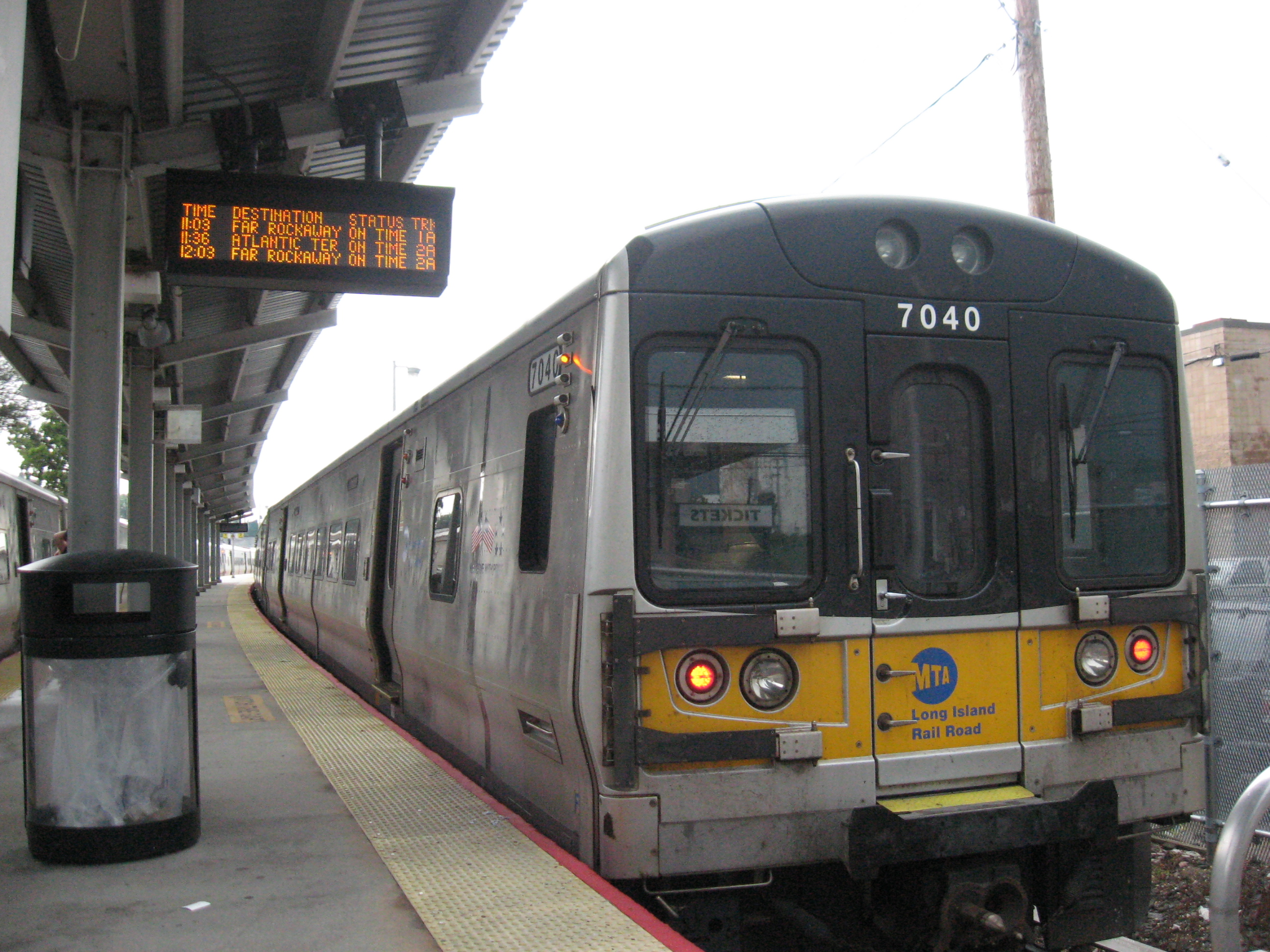
LIRR train at the existing terminus in Far Rockaway.

=== Opening ===
The South Side Railroad (SSRLI) built the branch in 1869 under a subsidiary called the Far Rockaway Branch Railroad. While constructing it in summer 1869, the company installed about 700 feet (200 m) of tracks across William B. McManus's farmland near Lawrence. However, the transaction had not been completed, and McManus and some friends tore up the track the next night; after a legal battle, the company paid McManus. The same year, the South Side established a subsidiary named the Hempstead and Rockaway Railroad (H&R) designed to connect the line to the up-and-coming Southern Hempstead Branch. The H&R was dissolved in 1871.

=== Expansion ===
Due to the success of the branch, the South Side built the 200-foot (60 m) South Side Pavilion, a restaurant on the beach at what is today Beach 30th Street. With an additional subsidiary known as the Rockaway Railway (1871-1872; Not to be confused with the Rockaway Village Railroad), the line was extended west to the Seaside House (Beach 103rd Street) in 1872 and Neptune House (Beach 116th Street) in 1875. The Far Rockaway Branch, along with the rest of the South Side Railroad, was acquired by the Long Island Rail Road in 1876.

Two stations on the branch were built as Arverne, both of which were built by Remington Vernam. The first of which was in 1888 at Gaston Avenue (Beach 67th Street). It had a large tower, was shaped like a Victorian hotel and had a connection to the Ocean Electric Railway, as did much of the Rockaway Beach and Far Rockaway branches. Due to a quarrel between the LIRR and Vernam, another Arverne Station was built at Straiton Avenue in 1892. From then on, the original Arverne station was known as Arverne-Gaston Avenue to distinguish it from the Arverne-Straiton Avenue.

In 1908, the line between Cedarhurst and Far Rockaway was triple-tracked. During the early 1940s, the right-of-way was relocated from a ground-level routing to a concrete trestle. The ROW crossed Mott Avenue in Far Rockaway and returned to ground level, passing over Nameoke Street, continuing to Gibson Station and ascending back on a trestle to Valley Stream.

=== End of Jamaica Bay service ===
Until 1950 trains from Penn Station could leave the Main Line at Whitepot Junction (40.7254°N 73.8608°W) and head south past the Atlantic Branch connection at Woodhaven Junction (40.6871°N 73.8433°W) to the Hammels Wye at 40.5913°N 73.8088°W, turning right there to Rockaway Park or left to Valley Stream and Jamaica and maybe on to Penn Station. Frequent fires and maintenance problems, notably a May 23, 1950 fire between Broad Channel and The Raunt, led the LIRR to abandon the Queens portion of the route on October 3, 1955, which was acquired by the city to become the IND Rockaway Line, with service provided by the A train. Most Queens stations along the former Far Rockaway and Rockaway Beach Branches reopened as subway stations on June 28, 1956, the exception being Far Rockaway–Mott Avenue station, which was split between the NYCTA and LIRR on January 16, 1958.

=== Recent changes ===
Between the late 1960s and 1990s, various stations along the Far Rockaway Branch were given high-level platforms in order to accommodate modern M1, M3, and M7 railcars.

The Far Rockaway Branch has the distinction of containing the oldest surviving railroad station on Long Island, and the only existing building constructed by an LIRR predecessor, specifically Hewlett. In 2003, the LIRR closed that station replacing it with a new one diagonally across the railroad crossing on Franklin Avenue; however, the original SSRLI Depot has remained intact.

== Stations ==
West of Locust Manor, most trips go on to terminate at Grand Central or Penn Station, while some late night trains terminate at Jamaica. Stations past Far Rockaway were abandoned in 1955, though many of them were reopened as subway stations on the IND Rockaway Line in 1956. The location of the former Atlantic Park station is uncertain.

Zone	Location	Station	Miles (km) from Long Island City via the Lower Montauk Branch	Date opened	Date closed	Connections and notes
3	Locust Manor, Queens	Locust Manor	12.2 (19.6)	1869		New York City Bus: Q3, Q85, Q89, QM21; Long Island Rail Road: ■ Long Beach Branch
3	Springfield Gardens, Queens	Higbie Avenue		1908	1960	
3	Laurelton, Queens	Laurelton	13.1 (21.1)	1907		New York City Bus: Q77, Q85, Q89; Long Island Rail Road: ■ Long Beach Branch
3	Rosedale, Queens	Rosedale	14.0 (22.5)	1870		New York City Bus: Q5, Q85, Q86, Q89, QM63; Long Island Rail Road: ■ Long Beach Branch
4	Valley Stream	Valley Stream	16.1 (25.9)	1869		Long Island Rail Road: ■ Long Beach Branch; Nassau Inter-County Express: n1, Elmont Flexi
Zone	Location	Station	Miles (km) from Valley Junction	Date opened	Date closed	Connections and notes
4	Valley Stream	Gibson	0.8 (1.3)	1928		Nassau Inter-County Express: n1
4	Hewlett	Hewlett	1.7 (2.7)	1869		Nassau Inter-County Express: n1, n31, n32 Originally named Cedar Grove, then Hewletts
4	Woodmere	Woodmere	2.3 (3.7)	1869		Nassau Inter-County Express: n31, n31x, n32
4	Cedarhurst	Cedarhurst	3.2 (5.1)	1869		Nassau Inter-County Express: n31, n31x, n32
4	Lawrence	Lawrence	4.0 (6.4)	1869		Nassau Inter-County Express: n31, n31x, n32
4	Inwood	Inwood	4.4 (7.1)	1905		Nassau Inter-County Express: n31, n31x, n32 Originally named Westville
4	Far Rockaway, Queens	Far Rockaway (Nameoke Street)	5.0 (8.0)	1958		New York City Subway: (at Far Rockaway–Mott Avenue); Nassau Inter-County Express: n31, n31x, n32, n33 MTA Bus: Q22, Q113, Q114, QM17
	Far Rockaway, Queens	Far Rockaway–Mott Avenue		1869	1958	Now Far Rockaway–Mott Avenue subway station
	Far Rockaway, Queens	Wavecrest		1928	1955	Now Beach 25th Street subway station
	Far Rockaway, Queens	Atlantic Park		1875		No remains left
	Edgemere, Queens	Edgemere		1895	1955	Now Beach 36th Street subway station
	Edgemere, Queens	Frank Avenue		1922	1955	Now Beach 44th Street subway station
	Arverne, Queens	Arverne–Straiton Avenue		1892	1955	Now Beach 60th Street subway station
	Arverne, Queens	Arverne–Gaston Avenue		1888	1955	Originally named Arverne, now Beach 67th Street subway station
	Rockaway Beach, Queens	Hammels		1880	1941	Replaced the Eldert's Grove station (1872-1887)
	Rockaway Beach, Queens	Holland		1880	1955	Now Beach 90th Street subway station
	Rockaway Beach, Queens	Playland		1903	1955	Now Beach 98th Street subway station
	Rockaway Beach, Queens	Seaside		1880	1955	Now Beach 105th Street subway station
	Rockaway Park, Queens	Rockaway Park		1882	1955	Originally named Rockaway Beach, now Rockaway Park–Beach 116th Street subway station
