= Edgemere, Queens =

Neighborhood in New York City

Edgemere
- Neighborhood of Queens
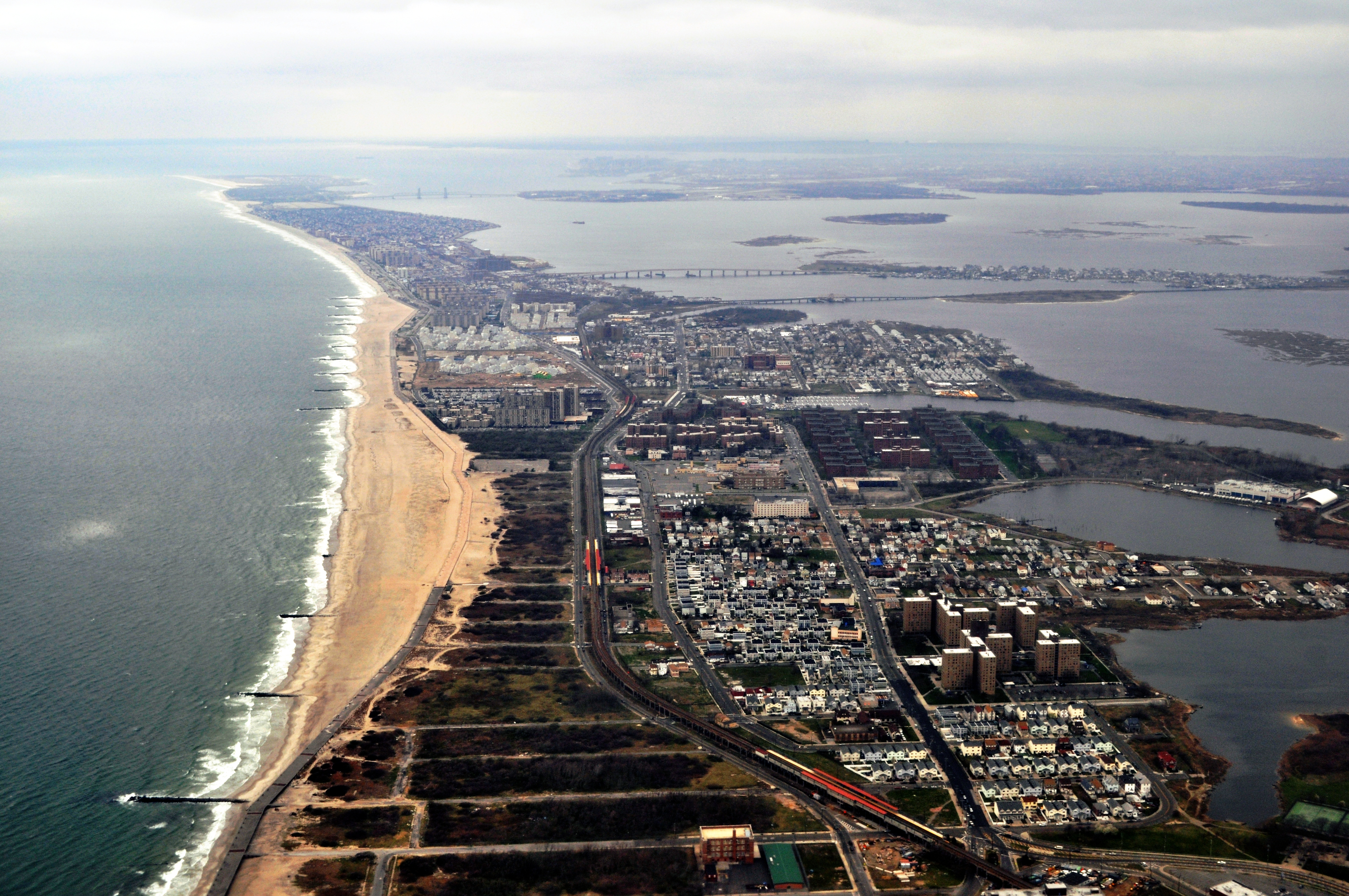
- Aerial view of Edgemere, looking west.
- Interactive map of Edgemere
- Coordinates: 40.595°N 73.775°W
- Country: United States
- State: New York
- City: New York City
- County/Borough: Queens
- Community District: Queens 14
- Named for: "Edge of the sea"

Population (2019)
  - Total: 18,100

Race and Ethnicity
  - Non-Hispanic White: 7%
  - Black or African-American: 56%
  - Hispanic or Latino of any race: 32%
  - Asian: 2%
  - other: 3%

Economics
  - Median income: $32,785
- Time zone: UTC−5 (EST)
  - Summer (DST): UTC−4 (EDT)
- ZIP Code: 11691
- Area codes: 718, 347, 929, and 917

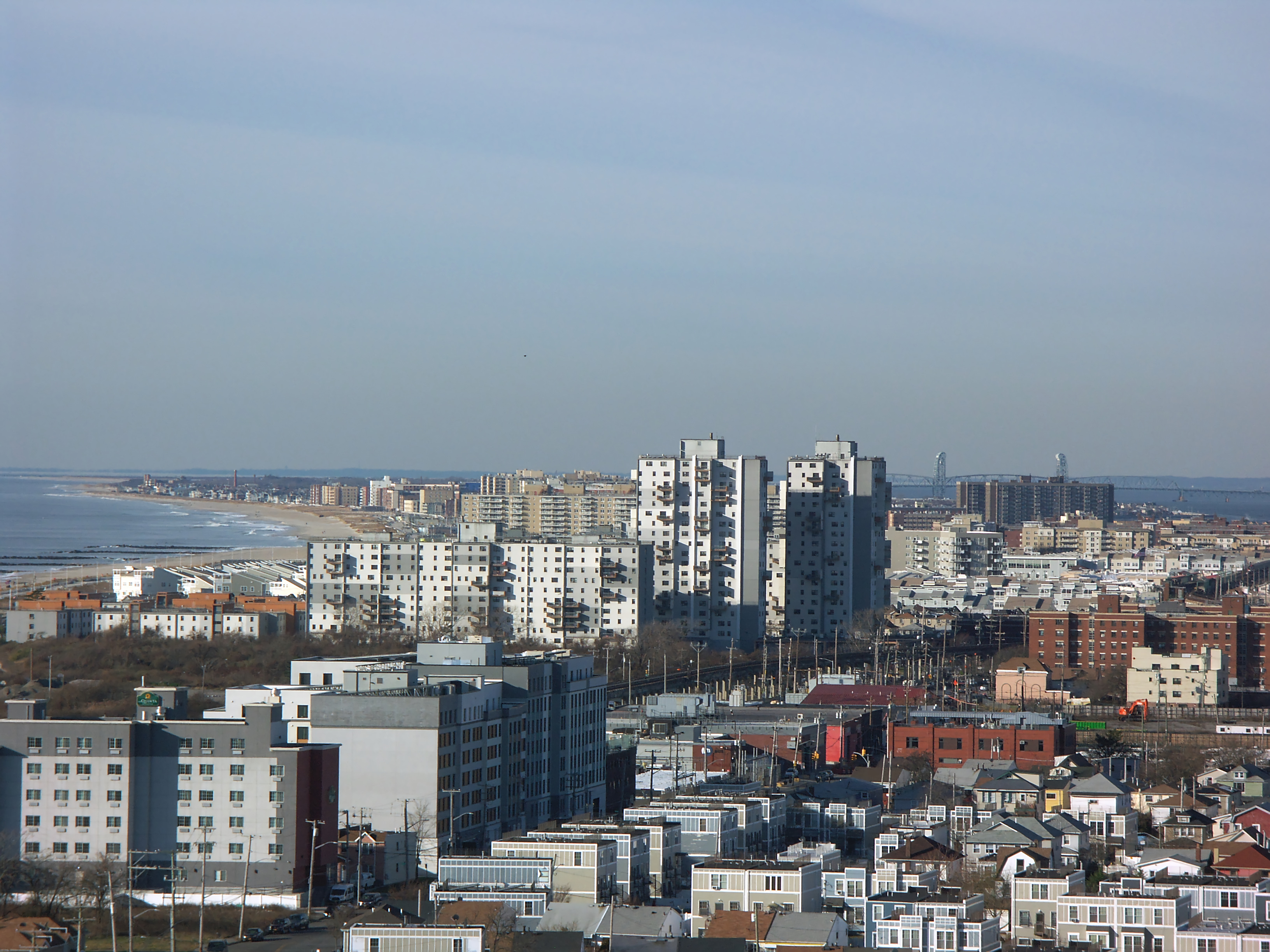
Edgemere, looking towards Arverne View/Ocean Village

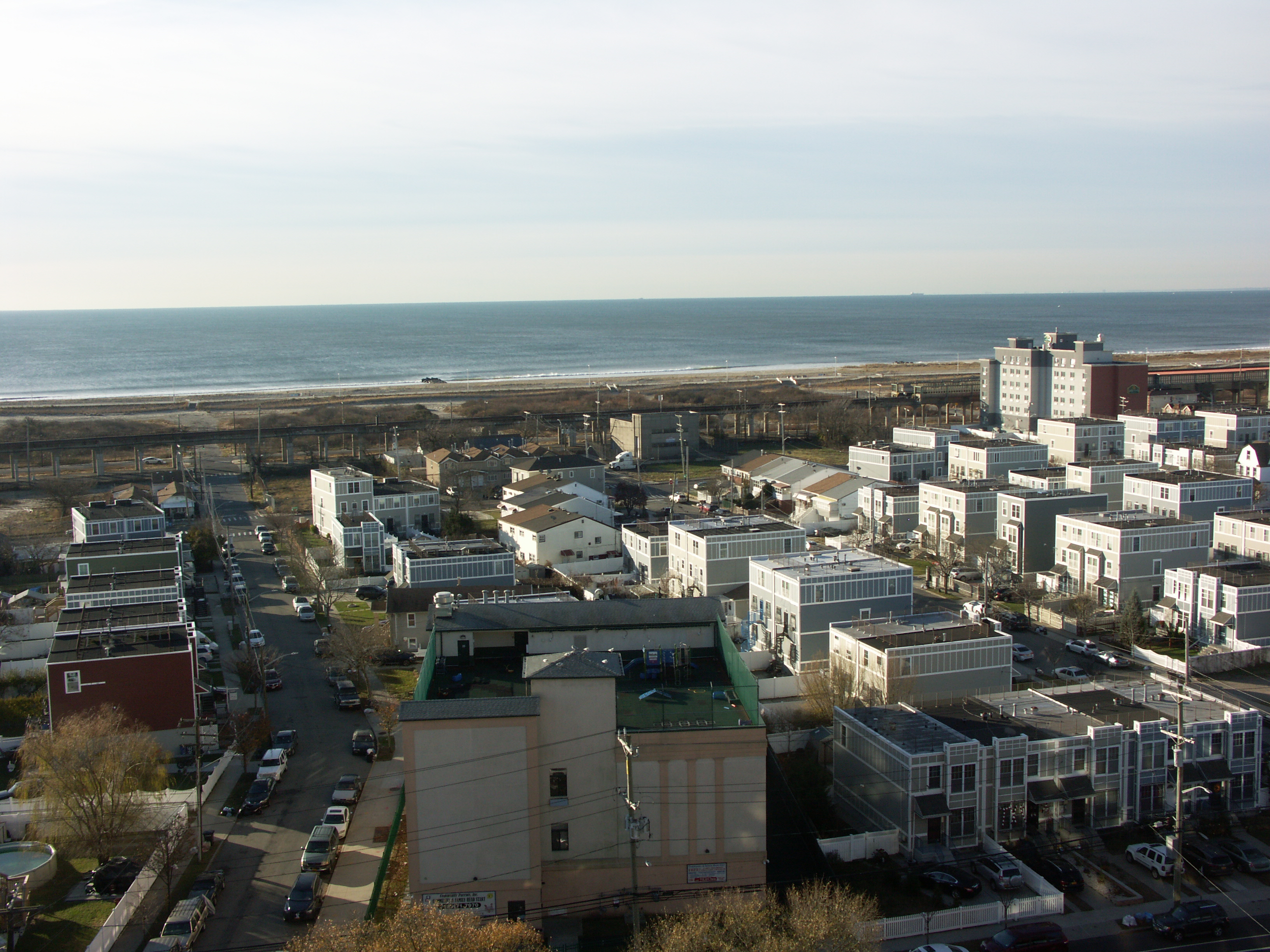
Edgemere, Queens

Edgemere is a neighborhood in the New York City borough of Queens, extending from Beach 32nd to Beach 52nd Street on the Rockaway Peninsula. It contains Rockaway Community Park. Arverne is to the west, and Far Rockaway to the east.

Edgemere was founded in 1892 by Frederick J. Lancaster, who originally called it New Venice. The area is referred to as "Edgemer" in the official New York State Gazetteer, maintained and published by the New York State Department of Health, which includes numerous defunct hamlets and towns, some with alternate or archaic spellings.

Edgemere is located in Queens Community District 14 and its ZIP Code is 11691. It is patrolled by the New York City Police Department's 101st Precinct.

Much like neighboring Arverne, Edgemere was developed as a beachfront tourist district with easy access to Brooklyn and Manhattan by railway. After World War II, the late 19th and early 20th century resorts and cheap bungalows that lined the boardwalk were considered outdated and undesirable by city officials. East of Beach 32nd Street, the original pattern of development can still be seen: rows of very small, single-story bungalows packed close together on narrow streets. As part of an urban renewal project, nearly all structures south of Rockaway Freeway, from Beach 32nd Street to Beach 90th Street, were acquired and demolished by 1970. Despite many ambitious plans for proposed development, no construction occurred until after 1984 and the coastline of Edgemere and Arverne remained lined with hundreds of acres of vacant wasteland for decades. Arverne has since been redeveloped, but the coastal section of Edgemere remains entirely undeveloped. In April 2024, the vacant land became the 35-acre (14 ha) Arverne East Nature Preserve, a public park. In addition, as part of the Arverne East development, a welcome building for the nature preserve was built.

== Transportation ==
The New York City Subway's Beach 44th Street and Beach 36th Street stations, served by the A train, are located in Edgemere. The Q22, Q52 SBS and QM17 MTA Bus routes also serve the neighborhood.

John F. Kennedy International Airport is a short distance away, and the neighborhood lies adjacent to one of the airport's main approach/departure paths.
