= Gibson station =

Long Island Rail Road station in Nassau County, New York

Gibson
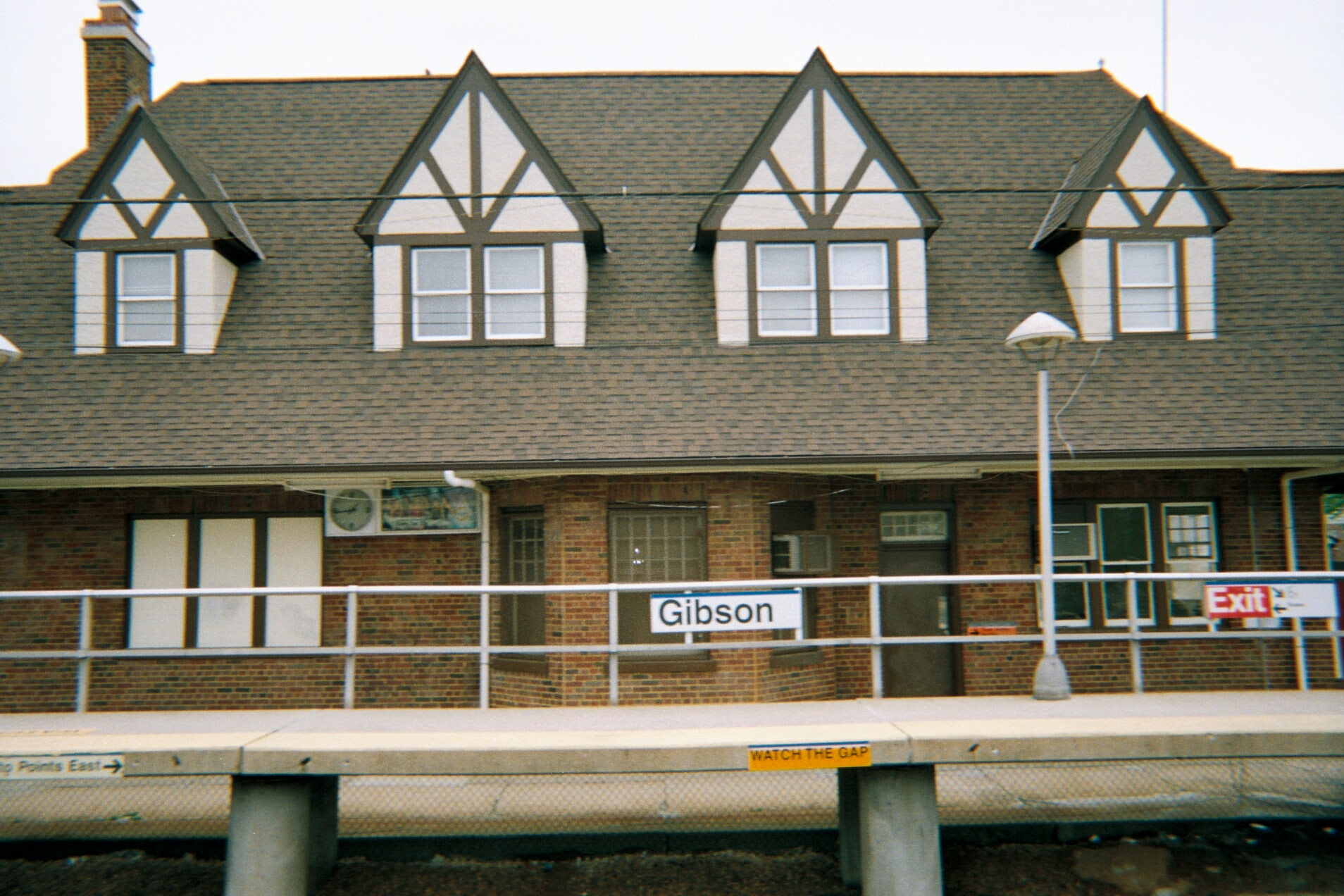
- Gibson's station house and northbound platform

General information
- Location: Gibson Boulevard & Munro Boulevard; Valley Stream, New York
- Coordinates: 40.649927°N 73.701694°W
- Owner: Long Island Rail Road
- Line: Far Rockaway Branch
- Platforms: 2 side platforms
- Tracks: 2
- Connections: Nassau Inter-County Express: n1

Construction
- Parking: Yes
- Accessible: Yes

Other information
- Station code: GBN
- Fare zone: 4

History
- Opened: May 1928
- Electrified: 750 V (DC) third rail

Passengers
- 2012—2014: 1,146 per weekday

Services
Preceding station	Long Island Rail Road	Following station
Valley Stream toward Penn Station or Grand Central	Far Rockaway Branch	Hewlett toward Far Rockaway
Former services
Preceding station	Long Island Rail Road	Following station
Valley Stream Terminus	Far Rockaway Branch	Hewlett toward Hammels
Terminus	Rockaway Beach Division	Hewlett toward Woodside
Location

Gibson is a station on the Long Island Rail Road's Far Rockaway Branch in the Gibson section of Valley Stream, Nassau County, New York. The station is at Gibson Boulevard and Munro Boulevard.

== History ==
The station opened on May 29, 1929 as part of William R. Gibson's residential development within Valley Stream. The LIRR only agreed to stop in the area if Gibson built the station himself, which he did. The station has mostly remained identical since opening.

== Station layout ==
The station has two high-level side platforms, each 10 cars long.
