= Ocean Electric Railway =

Former streetcar line in Queens, New York

Overview
- Locale: The Rockaways
- Termini: Neponsit; Far Rockaway

Service
- Type: Streetcar
- Operator(s): Long Island Rail Road

History
- Opened: 1898
- Closed: 1928

Technical
- Track gauge: 4 ft 8 1/2 in (1,435 mm) standard gauge
- Minimum radius: (?)
- Electrification: Overhead wires (1898-1905); Third Rail and Batteries (1911-1928)

The Ocean Electric Railway was a streetcar line that operated on The Rockaways in Queens, New York, United States. It ran parallel to parts of the Rockaway Beach Branch and Far Rockaway Branch of the Long Island Rail Road(LIRR). The headquarters of the OER were at the Far Rockaway Long Island Rail Road station which was then located across Mott Avenue from the existing Far Rockaway–Mott Avenue subway station. The Office of Superintendent - Trolleys at that location managed all the LIRR's owned trolley operations.

== History ==
=== Rockaway Village Railroad ===
The Ocean Electric Railway originated as the replacement for the Rockaway Village Railroad (RVR), a horse car line constructed by local businessmen. Like the RVR it was a street railway. It was chartered on April 28, 1897, although trolley services on the Rockaway Peninsula date as far back as 1881.

=== Far Rockaway Railroad ===
On March 18, 1898, the LIRR bought the Far Rockaway Railroad, a 1.1 mile horse-car line, and integrated it into the Ocean Electric.

=== LIRR ownership ===
The purpose of the system was to create a rapid-transit link between the New York and Rockaway Beach Railroad, and the Far Rockaway Branch, formerly owned by the South Side Railroad of Long Island. Both were steam-operated railroads and required a quick connection, although electrification of the Rockaway Beach Branch began on July 26, 1905, and electrification of the Far Rockaway Branch began on December 11, 1905.

In June 1904, a third (middle) track was built between Far Rockaway and Hammels and trolley cars began running in the street from Fairview Avenue, Hammels to Rockaway Park.

Between 1905 and 1911, the LIRR began the transition from overhead wires to third rail power collection cars for the OER on the portions of track it shared with the LIRR's suburban trains between Far Rockaway and Hammels. In October 1905, the LIRR's outside tracks were fitted with third rails and electric train service began to Far Rockaway. Beginning in 1910, third rail was installed on the middle track for the new Pennsylvania Station service. Third rail shoes were on the trolley cars and in 1911 the system ceased to run on overhead wires. Ocean Electric Service was extended to Belle Harbor at Pelham Avenue (now Beach 126th Street) in 1915, and Neponsit at Beach 149th Street on June 8, 1916, unlike the Long Island Rail Road which only went as far as Rockaway Park.

With the exception of those west of Rockaway Park Station and those on Rockaway Beach Boulevard between Arverne and Rockaway Park, most trolley stops were shared with Long Island Railroad stations. Others, such as Frank Avenue Station became LIRR stations in 1922. As trolley service began to decline at the end of World War I, the LIRR prepared to remove involvement with trolleys. The Roche's Beach Branch was abandoned in 1924, the segment east of Hammels was abandoned in 1926, and the remaining section was abandoned in 1928.

== Lines ==
Name	From	To	Route	Notes
	Hammels	Neponsit	Rockaway Beach Boulevard from Beach 75th Street to Beach 116th Street, north to Newport Avenue, west to Beach 142nd Street to Neponsit Avenue to west of Beach 149th Street.	Built from 1904-1916; abandoned October 25, 1928 now Q22 and Q35
	Hammels	Hammels Beach	Hammels Wye; South Leg along Beach 84th Street (formerly Fairview Avenue).	abandoned
	Far Rockaway	Hammels	Long Island Rail Road on the original LIRR tracks shared with LIRR trains Far Rockaway Branch then down Beach 84th Street to join the Rockaway Beach Boulevard line.	abandoned September 9, 1926 now New York City Subway's IND Rockaway Line
	Far Rockaway	Roche's Beach	Long Island Rail Road original Far Rockaway station at Mott Avenue, south on Central Avenue (now Beach 20th Street to New Haven and Brookhaven Avenue, then south on Rockaway Turnpike (now Beach 19th Street) to Roche's Beach, just south of today's Seagirt Boulevard. The southernmost portion of this route was carried by a short trestle over a portion of the beach which often flooded -- a remnant of the Bay of Far Rockaway.	abandoned September 14, 1924
