= Hammels station =

Train station in New York City (1880–1941)

Hammels

General information
- Location: Fairview Avenue (now Beach 84th Street); Hammels, Queens, New York
- Coordinates: 40.59136°N 73.80942°W
- Line: Rockaway Beach Branch
- Platforms: 4 side platforms
- Tracks: 4
- Connections: Ocean Electric Railway

History
- Opened: 1880
- Closed: 1941
- Rebuilt: 1888
- Electrified: July 26, 1905
- Former names: Hammel

Former services
| Preceding station | Long Island Rail Road | Following station |
|---|---|---|
| Beach Channel toward Woodside | Rockaway Beach Division | Holland toward Rockaway Park |
| Arverne toward Valley Stream | Far Rockaway Branch | Terminus |
| Preceding station | Brooklyn Rapid Transit | Following station |
| Broad Channel toward Chambers Street | Union Elevated Broadway Line 1898–1917 | Holland toward Rockaway Park |
| Broad Channel toward Park Row | Union Elevated Fifth Avenue Line 1899–1905 | Holland toward Rockaway Park |
Location

Hammels (formerly Hammel) was a Long Island Rail Road station on the Rockaway Beach Branch in Hammels, Queens. It was located at what is today Beach 84th Street at the west leg of the Hammels Wye.

== History ==
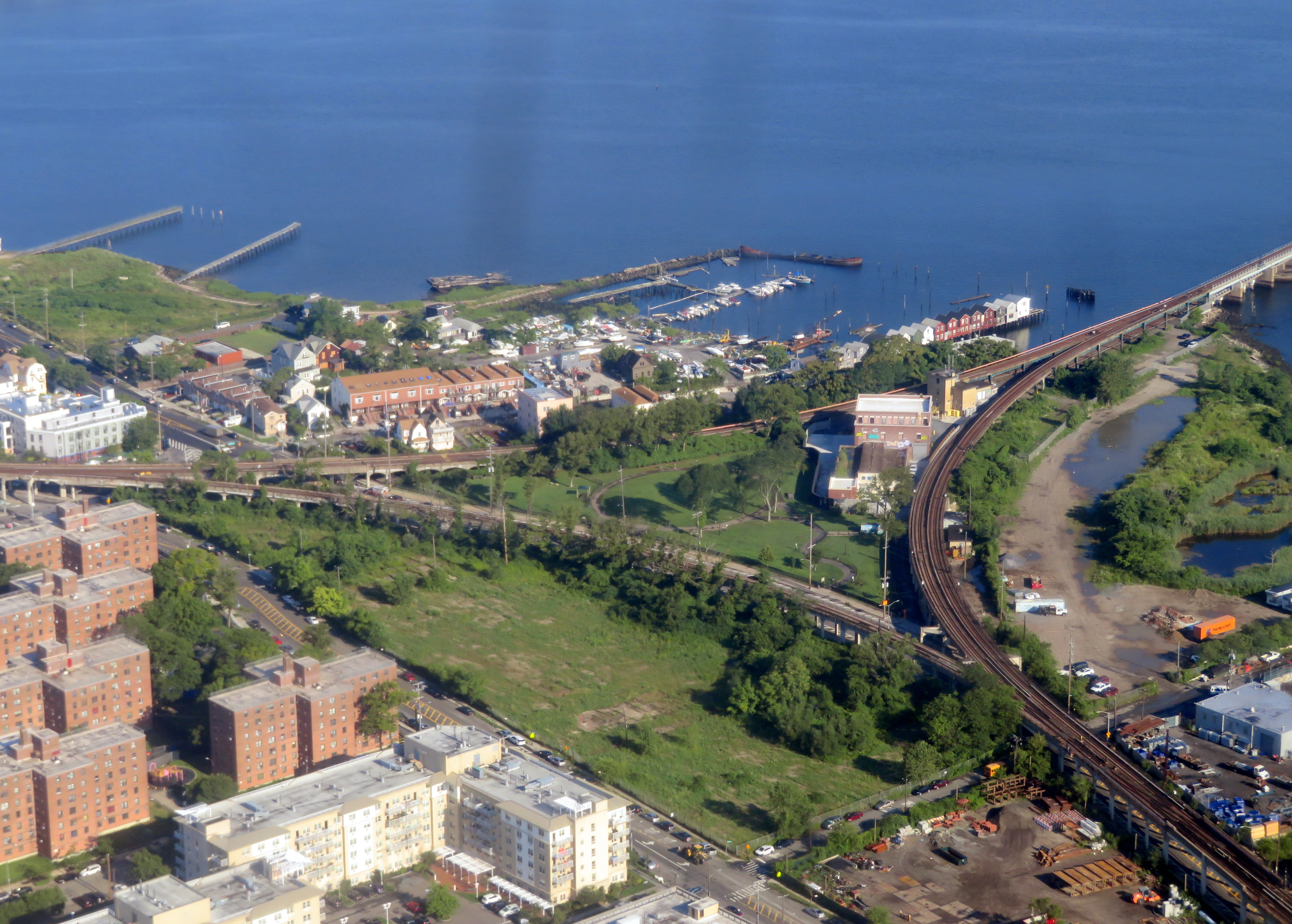
Aerial view of Hammels Wye in 2019. The location of Hammels station was at the west end of the wye, approximately the left edge of the photograph.

Hammels station was originally built in June 1880 by the New York, Woodhaven & Rockaway Railroad. The station and the summer resort community it served were named after local landowner, Louis Hammel (1836-1904), who leased the Eldert House hotel from Garret Eldert in August 1869, even though he also had his own hotel along the coast of Jamaica Bay. Eldert House was located on the east side of what is today Beach 85th Street, and had a separate station built by the former South Side Railroad of Long Island's Far Rockaway Branch called Eldert's Grove station (see below).

In 1887, the NYW&R went bankrupt and was reestablished by Long Island Rail Road president Austin Corbin as the New York and Rockaway Beach Railway. Hammels station survived the takeover. That year a connection was made between the former Far Rockaway Branch and the NY&RB, thus creating what is known today as "Hammels Wye." The SSRRLI abandoned the line west of Hammels after that. Hammels station was rebuilt during the spring of 1888. In 1897, Hammels merged with Hollands and was incorporated as the Village of Rockaway Beach, but the station kept the name. In 1898, Ocean Electric Railway trolleys connected the Far Rockaway Branch to the NY&RB and used Hammels station as a stop. The year Hammel died was also the year the station officially became part of the LIRR's Rockaway Beach Branch. When Beach Channel station closed on May 31, 1905, Hammels became the last station on the Rockaway Beach Branch before crossing the Beach Channel Drawbridge. On April 19, 1907, the LIRR installed the "FX Tower" in an effort to control movements between regular trains and trolleys, which included a branch along Fairview Avenue towards the beach. Trolley services ended east of the station in 1926 and west of the station in 1928, but the southern leg of Hammels Wye continued to serve LIRR trains.

By the early-1940s the LIRR was getting ready to reconstruct the Far Rockaway and Rockaway Beach Branches as elevated lines. From 1941 to 1942 both lines were closed and rebuilt with newly elevated stations. Hammels station would not be one of the ones replaced during the reconstruction, and it was discontinued in 1941.

== Eldert's Grove station ==
Eight years before the NY&RB built Hammels station on their line, the SSRRLI built a station on July 4, 1872 on the Far Rockaway Branch Railroad called Eldert's Grove station. It was designed to serve patrons of the Elderts House, but was abandoned when the connection between the Far Rockaway Branch and Rockaway Beach Branch was made in 1887. Later, it became a stop on the Fairview Avenue Branch of the Ocean Electric Railway.
