= Far Rockaway–Mott Avenue station =

New York City Subway station in Queens

Far Rockaway–Mott Avenue
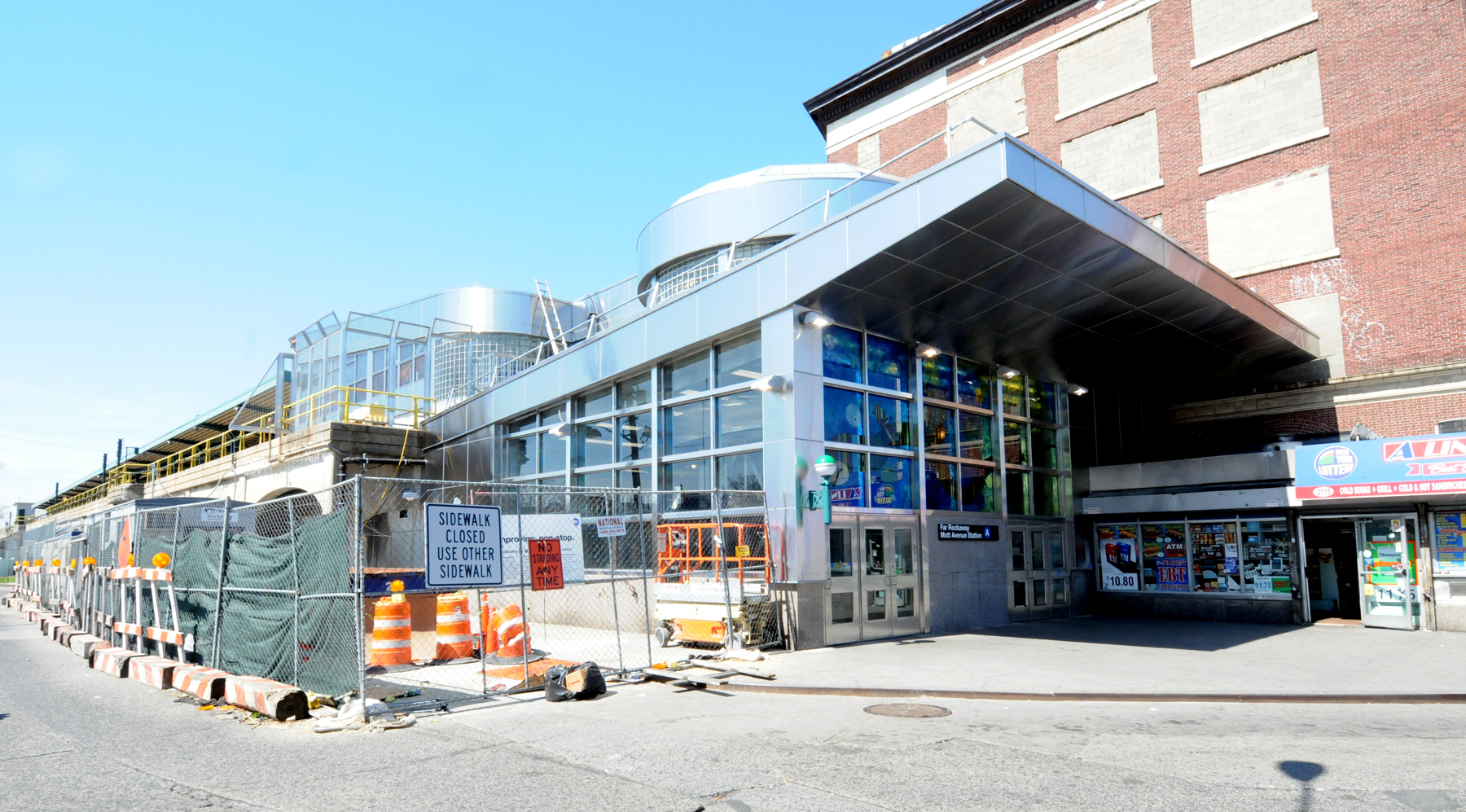

Station statistics
- Address: Mott Avenue & Beach 22nd Street; Queens, New York
- Borough: Queens
- Locale: Far Rockaway
- Coordinates: 40.603983°N 73.755426°W
- Division: B (IND, formerly LIRR Far Rockaway Branch)
- Line: IND Rockaway Line
- Services: A (all times)
- Transit: MTA Bus: Q22, Q113, Q114, QM17; NICE Bus: n31, n31x, n32, n33
- Structure: Elevated
- Platforms: 1 island platform
- Tracks: 2

Other information
- Opened: July 29, 1869; 157 years ago (SSRRLI, then LIRR station)
- Rebuilt: July 15, 1890; 136 years ago, January 16, 1958; 68 years ago (as a subway station)
- Accessible: Yes

Traffic
- 2025: 736,909 ▼26.4%
- Rank: 350 out of 423
Services
Preceding station	New York City Subway	Following station
Beach 25th Street toward Inwood–207th Street	A (New York City Subway service)	Terminus
Location
Location within New York City Subway
Location within New York City
Location within New York
Track layout
Street map
Station service legend
Symbol	Description
Stops all times	Stops all times

The Far Rockaway–Mott Avenue station (announced as the Far Rockaway station) is the eastern terminal station of the New York City Subway's IND Rockaway Line. Originally a Long Island Rail Road station, it is currently the easternmost station in the New York City Subway. It is served by the A train at all times.

As of 2016, this station is the busiest subway station on the Rockaway peninsula. The original surface station on this site was opened in 1869; the current elevated station began operation as a subway station on January 16, 1958. The station was renovated between 2009 and 2012.

== History ==
=== LIRR use ===
Until 1950 the Far Rockaway Branch of the Long Island Rail Road was part of a loop that traveled along the existing route. The line diverges from the present-day Atlantic and Long Beach Branches east of Valley Stream station in Valley Stream, New York. Eastbound trains continued south then southwest, through Five Towns and the Rockaway Peninsula, and onto a trestle across Jamaica Bay through Queens where it reconnected with the Rockaway Beach Branch; westbound trains did the reverse, using the Rockaway Beach Branch to cross the trestle, go through the Rockaways and Five Towns, and continue northeast then north to join the westbound Atlantic Branch.

Far Rockaway station itself was originally built by the Far Rockaway Branch Railroad, a subsidiary of the South Side Railroad of Long Island. Construction on the line began in September 1868, and the station was opened on July 29, 1869. The station was later converted into a freight house, when a second station was moved from Ocean Point Station (a.k.a. Cedarhurst Station), remodeled, and opened on October 1, 1881. The third depot opened on July 15, 1890, while the second depot was sold and moved to a private location in October 1890. The surface station featured a large plaza and depot, serving horse-drawn carriages, taxis, and surface trolleys. The Ocean Electric Railway terminated at the station between 1897 and September 2, 1926, and the station served as the headquarters for the Ocean Electric Railway.

The station also served as the terminus of a Long Island Electric Railway trolley line leading to Jamaica, via New York Avenue (now Guy R. Brewer Boulevard). Following the end of trolley service in November 1933, the depot served buses from Green Bus Lines and Jamaica Buses; the former Jamaica trolley route became Jamaica Buses' Route B (now the Q113 and Q114 buses). Around noon on April 10, 1942, the surface station was closed, and a new elevated station on the current concrete trestle was opened as part of the Long Island Rail Road's grade crossing elimination project. This station had two low-level side platforms.

=== Subway use ===
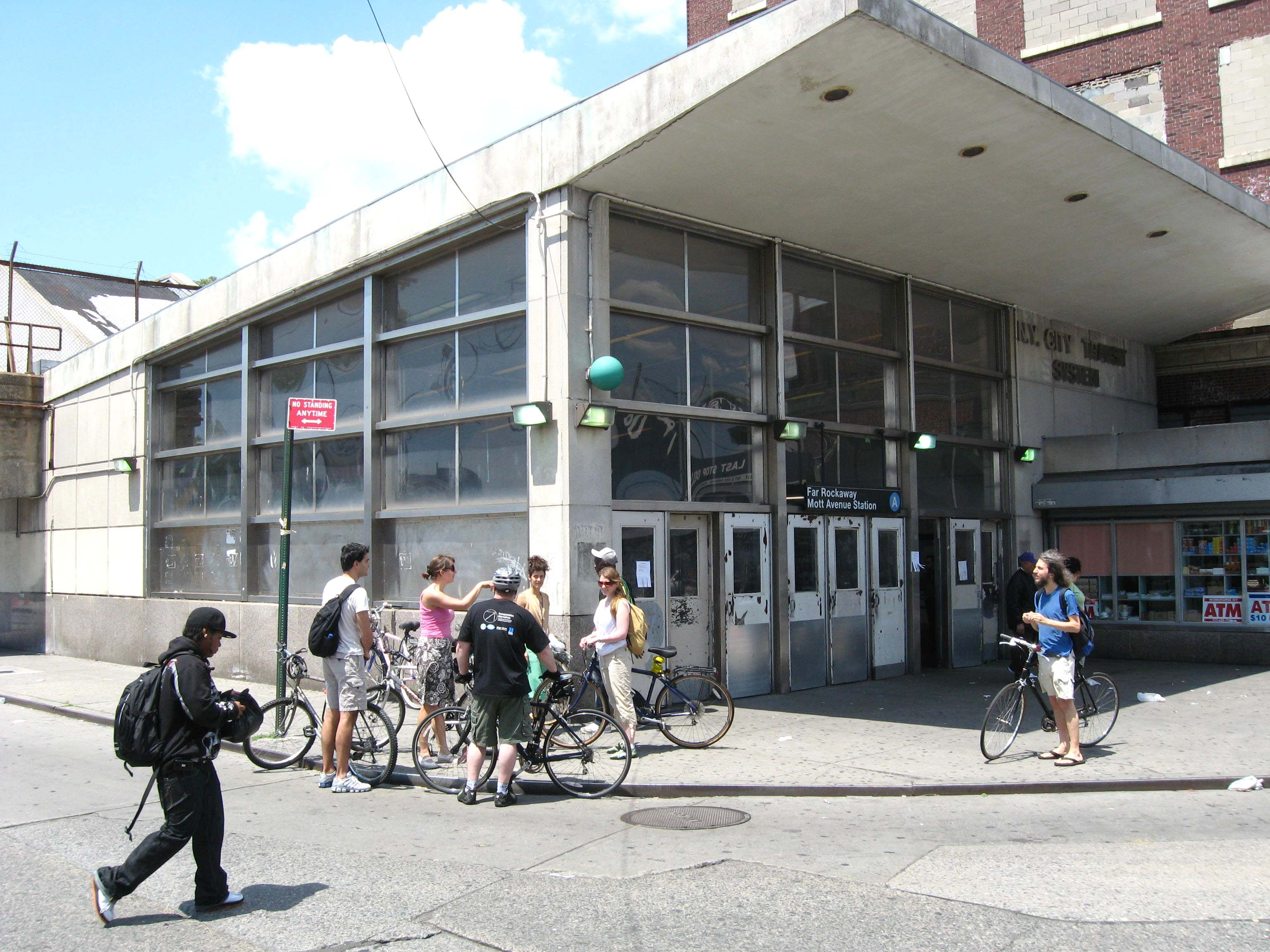
The Far Rockaway station in 2008, prior to renovations

There were frequent fires and maintenance problems on the Jamaica Bay viaduct. The most notorious of these problems was a fire in May 1950 between The Raunt and Broad Channel Stations. After this fire, the LIRR abandoned the Jamaica Bay viaduct and the Queens portion of the Rockaway Beach/Far Rockaway route. On June 11, 1952, the city acquired all trackage west of Mott Avenue, incorporating it as part of the IND Rockaway Line. Service provided by the A train over the line began in June 1956, with the full western spur to Rockaway Park operational. While the remainder of the line operated, with Beach 25th Street–Wavecrest serving as the eastern spur terminal, a new Far Rockaway subway station was constructed, opening on January 16, 1958.

The Far Rockaway LIRR station was moved to a grade-level station at Nameoke Street on February 21, 1958—two blocks from the original station and three blocks from the subway station—becoming the terminus of the Far Rockaway branch. The original site of the LIRR's elevated station and the bus depot, located on the northeast side of Mott Avenue, were replaced with a shopping center and parking lot, which began construction in 1960. The Far Rockaway Shopping Center, as it was called, started undergoing redevelopment in 2017 as part of the Far Rockaway rezoning; it was proposed to replace the shopping center with affordable housing.

In 1981, the MTA listed the Mott Avenue station among the 69 most deteriorated stations in the subway system, despite the fact that the station had become part of the subway system just two decades earlier. From 2009 to 2012, this and eight other stations were renovated for $117 million. At Far Rockaway, the 1950s design of the station house was replaced with metallic facades and a dome enclosure, and upgrading several features including staircases and employee areas. Elevators from the station house to the platforms were added, as were yellow tactile warning strips on the platform edges, making the station ADA-accessible. A glass artwork titled Respite was installed as part of the MTA's Arts for Transit program. The renovated station was unveiled on May 11, 2012. The MTA announced in 2025 that a customer service center would open at the station.

The segment of the line between Howard Beach and the Rockaway Peninsula suffered serious damage during Hurricane Sandy in October 2012 and was out of service for several months. On November 20, 2012, a free shuttle designated as H replaced the Rockaway portion of the A service between Far Rockaway–Mott Avenue and Beach 90th Street via the Hammels Wye; regular service was not restored until May 30, 2013. In 2018, a two-phase program of flood mitigation work at the Hammels Wye junction required further service disruptions; the second phase from July to September diverted all Far Rockaway A trips to Rockaway Park, and the Rockaway Park Shuttle was rerouted to serve the A train's Far Rockaway branch. A train service to Far Rockaway was suspended again between January and May 2025 during reconstruction of the Hammels Wye, and the Rockaway Park Shuttle again served the Far Rockaway branch during that time.

== Disputed age ==
Far Rockaway is the oldest currently operating New York City Subway station, having originally opened 157 years ago, on July 29, 1869, as a Long Island Rail Road station. By contrast, the Gates Avenue station on the BMT Jamaica Line in Brooklyn is the oldest station to have been built specifically for rapid transit use, having opened on May 13, 1885 (141 years ago). The Gates Avenue station is also the oldest continuously operating station in the subway system. The Far Rockaway station was converted from LIRR to subway loading gauges in 1958 and has only operated for 68 years in this capacity. Therefore, by that interpretation, Far Rockaway is actually the fifteenth newest station in the subway system, behind Grand Street; Harlem–148th Street; 57th Street; the three Archer Avenue Line stations; the three IND 63rd Street Line stations; the new South Ferry station; 34th Street–Hudson Yards; and the three Second Avenue Subway stations.

== Station layout ==
The Far Rockaway–Mott Avenue station, the Rockaway Line's eastern terminus, is built on a concrete viaduct and has two tracks and an island platform. The tracks end at bumper blocks just beyond the northeast end of the platform. The station is served by the A train at all times and is its southern terminus; the next stop to the west (railroad north) is Beach 25th Street.

There is no track connection to the current LIRR's Far Rockaway station, and transferring requires a walk of three blocks. A NYCDOT municipal parking facility lies just east of the station between Beach 22nd and Beach 21st Streets, adjacent to the bus loop formerly used by the Q22, QM17, and n33 services that used to terminate at the station.

The doors at the northeast end of the platform lead to stairs down to the street level fare control area. A tower and crew offices are at the southwest end. Two elevators and several staircases inside the station house lead to the platform level. A bodega called the "A Line Deli", previously called the "Last Stop Deli", is attached to the station entrance. It was originally a cafe, having been built along with the station in the 1950s.

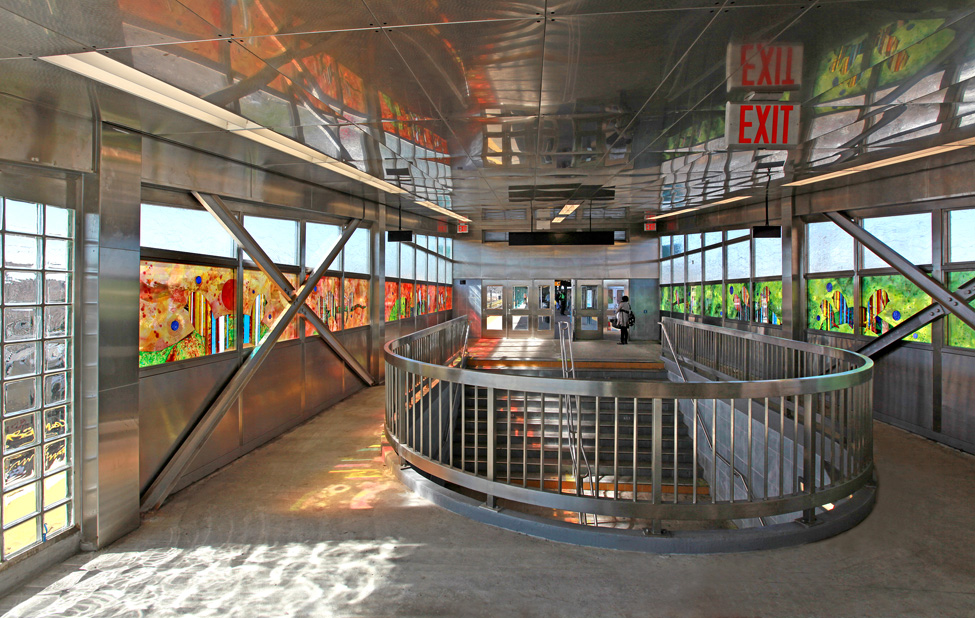
Jason Rohlf's Respite piece in the station

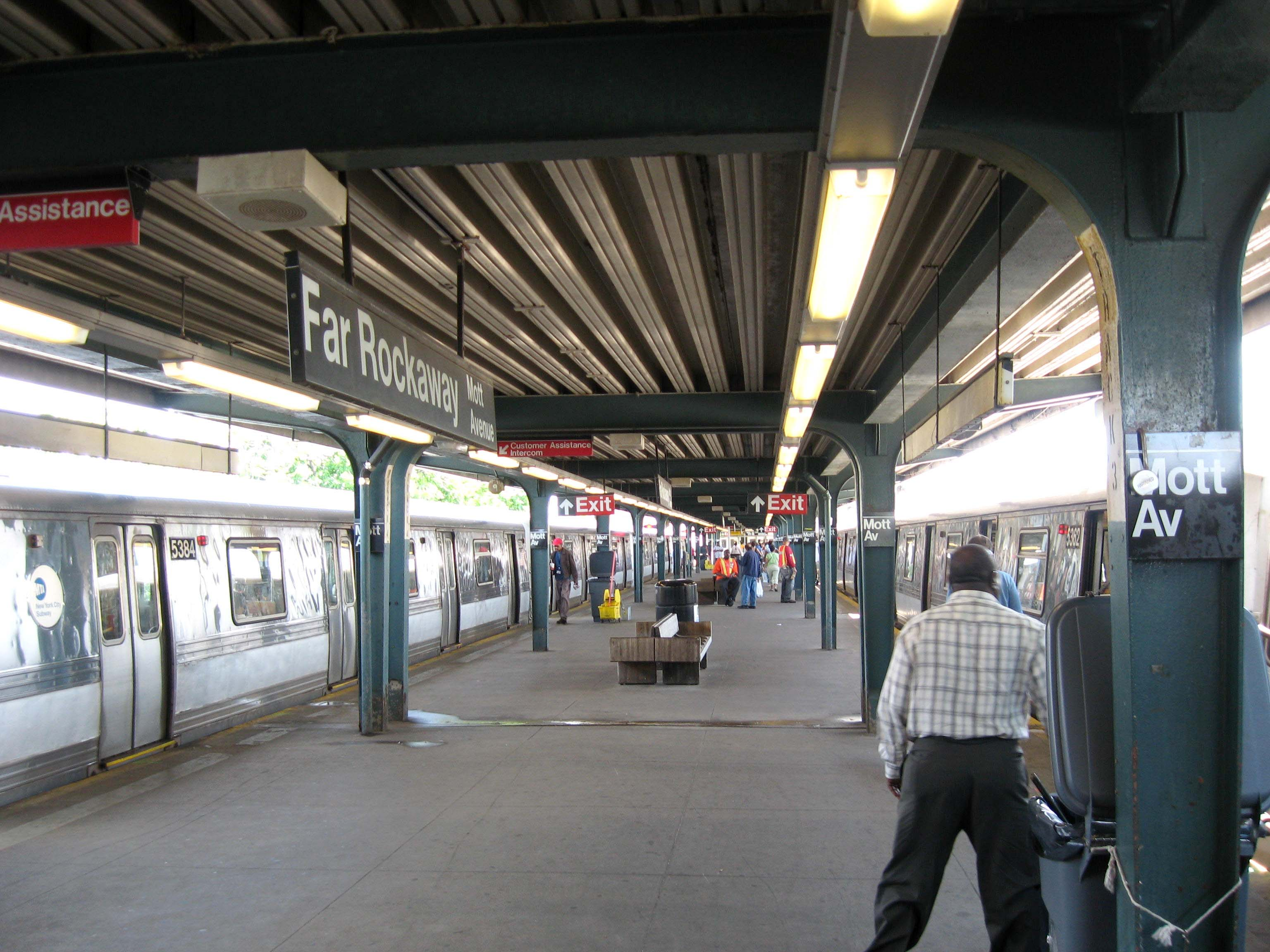
On the platform

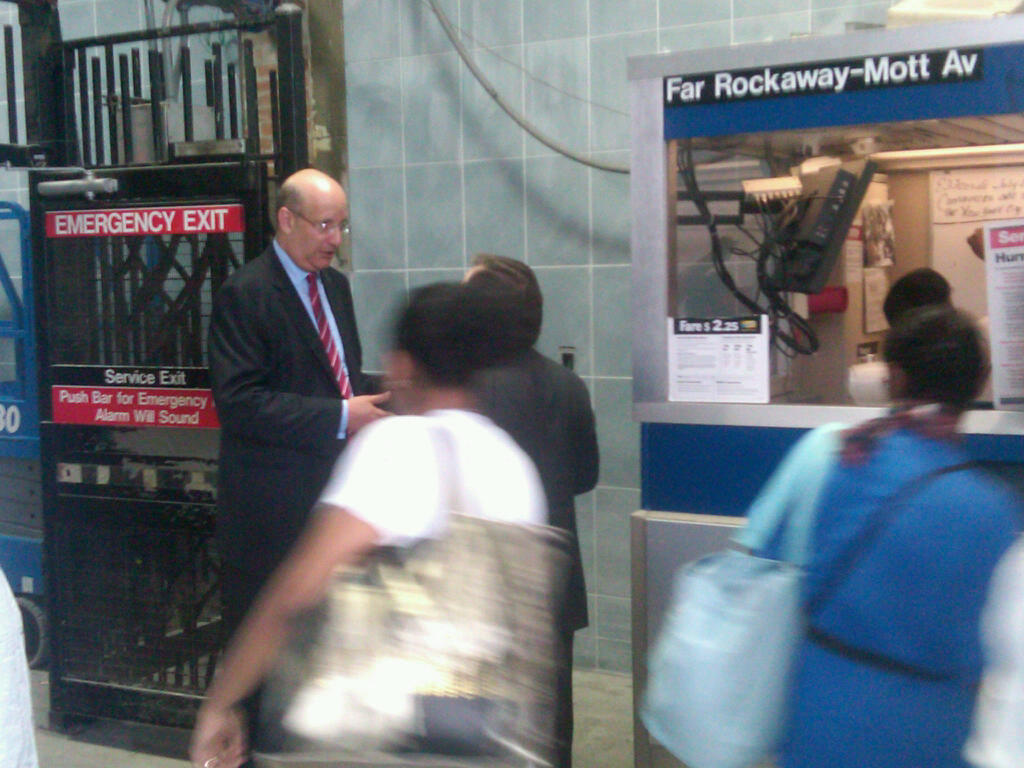
Jay Walder, then-chairman of the MTA, greets Hurricane Irene evacuees

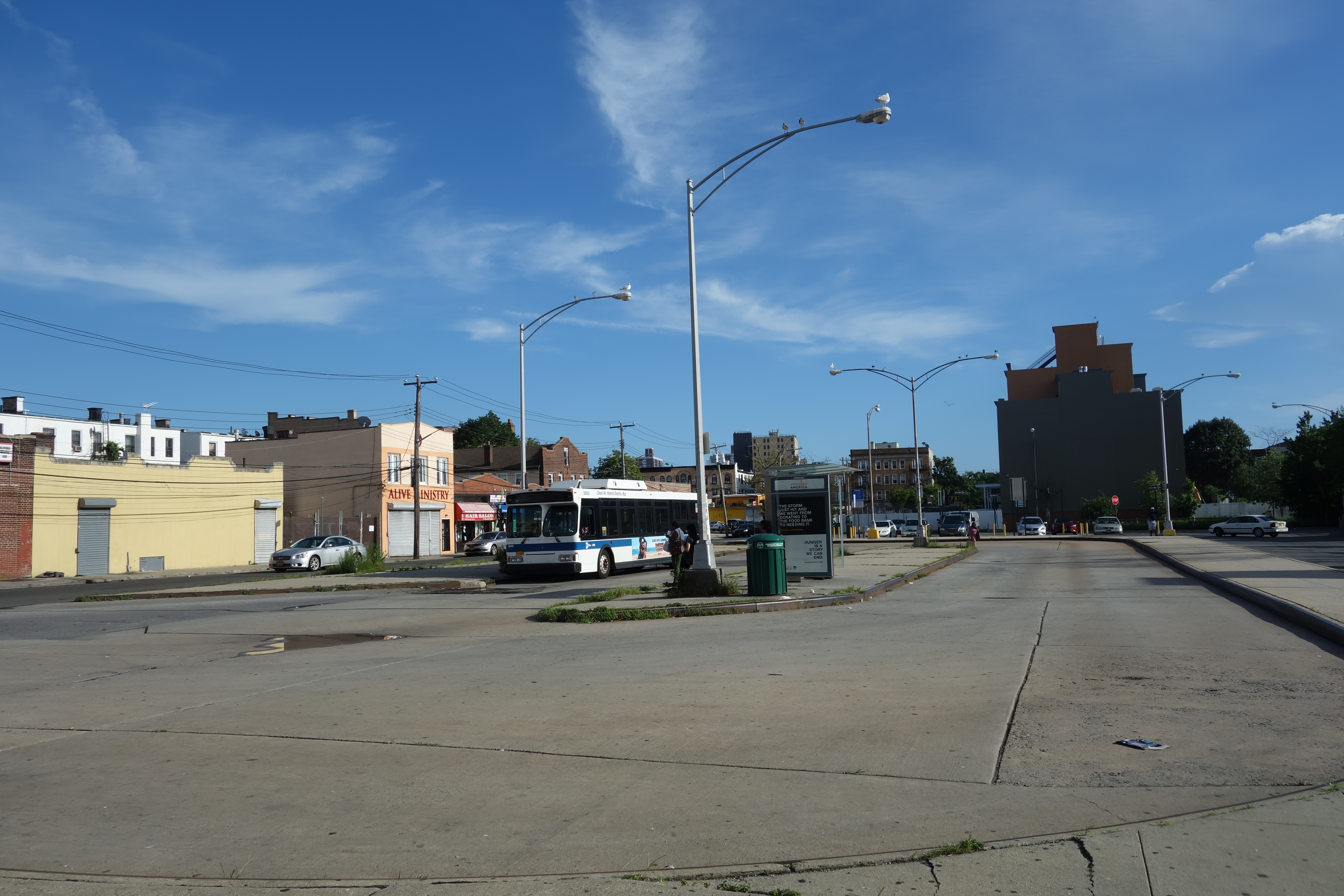
The former bus terminal and parking lot adjacent to the station
