= Beach 98th Street station =

New York City Subway station in Queens

Beach 98 Street
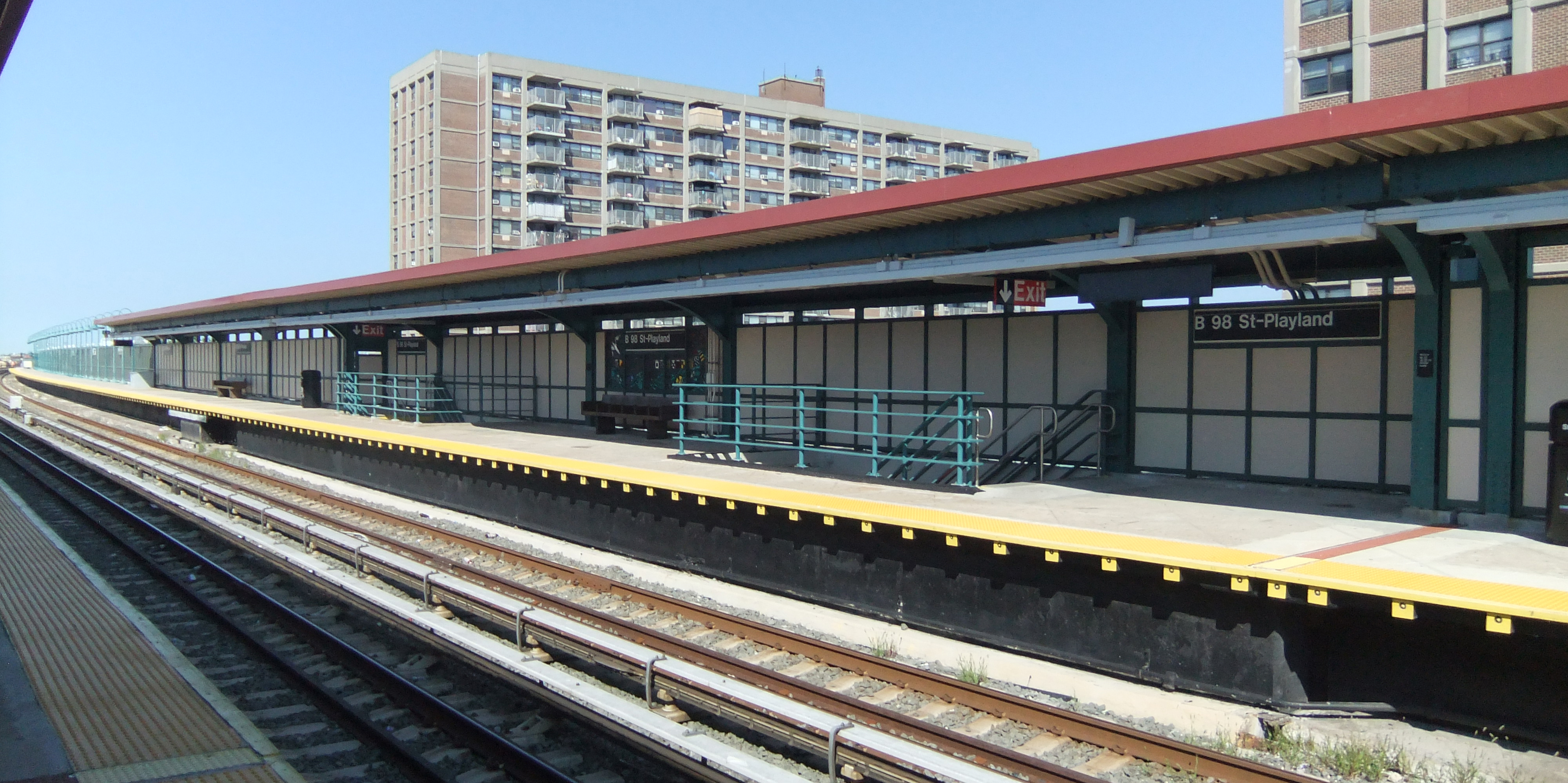
- View of Rockaway Park-bound platform

Station statistics
- Address: Beach 98th Street & Rockaway Freeway; Queens, New York
- Borough: Queens
- Locale: Rockaway Beach
- Coordinates: 40.585441°N 73.820186°W
- Division: B (IND, formerly LIRR Rockaway Beach Branch)
- Line: IND Rockaway Line
- Services: A (rush hours, peak direction); S (all times)
- Transit: MTA Bus: Q22, Q53 SBS, QM16
- Structure: Elevated
- Platforms: 2 side platforms
- Tracks: 2

Other information
- Opened: April 1903; 123 years ago (LIRR station)
- Rebuilt: June 28, 1956; 70 years ago (as a Subway station)
- Former/other names: Steeplechase (1903–May 15, 1933); Playland; Beach 98th Street–Playland

Traffic
- 2025: 76,823 ▼23.6%
- Rank: 421 out of 423
Services
Preceding station	New York City Subway	Following station
Beach 105th Street A S toward Rockaway Park–Beach 116th Street	Rockaway Park	Beach 90th Street A S toward Broad Channel
Former services
Preceding station	Long Island Rail Road	Following station
Holland toward Woodside	Rockaway Beach Division	Seaside toward Rockaway Park
Preceding station	Brooklyn Rapid Transit	Following station
Holland toward Chambers Street	Union Elevated Broadway Line 1898–1917	Seaside toward Rockaway Park
Holland toward Park Row	Union Elevated Fifth Avenue Line 1899–1905	Seaside toward Rockaway Park
Location
Location within New York City Subway
Location within New York City
Location within New York
Track layout
Street map
Station service legend
Symbol	Description
Stops all times	Stops all times
Stops rush hours in the peak direction only	Stops rush hours in the peak direction only

The Beach 98th Street station (signed as the Beach 98th Street–Playland station) is a station on the IND Rockaway Line of the New York City Subway. It is served by the Rockaway Park Shuttle at all times and ten daily rush-hour only A trains.

== History ==
The station was originally built by the Long Island Rail Road in April 1903 as Steeplechase on the Rockaway Beach Branch, and was also a trolley stop of the Ocean Electric Railway. It was renamed Playland on May 15, 1933, for Rockaways' Playland, which was closed in 1985. No trace of the park remains other than the station name. The station was rebuilt as an elevated station, which opened on April 10, 1942. The station was purchased by New York City on October 3, 1955, along with the rest of the Rockaway Beach Branch and Far Rockaway Branch west of Far Rockaway, after a fire on the line's crossing over Jamaica Bay in 1950. Now operated by the New York City Transit Authority, it reopened as a subway station along the IND Rockaway Line on June 28, 1956.

== Station layout ==
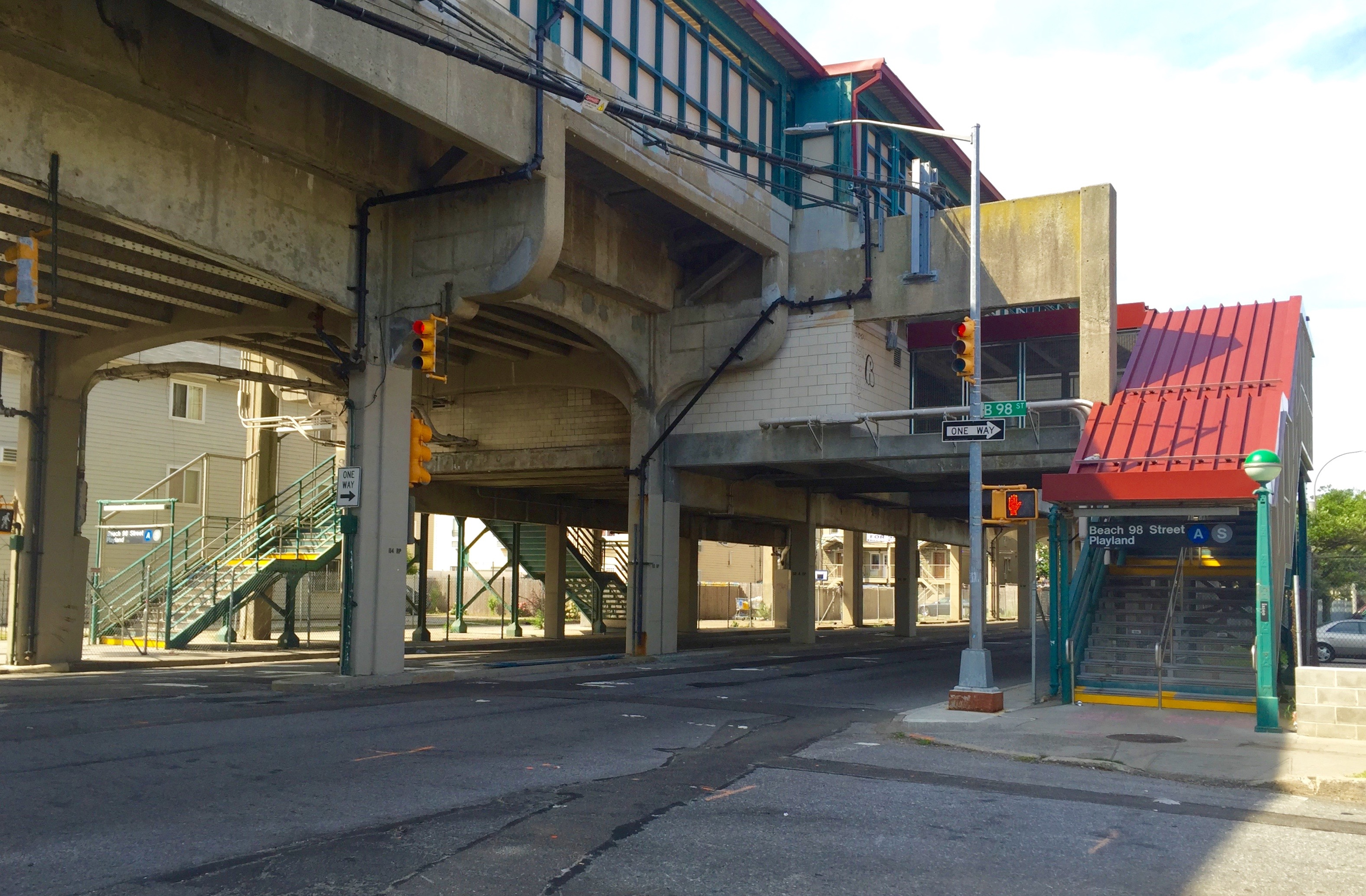
Eastern stairs

The station is built on a concrete viaduct. There are two tracks and two side platforms. The station is served by the Rockaway Park Shuttle at all times and limited A trains during rush hours in the peak direction (toward Manhattan in the morning and toward the Rockaways in the afternoon). It is between Beach 90th Street to the east (railroad north) and Beach 105th Street to the west (railroad south). New lights have been installed. Canopies, mezzanine, and side walls are similar to Beach 90th Street.

=== Exits ===
There is a crossunder to the tiled mezzanine. The southbound platform is longer than the northbound one, and had an exit at the north end of the Rockaway Park bound platform which has been removed. Outside of fare control, there are stairs to either eastern corner of Rockaway Freeway and Beach 98th Street.
