= Beach 90th Street station =

New York City Subway station in Queens

Beach 90 Street
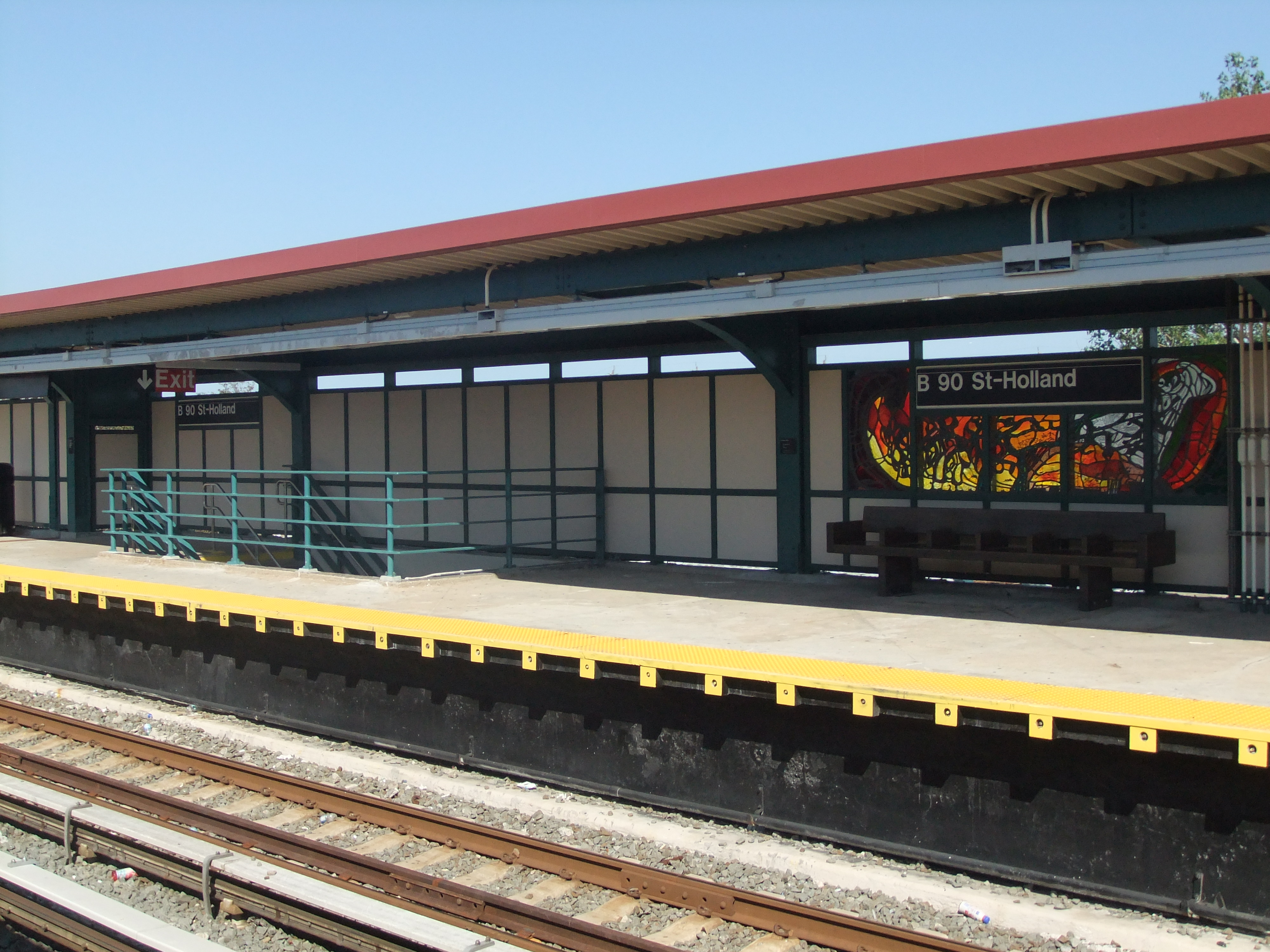
- Artwork on the Rockaway Park-bound platform

Station statistics
- Address: Beach 90th Street & Rockaway Freeway; Queens, New York
- Borough: Queens
- Locale: Rockaway Beach
- Coordinates: 40.588095°N 73.813499°W
- Division: B (IND, formerly LIRR Rockaway Beach Branch)
- Line: IND Rockaway Line
- Services: A (rush hours, peak direction); S (all times)
- Transit: MTA Bus: Q22, Q52 SBS, QM17
- Structure: Elevated
- Platforms: 2 side platforms
- Tracks: 2

Other information
- Opened: June 1880; 146 years ago (LIRR station)
- Rebuilt: June 28, 1956; 70 years ago (as a Subway station)
- Accessible: No; planned
- Former/other names: Beach 90th Street–Holland

Traffic
- 2025: 141,799 ▼23.1%
- Rank: 417 out of 423
Services
Preceding station	New York City Subway	Following station
Beach 98th Street A S toward Rockaway Park–Beach 116th Street	Rockaway Park	Broad Channel A S Terminus
Non-revenue services and lines
Preceding station	New York City Subway	Following station
	no service	Beach 67th Street Hammels Wye
Former services
Preceding station	Long Island Rail Road	Following station
Hammels toward Woodside	Rockaway Beach Division	Playland toward Rockaway Park
Preceding station	Brooklyn Rapid Transit	Following station
Hammels toward Chambers Street	Union Elevated Broadway Line 1898–1917	Steeplechase toward Rockaway Park
Hammels toward Park Row	Union Elevated Fifth Avenue Line 1899–1905	Steeplechase toward Rockaway Park
Location
Location within New York City Subway
Location within New York City
Location within New York
Track layout
Street map
Station service legend
Symbol	Description
Stops all times	Stops all times
Stops rush hours in the peak direction only	Stops rush hours in the peak direction only

The Beach 90th Street station (signed as the Beach 90th Street–Holland station) is a station on the IND Rockaway Line of the New York City Subway. It is served by the Rockaway Park Shuttle at all times and ten daily rush-hour only A trains.

== History ==
The "Holland" designation refers to Michael P. Holland, one of the early developers of the area in which the station was located. It was originally built by the Long Island Rail Road at Holland Avenue and Beach 92nd Street between May and June 1880 along the Rockaway Beach Branch for the nearby Holland Hotel, and was also a trolley stop of the Ocean Electric Railway. It was rebuilt in 1899, and again in 1914 with a baggage storage facility. The station was rebuilt as an elevated station, which opened on April 10, 1942. The station was purchased by New York City on October 3, 1955, along with the rest of the Rockaway Beach Branch and Far Rockaway Branch west of Far Rockaway, after a fire on the line's crossing over Jamaica Bay in 1950. Now operated by the New York City Transit Authority, it reopened as a subway station along the IND Rockaway Line on June 28, 1956.

After Hurricane Sandy hit and destroyed the long stretch of the IND Rockaway Line, this was a terminal of the temporary H shuttle until May 30, 2013, when the A train and the Rockaway Park Shuttle were restored to the Rockaways. During that time, the Rockaway Park Shuttle was not in operation and A service was cut to Howard Beach–JFK Airport.

As part of its 2025–2029 Capital Program, the MTA has proposed making the station wheelchair-accessible in compliance with the Americans with Disabilities Act of 1990.

== Station layout ==
The station is built on a concrete viaduct. There are two tracks and two side platforms. The station is served by the Rockaway Park Shuttle at all times and limited A trains during rush hours in the peak direction (toward Manhattan in the morning and toward the Rockaways in the afternoon). It is between Broad Channel to the east (railroad north) and Beach 98th Street to the west (railroad south). New lights were installed in 2010.

=== Exits ===
There is a crossunder to the tiled mezzanine. Outside of fare control, there are stairs to either eastern corner of Rockaway Freeway and Beach 90th Street. The southbound side had an additional exit on the south end, which has been removed.
