= Beach 105th Street station =

New York City Subway station in Queens

Beach 105 Street
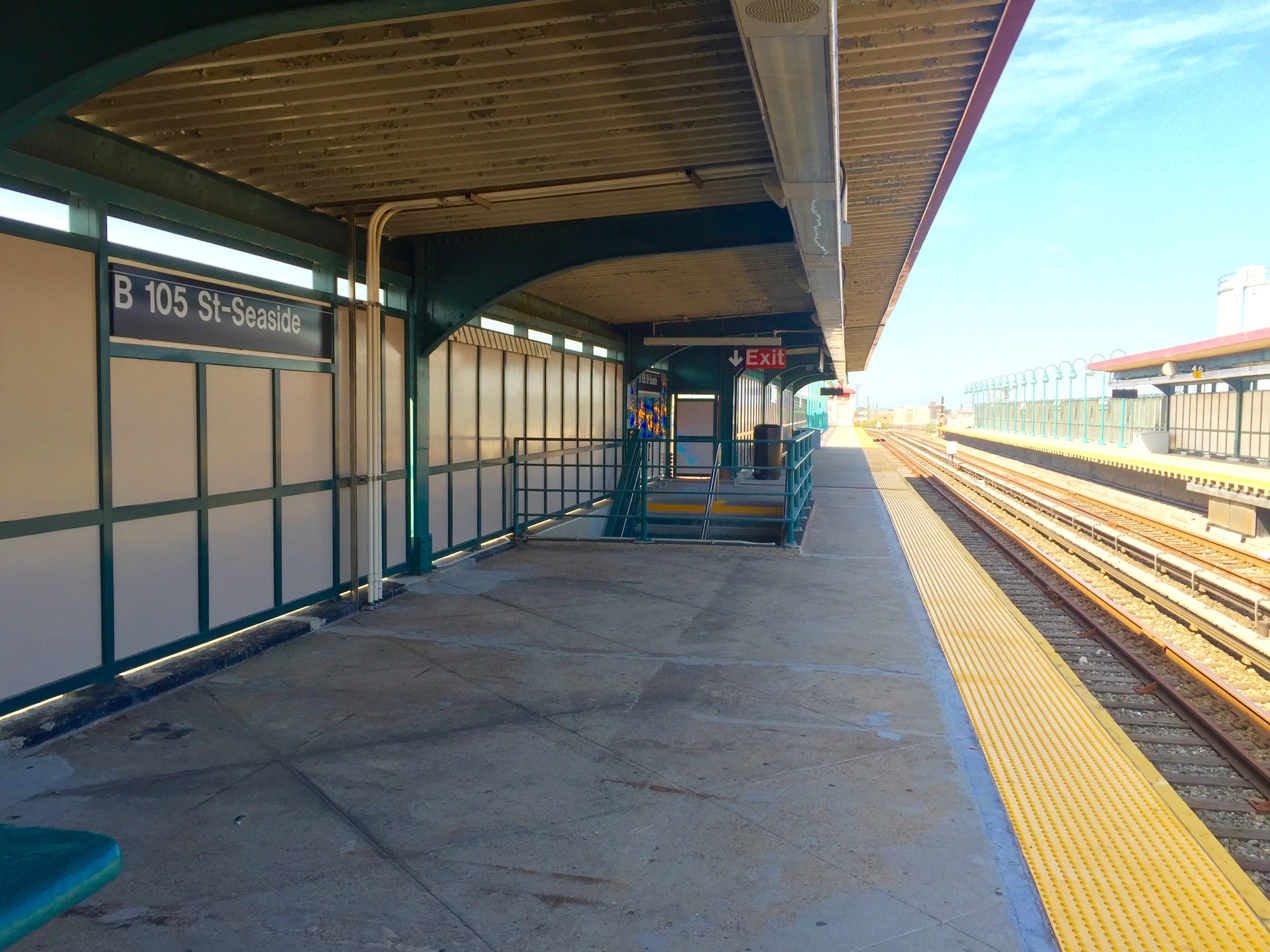
- Broad Channel-bound platform

Station statistics
- Address: Beach 105th Street & Rockaway Freeway; Queens, New York
- Borough: Queens
- Locale: Rockaway Beach
- Coordinates: 40.583217°N 73.827594°W
- Division: B (IND, formerly LIRR Rockaway Beach Branch)
- Line: IND Rockaway Line
- Services: A (rush hours, peak direction); S (all times)
- Transit: MTA Bus: Q22, Q53 SBS, QM16; NYC Ferry: Rockaway (at Rockaway Landing)
- Structure: Elevated
- Platforms: 2 side platforms
- Tracks: 2

Other information
- Opened: 1880; 146 years ago (LIRR station)
- Rebuilt: June 28, 1956; 70 years ago (as a Subway station)
- Former/other names: Beach 105th Street–Seaside

Traffic
- 2025: 55,818
- Rank: 422 out of 423
Services
Preceding station	New York City Subway	Following station
Rockaway Park–Beach 116th Street A S Terminus	Rockaway Park	Beach 98th Street A S toward Broad Channel
Former services
Preceding station	Long Island Rail Road	Following station
Playland toward Woodside	Rockaway Beach Division	Rockaway Park Terminus
Preceding station	Brooklyn Rapid Transit	Following station
Steeplechase toward Chambers Street	Union Elevated Broadway Line 1898–1917	Rockaway Park Terminus
Steeplechase toward Park Row	Union Elevated Fifth Avenue Line 1899–1905	Rockaway Park Terminus
Location
Location within New York City Subway
Location within New York City
Location within New York
Track layout
Street map
Station service legend
Symbol	Description
Stops all times	Stops all times
Stops rush hours in the peak direction only	Stops rush hours in the peak direction only

The Beach 105th Street station (signed as the Beach 105th Street–Seaside station) is a station on the IND Rockaway Line of the New York City Subway, located at Beach 105th Street on the Rockaway Freeway in Queens. It is served by the Rockaway Park Shuttle at all times and ten daily rush-hour only A trains.

== History ==
This station previously had six different names. It was originally opened by the Long Island Rail Road in 1880 as Seaside station (also an earlier name for Babylon) for the Rockaway Beach Branch at 102nd Street. It also included a trolley stop of the Ocean Electric Railway, as well as an OER spur to the Neponsit-Rockaway Beach Branch. A second station at Beach 104th Street became its replacement in April 1888, only to be burned on September 20, 1892.

The third station was built in 1892 and burned on August 29, 1893 during a storm, which ended up sparing the neighborhood around it. The fourth station was built in 1894 and renovated between April and May 1899. The station was rebuilt as an elevated station, which opened on April 10, 1942.

A 1950 fire at The Raunt destroyed the trestle across Jamaica Bay, forcing the LIRR to reroute Rockaway Beach service along the Far Rockaway Branch through the Hammels Wye for the next five years. The station was purchased by New York City on October 3, 1955, along with the rest of the Rockaway Beach Branch and Far Rockaway Branch west of Far Rockaway, after a fire on the line's crossing over Jamaica Bay in 1950. Now operated by the New York City Transit Authority, it reopened as a subway station along the IND Rockaway Line on June 28, 1956.

As part of the 2010–2014 Metropolitan Transportation Authority's Capital Program, new crossovers will be built at this station in order to provide resiliency in the event of major flooding, like from Hurricane Sandy. The crossovers would allow the station to be used as a terminal in the event that the terminal at Beach 116th Street was unavailable. In addition to the construction of the switches, a relay room will be built and new signals will be installed. Design work on the project started in August 2017, and finished in January 2019. Construction will start some time in the future.

== Station layout ==
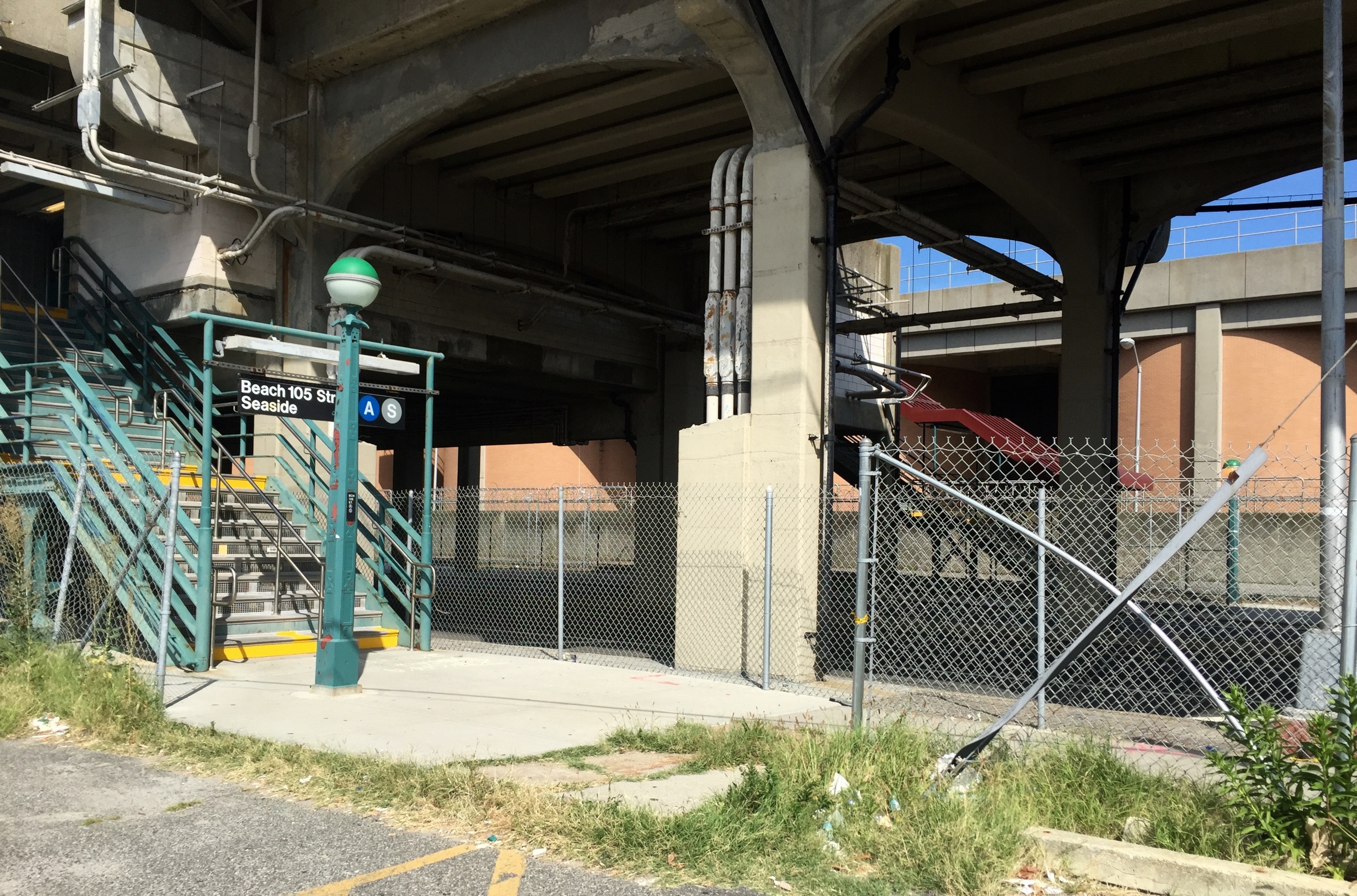
Eastern stairs

This elevated station has two tracks and two side platforms on a concrete viaduct. The station is served by the Rockaway Park Shuttle at all times and limited A trains during rush hours in the peak direction (toward Manhattan in the morning and toward the Rockaways in the afternoon). It is between Beach 98th Street to the east (railroad north) and Rockaway Park–Beach 116th Street to the west (railroad south). Both platforms have beige windscreens and canopies with green support columns in the center and full height fences at both ends. South of this station, the IND Rockaway Line descends to ground level.

=== Exits ===
The station's only entrance/exit is an elevated station house beneath the tracks. It has a station agent booth, turnstile bank, waiting area that allows a free transfer between directions, two staircases to each platform at the center, and two staircases going down to either side of Rockaway Freeway between Beach 105th and Beach 104th Streets. The two southern staircases are connected to the station house with a canopied overpass. The Rockaway Park-bound platform had an exit at the north end, which has been removed.

== Ridership ==
In 1985, the station had only 262 paying daily riders on a typical weekday, not counting farebeaters, making it one of the least used stations in the system. In 2019, it was the least-used station out of all 424 stations in the New York City Subway system, serving 88,439 passengers, an average of fewer than 250 people per day. As of 2022, the Beach 105th Street station is the system's second-least-used station with 41,437 riders.
