= Rockaway Park Shuttle =

New York City Subway shuttle service

- Rockaway Park Shuttle

- Rockaway Park Shuttle train of R211As at Rockaway Park–Beach 116th Street.

- Northern end: Broad Channel (Rockaway Boulevard on summer weekends)
- Southern end: Rockaway Park–Beach 116th Street
- Length: 5 car, 300-foot train sets; 10 car, 600-foot sets on summer weekends
- Stations: 5 (9 on summer weekends)
- Rolling stock: R211A (Rolling stock assignments subject to change)
- Depot: Pitkin Yard
- Started service: June 28, 1956; 70 years ago

The Rockaway Park Shuttle is a New York City Subway shuttle train that operates in Queens. It is the latest iteration of the Rockaway Shuttle services that have been running on the Rockaway peninsula since 1956. This shuttle train provides service to the central part of the peninsula, running between Rockaway Park–Beach 116th Street to the west and Broad Channel to the east, where it connects with the A train. The fully above-ground route operates on trackage that was originally part of the Long Island Rail Road's Rockaway Beach Branch until the mid-1950s. In the summertime on weekends during the day, to eliminate an additional transfer and thus ease beach access, the Rockaway Park Shuttle is typically extended four stations north of Broad Channel to Rockaway Boulevard, the easternmost station shared by Rockaway-bound and Lefferts Boulevard-bound A trains.

Like the other two shuttles, 42nd Street in Manhattan and Franklin Avenue in Brooklyn, it is marked with the letter "S" and its route bullet is colored dark gray on route signs, station signs, rolling stock, and the official subway map. The internal designator for this service is H, though the MTA does not show this on any maps, train rollsigns, or schedules; the designation S^{R} is also sometimes used on public documents.

Prior to 1993, the Rockaway Park Shuttle used multiple different designations, including the E, CC, and H with an emblem colored blue like the IND Eighth Avenue Line. The H formerly ran north to Euclid Avenue in Brooklyn via the IND Fulton Street Line, as well as to Far Rockaway–Mott Avenue to the east. In 2012–13, after Hurricane Sandy destroyed the IND Rockaway Line's connection to the rest of the system, the blue H shuttle provided service from Far Rockaway–Mott Avenue to Beach 90th Street.

== Service history ==
=== 1950s to 1980s ===
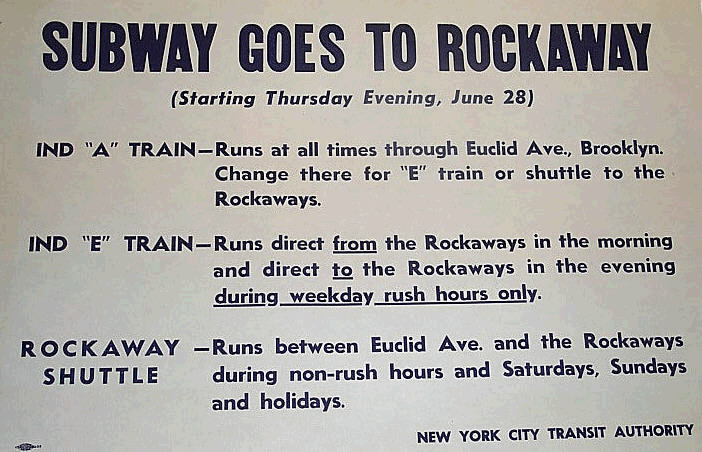
A sign announcing Rockaway Line services effective June 28, 1956, when Rockaway Line subway service began

The Rockaway Shuttle started operating on June 28, 1956. During its early years, it essentially provided non-rush hour and weekend service between Euclid Avenue and either Far Rockaway–Mott Avenue or Rockaway Park–Beach 116th Street. At first, the route did not have an official assigned letter code on maps, although sometimes trains displayed either the A or E route on their rollsign boxes.

Beginning on February 1, 1962, the Rockaway Shuttle was officially lettered on maps and trains as HH (which had last been used for the Court Street Shuttle, discontinued 16 years earlier) to make it easier to distinguish E trains from shuttle trains. From November 26, 1967, to September 10, 1972, it was colored red, with daytime non-rush hour and weekend service usually available between Rockaway Park and Euclid Avenue or Broad Channel, plus some weekday mid-afternoon service provided between Far Rockaway and Euclid Avenue.

During the late night-early morning hours, service operating to and from Euclid Avenue on the IND Fulton Street Line in Brooklyn was extended between roughly midnight and 6:00 a.m., which were the hours when the A did not run to and from Far Rockaway. At those times, the HH would operate from Euclid Avenue to Rockaway Park, then to Far Rockaway via Hammels Wye, and finally back to Euclid Avenue, thus earning this night owl service the unofficial nickname of Rockaway Round-Robin.

Between September 11, 1972, and August 29, 1976, the shuttle's identifier was designated as a branch of the E (colored aqua blue), and during rush hours was extended all the way to Jamaica–179th Street on the IND Queens Boulevard Line in Queens, which was the northern terminal for normal E service. Afterward, the designation CC (colored green) was used for the shuttle, running to Broad Channel, although during rush hours this train was extended all the way to Bedford Park Boulevard on the IND Concourse Line in the Bronx. In 1979, the MTA released a new coloring scheme for subway routes based on trunk line; CC service was assigned the color blue, because in Manhattan it used the IND Eighth Avenue Line.

On May 6, 1985, the shuttle's identifier was changed to H (still colored blue) instead of reverting to HH, as the New York City Subway system had abolished two-letter designations by then.

=== 1990s changes ===
In January 1991, a reduction of service along the Central Park West corridor to remove excess capacity was proposed. As a result of the initial plan to make A service local in Manhattan and Brooklyn (before it was amended to reroute the A via Sixth Avenue), H service would be expanded. This change was necessitated because all Central Park West express service would operate via Sixth Avenue, leaving no express service along Eighth Avenue south of 59th Street–Columbus Circle; daytime service would operate between 34th Street–Penn Station and either Ozone Park–Lefferts Boulevard or Far Rockaway–Mott Avenue in Queens, making express stops in Manhattan and Brooklyn and local stops in Queens. Additional rush hour trains to and from Rockaway Park–Beach 116th Street would have provided limited service. Late night service would initially be replaced by A trains before the service plan was amended for late night service to be replaced by C trains instead. This service change would have been implemented in October 1991, pending approval from the MTA board.

In 1991, at a series of meetings, the NYCTA presented proposed changes to A, C, and H service that would shorten the length of the C, simplify the service pattern during late nights to most efficiently serve the majority of riders, provide direct express service to Rockaway Park during rush hours in the peak direction, and provide shuttle connections during non-peak periods between Rockaway Park and through A train service. The service pattern devised was designed to improve operations by reducing route length and complexity, making service more attractive, simplifying confusing service patterns, and reducing transfers for passengers traveling during late nights. At the time, A service ran to Lefferts Boulevard and Far Rockaway during the day while the C ran to Rockaway Park during rush hours. During late nights, A service ran to Lefferts Boulevard, while service to both branches in the Rockaways was provided by the round-robin H shuttle service to Euclid Avenue.

As part of the changes proposed, round-robin shuttle service would be discontinued; late-night A service would operate from Manhattan to Far Rockaway; and service to Lefferts Boulevard and Rockaway Park would be provided by separate shuttle services with timed transfers to through A service. Rush hour local C service to Rockaway Park would be replaced by through A express service. In addition, H service to Rockaway Park would be replaced by the Rockaway Park Shuttle, which would run between Broad Channel and Rockaway Park, and C service would be truncated to Euclid Avenue. In April 1992, the MTA Board approved the proposed change to service in the Rockaways, which were expected to encourage ridership growth in the long term, and reduced NYCTA's annual operating budget by $20,000. The changes took effect on October 23, 1992.

=== 2000s to present ===
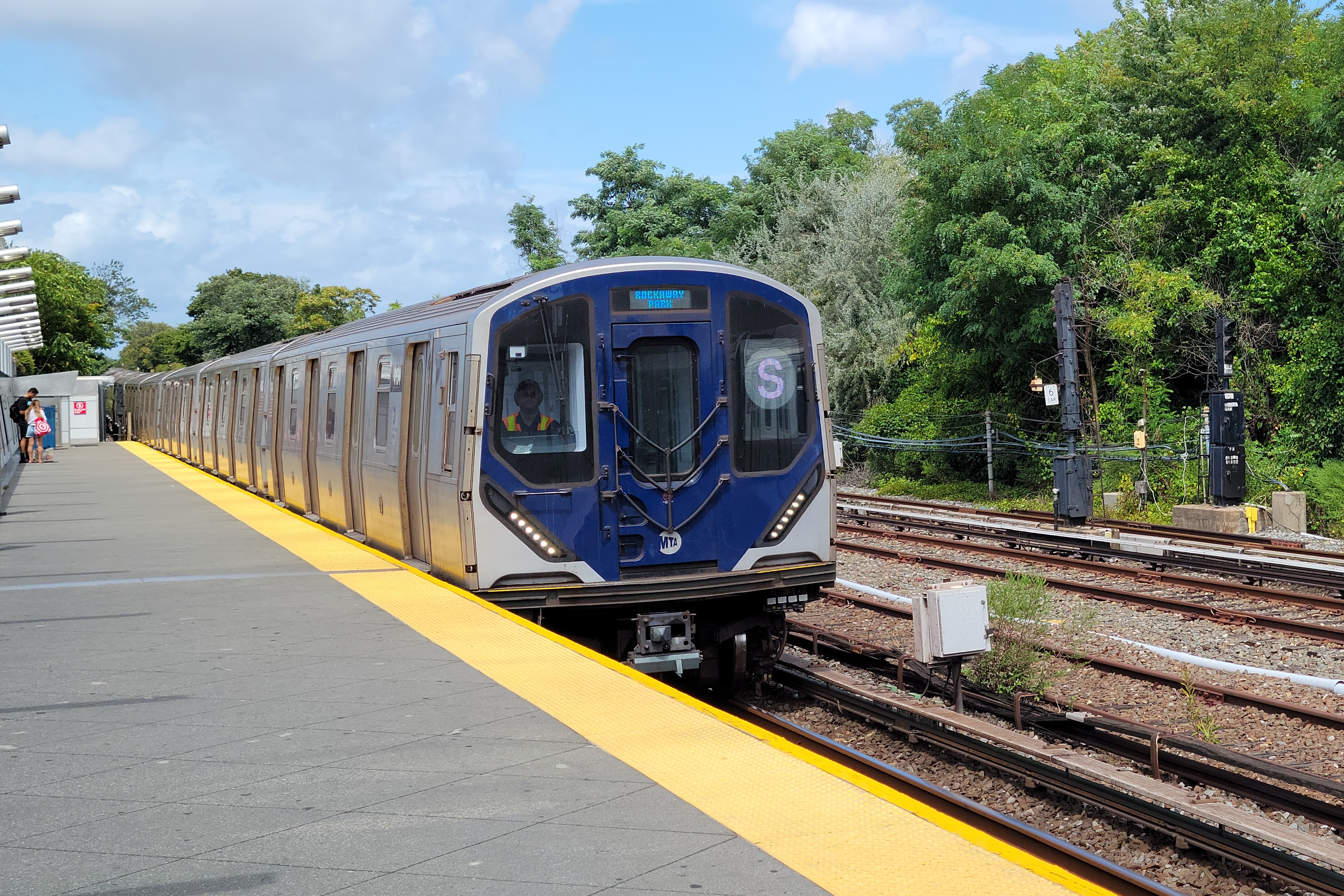
Summertime Rockaway Park-bound R211 Shuttle train arriving at Howard Beach–JFK Airport. During summer weekends, the shuttle is extended north of Broad Channel to Rockaway Boulevard.

Formerly, some maps and trains had shown the current S service in blue. Since May 2004, the official system map shows the Rockaway Park Shuttle as carrying a grey bullet. Recent prints, however, depicted the service itself in blue, but has been changed back to grey, as of January 2013. In order to distinguish it from the other shuttles, NYCT Rapid Transit operations still refers to it internally as the H.

The Rockaway Park Shuttle was suspended following the aftermath of Hurricane Sandy, due to track being washed out between Broad Channel and Howard Beach. On November 20, 2012, a free shuttle designated as H replaced the Rockaway portion of the A service between Far Rockaway–Mott Avenue and Beach 90th Street via the Hammels Wye. Additionally, the remainder of the Rockaway Line from Beach 90th Street to Rockaway Park was damaged and awaited repair. With the emergency implementation of this service, the H rollsign designation returned to public usage for the first time since 1993. Despite the service's free status, few riders used the signed H service, partly due to the extremely low ridership at Rockaway stations to begin with; this ridership had been lowered further since Hurricane Sandy. In addition, the service did not run during late nights, and the service was only connected to the rest of the subway via a shuttle bus to Howard Beach. On May 30, 2013, full service to the Rockaways was restored, and the free H service was discontinued.

In late May 2016, the MTA announced that the Rockaway Park Shuttle would be extended from Broad Channel to Rockaway Boulevard on weekends from mid-June until Labor Day 2016. This allowed passengers on both Lefferts Boulevard and Far Rockaway-bound trains to transfer to the shuttle, and for shuttle passengers to transfer to more frequent A train service at Rockaway Boulevard. This summer weekend extension was implemented again starting in 2017 between Memorial and Labor Days. However, the extension for 2018 ended on July 1 and was replaced by rerouted A trains to Rockaway Park due to construction on Hammels Wye. In 2019, the summer extension was reinstated for the whole season, while in 2020, the summer extension was reinstated in July. Since then, the seasonal extension has occurred on an annual basis.

From April 9 to May 18, 2018, and again from July 2 to September 3, 2018, the shuttle ran between Rockaway Park–Beach 116th Street and Far Rockaway–Mott Avenue due to a planned two-phase program of flood mitigation work along the Hammels Wye. To allow for repairs on the South Channel Bridge, for 17 weeks starting on January 17, 2025, the Rockaway Park Shuttle ran fare free, using the same pattern; regular service resumed on May 19, 2025.

== Signage history ==
H/HH service

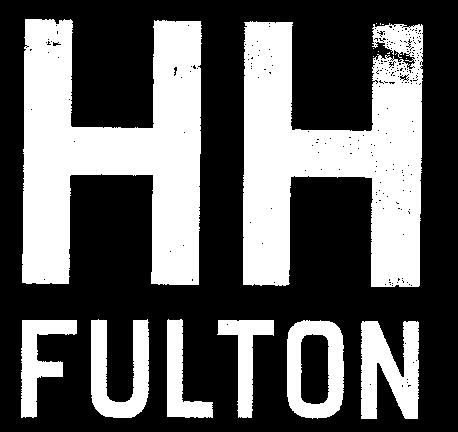
Pre 1967, the old HH bullet for the Court St Shuttle was used for the Rockaway Shuttle

1967-1972 bullet. Between 1972-1985, the CC or E represented the HH

1985-1987 bullet

1987-1992 & 2012-2013 bullet. The H is the NYCT designation for this shuttle
S service

The current bullet used since 1992

The 1st alternate bullet used since 1992. This bullet can be seen on some R46s

The 2nd alternate bullet used since 2018, displayed on MTA websites

== Stations ==
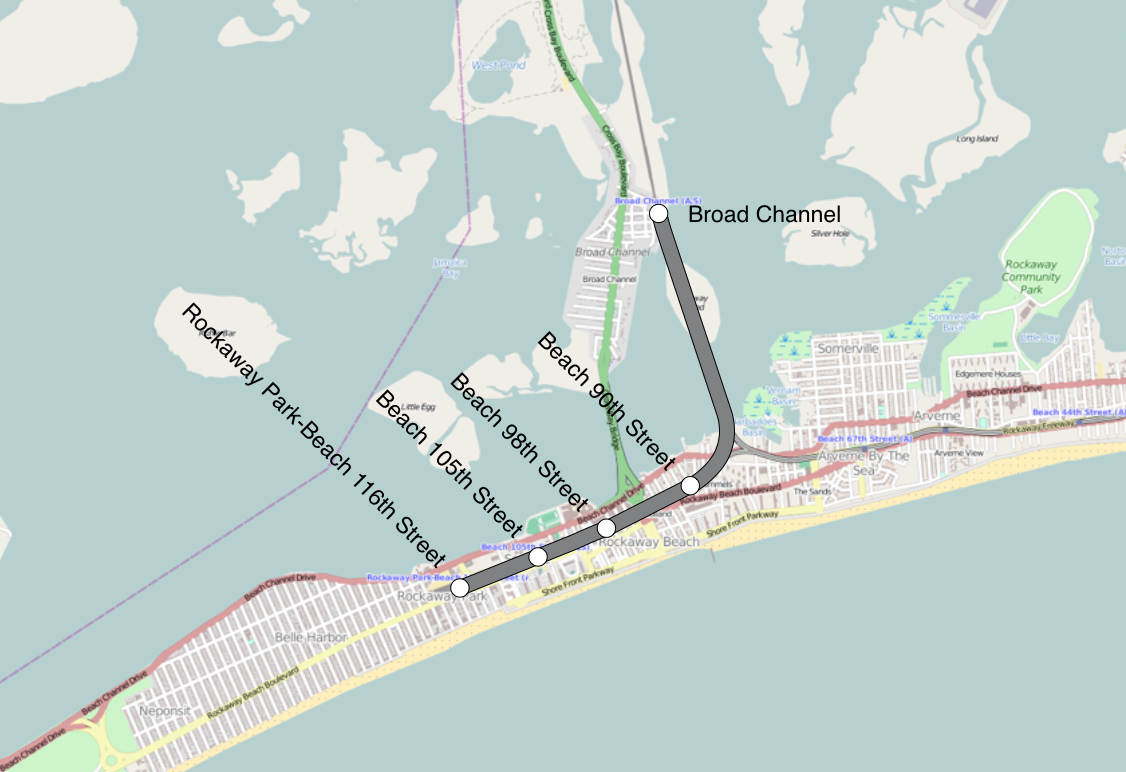
To scale line map

For a more detailed station listing, see IND Rockaway Line.

Station service legend
Stops all times	Stops 24 hours a day
Time period details
Disabled access	Station is compliant with the Americans with Disabilities Act
↑	Station is compliant with the Americans with Disabilities Act in the indicated direction only
↓	Station is compliant with the Americans with Disabilities Act in the indicated direction only
	Elevator access to mezzanine only

Rockaway Park Shuttle service	Stations	Disabled access	Subway transfers	Connections/Other Notes
Rockaway Line
Stops all times	Broad Channel		A	Q52/Q53 Select Bus Service
Stops all times	Beach 90th Street		A	Q52 Select Bus Service
Stops all times	Beach 98th Street		A	Q53 Select Bus Service
Stops all times	Beach 105th Street		A	
Stops all times	Rockaway Park–Beach 116th Street	Disabled access	A	Q53 Select Bus Service
