= Rockaway Freeway =

Avenue in Queens, New York

Coordinates: 40°35′30.82″N 73°47′32.17″W

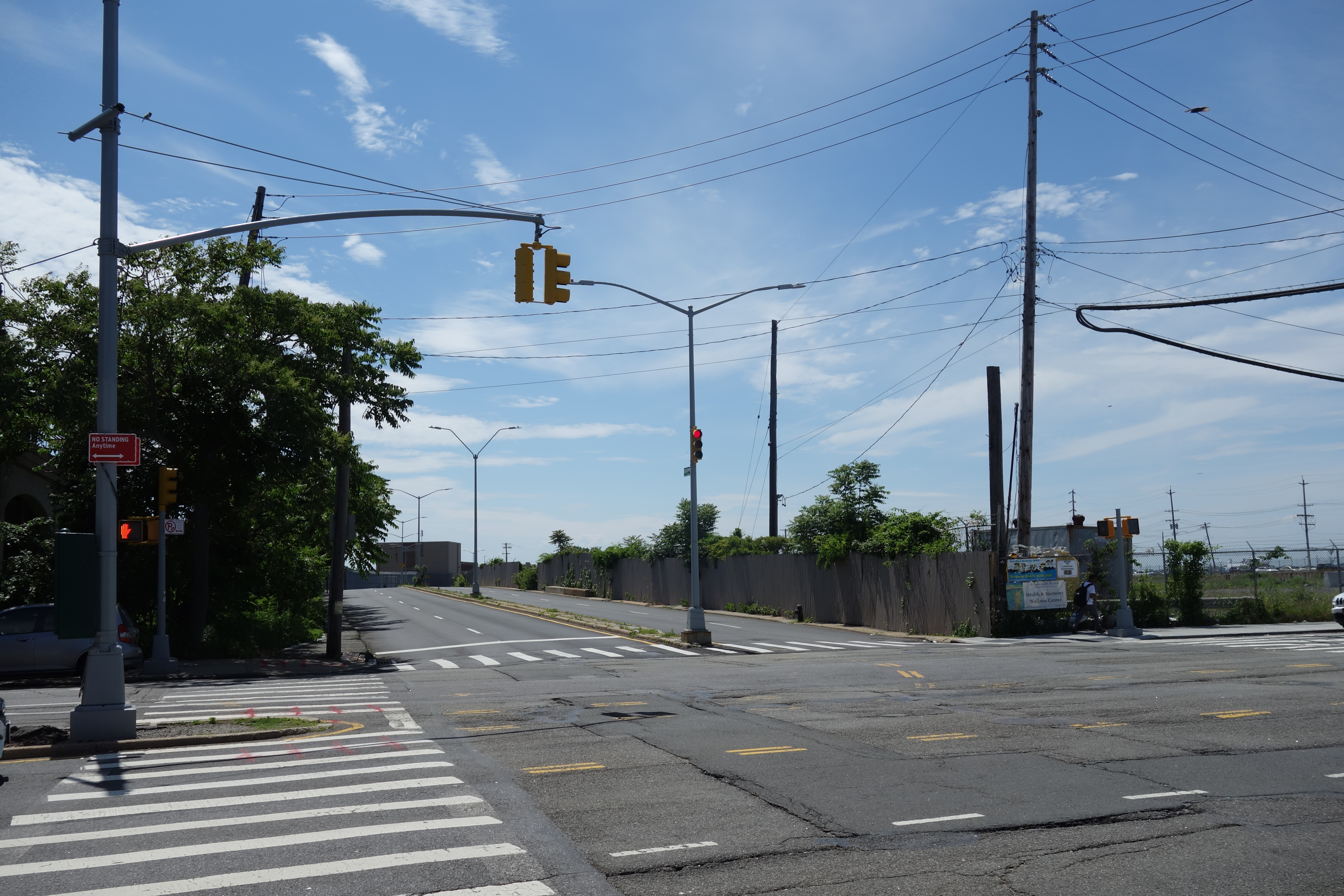
At Beach 108th Street

The Rockaway Freeway is a road in the New York City borough of Queens that was created from the old right-of-way of the Long Island Rail Road Rockaway Division in 1941–1942 as part of the project to eliminate grade crossings within New York City. The railroad line itself was elevated over the new automotive route and was incorporated into the New York City Subway system as the IND Rockaway Line (A train) in June 1956.

Because of the large number of concrete posts supporting the elevated subway, the Freeway has consistently been hazardous for drivers: at least one driver died from crashing into a pillar. A portion of the road, between Beach 67th Street and Beach 73rd Street, was closed permanently in 2009 to make way for a retail transit plaza in connection with the new Arverne-by-the-Sea construction development.
