= IND Rockaway Line =

New York City Subway line

- The IND Rockaway Line is served by the A and Rockaway Park Shuttle trains.

Overview
- Owner: City of New York
- Locale: Queens, New York City
- Termini: Aqueduct Racetrack; Rockaway Park–Beach 116th Street (Rockaway Park Branch); Far Rockaway–Mott Avenue (Far Rockaway Branch)
- Stations: 14

Service
- Type: Rapid transit
- System: New York City Subway
- Operator: New York City Transit Authority
- Daily ridership: 10,661 (Note: Ridership from Aqueduct Racetrack to Far Rockaway. Does not include the Rockaway Park section); 1,273 (Note: Ridership for Rockaway Park section only); 11,934 (Note: Total ridership for entire line and both branches)

History
- Opened: June 28, 1956; 70 years ago
- Last extension: 1958

Technical
- Num of tracks: 2–4
- Character: Elevated/Surface/Embankment
- Track gauge: 4 ft 8 1/2 in (1,435 mm) standard gauge

The IND Rockaway Line is a rapid transit line of the IND Division of the New York City Subway, operating in Queens. It branches from the IND Fulton Street Line at Rockaway Boulevard, extending over the Jamaica Bay, into the Rockaways. At its southern end in the Rockaways, the line has two branches: one traveling east to Far Rockaway–Mott Avenue and one traveling west to Rockaway Park–Beach 116th Street. The A train serves the line on the Far Rockaway branch, as well as on the section north of Hammels Wye (where the two branches merge). The Rockaway Park Shuttle runs between Broad Channel and Rockaway Park. Five rush hour A trains provide service between Rockaway Park and Manhattan in the peak direction.

The line was built in 1880 as the New York, Woodhaven and Rockaway Railroad. Incorporated in 1877, the line was built to better serve the beach resorts in the Rockaways, cutting travel times by 30 minutes over the existing South Side Railroad route. Long Island Rail Road (LIRR) trains began using the branch that year by operating over its Montauk Division. The railroad was sold to the LIRR in 1887, and trains using the branch began serving Far Rockaway via a new connection to the old Far Rockaway Branch. The line south of Woodhaven Junction was electrified in 1905. The wooden trestle through Jamaica Bay was subjected to numerous fires, which damaged it. A fire on May 7, 1950, cut service on the middle of the line, but as the LIRR was bankrupt, it did not seek to restore service on the line. Service to Far Rockaway and Rockaway Park ran through Valley Stream, while service on the Rockaway Beach Branch terminated at Hamilton Beach.

The line was then purchased by the New York City Board of Transportation in 1952, and the line south of Ozone Park was taken out of service in June 1955 to allow for the line's conversion to subway service. On June 26, 1956, the line opened for subway service. A connection was built between to the IND Fulton Street Line at Liberty Avenue using the old Fulton Street Elevated line to allow for its use by the subway, and the line then became the IND Rockaway Line.

== Extent and service ==
The following services use part or all of the IND Rockaway Line:

Service		Between					
	Time period	Aqueduct Racetrack and Broad Channel	Broad Channel and Beach 67th St	Beach 67th St and Far Rockaway	Broad Channel and Beach 90th St	Beach 90th St and Rockaway Park	Beach 67th St and Beach 90th St
"A" train	Rush peak	service	most trains		limited service		no service
"A" train	Other times	service	service		no service		no service
Rockaway Park Shuttle	All times	limited seasonal service	no service		service		no service

The north end of the Rockaway Line is a junction with the IND Fulton Street Line just east of Rockaway Boulevard. The line starts out as tracks F3 and F4 and descend from an elevated structure to the surface. Then the right-of-way widens to be four tracks wide. Trains in service going south then diverge from F3, and go onto F1. Trains coming from the Rockaways merge from track F2 onto track F4. South of this point, track F4 is out of service, and track F3 can only be used by work trains as it is de-energized. The line then continues as a four track line, and south of Howard Beach, the tracks merge into two tracks. The line then passes over Jamaica Bay just to the east of Cross Bay Boulevard, on its own private right-of-way. Then the line passes over the North Channel Swing Bridge. The crossing across Jamaica Bay between Howard Beach and Broad Channel is the longest distance between any two adjacent stations in the entire New York City Subway system.

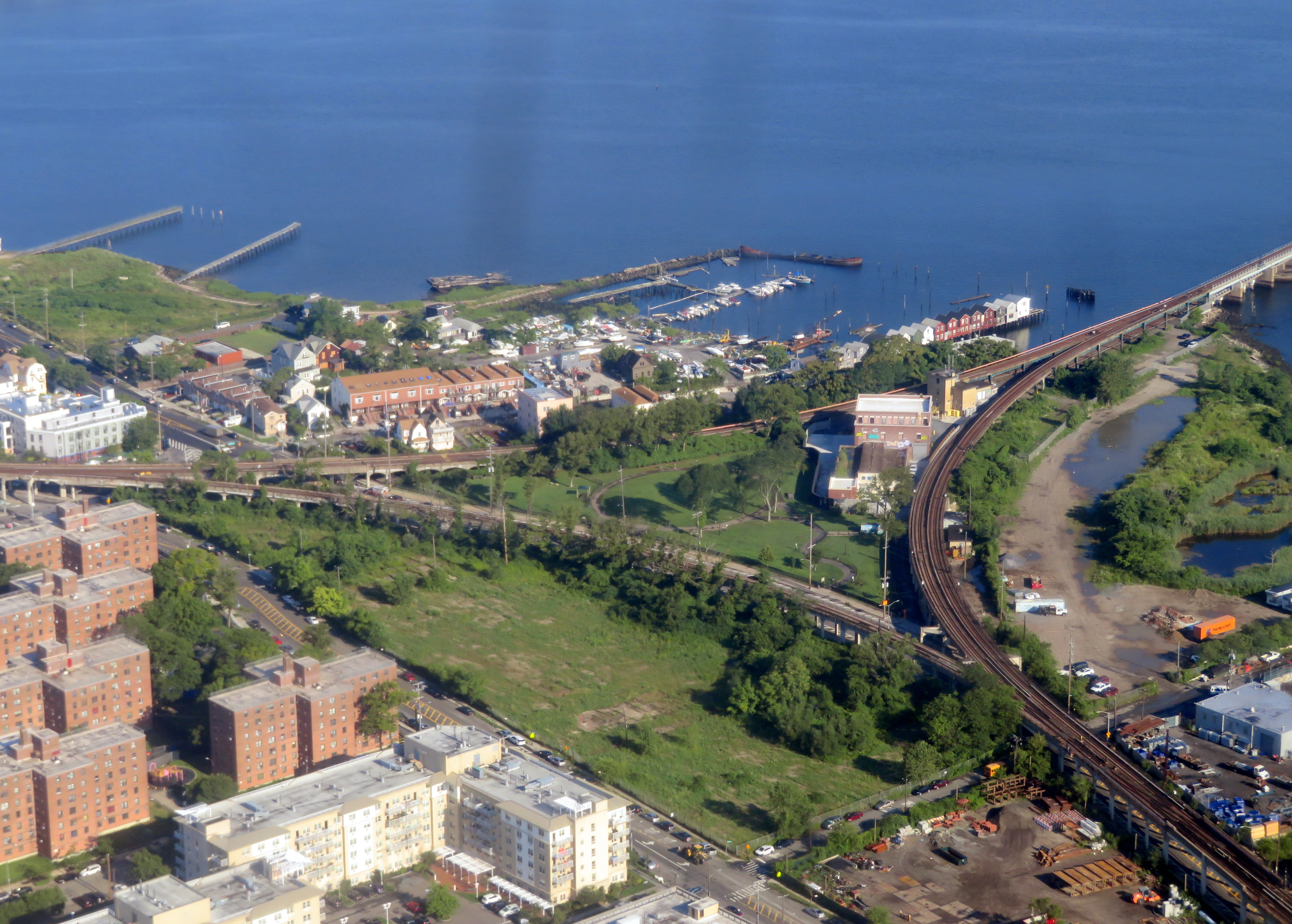
Aerial view of Hammels Wye

In 1997 to 1999, outer tracks were installed to the north of Broad Channel for between $5 million and $10 million. The track to the west of the original tracks, track F5, extends slightly less than two miles, or 10,300 feet (3,100 m), and is used for testing of equipment. The track to the east of the original tracks, track F6, is used for reversing trains on the Rockaway Park shuttle, and is approximately as long as a standard full length train. This track allows the shuttle to turn around significantly faster than it had been able to do before, when it was forced to relay at Howard Beach–JFK Airport or Euclid Avenue. South of the Broad Channel station is a fixed span leading to the small Subway Island, followed by the Beach Channel Drawbridge, which does open regularly and can cause delays to service when it is open for marine traffic.

South of the drawbridge is Hammels Wye, a three-legged junction with the respective Rockaway Park and Far Rockaway branches. The tracks from each branch connect to the tracks north of the wye with flying junctions. The Rockaway Park Branch turns to the west and the Far Rockaway Branch turns to the east. The third leg of the wye is a single track that connects the two branches together. This single track, track F6, is not currently used in revenue service. However, it was used as part of the Round Robin service that operated mostly during late nights between 1958 and 1988. It was also used for the temporary H service after Hurricane Sandy.

The Rockaway Park Branch, tracks F3 and F4, goes west via an elevated structure over the Rockaway Freeway before terminating at Rockaway Park–Beach 116th Street. Directly to the north of the station is a seven-track storage yard named Rockaway Park Yard. This yard stores the trains for the Rockaway Park Shuttle. To the south of the station is a single storage track. The Far Rockaway Branch, tracks F3A and F4A, goes east via an elevated structure over the Rockaway Freeway and terminates at a two-track terminal of Far Rockaway–Mott Avenue.

== History ==
=== Original railroad use ===
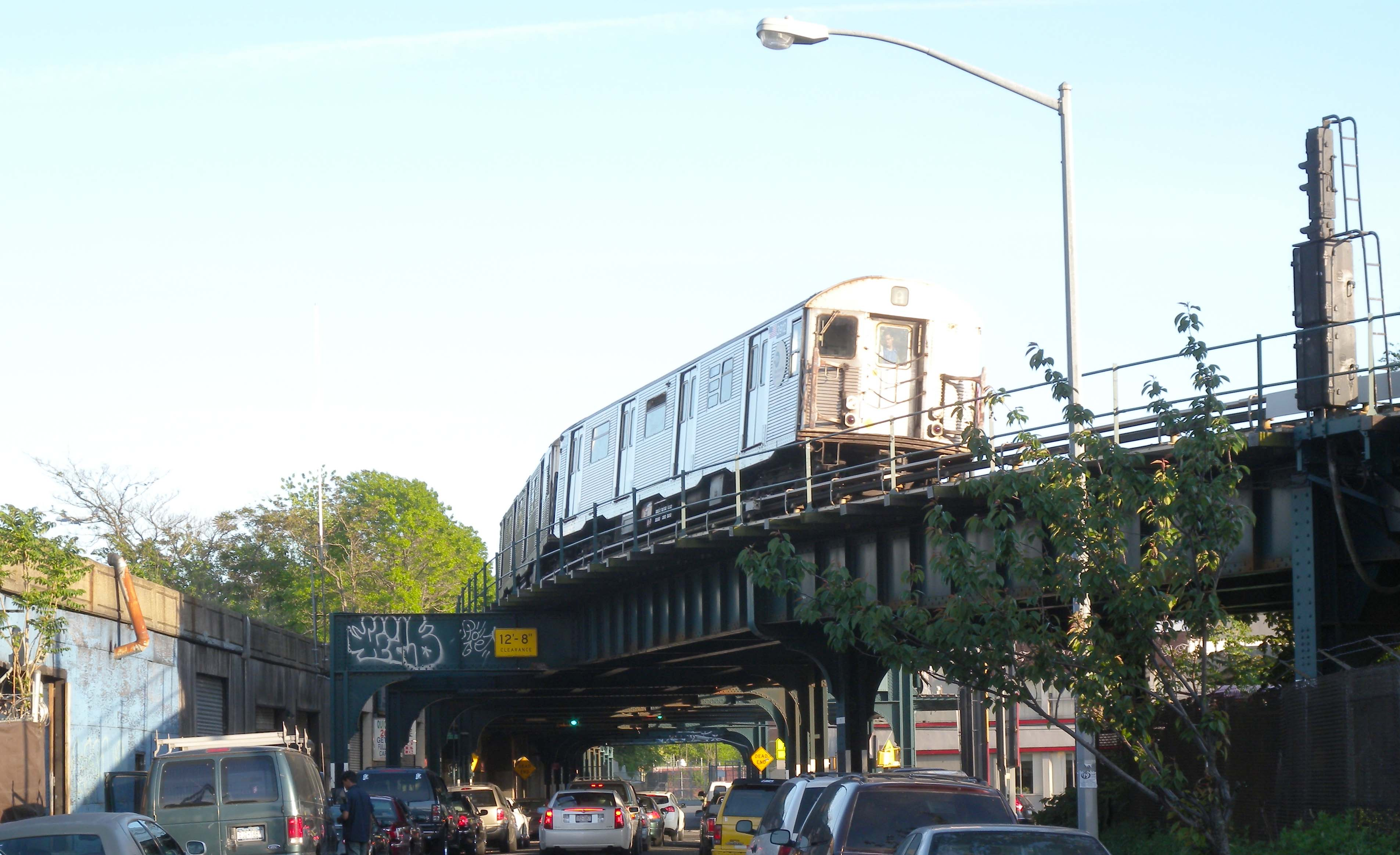
An A train made up of R32 cars turns from the IND Rockaway Line towards the IND Fulton Street Line.

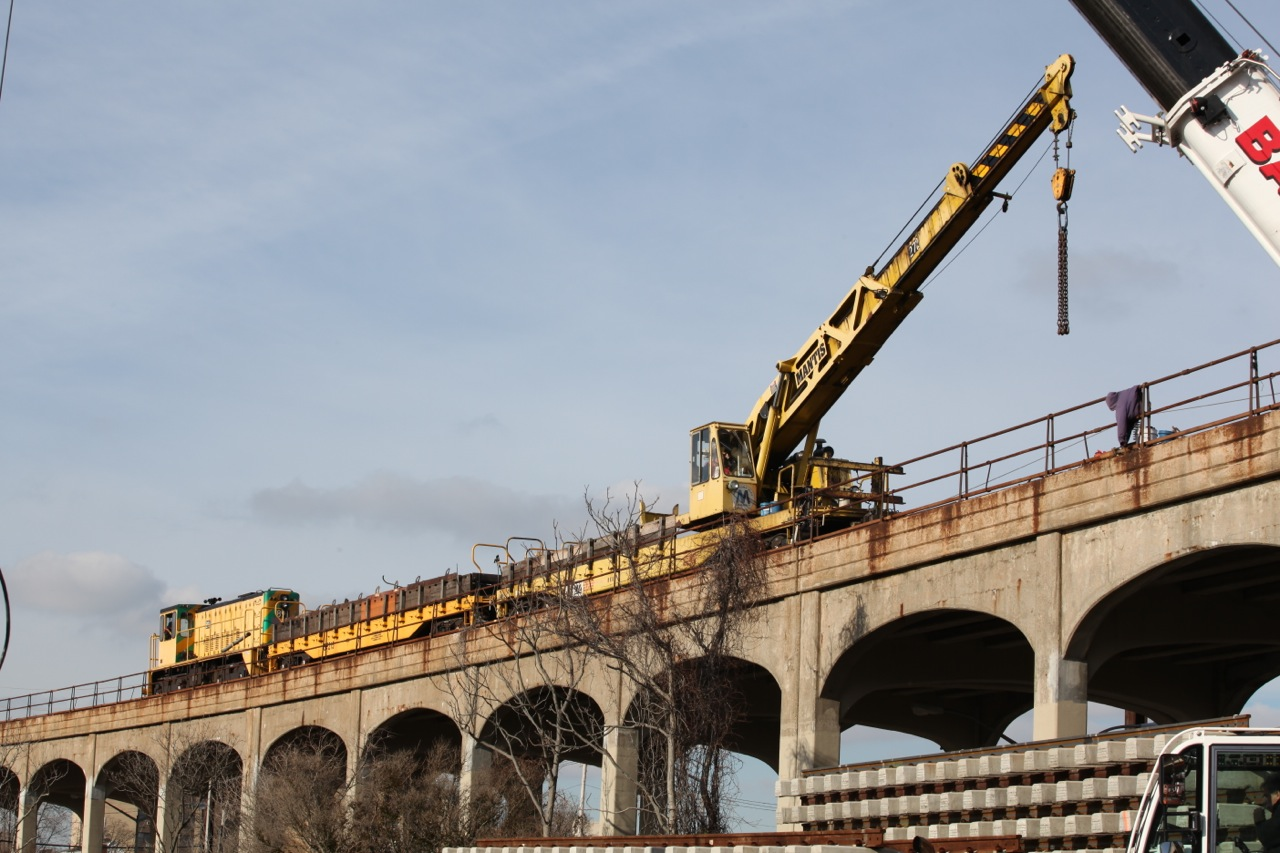
Construction work at Beach 60th Street

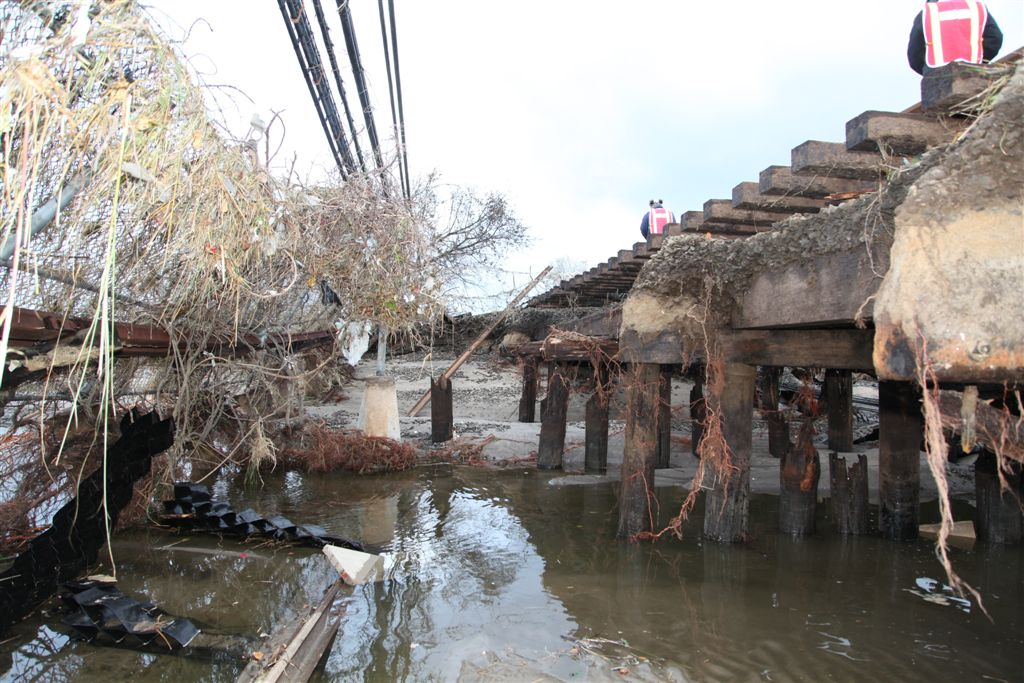
Washed out track support after Hurricane Sandy

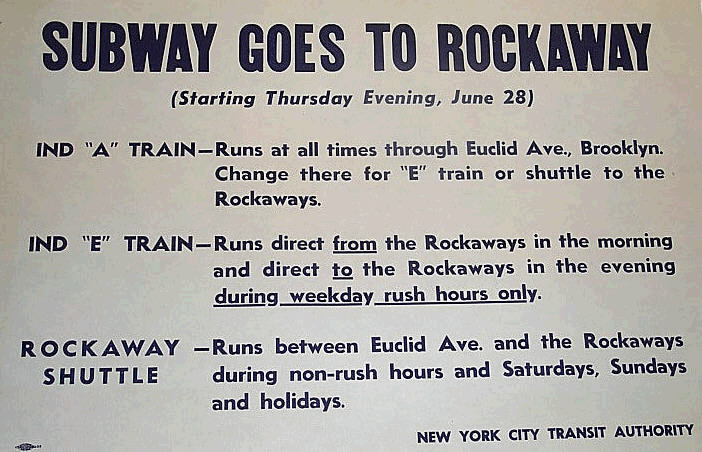
Subway Goes To Rockaway

Most of the Rockaway Line dates back to the 1880s when it was operated as the New York, Woodhaven and Rockaway Railroad; the Far Rockaway station had been in operation since 1869 as part of the South Side Railroad of Long Island. In 1892, the line first saw service by the Long Island Rail Road from its Atlantic Branch. In the late 1890s, the Brooklyn Elevated Railway (later the Brooklyn Rapid Transit Company) received permission to operate elevated trains from Brooklyn on the line for beach access. The city soon began eyeing the line as popularity soared. Additionally, the Ocean Electric Railway used part of the line as a connection between the Far Rockaway and Rockaway Beach Branches.

Plans for the New York City Subway to take over the Long Island Rail Road (LIRR)'s Rockaway branches were put forth as early as 1932.

The Long Island Rail Road's wooden trestle over Jamaica Bay often caught fire. A fire that started at 3:30 on a December night damaged 1,300 feet of the trestle. Service could not be resumed for several days because of a lack of available materials. Therefore, the railroad asked Green Bus Lines to provide service for passengers stranded at Broad Channel and The Raunt. Another took place at The Raunt on December 15, 1948, delaying trains between nine and nineteen minutes during the morning rush hour. 300 feet (91 m) of the trestle was destroyed during a July 4, 1949, fire, and morning rush hour service was delayed the following day. The worst fire, the one that sealed the fate of the line, took place on May 7, 1950. The fire burned all night and destroyed 1,800 feet (550 m) of the trestle between The Raunt and Broad Channel stations, and the estimated cost to repair it was $1 million. As a result, the LIRR deemed the line useless, and instead of repairing it, the LIRR decided to abandon the line in favor of their "land route" to Far Rockaway via Valley Stream in Nassau County.

=== Subway conversion ===
When the railroad made it clear that it was not planning to rebuild the line, the city bought the line on June 11, 1952, for $8.5 million. The LIRR needed the money for a major safety program, which cost $6 million. The New York City Board of Transportation, operators of the subway system, started preparing contracts for the reconstruction of the line right after the sale went through. In total, $47.5 million was spent to rebuild the line and to convert it for subway use, something they were planning to do as far back as the late 1920s. As part of the construction to convert the line to subway use, two new steel swing bridges were built to cross the North and South Channels, and two artificial islands were built using sand from Jamaica Bay to provide a roadbed for the subway trestle.

Work was completed right before the 1956 summer season, but the power supply was inadequate. Because of a strike, the delivery of substation equipment was delayed. Trains operated slowly across Jamaica Bay in order to conserve power. The newer R10s were intended to operate over the line, but because they required more power than the R1–9 fleet, the R1–9 fleet operated on the line instead. The line was incorporated into the Independent Subway System (IND) and connected to the IND Fulton Street Line. On June 28, 1956, service on the line began between Euclid Avenue and Rockaway Park at 6:38 PM and between Euclid Avenue and Wavecrest at 6:48 PM. Once the slow order was removed, the travel time from Euclid Avenue to Rockaway Park decreased from 40 to 28 minutes, and the travel time from Euclid Avenue to Wavecrest decreased from 44 to 32 minutes.

In September 1956, the New York City Transit Authority announced that the Rockaway revenues were disappointing, as $15,000 was expected to be made every day during the summer, while only $7,000 was made. As a result, there was a $750,000 deficit. On January 27, 1957, as a result of low ridership, service was reduced from running on eight minute headways to Broad Channel to twelve minute headways. Since service alternated between Rockaway Park and Wavecrest, stations had a train every 24 minutes. The line was built to handle 100,000 daily passengers but was only carrying 6,000. A new station at Far Rockaway–Mott Avenue opened on January 16, 1958, completing the Rockaway Line. The completion of the new terminal was delayed due to the slow delivery of steel.

=== Later years ===
The line charged a double fare south of Howard Beach which entailed the deposit of two tokens for those entering along the line or one token on exit for those arriving from other parts of the system. Passengers traveling only within the double-fare zone would request a special "refund ticket", entitling them to a refund upon exiting the system, either in cash or a token. The unpopular double fare was abolished on September 1, 1975, though it coincided with a system-wide fare increase, as well as an increase in tolls on the Marine Parkway–Gil Hodges Memorial Bridge and Cross Bay Veterans Memorial Bridge to the Rockaways.

In 1986, the New York City Transit Authority launched a study to determine whether to close 79 stations on 11 routes, including the segment of the Rockaway Line south of Howard Beach, due to low ridership and high repair costs. Numerous figures, including New York City Council member Carol Greitzer, criticized the plans.

A significant service improvement on the Rockaway Line took effect in 1993, when direct late-night service between Far Rockaway (but not Rockaway Park) and Brooklyn and Manhattan began; previously, only shuttle or Round Robin service was provided during these hours, with a transfer at Euclid Avenue (the Rockaway Park branch remains a shuttle at all times, with a transfer at Broad Channel, although additional direct rush hour service is provided by a limited number of A trains).

The segment of the line between Howard Beach and the Rockaway Peninsula suffered serious damage during Hurricane Sandy and was out of service for several months. On November 20, 2012, a free shuttle designated as H replaced the Rockaway portion of the A service between Far Rockaway–Mott Avenue and Beach 90th Street via the Hammels Wye. On May 30, 2013, full service was restored. In 2018, a two-phase program of flood mitigation work along the Hammels Wye required further service disruptions. The first phase, from April 9 to May 18, suspended rush-hour A trips to Rockaway Park. The second phase, from July 2 to September 3, diverted all Far Rockaway A trips to Rockaway Park. In both phases, the shuttle ran from Rockaway Park to Far Rockaway.

During weekends between Memorial Day and Labor Day in 2016 and 2017, weekend service on the Rockaway Park Shuttle was extended from Broad Channel to Rockaway Boulevard to allow passengers on both Lefferts Boulevard and Far Rockaway-bound A trains to transfer to the shuttle and shuttle passengers to transfer to more frequent Manhattan-bound A service at Rockaway Boulevard. Since then, the seasonal extension has occurred on an annual basis.

In 2022, the Metropolitan Transportation Authority (MTA) hired Schiavone to conduct repairs to the line. The next year, the MTA announced plans to reconstruct much of the Rockaway Line on the Rockaway peninsula. The first phase would entail repairing the South Channel Bridge and Hammels Wye structure. The project entailed demolishing and completely reconstructing about 1,600 feet (490 m) of viaduct. As a result, service between Howard Beach and the peninsula was suspended for 17 weeks starting January 17, 2025, and the shuttle ran fare-free between Rockaway Park and Far Rockaway. During the closure, there was shuttle bus service between Howard Beach and the Rockaways and all trips from the LIRR's Far Rockaway station to City Terminal Zone stations (and their corresponding return trips) were discounted to $2.75. The project included the installation of 12-foot-high (3.7 m) barriers flanking the tracks on Broad Channel; a new "debris shield" along the line; and the replacement of the South Channel Bridge and 1,500 feet (460 m) of tracks. Regular service resumed on May 19, 2025.

In 2024, as part of a program to upgrade the signaling of the New York City Subway, the MTA proposed installing communications-based train control (CBTC) on the Rockaway Line as part of its 2025–2029 Capital Program.

== Station listing ==
Station service legend
Stops all times	Stops 24 hours a day
Stops rush hours in the peak direction only	Stops during weekday rush hours in the peak direction only
Time period details
Disabled access	Station is compliant with the Americans with Disabilities Act
↑	Station is compliant with the Americans with Disabilities Act in the indicated direction only
↓	Station is compliant with the Americans with Disabilities Act in the indicated direction only
	Elevator access to mezzanine only

Neighborhood (approximate)	Disabled access	Station	Services	Opened	Transfers and notes
Ozone Park	splits from the IND Fulton Street Line (A )				
Ozone Park	↑	Aqueduct Racetrack	A (Northbound only)	September 14, 1959	Single side platform for northbound service only
Ozone Park		Aqueduct–North Conduit Avenue	A	June 28, 1956 (subway)	
Howard Beach	Disabled access	Howard Beach–JFK Airport	A	June 28, 1956 (subway)	Connection to AirTrain JFK
Broad Channel		Broad Channel	A S	June 28, 1956 (subway)	Q52/Q53 Select Bus Service
Hammels Wye splits to Far Rockaway Branch (A ) & Rockaway Park Branch (A S ) with a connecting track between the two branches (no regular service)
Far Rockaway Branch
Arverne	Disabled access	Beach 67th Street	A	June 28, 1956 (subway)	Q52 Select Bus Service
Arverne		Beach 60th Street	A	June 28, 1956 (subway)	Q52 Select Bus Service
Edgemere		Beach 44th Street	A	June 28, 1956 (subway)	
Edgemere		Beach 36th Street	A	June 28, 1956 (subway)	
Far Rockaway		Beach 25th Street	A	June 28, 1956 (subway)	
Far Rockaway	Disabled access	Far Rockaway–Mott Avenue	A	January 16, 1958 (subway)	
Rockaway Park Branch
Rockaway Beach		Beach 90th Street	A S	June 28, 1956 (subway)	Q52 Select Bus Service
Rockaway Beach		Beach 98th Street	A S	June 28, 1956 (subway)	Q53 Select Bus Service
Rockaway Park		Beach 105th Street	A S	June 28, 1956 (subway)	
Rockaway Park	Disabled access	Rockaway Park–Beach 116th Street	A S	June 28, 1956 (subway)	Q53 Select Bus Service
