= A (New York City Subway service) =

Rapid transit service

- Eighth Avenue Express

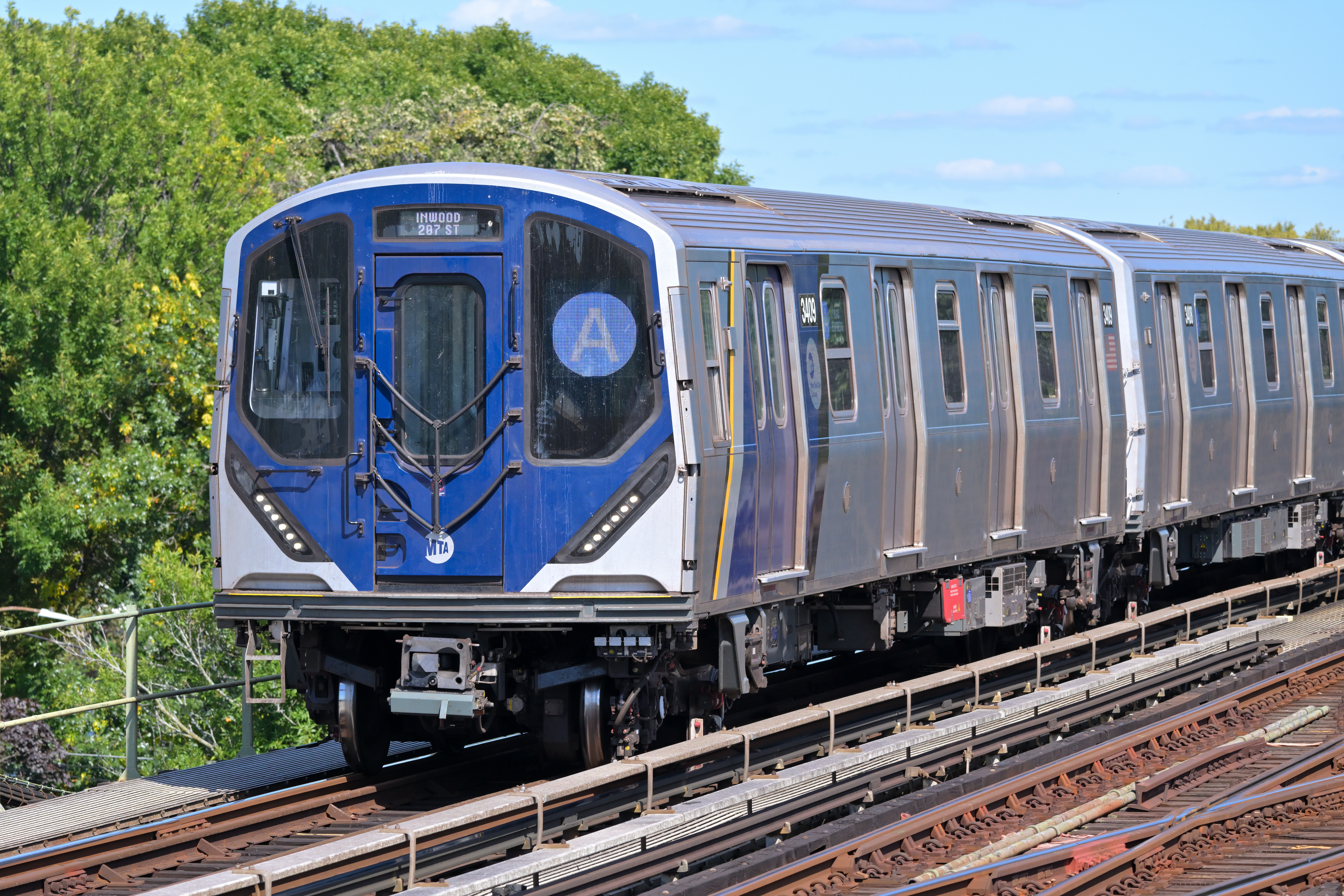
- A Manhattan-bound A train of R211As approaching 80th Street

- Northern end: Inwood–207th Street
- Southern end: Lefferts Boulevard, Far Rockaway, or Rockaway Park (limited rush-hour service)
- Stations: 40; 44 (rush hour services); 62 (late-night services)
- Rolling stock: R179; R211A (Rolling stock assignments subject to change)
- Depot: 207th Street Yard (R179); Pitkin Yard (R211A)
- Started service: September 10, 1932; 94 years ago

The A Eighth Avenue Express is a rapid transit service in the B Division of the New York City Subway. Its route emblem, or "bullet", is colored blue since it is a part of the IND Eighth Avenue Line in Manhattan.

The A operates 24 hours daily between 207th Street in Inwood, Manhattan and Mott Avenue in Far Rockaway, Queens. During daytime hours, alternate service operates to and from Lefferts Boulevard in South Ozone Park, Queens. During rush hours, five scheduled trips in the peak direction operate from Beach 116th Street in Rockaway Park, Queens to Manhattan in the morning and back from Manhattan in the afternoon. Daytime service makes express stops in Manhattan and Brooklyn and all stops in Queens. Overnight service operates only between 207th Street and Far Rockaway, making all stops along the full route; during this time, a shuttle train (the Lefferts Boulevard Shuttle) operates between Euclid Avenue and Lefferts Boulevard. (Note: The separate shuttle service is identified on the late night map as (gray A), and in the schedule and on trains as (blue S).)

The A provides the longest one-seat ride in the system—at 32.39 miles (52.13 km), between 207th Street and Far Rockaway—and a 2015 study indicated that it had a weekday ridership of 600,000.

== History ==
=== Early history ===
The A and AA were the first services on the IND Eighth Avenue Line when it opened on September 10, 1932. The Independent Subway System (IND) used single letters to refer to express services and double letters for local services. The A ran express between 207th Street and Chambers Street, and the AA ran local between 168th Street and Chambers Street, known at the time as Hudson Terminal. During late-night hours (from 1:45 a.m. to 5:45 a.m.) and on Sundays, the A did not run and the AA made all stops along the line.

The A was extended to Jay Street–Borough Hall when the Cranberry Street Tunnel to Brooklyn opened on February 1, 1933, and to Bergen Street, when the extension opened on March 20. On July 1, the A began running express at all times, stopping at 155th Street and 163rd Street during late nights. The A was extended to Church Avenue on October 7.

On April 9, 1936, the IND Fulton Street Line was opened to Rockaway Avenue. The 1936 extension played an integral part in the establishment of Bedford-Stuyvesant as Brooklyn's central African American community. The A train connected Harlem, Manhattan's central African American community, to areas of Bedford-Stuyvesant that provided residential opportunities for African Americans not found throughout the rest of New York City.

On December 30, 1946, and November 28, 1948, the line was extended to Broadway–East New York (now Broadway Junction) and Euclid Avenue, respectively. On October 24, 1949, express service in Brooklyn to Broadway–East New York began with the A running express during rush hours, with the E extended to provide local service.

=== Extensions to Ozone Park and the Rockaways ===
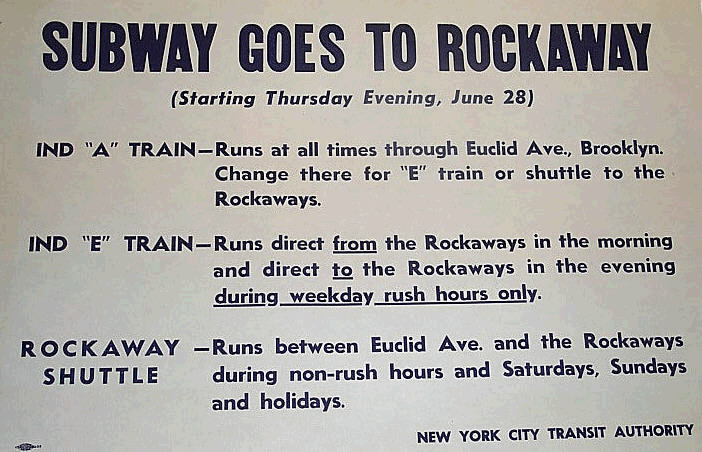
A poster commemorating the opening of the IND Rockaway Line.

On April 29, 1956, Grant Avenue was opened and the line was extended over the BMT Fulton Street Line to Lefferts Boulevard. On weekdays except midnights, alternate trains terminated at Lefferts Boulevard and at Euclid Avenue. During weekends, they terminated at Euclid Avenue with a shuttle to Lefferts Boulevard.

Two months later, on June 28, 1956, the former Long Island Rail Road Rockaway Beach Branch, having been rebuilt to subway specifications, began service to Rockaway Park and Wavecrest (Beach 25th Street). At this time, rush hour express service on the Fulton Street Line with the E train began.

On September 16, 1956, the A was extended to the Rockaways, replacing the E. At the time, alternate trains continued running to Lefferts Boulevard. On January 27, 1957, non-rush hour through service to the Rockaways was discontinued and was replaced by a shuttle running between Euclid Avenue and Wavecrest (now Beach 25th Street). Non-rush hour A train service was now to Lefferts Boulevard.

On June 18, 1957, the New York City Transit Authority (NYCTA) announced plans to have Rockaway-bound A trains skip Grant Avenue, Hudson Street, and Boyd Street during rush hours on a one-month pilot, to take effect July 1. The change was made to determine whether ten minutes could be reduced off of travel times to the Rockaways; the NYCTA only believed it would save three minutes. In the face of community opposition, the NYCTA announced that it would take more time to review the change, meaning that it ultimately did not take effect on July 1.

On January 16, 1958, with the opening of the new terminal Far Rockaway–Mott Avenue, rush hour A service was extended. On September 8, 1958, the E train replaced the A train in the Rockaways again, and A trains resumed alternating between Euclid Avenue and Lefferts Boulevard. "Round-robin" service from Euclid Avenue to both Rockaway terminals began during non-rush hours, while through A service ran to Lefferts Boulevard. On September 8, 1959, the A began to run local in Brooklyn during rush hours, making it local at all times in Brooklyn, as the E became express in Brooklyn during rush hours. On July 9, 1967, the A trains running to Euclid Avenue were extended to Far Rockaway middays, evenings, and weekends, replacing the HH shuttle on that branch.

=== Simplifying service patterns ===
As part of systemwide changes in bus and subway service, major changes were made to A service in Brooklyn and Queens on January 2, 1973. The A train became the express service along Fulton Street and the E train became the local during rush hours. Express service would be provided for a longer period during rush hours as the span of E service to Brooklyn, which would cover local stops, was also increased. In addition, the A trips that terminated at Euclid Avenue during rush hours were extended to Far Rockaway, replacing E service. Service would now run to Far Rockaway between 5:30 a.m. and 11:30 p.m. A trains would alternate between Lefferts Boulevard and Far Rockaway. These changes were initially supposed to take effect on September 11, 1972.

On August 30, 1976, the CC became the Fulton Street Local during rush hours, replacing E service. On August 27, 1977, the A began making local stops in Manhattan during late nights, when the AA was not running.

On December 11, 1988, A trains began running local between 145th Street and 168th Street on weekends to replace the discontinued K (formerly AA) service, and express on the IND Fulton Street Line in Brooklyn during middays and rush hours, with the C providing local service during those times. On September 30, 1990, A trains began operating local between 145th Street and 168th Street during weekday evenings.

In January 1991, a reduction of service along the Central Park West corridor to remove excess capacity was proposed. Initially, A service would operate local between 168th Street and Euclid Avenue during weekday rush hours and middays, with weekday evening and weekend daytime service extended beyond 168th Street to operate to and from Inwood–207th Street, and daily late night service extended beyond Euclid Avenue to operate to and from Far Rockaway–Mott Avenue in Queens. Express service between 168th Street and 59th Street–Columbus Circle would be replaced by D and rerouted Q trains, the latter of which would serve 207th Street during weekday rush hours and middays; express service below 34th Street–Penn Station in Manhattan and in Brooklyn would have been replaced by an expanded H service. A new shuttle would serve Lefferts Boulevard during late nights. The service change was later amended to retain the A as an express service in place of the altered Q service pattern and would be re-designated as an orange A, as it would be rerouted via the Sixth Avenue Line and its southern terminal moved to Brighton Beach, operating weekday rush hours and middays only. This service change would have been implemented in October 1991, pending approval from the MTA board.

In 1991, at a series of meetings, the NYCTA presented proposed changes to A, C, and H service that would shorten the length of the C, simplify the service pattern during late nights to most efficiently serve the majority of riders, provide direct express service to Rockaway Park during rush hours in the peak direction, and provide shuttle connections during non-peak periods between Rockaway Park and through A train service. The service pattern devised was designed to improve operations by reducing route length and complexity, making service more attractive, simplifying confusing service patterns, and reducing transfers for passengers traveling during late nights. At the time, A service ran to Lefferts Boulevard and Far Rockaway during the day while the C ran to Rockaway Park during rush hours. During late nights, A service ran to Lefferts Boulevard, while service to both branches in the Rockaways was provided by round-robin H shuttle service to Euclid Avenue. As part of the changes proposed, round-robin shuttle service would be discontinued; late-night A service would run from Manhattan through to Far Rockaway; and service to Lefferts Boulevard and Rockaway Park would be provided by separate shuttle services with timed transfers to through A service. Rush hour local C service to Rockaway Park would be replaced by through A express service that ran every 20 minutes in the peak direction for a period of one hour and twenty minutes in rush hours to and from 59th Street–Columbus Circle. The initial proposal had these trips terminate at 34th Street, but this was changed to 59th Street following public comments. These five rush hour express trips were marketed as a "commuter rail style service", and special efforts were to be made to follow the arrival and departure times listed in the route's timetable, which was publicly distributed to riders. In addition, H service to Rockaway Park would be replaced by the Rockaway Park Shuttle, which would run between Broad Channel and Rockaway Park, and C service would be truncated to Euclid Avenue.

In April 1992, the MTA Board approved the proposed change to service in the Rockaways, which were expected to encourage ridership growth in the long term, and reduced NYCTA's annual operating budget by $20,000. The changes took effect on October 25, 1992, with modification: Overnight shuttle service to Lefferts Boulevard would terminate at Euclid Avenue, not Rockaway Boulevard. In addition, the Rockaway Park trips would end at Dyckman Street during the morning rush hour and begin at 59th Street–Columbus Circle during the evening rush hour. Later on, the Rockaway Park trips were extended from 59th Street to Dyckman Street and 207th Street.

On May 29, 1994, A trains began running express on weekends from 7 a.m. to 11 p.m. between 168th Street and 145th Street, with C trains being extended from 145th Street to 168th Street to cover local stops. A corresponding change was made to weekday midday A service on April 30, 1995, though this change was discontinued on November 12, 1995. On March 1, 1998, A trains began running express between 168th Street and 145th Street during middays and early evenings, with local service provided by extended C service.

On May 1, 1999, the A became the express on the Fulton Street Line every day during daytime hours, and C service was extended from World Trade Center to Euclid Avenue during late weekday evenings and weekends to provide local service along the line. This service change was made due to construction taking place on the Williamsburg Bridge, which prohibited the J, M and Z from entering Manhattan; as a result, service on the A, as well as the C and L, were increased. This service change to the A was made permanent after the Williamsburg Bridge reopened to J, M and Z trains.

=== 21st century ===
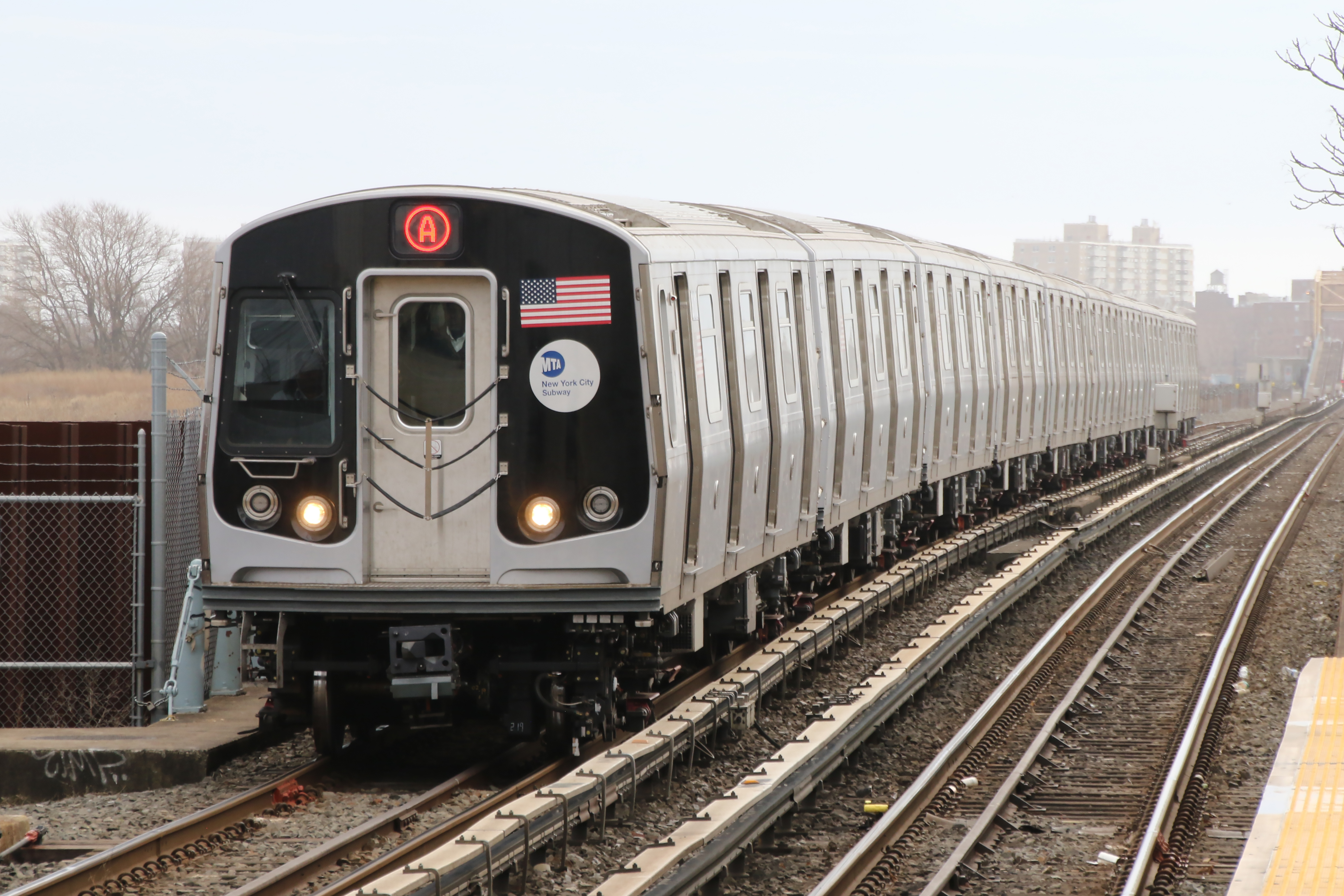
Manhattan-bound R179 A train arriving at Broad Channel

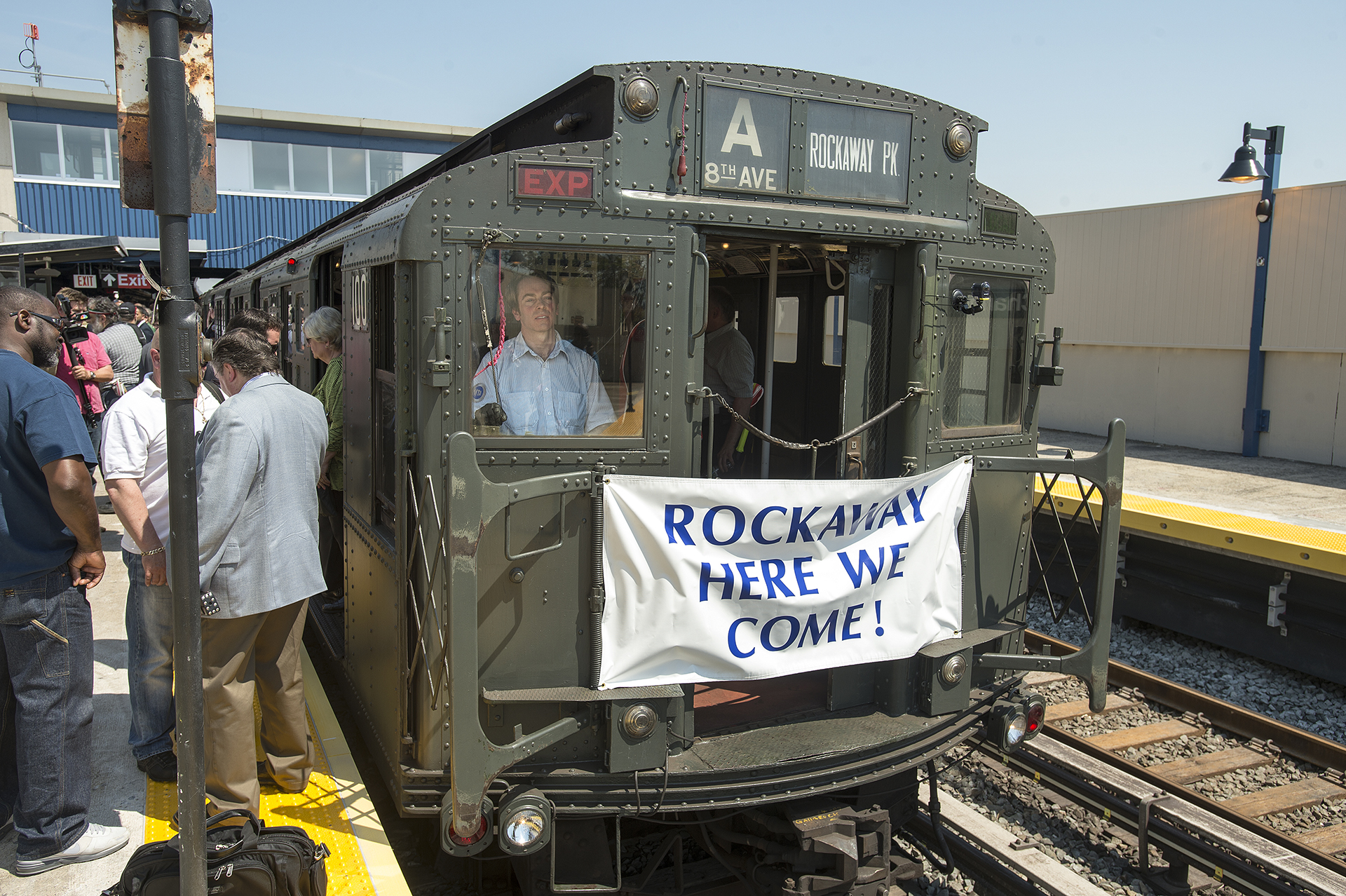
An R1-led nostalgia train celebrates the return of service to Far Rockaway in May 2013, after Hurricane Sandy damage was repaired.

C service was suspended from January 29 to February 14, 2000 due to switch replacement work north of the World Trade Center station, preventing it from being used as a terminal for E trains. As a result, A trains made all stops between 168th and 145th Streets during weekday daytime hours, and made all stops between 145th and 59th Streets during weekday evening hours.

After the September 11, 2001 attacks, A service was rerouted between West Fourth and Jay Streets, making F stops and operating via the Rutgers Street Tunnel. On September 17, normal A service was restored, but trains bypassed Chambers Street until October 5.

On January 23, 2005, a fire at the Chambers Street signal room crippled A and C service. Initial assessments suggested that it would take several years to restore normal service, but the damaged equipment was replaced with available spare parts, and normal service resumed on April 21.

A service was affected by Hurricane Sandy in October 2012, due to extreme damage to the IND Rockaway Line. Trains that normally traveled to Far Rockaway or Rockaway Park terminated at Howard Beach–JFK Airport. Service to the Rockaways resumed on May 30, 2013. The Far Rockaway part of the route was served by the temporary free H shuttle that ran between Far Rockaway and Beach 90th Street via the connecting track at Hammels Wye.

As a result of a two-phase program of flood mitigation work along the Hammels Wye, between April 9 and May 18, 2018, limited rush hour A service to/from Rockaway Park was suspended. (Note: Limited rush-hour service that normally begins or ends at Rockaway Park began or ended at Euclid Avenue instead.) The second phase, from July 1 to September 3, diverted all Far Rockaway-bound A trips to Rockaway Park, with Rockaway Park Shuttle trains being rerouted to the Far Rockaway branch through the southern leg of Hammels Wye.

From midday on March 29, 2020 to April 28, 2020, due to the suspension of C train service caused by the COVID-19 pandemic, A trains to Lefferts Boulevard ran local, while A trains to the Rockaways ran express. As part of a program to repair the South Channel Bridge, service between Howard Beach and the peninsula was suspended for 17 weeks starting on January 17, 2025, and the Rockaway branches were instead served by a rerouted Rockaway Park Shuttle. Regular service resumed on May 19, 2025.

== Route ==
=== Signage history ===
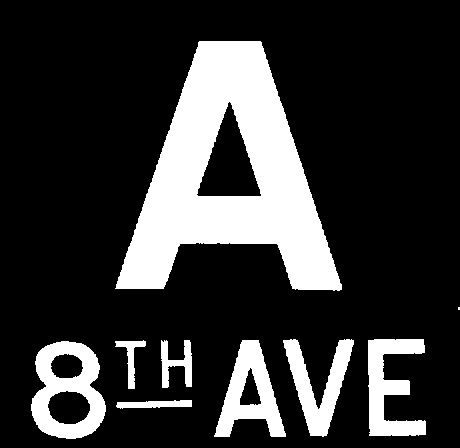
Pre-1967 bullet used on the R1s to R38s

1967-1979 bullet

1979-1987 bullet

1992-2015 Rush hour bullet

Proposed 1993 bullet for the IND Sixth Avenue Line

The bullet used since 1987

The late night shuttle bullet used since 2012

=== Service pattern ===
The following table shows the lines used by the A, with shaded boxes indicating the route at the specified times: (Note: There are several local A trains each late evening and early mornings which travel to and from Lefferts Boulevard.)

| Line | From | To | Tracks | Times | | | | |
| Line | From | To | Tracks | Lefferts Blvd. service | | Rockaway Line service | | |
| Line | From | To | Tracks | all ex. nights | late nights | all ex. nights | late nights | rush peak |
|---|---|---|---|---|---|---|---|---|
| IND Eighth Avenue Line (full line) | Inwood–207th Street | 168th Street | all | | | | | |
| IND Eighth Avenue Line (full line) | 163rd Street–Amsterdam Avenue | Canal Street | express | | | | | |
| IND Eighth Avenue Line (full line) | 163rd Street–Amsterdam Avenue | Canal Street | local | | | | | |
| IND Eighth Avenue Line (full line) | Chambers Street | High Street | all | | | | | |
| IND Fulton Street Line (full line) | Jay Street–MetroTech | Shepherd Avenue | express | | | | | |
| IND Fulton Street Line (full line) | Jay Street–MetroTech | Shepherd Avenue | local | | | | | |
| IND Fulton Street Line (full line) | Euclid Avenue | | all | | | | | |
| IND Fulton Street Line (full line) | Grant Avenue | Rockaway Boulevard | local | | | | | |
| IND Fulton Street Line (full line) | 104th Street | Ozone Park–Lefferts Boulevard | local | | | | | |
| IND Rockaway Line (full line) | Aqueduct Racetrack | Howard Beach–JFK Airport | local | | | | | |
| IND Rockaway Line (full line) | Broad Channel | | all | | | | | |
| IND Rockaway Line (full line) | Beach 67th Street | Far Rockaway–Mott Avenue | all | | | | | Most trains |
| IND Rockaway Line (full line) | Beach 90th Street | Rockaway Park–Beach 116th Street | all | | | | | Limited service |

=== Stations ===
For a more detailed station listing, see the articles on the lines listed above.

For clarity, the A's branches are shown separately in the following table. The leftmost column shows the Lefferts Boulevard service; the second column shows the Far Rockaway service; and the third column shows the Rockaway Park service.

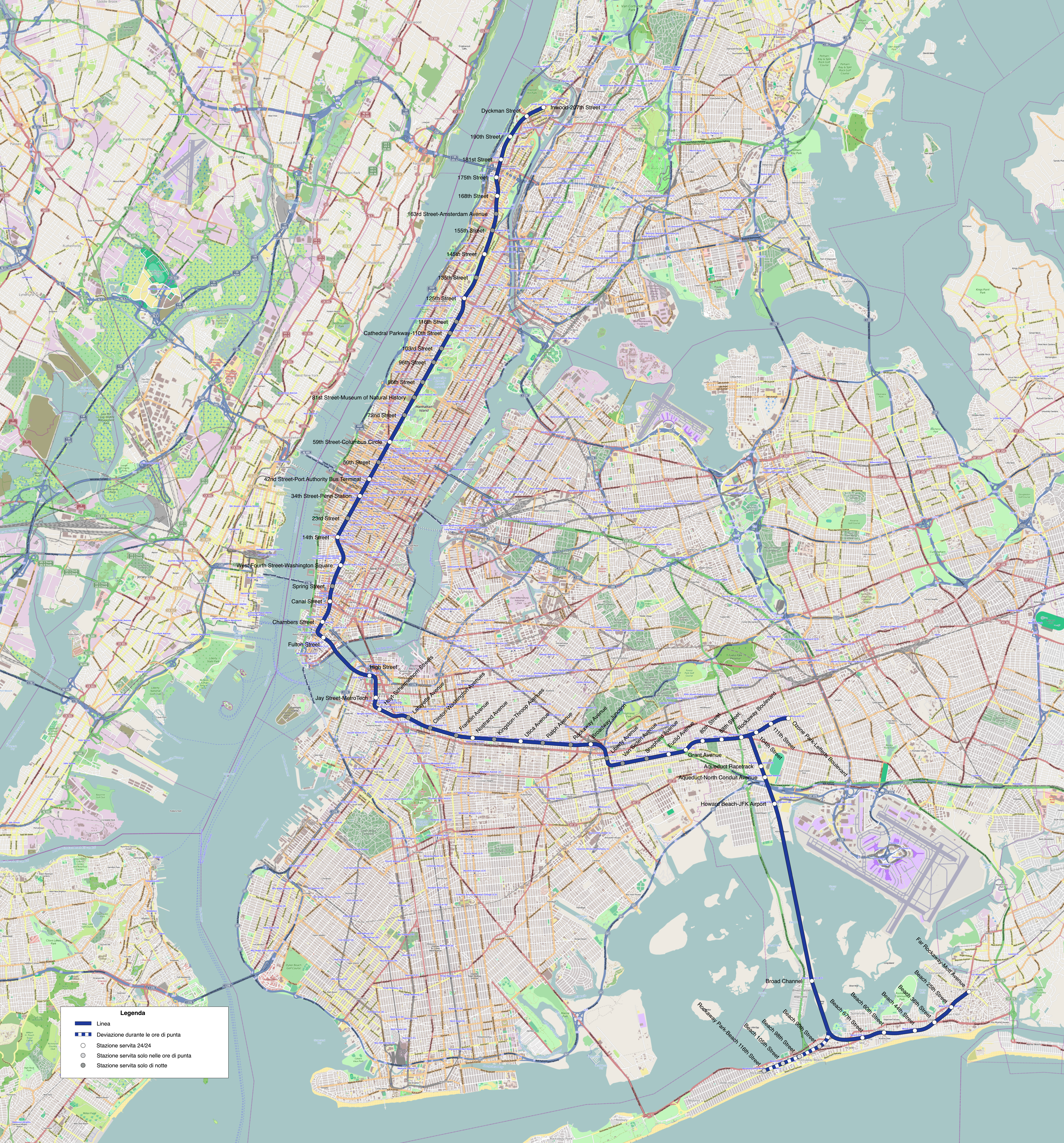
To scale line map

Station service legend
| Stops all times | Stops 24 hours a day |
| Stops all times except late nights | Stops every day during daytime hours only |
| Stops late nights only | Stops every day during overnight hours only |
| Stops weekdays during the day | Stops during weekday daytime hours only |
| Station closed | Station closed |
| Stops rush hours only | Stops rush hours only (limited service) |
| Stops rush hours in the peak direction only | Stops rush hours/weekdays in the peak direction only |
Time period details
| Disabled access | Station is compliant with the Americans with Disabilities Act |
| ↑ | Station is compliant with the Americans with Disabilities Act in the indicated direction only |
| ↓ | Station is compliant with the Americans with Disabilities Act in the indicated direction only |
| | Elevator access to mezzanine only |

| Lef. | FR | RP | Stations | Disabled access | Subway transfers | Connections/Other Notes |
|---|---|---|---|---|---|---|
Manhattan
Eighth Avenue Line
| Stops all times except late nights | Stops all times | ↑ (Note: Northbound trains from Rockaway Park end at 207th Street, but southbound trains to Rockaway Park begin at either Dyckman or 168th Streets) | Inwood–207th Street | Disabled access | | Bx12 Select Bus Service; All northbound a.m. rush hour trains from Rockaway Park terminate at this station |
| Stops all times except late nights | Stops all times | Stops rush hours in the peak direction only | Dyckman Street | | | Some peak-direction rush hour trips to/from Brooklyn and Queens begin or end their runs at this station (Note: Trains terminate at this station during the a.m. rush and originate at this station during the p.m. rush) |
| Stops all times except late nights | Stops all times | Stops rush hours in the peak direction only | 190th Street | Elevator access to mezzanine only | | |
| Stops all times except late nights | Stops all times | Stops rush hours in the peak direction only | 181st Street | Disabled access | | |
| Stops all times except late nights | Stops all times | Stops rush hours in the peak direction only | 175th Street | Disabled access | | George Washington Bridge Bus Station |
| Stops all times except late nights | Stops all times | Stops rush hours in the peak direction only | 168th Street | Disabled access | C 1 (IRT Broadway–Seventh Avenue Line) | Some peak-direction rush hour trips to/from Brooklyn and Queens begin or end their runs at this station |
| | | Stops late nights only | | | 163rd Street–Amsterdam Avenue | | | |
| | | Stops late nights only | | | 155th Street | | | Bx6 Select Bus Service |
| Stops all times except late nights | Stops all times | Stops rush hours in the peak direction only | 145th Street | | C B D (IND Concourse Line) | |
| | | Stops late nights only | | | 135th Street | | | |
| Stops all times except late nights | Stops all times | Stops rush hours in the peak direction only | 125th Street | Disabled access | B C D | M60 Select Bus Service to LaGuardia Airport |
| | | Stops late nights only | | | 116th Street | | | |
| | | Stops late nights only | | | Cathedral Parkway–110th Street | | | |
| | | Stops late nights only | | | 103rd Street | | | |
| | | Stops late nights only | | | 96th Street | | | |
| | | Stops late nights only | | | 86th Street | | | M86 Select Bus Service |
| | | Stops late nights only | | | 81st Street–Museum of Natural History | | | M79 Select Bus Service |
| | | Stops late nights only | | | 72nd Street | | | |
| Stops all times except late nights | Stops all times | Stops rush hours in the peak direction only | 59th Street–Columbus Circle | Disabled access | B C D 1 2 (IRT Broadway–Seventh Avenue Line) | |
| | | Stops late nights only | | | 50th Street | ↓ | E (IND Queens Boulevard Line) | Station is ADA-accessible in the southbound direction only. |
| Stops all times except late nights | Stops all times | Stops rush hours in the peak direction only | 42nd Street–Port Authority Bus Terminal | Disabled access | C E 1 2 3 (IRT Broadway–Seventh Avenue Line); 7 <7> (IRT Flushing Line); N Q R W (BMT Broadway Line); S (42nd Street Shuttle) at Times Square–42nd Street; B D F <F> M (IND Sixth Avenue Line at 42nd Street–Bryant Park, daytime only) | Port Authority Bus Terminal; M34A Select Bus Service |
| Stops all times except late nights | Stops all times | Stops rush hours in the peak direction only | 34th Street–Penn Station | Disabled access | C E | M34/M34A Select Bus Service; Amtrak, LIRR, NJ Transit at Pennsylvania Station |
| | | Stops late nights only | | | 23rd Street | | E | M23 Select Bus Service |
| Stops all times except late nights | Stops all times | Stops rush hours in the peak direction only | 14th Street | Disabled access | C E L (BMT Canarsie Line at Eighth Avenue) | M14A/D Select Bus Service |
| Stops all times except late nights | Stops all times | Stops rush hours in the peak direction only | West Fourth Street–Washington Square | Disabled access | C E B D F <F> M (IND Sixth Avenue Line) | PATH at Ninth Street |
| | | Stops late nights only | | | Spring Street | ↓ | E | Station is ADA-accessible in the southbound direction only. |
| Stops all times except late nights | Stops all times | Stops rush hours in the peak direction only | Canal Street | | C E | |
| Stops all times except late nights | Stops all times | Stops rush hours in the peak direction only | Chambers Street | Elevator access to mezzanine only | C E (at World Trade Center) (Note: Chambers Street–World Trade Center are actually counted as two separate stations by the MTA. E trains terminate at World Trade Center while A and C trains have through service at Chambers Street.); 2 3 (IRT Broadway–Seventh Avenue Line at Park Place); N R W (BMT Broadway Line at Cortlandt Street) | PATH at World Trade Center |
| Stops all times except late nights | Stops all times | Stops rush hours in the peak direction only | Fulton Street | Disabled access | C 2 3 (IRT Broadway–Seventh Avenue Line); 4 5 (IRT Lexington Avenue Line); J Z (BMT Nassau Street Line) | PATH at World Trade Center |
Brooklyn
| Stops all times except late nights | Stops all times | Stops rush hours in the peak direction only | High Street | | C | NYC Ferry: East River and South Brooklyn routes (at Old Fulton Street and Furman Street) |
Fulton Street Line
| Stops all times except late nights | Stops all times | Stops rush hours in the peak direction only | Jay Street–MetroTech | Disabled access | C F <F> N R W (BMT Fourth Avenue Line) | |
| Stops all times except late nights | Stops all times | Stops rush hours in the peak direction only | Hoyt–Schermerhorn Streets | Elevator access to mezzanine only | C G (IND Crosstown Line) | |
| | | Stops late nights only | | | Lafayette Avenue | | | |
| | | Stops late nights only | | | Clinton–Washington Avenues | | | |
| | | Stops late nights only | | | Franklin Avenue | Disabled access | S (BMT Franklin Avenue Line) | |
| Stops all times except late nights | Stops all times | Stops rush hours in the peak direction only | Nostrand Avenue | | C | B44 Select Bus Service, LIRR Atlantic Branch at Nostrand Avenue |
| | | Stops late nights only | | | Kingston–Throop Avenues | | | B15 bus to JFK Int'l Airport |
| Stops all times except late nights | Stops all times | Stops rush hours in the peak direction only | Utica Avenue | Disabled access | C | B46 Select Bus Service |
| | | Stops late nights only | | | Ralph Avenue | | | |
| | | Stops late nights only | | | Rockaway Avenue | | | |
| Stops all times except late nights | Stops all times | Stops rush hours in the peak direction only | Broadway Junction | | C J Z (BMT Jamaica Line); L (BMT Canarsie Line) | |
| | | Stops late nights only | | | Liberty Avenue | | | |
| | | Stops late nights only | | | Van Siclen Avenue | | | |
| | | Stops late nights only | | | Shepherd Avenue | | | |
| Stops all times | Stops all times | Stops rush hours in the peak direction only | Euclid Avenue | Disabled access | C | Northern terminal for the late night Lefferts Boulevard Shuttle, one evening trip from Far Rockaway, and three morning trips to Far Rockaway. |
| Stops all times | Stops all times | Stops rush hours in the peak direction only | Grant Avenue | | | |
Queens
| Stops all times | Stops all times | Stops rush hours in the peak direction only | 80th Street | | | |
| Stops all times | Stops all times | Stops rush hours in the peak direction only | 88th Street | | | |
| Stops all times | Stops all times | Stops rush hours in the peak direction only | Rockaway Boulevard | Disabled access | | Q52/Q53 Select Bus Service |
Services to Lefferts Boulevard and The Rockaways split
Fulton Street Line
| Stops all times | —N/a | —N/a | 104th Street | | | |
| Stops all times | —N/a | —N/a | 111th Street | | | |
| Stops all times | —N/a | —N/a | Ozone Park–Lefferts Boulevard | Disabled access | | Q10 and Q80 buses to JFK Airport |
Rockaway Line
| —N/a | ↑ | ↑ | Aqueduct Racetrack | ↑ | | Station serves northbound trains only |
| —N/a | Stops all times | Stops rush hours in the peak direction only | Aqueduct–North Conduit Avenue | | | |
| —N/a | Stops all times | Stops rush hours in the peak direction only | Howard Beach–JFK Airport | Disabled access | | AirTrain JFK |
| —N/a | Stops all times | Stops rush hours in the peak direction only | Broad Channel | | S (Rockaway Park Shuttle) | Q52/Q53 Select Bus Service |
Services to Far Rockaway and Rockaway Park split
Far Rockaway Branch
| —N/a | Stops all times | —N/a | Beach 67th Street | Disabled access | | Q52 Select Bus Service |
| —N/a | Stops all times | —N/a | Beach 60th Street | | | Q52 Select Bus Service |
| —N/a | Stops all times | —N/a | Beach 44th Street | | | |
| —N/a | Stops all times | —N/a | Beach 36th Street | | | |
| —N/a | Stops all times | —N/a | Beach 25th Street | | | |
| —N/a | Stops all times | —N/a | Far Rockaway–Mott Avenue | Disabled access | | LIRR Far Rockaway Branch at Far Rockaway |
Rockaway Park Branch (rush hour service only)
| —N/a | —N/a | Stops rush hours in the peak direction only | Beach 90th Street | | S (Rockaway Park Shuttle) | Q52 Select Bus Service |
| —N/a | —N/a | Stops rush hours in the peak direction only | Beach 98th Street | | S (Rockaway Park Shuttle) | Q53 Select Bus Service |
| —N/a | —N/a | Stops rush hours in the peak direction only | Beach 105th Street | | S (Rockaway Park Shuttle) | Q53 Select Bus Service |
| —N/a | —N/a | Stops rush hours in the peak direction only | Rockaway Park–Beach 116th Street | Disabled access | S (Rockaway Park Shuttle) | Q53 Select Bus Service; NYC Ferry: East River and South Brooklyn routes (on Beach Channel Drive and Beach 108th Street) |

== In popular culture ==
"Take the 'A' Train" is a jazz standard by Billy Strayhorn, referring to the A train, going at that time from eastern Brooklyn up into Harlem and northern Manhattan. It became the signature tune of Duke Ellington and often opened the shows of Ella Fitzgerald. The A train is mentioned by Azealia Banks in her song "212".
