= Rockaway Park–Beach 116th Street station =

New York City Subway station in Queens

Rockaway Park–Beach 116 Street
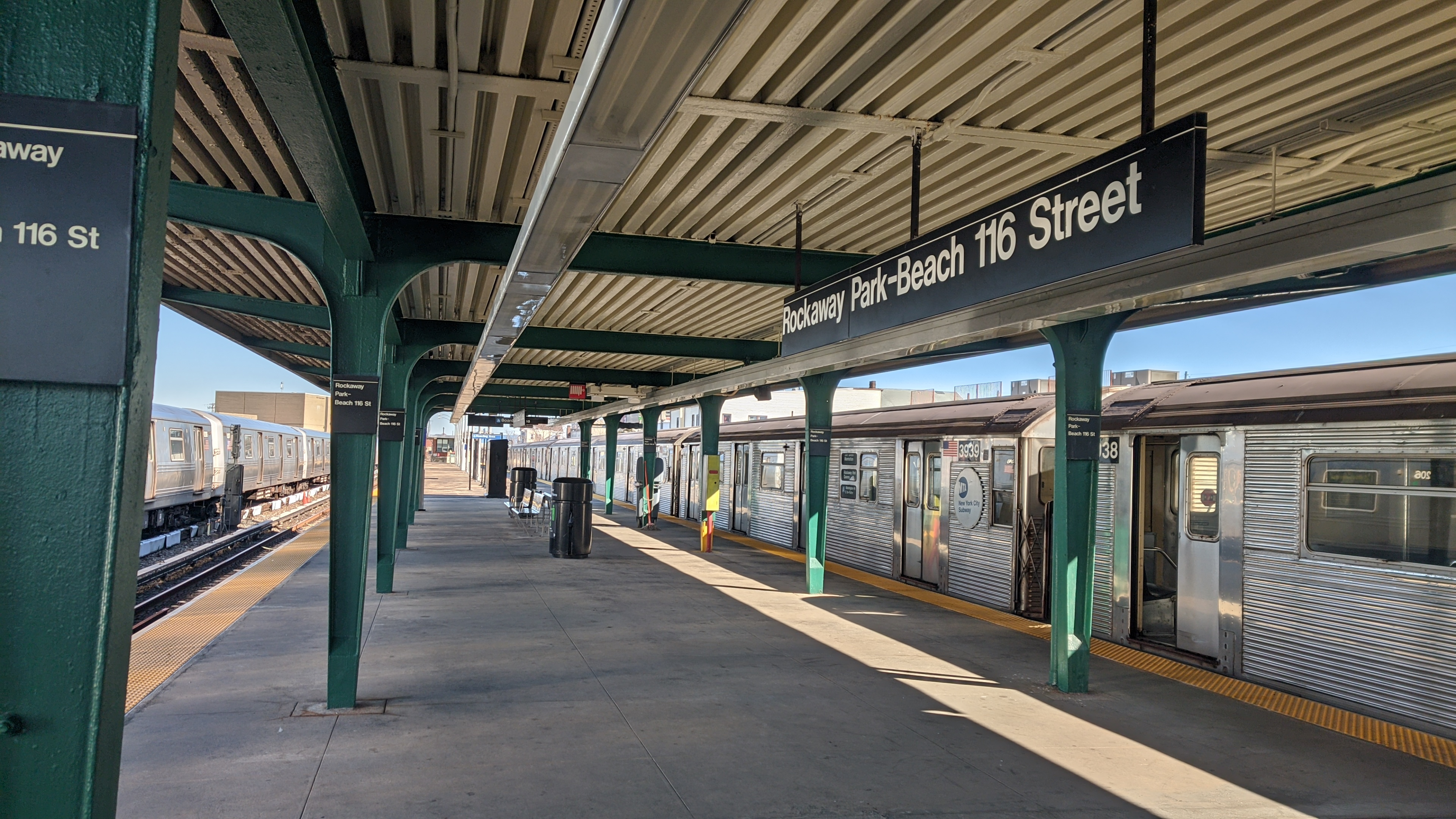
- Platform view looking east

Station statistics
- Address: Beach 116th Street between Rockaway Beach Boulevard & Newport Avenue; Queens, New York
- Borough: Queens
- Locale: Rockaway Park
- Coordinates: 40.580725°N 73.83618°W
- Division: B (IND, formerly LIRR Rockaway Beach Branch)
- Line: IND Rockaway Line
- Services: A (rush hours, peak direction); S (all times)
- Transit: MTA Bus: Q22, Q35, Q53 SBS, QM16; NYC Ferry: Rockaway (at Rockaway Landing)
- Structure: At-grade
- Platforms: 1 island platform
- Tracks: 2 (excludes 8 yard tracks adjacent to the station)

Other information
- Opened: May 1882; 144 years ago (LIRR station)
- Rebuilt: June 28, 1956; 70 years ago (as a Subway station)
- Accessible: Yes

Traffic
- 2025: 106,664 ▼24.8%
- Rank: 418 out of 423
Services
Preceding station	New York City Subway	Following station
Terminus	Rockaway Park	Beach 105th Street A S toward Broad Channel
Former services
Preceding station	Long Island Rail Road	Following station
Seaside toward Woodside	Rockaway Beach Division	Terminus
Preceding station	Brooklyn Rapid Transit	Following station
Seaside toward Chambers Street	Union Elevated Broadway Line 1898–1917	Terminus
Seaside toward Park Row	Union Elevated Fifth Avenue Line 1899–1905	Terminus
Location
Location within New York City Subway
Location within New York City
Location within New York
Track layout
Street map
Station service legend
Symbol	Description
Stops all times	Stops all times
Stops rush hours in the peak direction only	Stops rush hours in the peak direction only

The Rockaway Park–Beach 116th Street station is the western terminal station on the IND Rockaway Line of the New York City Subway, located on Beach 116th Street near Rockaway Beach Boulevard in Rockaway Beach, Queens. It is served by the Rockaway Park Shuttle at all times and ten daily rush-hour only A trains. There is also a New York City Police Department (NYPD) transit precinct at the station.

== History ==
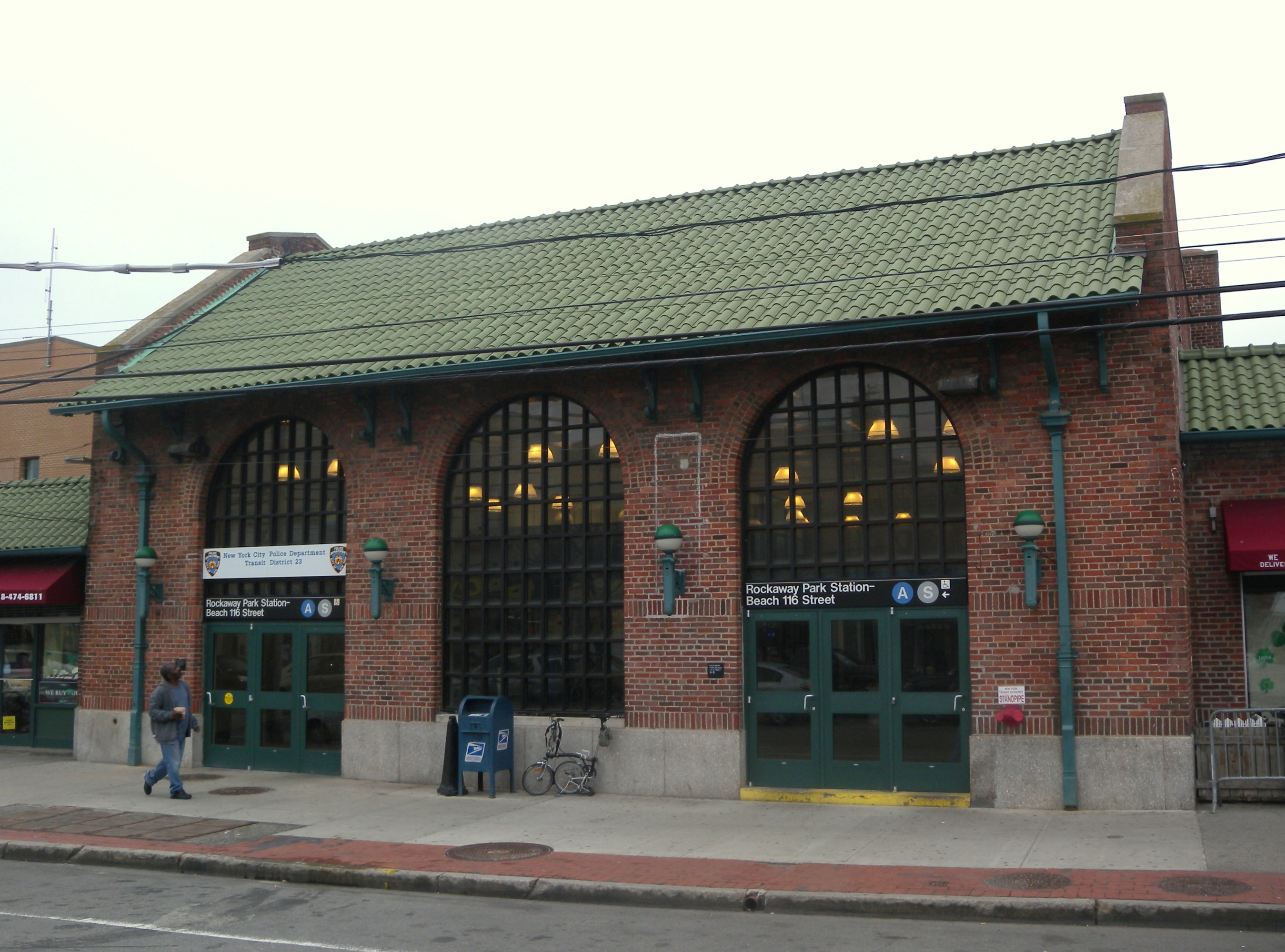
Station house

The station was originally built in 1882 as a Long Island Rail Road station on the Rockaway Beach Branch, was called Rockaway Beach, and contained a trolley stop for the Ocean Electric Railway, which eventually expanded their line further west to Belle Harbor and Neponsit. In 1899, the station was enlarged in order to accommodate the Brooklyn Rapid Transit Company cars, and the name was changed to Rockaway Park.

In spring 1917, a second station was built as a replacement for the former station, which was razed. After a 1950 fire at The Raunt destroyed the trestle across Jamaica Bay, the LIRR rerouted Rockaway Beach service along the Far Rockaway Branch, then abandoned the Rockaway Beach Branch. The New York City Board of Transportation purchased all stations on the branch in June 1952, and the New York City Transit Authority (successor to the Board of Transportation) closed them to LIRR service on October 3, 1955 in order to convert many of them into subway stations. The current station, Rockaway Park–Beach 116th Street, opened on June 28, 1956, with all other stations on the Rockaway Line except Far Rockaway. Far Rockaway reopened in 1958 after being rebuilt for Subway use, and the LIRR opened a new Far Rockaway station on Nameoke Street. Plans to add a subway line to the Rockaway Peninsula actually date back to the 1920s and originally involved extending the western terminus along Newport Avenue to Beach 149th Street, rather than its current terminus at Rockaway Park.

In 2002, it was announced that Rockaway Park would be one of ten subway stations citywide to receive renovations, which were budgeted at a collective $146 million. A new facility for NYPD Transit District 23 was also planned within the station. Some stores in the station were closed in March 2007 in advance of the project, which included station building, platform and yard renovations. The renovation was completed by early 2008, and the new police precinct opened in September 2009.

The segment of the line between Howard Beach and the Rockaway Peninsula suffered serious damage during Hurricane Sandy in October 2012 and was out of service for several months; service to the Rockaway Park station was not restored until May 30, 2013. In 2018, a two-phase program of flood mitigation work at the Hammels Wye junction required further service disruptions; the first phase from April to May suspended rush-hour A trips to Rockaway Park, while the second phase from July to September diverted all Far Rockaway A trips to Rockaway Park. A service to Rockaway Park was suspended again between January and May 2025 during reconstruction of the Hammels Wye. By 2026, the platform was so badly deteriorated that the rear or eastern end of the platform was blocked off. When full-length ten-car trains operated on the Rockaway Park Branch, passengers in the rear five cars had to be guided to the front of the train before passengers could alight. Although the MTA said that only five percent of trains used the platform's full length, two local City Council members requested that the MTA repair the platform.

== Station layout ==
The station is at ground level. There are two tracks and an island platform. The tracks end at bumper blocks at the west (railroad south) end of the platform. The station is served by the Rockaway Park Shuttle at all times and limited A trains during rush hours in the peak direction (toward Manhattan in the morning and toward the Rockaways in the afternoon). It is the southern terminus of all service; the next stop to the east (railroad north) is Beach 105th Street.

On either side of the station are tracks leading to the Rockaway Park Yard. Originally, terminal tracks with low-level platforms occupied the yard area during the LIRR years. The area of the current high-level platform was part of the LIRR depot yard.

=== Exit ===
As the entrance is at street level, the station is ADA accessible without the use of an elevator or ramps. The station house, located on the east side of Beach 116th Street between Rockaway Beach Boulevard and Beach Channel Drive, is made of concrete with windows and plywood walls and a brick exterior. It also has an entrance leading to an adjacent restaurant. An examination of the station house shows the former ticket windows, which were used when the line was part of the LIRR. The station houses Transit Police District 23, which was moved to the station in June 1977. A new police facility was opened on September 18, 2009. A NYCDOT municipal parking lot lies just north of the station.

== Gallery ==
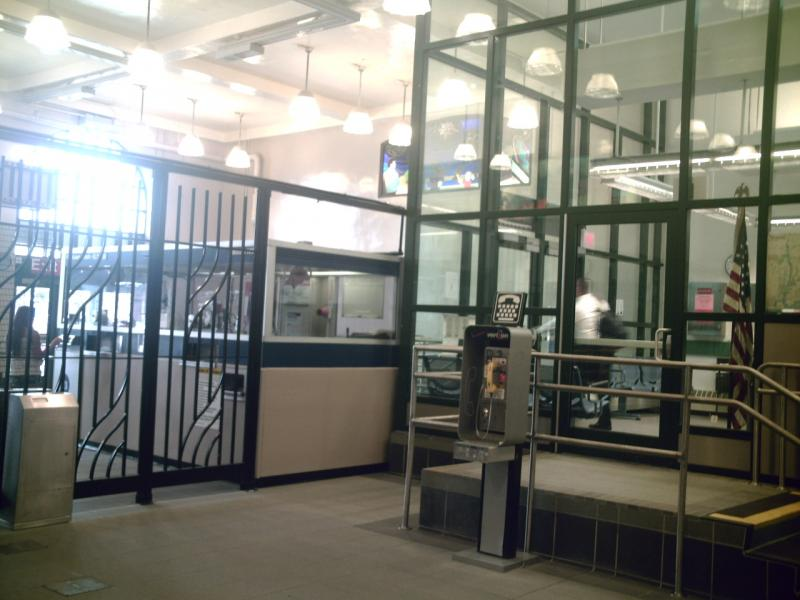
Mezzanine and police precinct

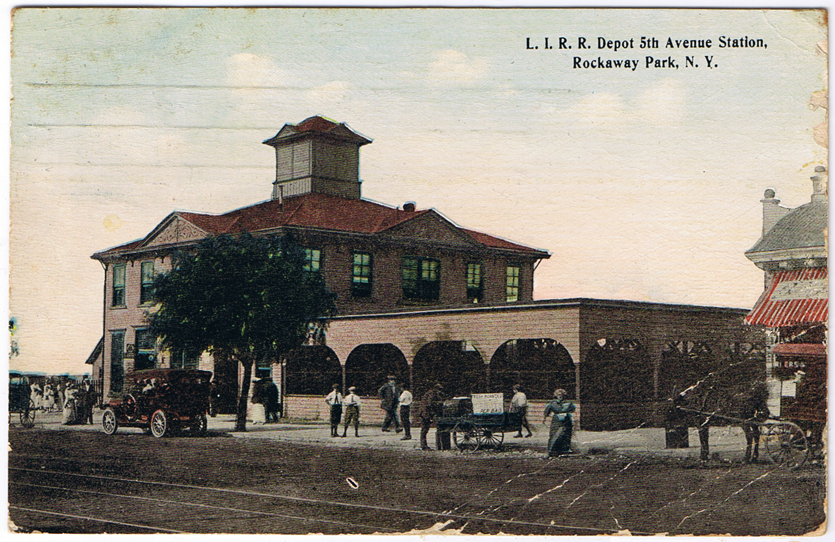
Postcard, ca. 1917

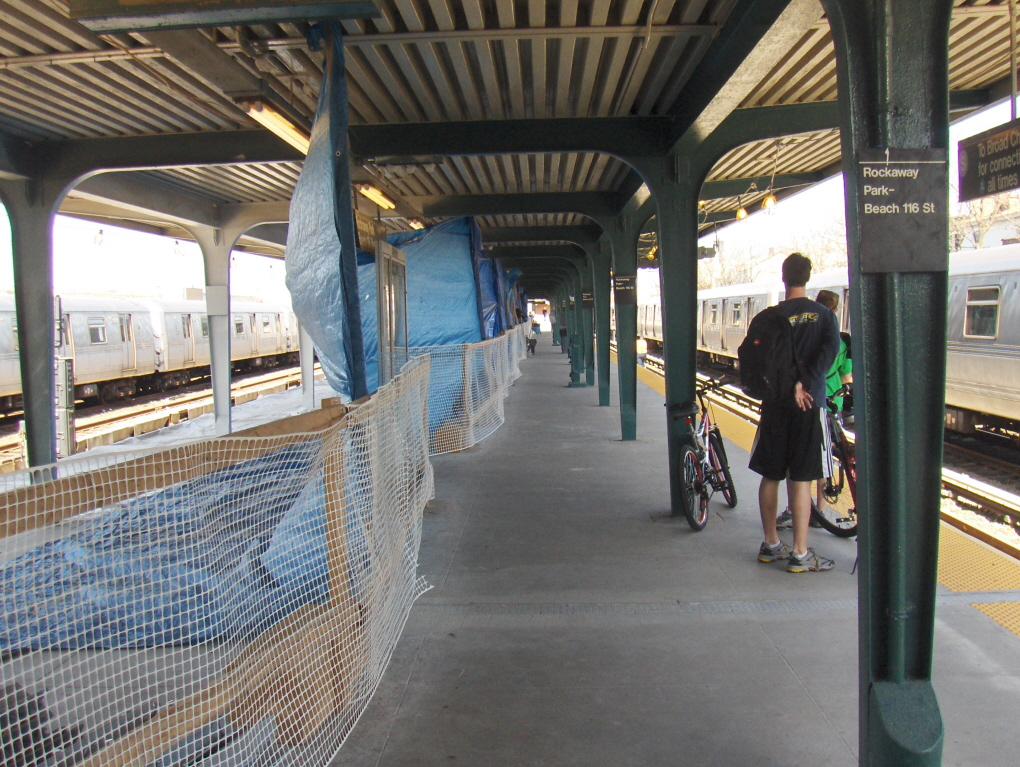
Platform reconstruction in 2007

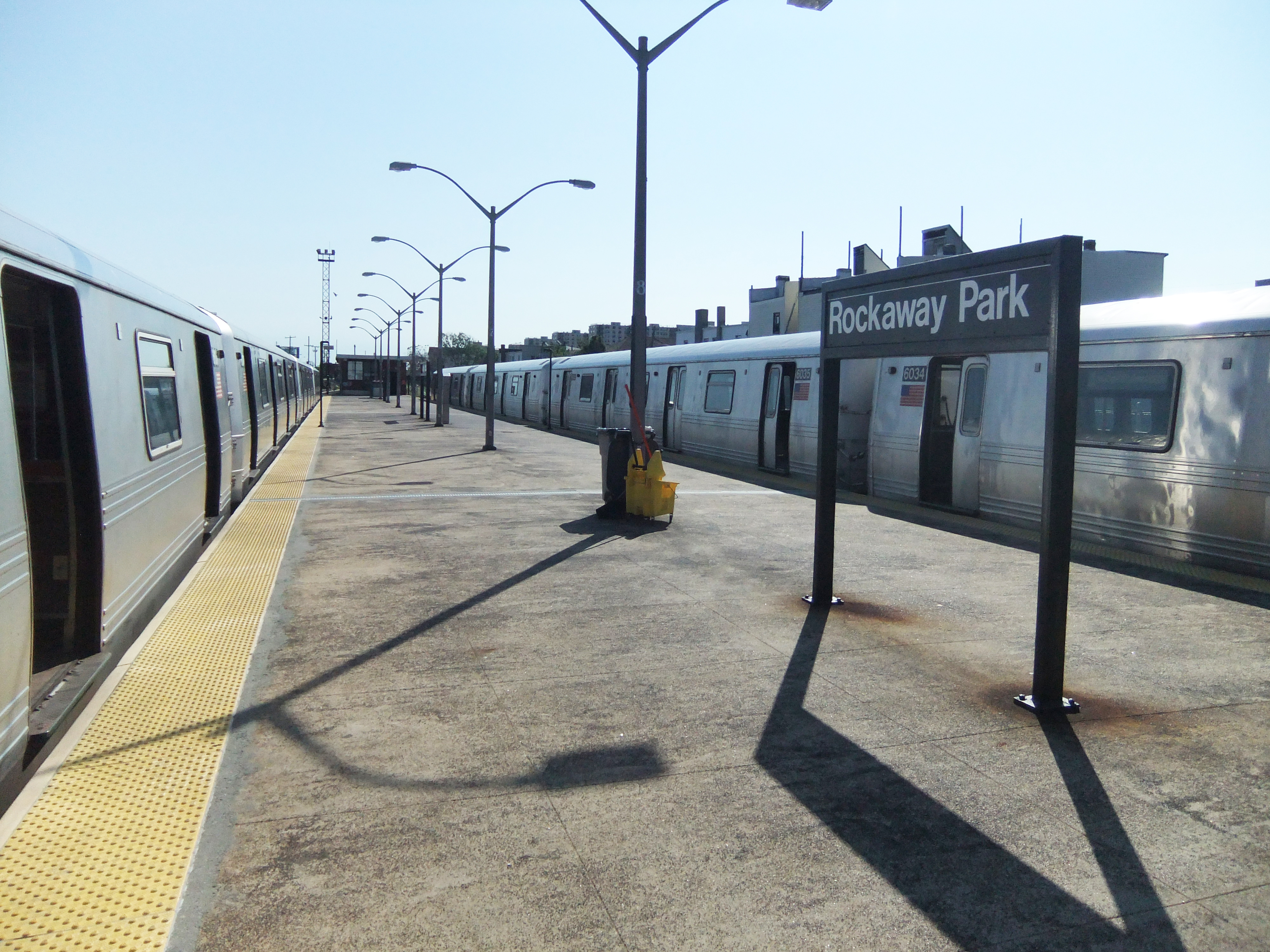
Northern half of the platform
