= Hammels, Queens =

Neighborhood in New York City

Coordinates: 40°35′16″N 73°48′29″W

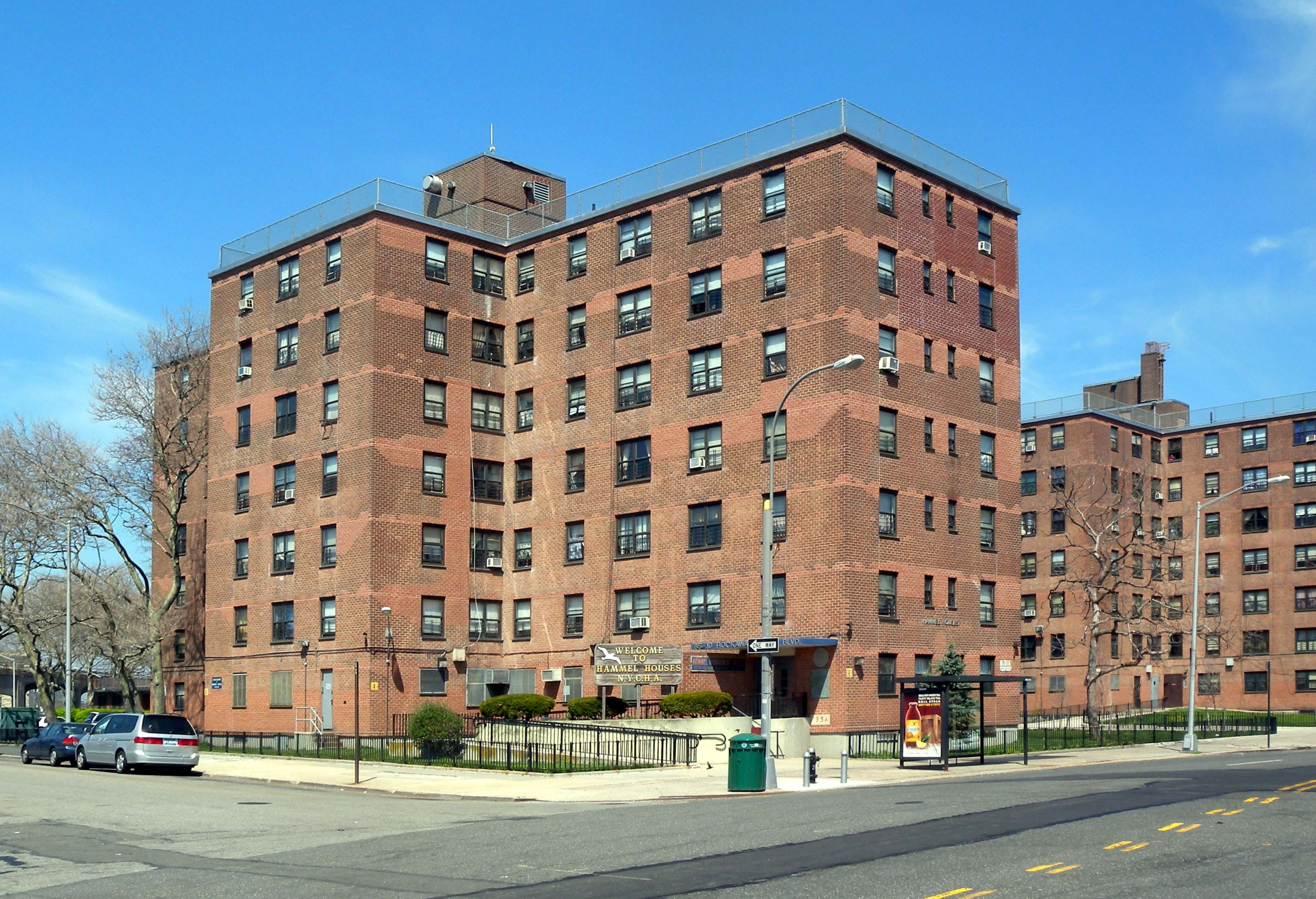
Hammel Houses NYCHA

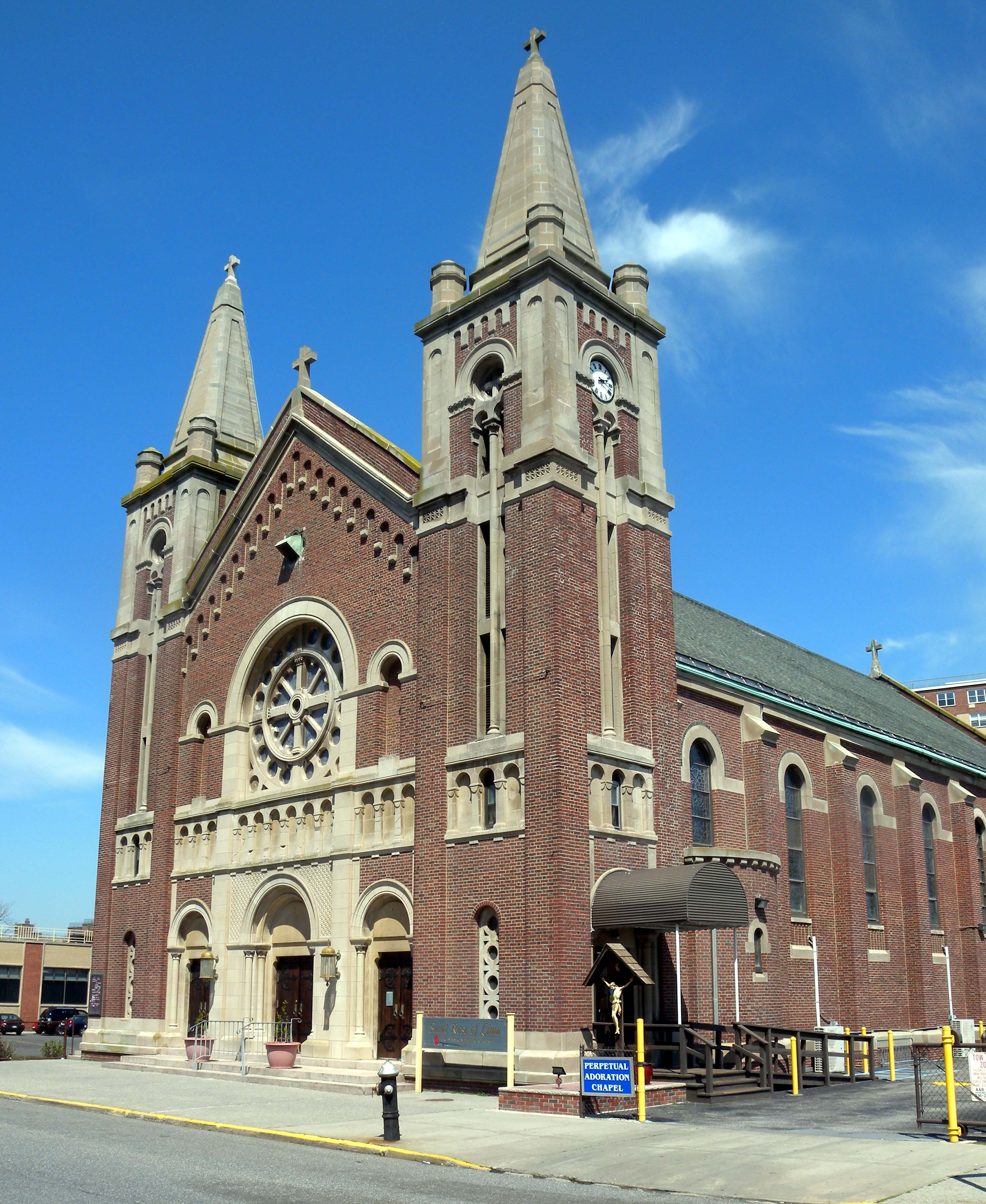
St. Rose of Lima Roman Catholic Church

Hammels is an area within Rockaway Beach on the Rockaway Peninsula in the New York City borough of Queens. It is located west of Arverne and east of Seaside, and is centered on Beach 84th Street. Its main thoroughfare is Beach Channel Drive. The New York City Subway's A train travels through the neighborhood on the IND Rockaway Line. The Hammel Houses, a public housing project built in 1955, is located in the neighborhood.

== History ==
Hammels was named for a local landowner, Louis Hammel (1836-1904). It originated as a summer community based on a series of boardwalks that ran between the Bay and Ocean shores. This was followed by a hotel, the Eldert House, that was kept by Garret Eldert and faced the bay on the east side of what today is Beach 85th Street. In August 1869, Louis Hammel leased the hotel. The New York, Woodhaven & Rockaway Railroad ran within a few feet of the hotel as a trestle was erected across the bay in 1880. The hotel gave an easement for the construction of the Hammels station, which was used as the name for the entire community.

A dock in front of the hotel on the Bay side, known as Fifth Landing, was a regular stop for boats of the Iron Steamboat Company. As the Rockaway resorts declined, residency changed to permanent residents. In 1897, Hammels merged with Hollands and was incorporated as the Village of Rockaway Beach. The following year, Rockaway Beach became part of the City of Greater New York when the five boroughs consolidated into a single city and New York City was created.

The New York City Housing Authority (NYCHA) operates the Hammel Houses, which were completed in April 1955 and has 700 apartments spread across 14 buildings on a site covering 14 acres (5.7 ha) between Beach 81st and 86th streets along Rockaway Beach Boulevard and Beach Channel Drive.

== Transportation ==
Hammels is served by the Q22 and Q52 SBS local buses and the QM15 and QM17 express buses. There is no subway station in the area, but the A and Rockaway Park Shuttle trains head north to Broad Channel via Hammels Wye.
