= Rockaway Beach, Queens =

Rockaway Beach
- Neighborhood of Queens
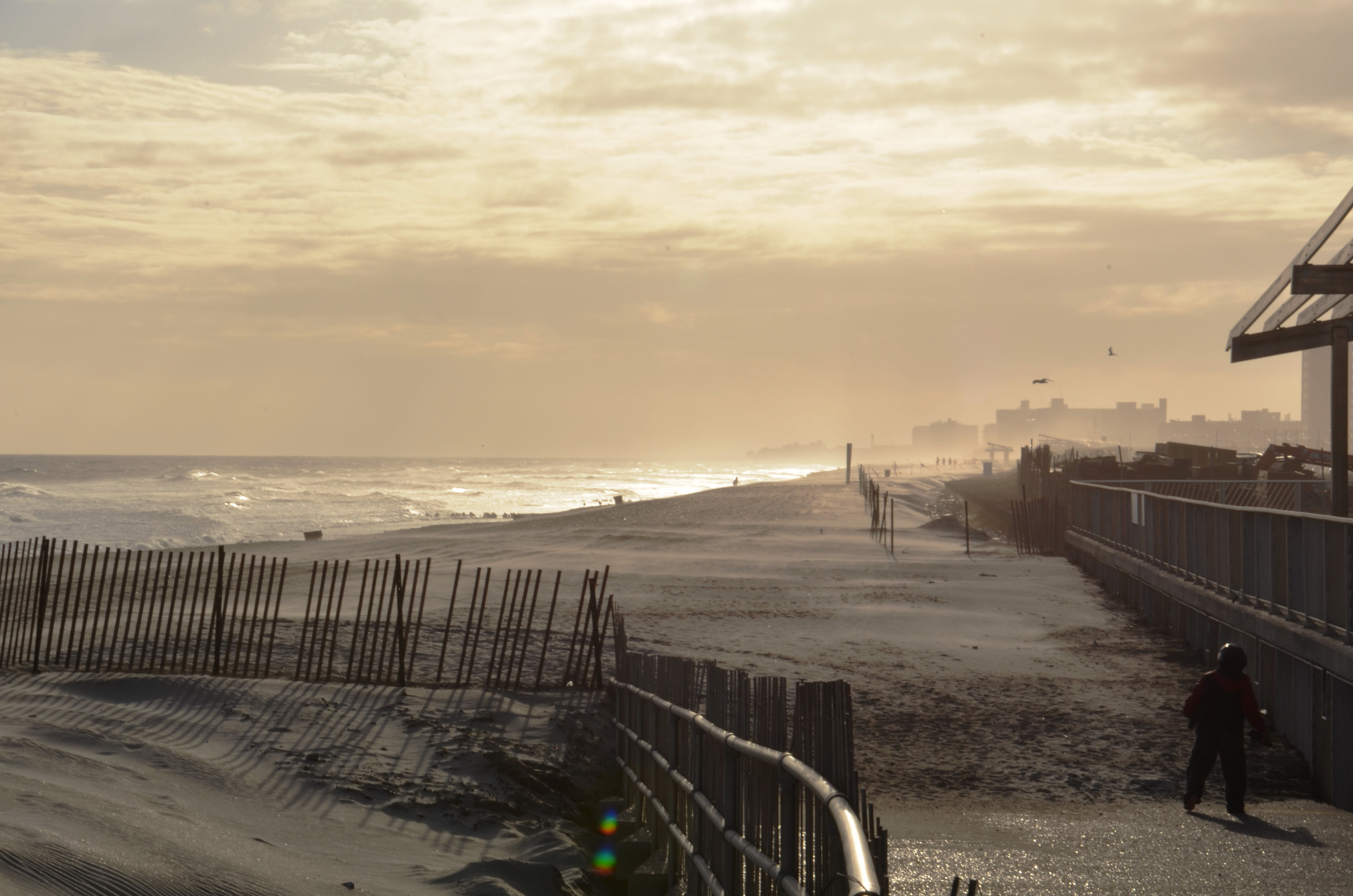
- Rockaway Beach in 2013
- Coordinates: 40.586°N 73.812°W
- Country: United States
- State: New York
- City: New York City
- County/Borough: Queens
- Community District: Queens 14

Population (2010)
  - Total: 13,449

Ethnicity
  - White: 59.2%
  - Black: 29.3%
  - Hispanic: 14.5%
  - Asian: 2.0%
  - Other: 5.9%

Economics
  - Median income: $37,248
- Time zone: UTC−5 (EST)
  - Summer (DST): UTC−4 (EDT)
- ZIP Code: 11693
- Area codes: 718, 347, 929, and 917

Rockaway Beach is a neighborhood on the Rockaway Peninsula in the New York City borough of Queens. The neighborhood is bounded by Arverne to the east and Rockaway Park to the west. It is named for the Rockaway Beach and Boardwalk, which is the largest urban beach in the United States, stretching from Beach 3rd to Beach 153rd Streets on the Atlantic Ocean. The neighborhood, with 13,000 residents as of 2010, is also known as the "Irish Riviera" because of its large Irish American population.

Rockaway Beach saw major development after WWII as part of a city-wide project to alleviate a housing shortage. However, building cheap dense buildings close to the salty ocean resulted in Rockaway turning into an outpost for the city's neediest populations.

== History ==
=== Early development ===
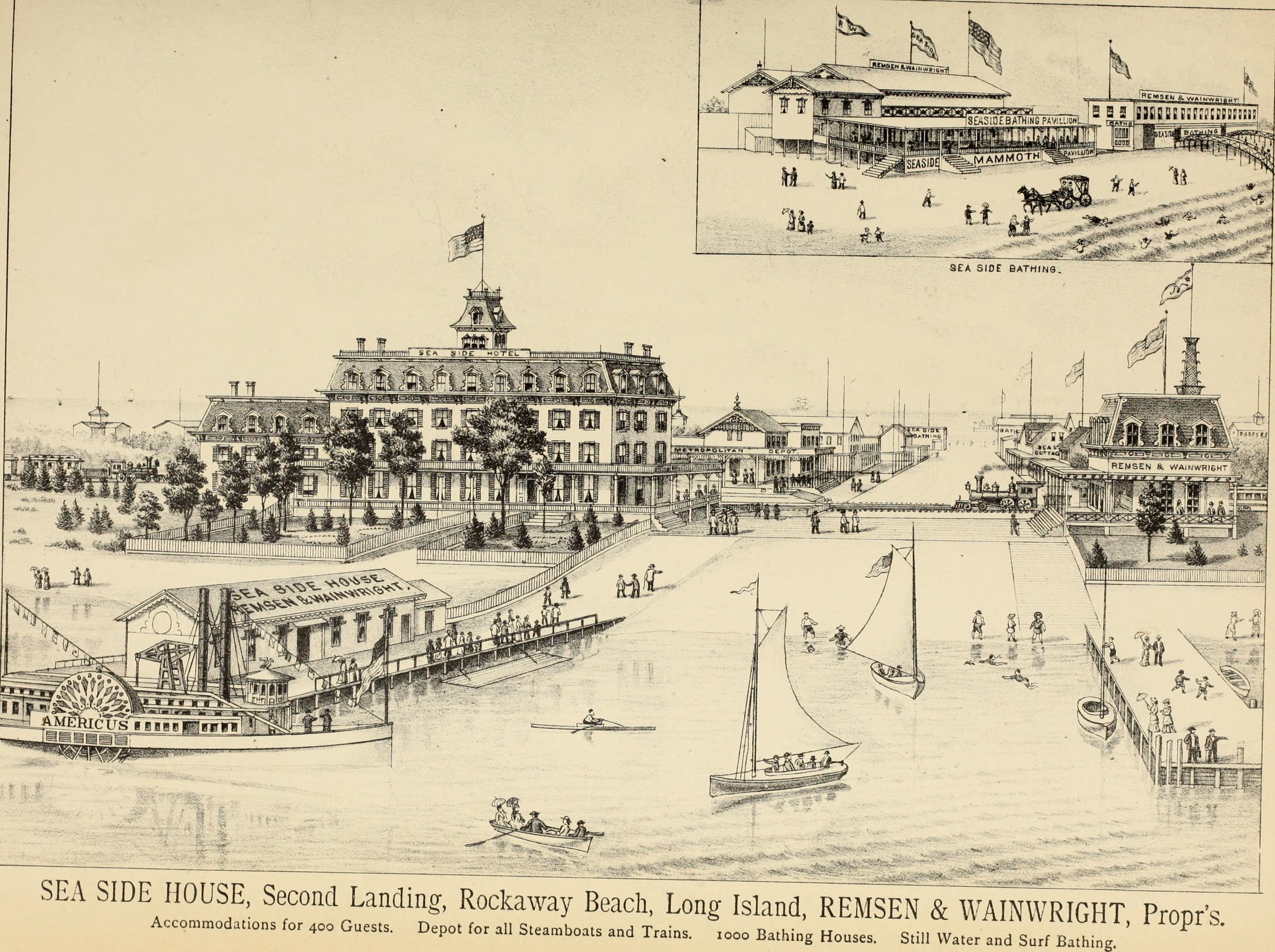
Rockaway Beach in the 1880s, with new railroad and resort hotel

What is now Rockaway Beach was formerly two different hamlets, Holland and Hammels. In 1857, Michael P. Holland had purchased land and named the area after himself. Soon afterward, Louis Hammel, an immigrant from Germany, bought a tract of land just east of Holland. In 1878, he decided to give portions of his land to the New York, Woodhaven and Rockaway Railroad in order to build a railroad station for the peninsula. The area around it became collectively known as "Hammels". On June 11, 1897, Hammels merged with Holland and they incorporated as the Village of Rockaway Beach. One year later, it was incorporated into the City of Greater New York and became part of the newly formed borough of Queens. However, the neighborhood, along with the eastern communities of Arverne and Far Rockaway, tried to secede from the city several times. In 1915 and 1917, a bill approving the secession passed in the legislature but was vetoed by the mayor at the time, John Purroy Mitchel.

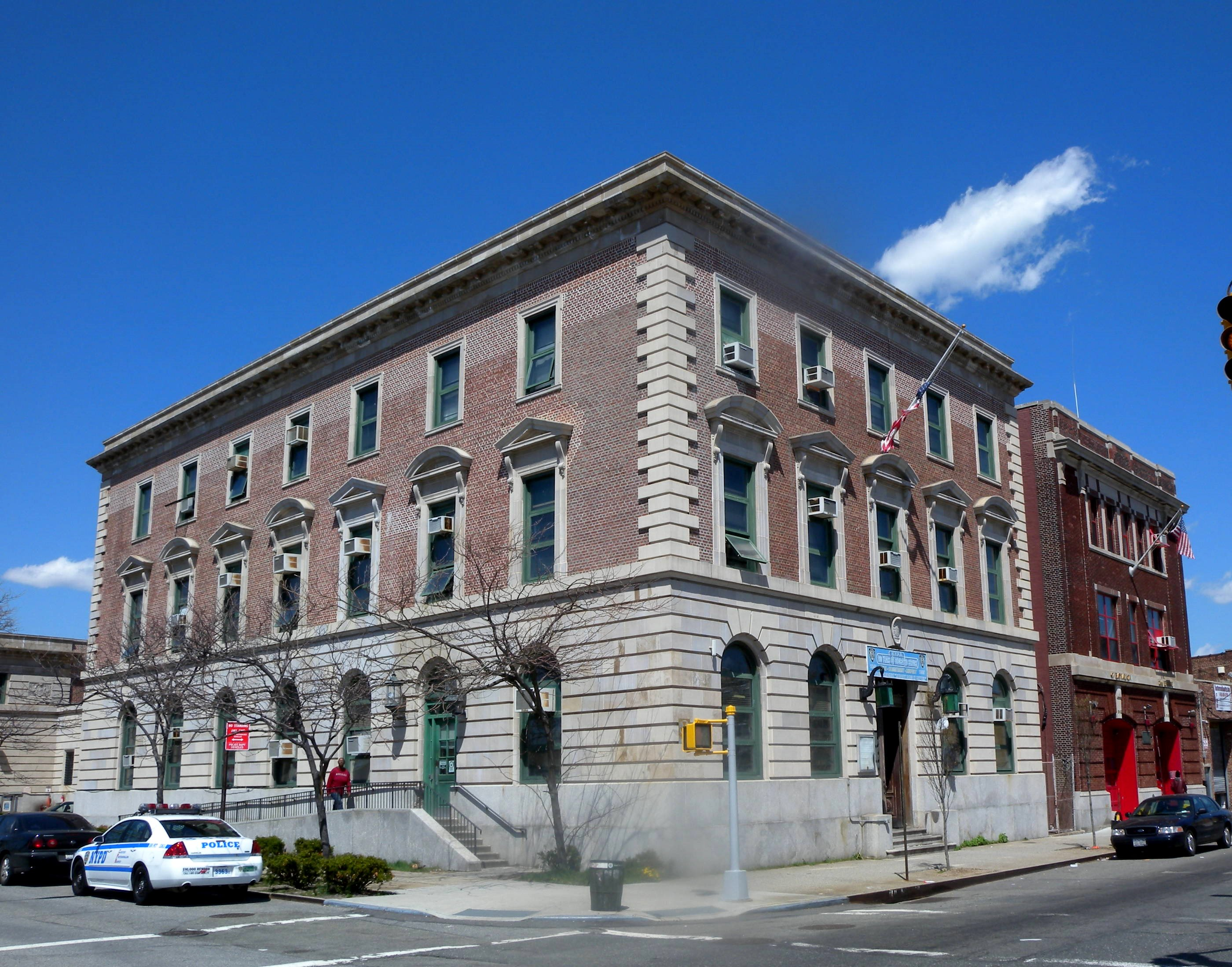
Police station

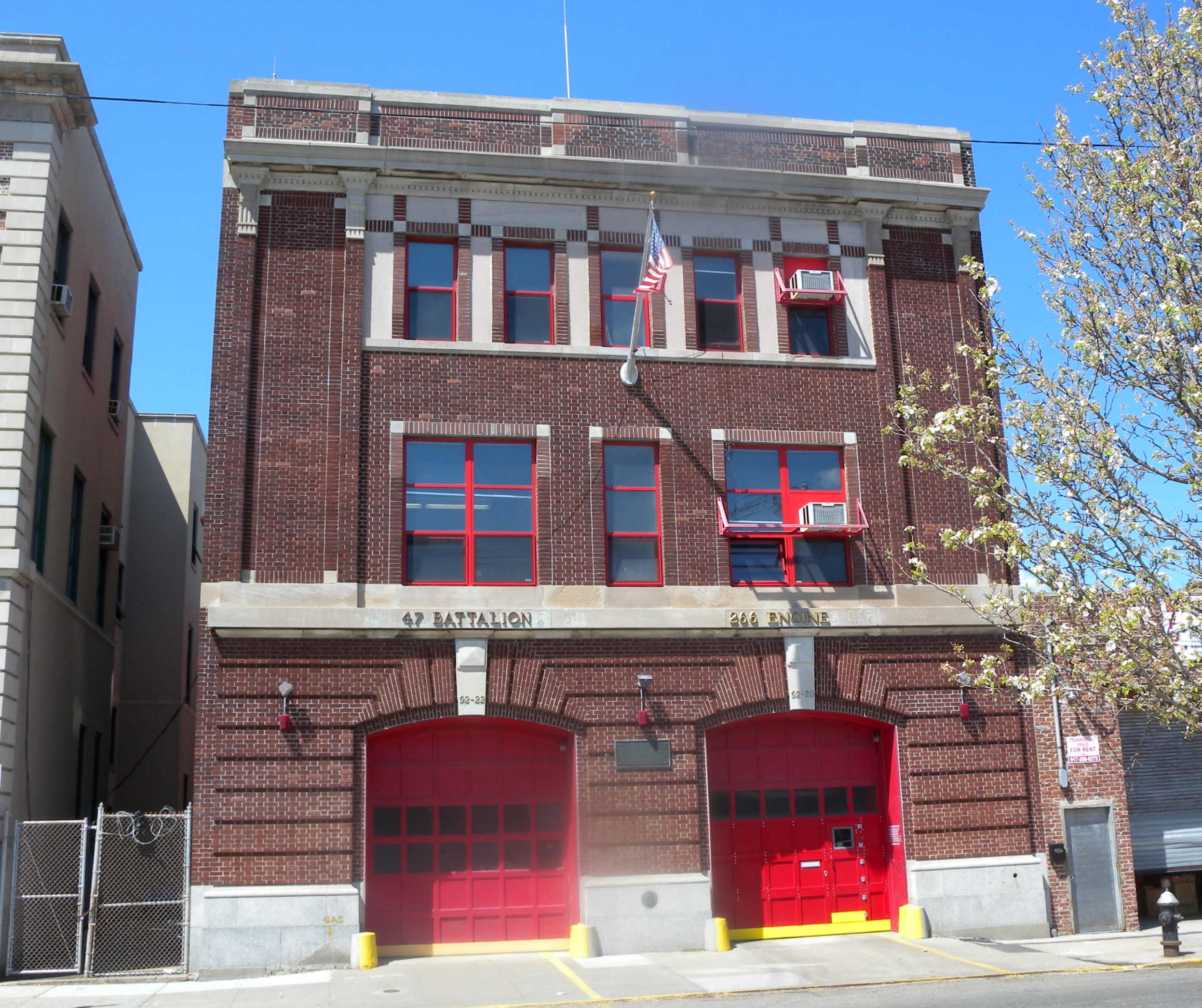
Firehouse

In the early 1900s, the newly built railroad station opened up the community and the rest of the peninsula to a broad range of the population. The wealthy no longer had a monopoly on the peninsula, as various amusement parks, stores, and resort hotels attracted people from all over the city to spend a day or a whole summer there. Much of the area was developed by James S. Remsen and William Wainwright. In this era, it became known as "New York's Playground".

Rockaway's famous amusement park, Rockaways' Playland, was built in 1901 and quickly became a major attraction for people around the region. With its growing popularity, concern over swimming etiquette became a problem and early in 1904, the Captain of the NYPD, Louis Kreuscher, issued rules for those using the beach, censoring the bathing suits to be worn, where photographs could be taken, and specifying that women in bathing suits were not allowed to leave the beachfront.

The park was grand for its time. One of its most popular attractions, the Atom Smasher roller coaster, would be featured in the beginning of This is Cinerama, a pre-IMAX type movie, in 1952. An Olympic-size swimming pool and a million-dollar midway also were built within the amusement park; they would serve the community for over eighty years.

The Temple of Israel Synagogue was built in 1921, and listed on the National Register of Historic Places in 2014.

=== 1930s–1960s ===
In the 1930s, Robert Moses came to power as New York City's Parks Commissioner and his extensive road and transportation projects were both a benefit and disaster for the neighborhood. As commissioner, Moses ordered the construction of the Marine Parkway Bridge and the Cross Bay Veterans Memorial Bridge. The bridges were completed in 1937 and 1939 respectively. The Marine Parkway Bridge was built further west on the peninsula between Jacob Riis Park and Breezy Point linking the isolated communities to Brooklyn. The Cross Bay Bridge landed in the middle of the neighborhood of Rockaway Beach.

The new bridge made the community the peninsula's gateway to Queens as it provided the only direct car access to the borough. The construction of the two bridges started to transform the neighborhood and the rest of the peninsula into a more year-round residential area or commuter town, as people had a more convenient way to travel to and from work. The conversion of the Rockaway Beach LIRR branch to the Rockaway subway line also brought an increase to Rockaway's permanent residents.

Although the bridges were intended to improve the Rockaways, Moses' other projects both directly and indirectly hurt the community. One such failed project was the planned construction of the Shore Front Parkway in the 1950s and 1960s. Wanting to connect Staten Island to the Hamptons, Moses focused on making a highway through the Rockaway Peninsula. His idea was to connect the Marine Parkway Bridge with the Atlantic Beach Bridge, which connected the Rockaway Peninsula to Nassau County. The plan would also provide an extension midway through to include the Cross Bay Bridge. Many feared that such an extensive project would do more harm to the peninsula than good and pointed to the community displacement that had happened in the South Bronx because of Moses' roadway construction

Although Moses never got to make his highway, he did leave his mark. A piece of the planned parkway that ran west to east in the Rockaway Park and Rockaway Beach neighborhoods was constructed and opened in 1939. Houses were literally cut in half in order to build the four-lane street. Some of these houses are still standing today. The existing, still unfinished street is locally known as the "road from nowhere to nowhere" because it does not have any relevant connections to any other area or highway.

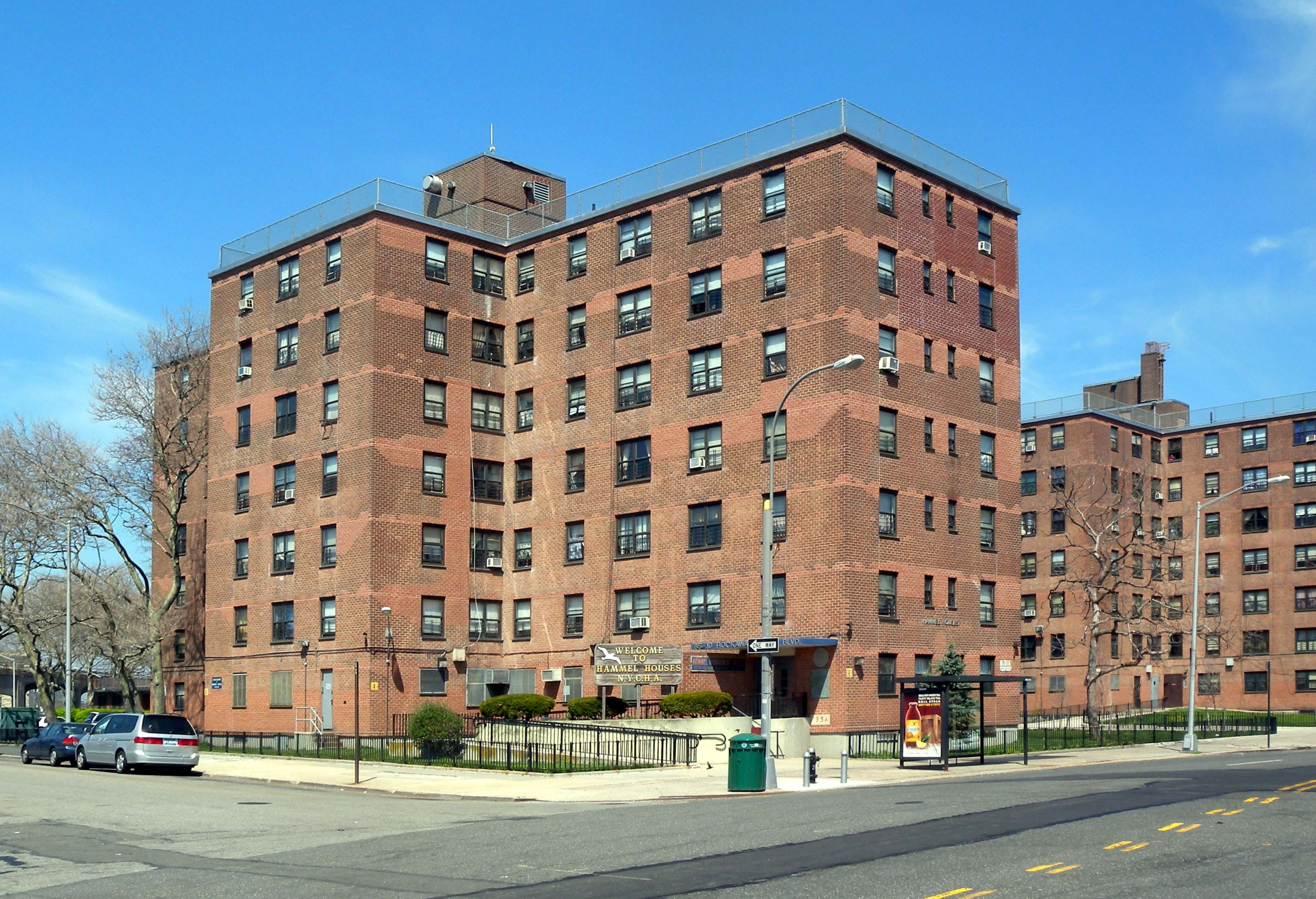
Hammel Houses

Robert Moses' construction of other recreational areas and facilities, such as the New York Aquarium and Jones Beach State Park, indirectly impacted the neighborhood as well. These more modern recreational facilities lured tourists and beachgoers away from the peninsula. With fewer customers, businesses and hotels closed, and by the 1950s, the area had fallen into economic decline. The transition from a summer vacationing area to a full-time residential neighborhood had taken its toll.

In an effort to revitalize the neighborhood, the city constructed the Hammel Houses. This social housing project would be one of the many so-called urban renewal efforts that dominated the community and much of its eastern neighbors in the last half of the 20th century. The New York City Housing Authority purchased the land in 1952 on the north side of the elevated track. In 1964, the Authority decided to demolish and rebuild the entire area to what it is today.

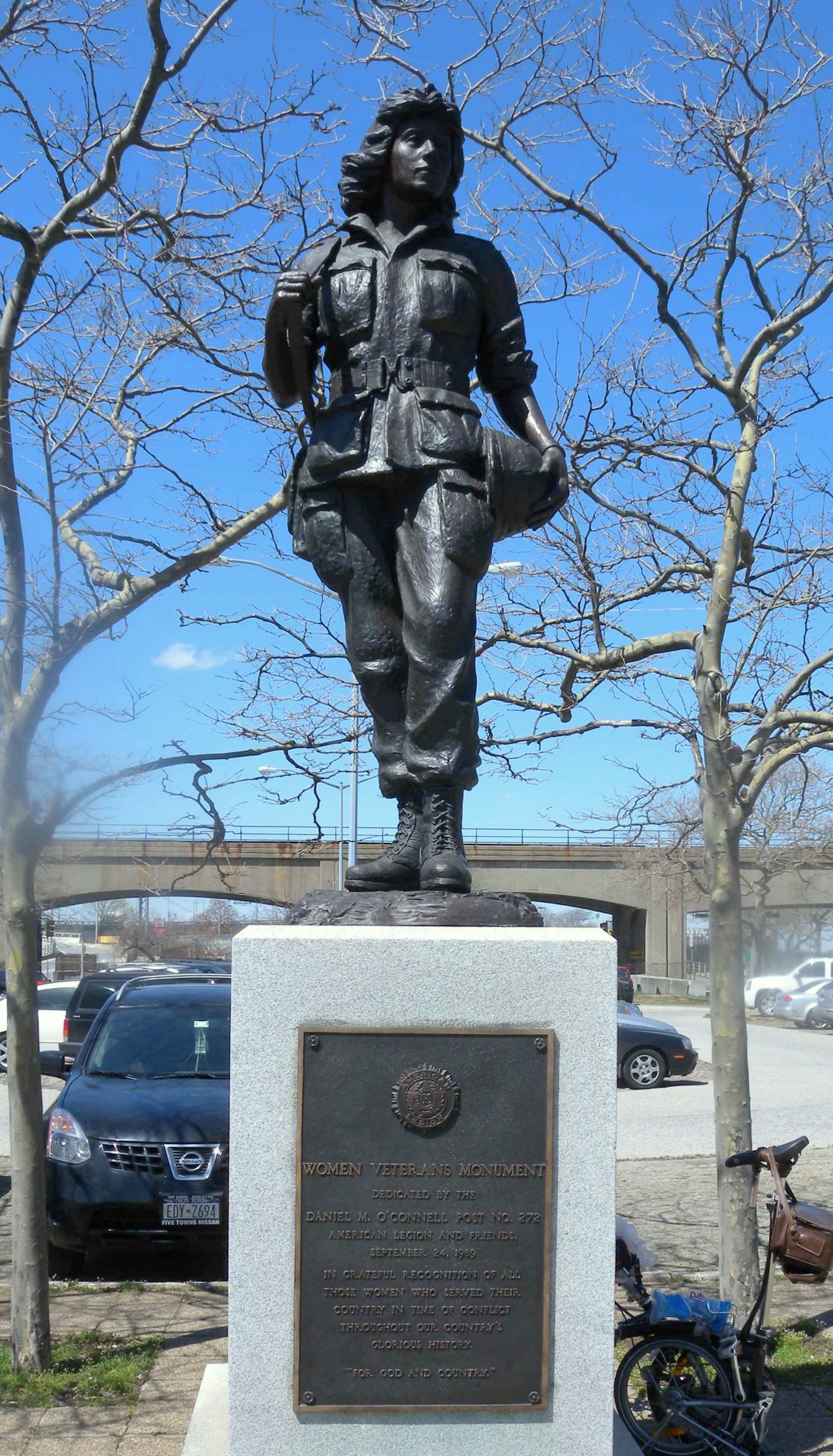
Women veterans memorial

In addition to the Hammel Houses, the Dayton Beach Park Cooperative, which, unlike the Hammel Houses, are not projects, was constructed on the south side of the community. The rectangular buildings, all of them thirteen stories high, were placed in close proximity to the shoreline. The building was completed by the end of the 1960s along with the similar looking Surfside Park Apartments and Dayton Towers West in nearby Rockaway Park. The buildings still dominate Rockaway Beach's skyline today, nestled between Rockaway Beach Boulevard to the north and Shore Front Parkway to the south.

The Rockaway Courthouse was built in 1931; it served as a local Municipal and Magistrate's Court and was last used as a civic building in 1962. It was listed on the National Register of Historic Places in 2014.

=== Early 21st century ===
With more and more people moving to the city, the Rockaways became a destination for day trippers. The area appears in New York magazine's 2007 spring travel issue as a place for "Surfing" and to "scuba dive for sunken ships".

Out-of-towners start to call the beach "Williamsburg on the Rockaways" because some surfers from the Brooklyn neighborhood spend whole summers out in the Rockaways.

The community was devastated by Hurricane Sandy in late 2012. Rockaway Beach reconstruction began with Phase One, a $10 million contract provided by the Army Corps of Engineers to restore 600,000 cubic yards (460,000 m^{3}) of sand along Rockaway Beach in August 2013. The second phase put nearly 3.5 million cubic yards (2,700,000 m^{3}) of sand in 2014 at a cost of about $37 million. Phase Two was paid by the federal government through the Hurricane Sandy relief bill.

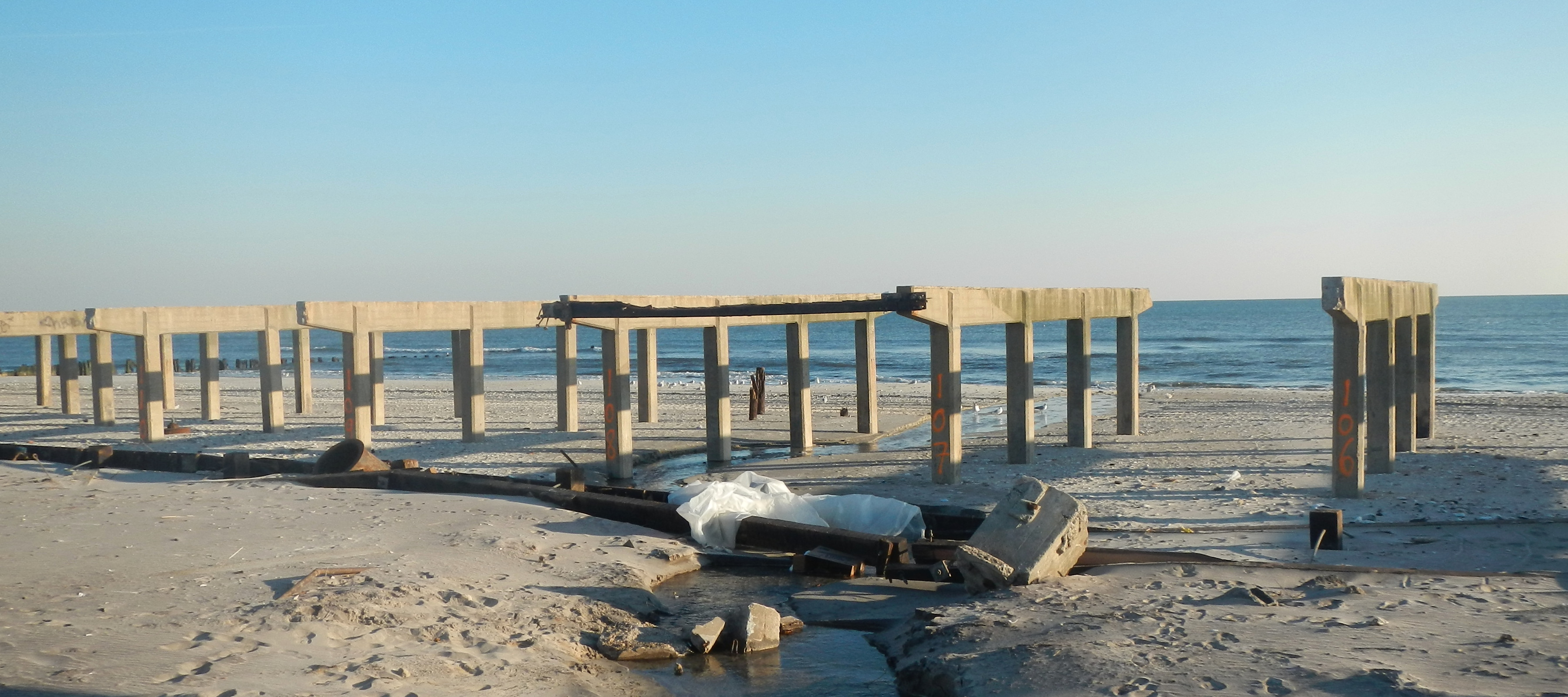
Boardwalk stripped by Hurricane Sandy

== Demographics ==
Based on data from the 2010 United States census, the population of the combined area of Breezy Point/Belle Harbor/Rockaway Park/Broad Channel was 28,018, an increase of 1,307 (4.9%) from the 26,711 counted in 2000. Covering an area of 2,033.88 acres (823.08 ha), the four neighborhoods had a population density of 13.8 inhabitants per acre (8,800/sq mi).

The racial makeup of the neighborhoods was 78.3% (21,946) White, 7.5% (2,095) African American, 0.1% (29) Native American, 2.1% (595) Asian, 0.0% (8) Pacific Islander, 0.2% (66) from other races, and 0.9% (259) from two or more races. Hispanic or Latino of any race were 10.8% (3,020) of the population.

Rockaway Beach is known as the "Irish Riviera" because of the large Irish American population in the area. The community itself has a total population of more than 13,000 people, making it the third most populated neighborhood on the peninsula. As of the 2000 United States census, 25.4% of residents in ZIP code 11693 identified themselves as having Irish ancestry, making the Rockaway Beach area the 2nd most Irish region in the whole country—right after Boston, Massachusetts's South Shore, which has roughly 38–40% of its citizens claiming Irish, or mostly Irish, ancestry.

== Education ==
The neighborhood, like all of New York City, is served by the New York City Department of Education. Rockaway Beach residents are zoned to either P.S. 183, an elementary school, or P.S. 225, a middle school. Additionally, the community contains two private Catholic elementary schools: St. Camillus and St. Rose of Lima.

All New York City residents who wish to attend a public high school must apply, as there is no zoning. Although there is no high school within the community's boundaries, there are four nearby in the same building, all part of the Beach Channel Educational Campus.

== Transportation ==
The Q22 and Q35 local buses, and the Q52/Q53 SBS serve the Rockaway Beach area. The QM15, QM16 and QM17 provide express service from the area to Manhattan.

The neighborhood's stations are Beach 90th Street and Beach 98th Street, served by the A and S trains. The Q35 goes to the Flatbush Avenue – Brooklyn College subway station (2 and 5 trains) in Midwood, Brooklyn, and the Q53 SBS connects with the 61st Street – Woodside subway station (7 and <7> trains) and the Woodside LIRR station in Woodside. In May 2017, the NYC Ferry initiated service to Rockaway, docking at 108th Street and Beach Channel Drive. This has made the commute into Rockaway more accessible for those who work in Manhattan or want to visit the area from Brooklyn or Manhattan.

== Notable people ==
- Skip Campbell (1948–2018), Florida legislator and mayor of Coral Springs, Florida born in Rockaway Beach.
- Vito J. Castellano, Adjutant General of New York
- David Lifton, author.
- Michael "Iz the Wiz" Martin (1958–2009), one of the most prominent graffiti writers of the early New York graffiti movement.
- Al McGuire (1928–2001), college basketball coach and broadcaster, raised in Rockaway Beach
- Jonathan Monaghan (born 1986), visual artist, born and raised in Rockaway Beach
- Patti Smith (born 1946), punk rocker-poet, wrote about living in Rockaway Beach in her 2015 memoir, M Train.
- Andrew VanWyngarden (born 1983), co-founder of psychedelic rock band MGMT, bought a house in Rockaway Beach in 2012.
- Kenny Vance (born 1943), singer-songwriter and producer.

== In popular culture ==
- Woody Allen's Radio Days, a 1987 movie highlighting the on goings of a working-class family during the 1930s and '40s, was filmed on location in Rockaway Beach.
- The 2010 documentary film Our Hawaii, by Kryssa Schemmerling, explores the surf culture that sprung up at Rockaway Beach starting in the late 1960s.
- Jill Eisenstadt's novels From Rockaway and Swell are set within the world of Rockaway Beach: From Rockaway (1987) within the lifeguard culture during the 1980s and Swell (2017) against the backdrops of the Golden Venture tragedy and the aftermath of 9/11.
- Rockaway Beach is featured prominently in the song Sunscreen by New York artist Matt Booshell
- In a 1973 episode of the TV sitcom All In The Family, Edith Bunker tells daughter Gloria that as a teenager she had been the victim of an attempted date rape while visiting Rockaway Beach.
- In the first episode of the second season of The Marvelous Mrs. Maisel, it is revealed that Susie Meyerson (played by Alex Borstein) was born and raised in The Rockaways, a fact that saves her from being beaten up by a pair of thugs who happen to be from the area too. They say they never meet 'a Rockaway girl' in the city.
- In the Sons of Anarchy, the character Frankie Diamonds is said to have "worked as muscle for the Gambinos down in Rockaway"; according to Clay Morrow.
- In Ramona and Her Father, Ramona Quimby remarks in her thoughts that her older sister, Beezus Quimby, strongly dislikes certain types of clothing, among them her shirt with Rockaway Beach printed on the front.
- "Rockaway Beach" is a 1977 song by the Ramones, from the band's album Rocket to Russia. It was the Ramones' highest-charting single in their career, peaking at number 66 on the Billboard Hot 100.
