= Rockaway Courthouse =

United States historic place

- U.S. National Register of Historic Places
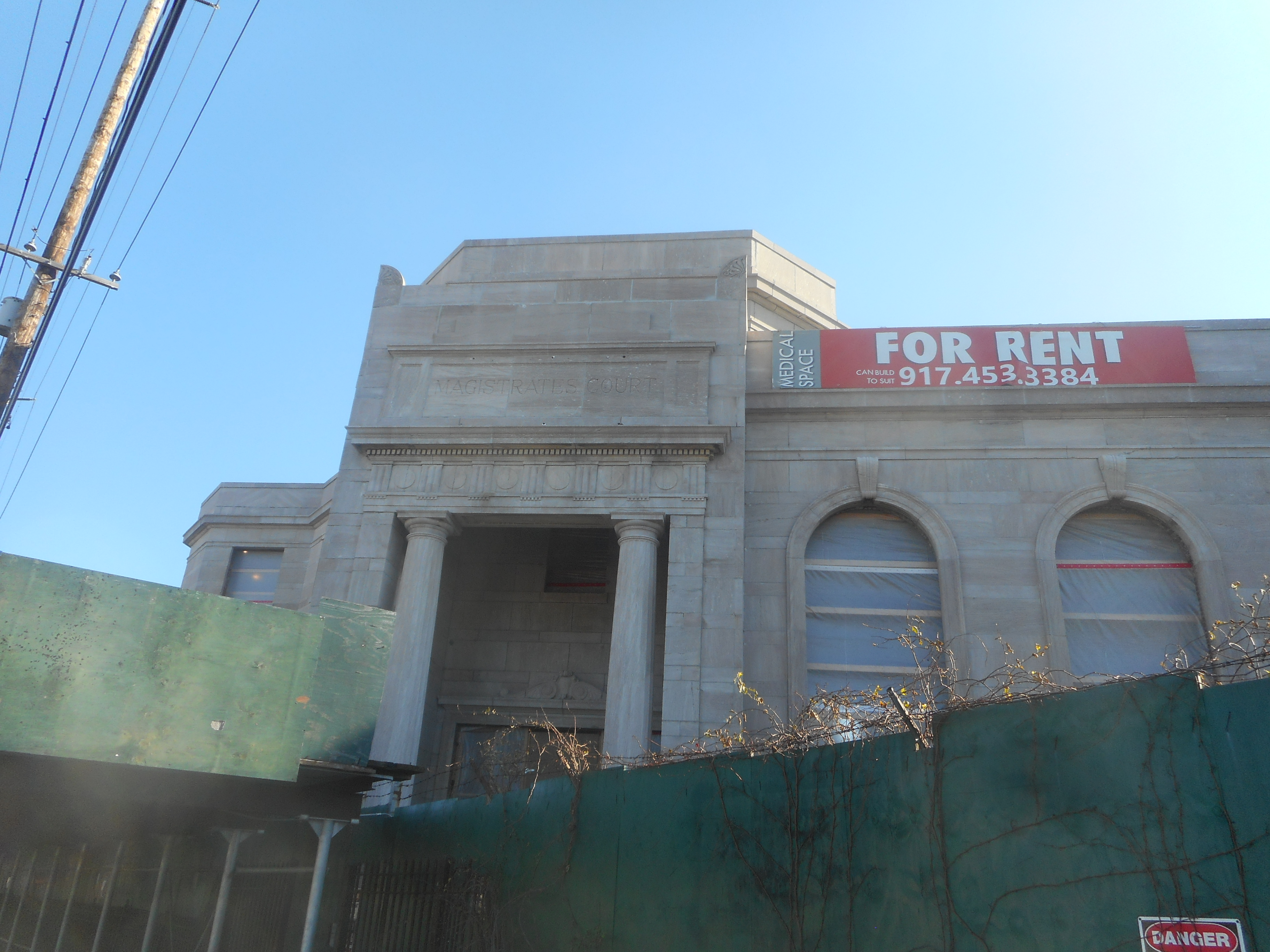
- The courthouse under reconstruction as medical offices in November 2019.

- Location within New York City Location within New York Location within the United States
- Location: 90-01 Beach Channel Dr. Rockaway Beach, New York
- Coordinates: 40°35′20″N 73°48′58″W
- Area: 0.48 acres (0.19 ha)
- Built: 1931
- Architect: Paul C. Hunter
- Architectural style: Classical Revival
- NRHP reference No.: 13001155
- Added to NRHP: February 5, 2014

Rockaway Courthouse is a historic courthouse located in the Rockaway Beach neighborhood of Queens County, New York. It was built in 1931, and is a three-story plus basement, steel frame and limestone, V-shaped building in the Classical Revival style. It consists of a tall central core with flanking courtroom wings. The front facade features an ornate Greek style entrance portico. It served as a local Municipal and Magistrate's Court and was last used as a civic building in 1962.

It was listed on the National Register of Historic Places in 2014. Today the building is being reconstructed as a medical center.
