= William Wainwright (land developer) =

American real estate developer (1836–1904)

- Born: 1836; Philadelphia, Pennsylvania, U.S.
- Died: August 14, 1904; Brooklyn, New York, U.S.

William Wainwright (1836, Philadelphia, Pennsylvania – August 14, 1904, Brooklyn, New York) was a real-estate developer who was largely responsible in the late 19th and early 20th centuries for the transformation of Rockaway Beach, New York City, into a major resort and amusement area.

== Biography ==
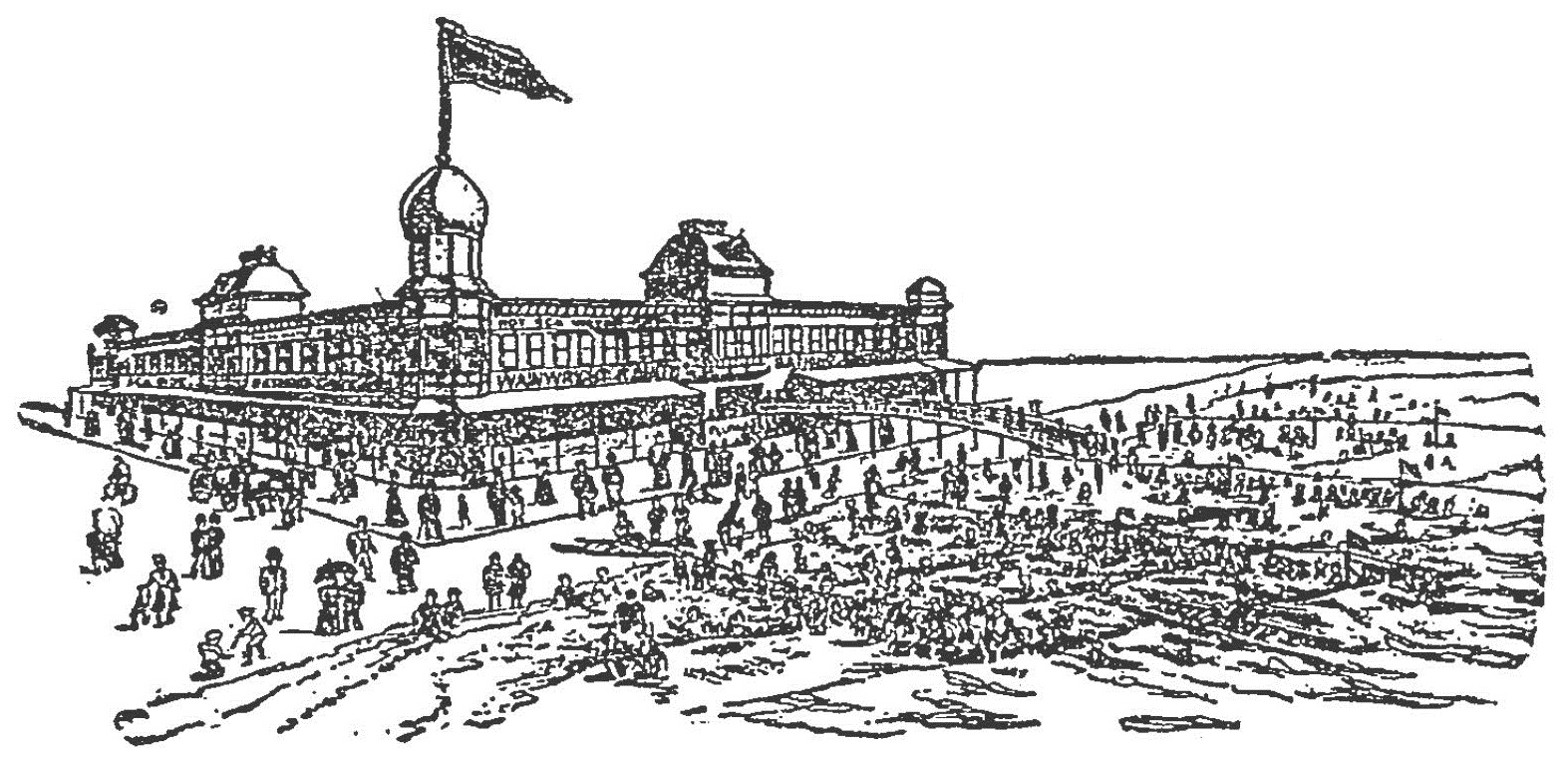
Wainwright & Smith resort in Rockaway Beach, 1904

Wainwright was born in Philadelphia in 1836. At the age of 15, he moved to New York in order to find work. He worked in the mailing room of The New York Times for a few years. Afterwards, Wainwright founded the Brooklyn News Agency. After building up the business, he sold the Brooklyn News Agency to the American News Agency and moved to the City of Williamsburg in Brooklyn. He opened a billiard hall on Grand Street. After adding a restaurant to the establishment, it became a well-known oyster house.

Wainwright was elected to the New York State Assembly in 1870. He declined to run for reelection, preferring to focus on his business interests.

Wainwright opened the Odeon Theatre in Williamsburg, which also had a billiard room and restaurant on site.

After selling the Odeon Theatre, Wainwright became the owner of the Lake House in Lake Hopatcong, New Jersey. He subsequently sold the Lake House and bought the Pavilion, which was at the time the largest hotel in Islip, Long Island.

In 1875, Wainwright sold all of his businesses in order to buy half the interest in 150 acres (61 ha) of land in Rockaway Beach for $15,000. With his partner James Remsen, the firm of Remsen & Wainwright began developing Rockaway Beach. The firm built the Seaside House, which was then the largest hotel on the coast. He continued to manage and expand the hotel after Remsen's death in 1887. After Wainwright took another partner, the name Wainwright & Smith became ubiquitous on different amusement pavilions in Rockaway Beach. A fire of unknown cause burned eight blocks of Rockaway Beach, including the Seaside House on September 21, 1892. Wainwright rebuilt the Seaside House even larger than before.

Wainwright retired from actively managing his business in 1901 due to his poor health. His son J. W. Wainwright took over the management for him.

On June 1, 1902, a fire started in the rear of Kasten's Hotel in Rockaway Beach. The fire spread and ended up killing four people, injuring four other people, and destroying many of the properties owned by Wainwright. Wainwright was determined to rebuild.

Wainwright died in his home at 842 Union Street in Park Slope, Brooklyn, on August 14, 1904. The cause of death was an attack of gastritis.

== Sources ==
- Vincent F. Seyfried, The Long Island Rail Road: A Comprehensive History, Part Five, published by the author, Garden City, Long Island, 1966.
- Vincent F. Seyfried and William Asadorian, Old Rockaway, New York, in Early Photographs, Dover Publications, 2000.
