= James Remsen =

James S. "Uncle Jim" Remsen (October 1811, Queens Village, New York – August 21, 1887) was a landowner and developer of Rockaway Beach, Queens as a major amusement district in the 19th century. He is also known for his development of Canarsie and East New York in Brooklyn.

Remsen managed to acquire title to a large portion of the peninsula, and was known to promulgate a railroad project linking the Canarsie and East New York neighborhoods, which provided ferry passengers to Rockaway Beach. He took William Wainwright, who was to become a prominent Rockaway developer in his own right, as a partner in 1876.
