= Temple of Israel Synagogue (Queens) =

Church in Queens, New York

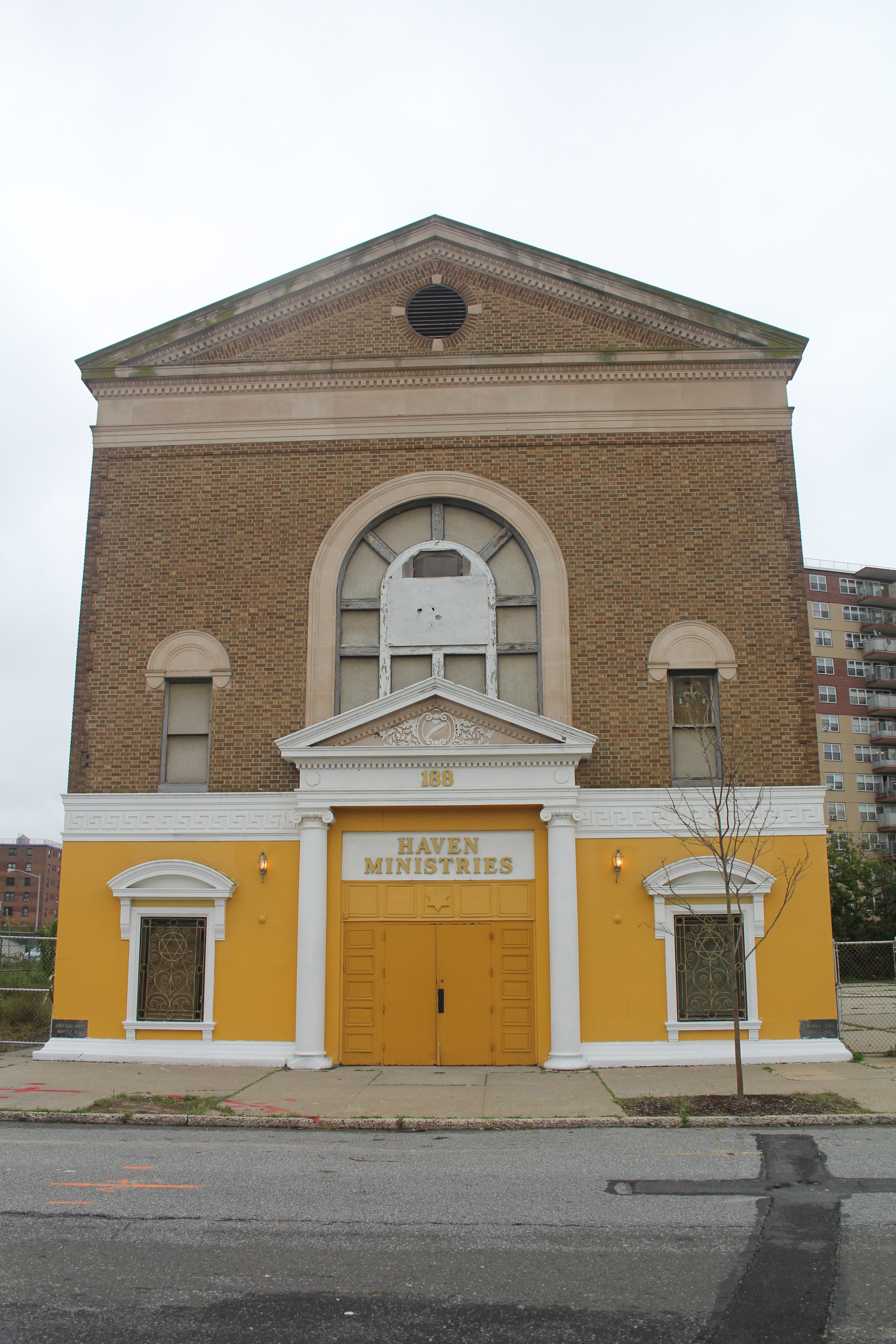
- The former synagogue, now church, in 2015

- Location of the former synagogue, now church, in New York City

Religion
- Affiliation: Reform Judaism (former); Pentecostalism (current)
- Ecclesiastical or organisational status: Synagogue (1921–2001); Church (since 2002)
- Status: Closed (as a synagogue); Repurposed (as a church)

Location
- Location: 1-88 Beach 84th Street, Rockaway, Queens, New York City, New York 11693
- Country: United States
- Coordinates: 40°35′14″N 73°48′34″W

Architecture
- Type: Synagogue architecture
- Style: Neoclassical
- Established: 1894 (as a congregation)
- Completed: 1900 (wooden synagogue); 1922 (brick synagogue)
- Temple of Israel Synagogue
- U.S. National Register of Historic Places
- Area: 0.18 acres (0.073 ha)
- NRHP reference No.: 13001156
- Added to NRHP: February 5, 2014

The Temple of Israel Synagogue is a historic former Reform Jewish congregation and synagogue located at 88 Beach 84th Street, Rockaway, Queens, New York City, New York, United States. The synagogue was "built in 1921 to replace an earlier synagogue that was destroyed by fire." In 2002 the building was acquired by Haven Ministries and used as a non-denominational Pentecostal church.

The building was listed on the National Register of Historic Places in 2014.

== History ==
Established as a congregation in 1894, as Beth Israel or Temple Israel, the initial wooden synagogue, at 10 South Fairview Avenue, was constructed in 1900. Destroyed by fire on December 18, 1920, a replacement synagogue building located in the Oakley Park subdivision was completed in September 1922, located on the same site (as the street had been renamed). It is a two-story, rectangular, steel frame and brick building in the Classical Revival style. The front gable façade features an elaborate main entry with Ionic order stone columns. The synagogue closed in 2001.

Subsequent to having closed as a synagogue, the building has been used as a Pentecostal church since 2002, occupied by Haven International Ministries.

== See also ==
- National Register of Historic Places listings in Queens, New York
