= Iron Steamboat Company =

Ferry service company between Manhattan and Coney Island (1881–1932)

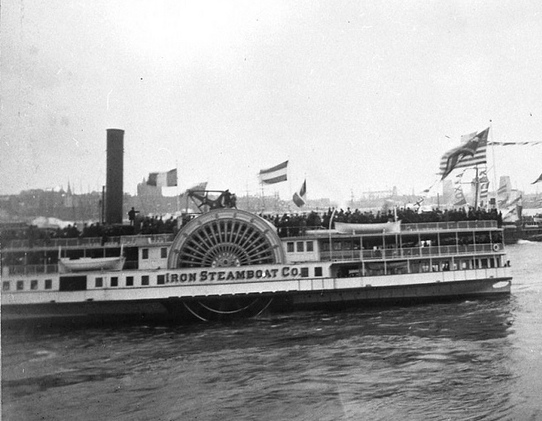
Iron Steamboat Co steamer

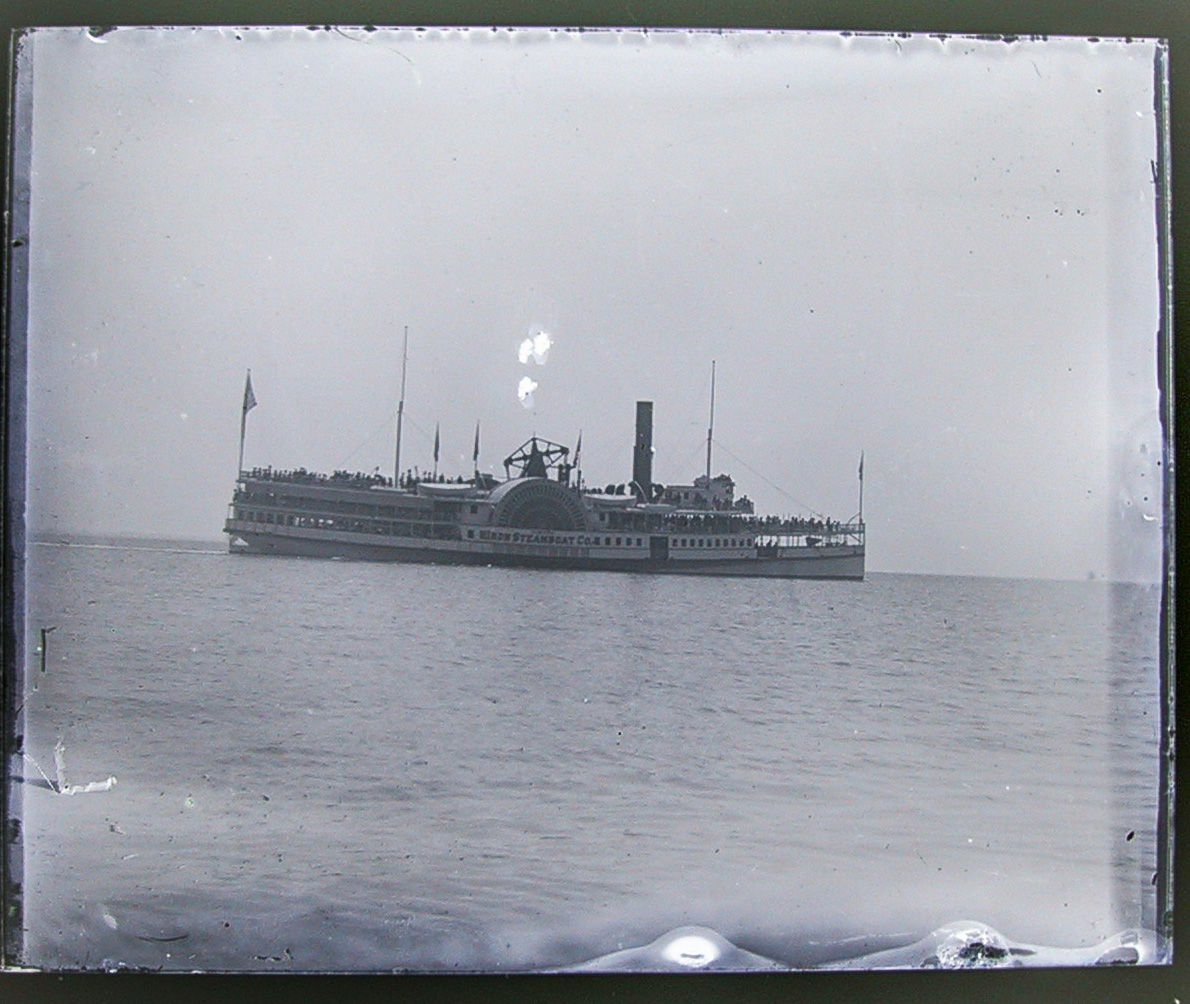
Iron Steamboat Co steamer

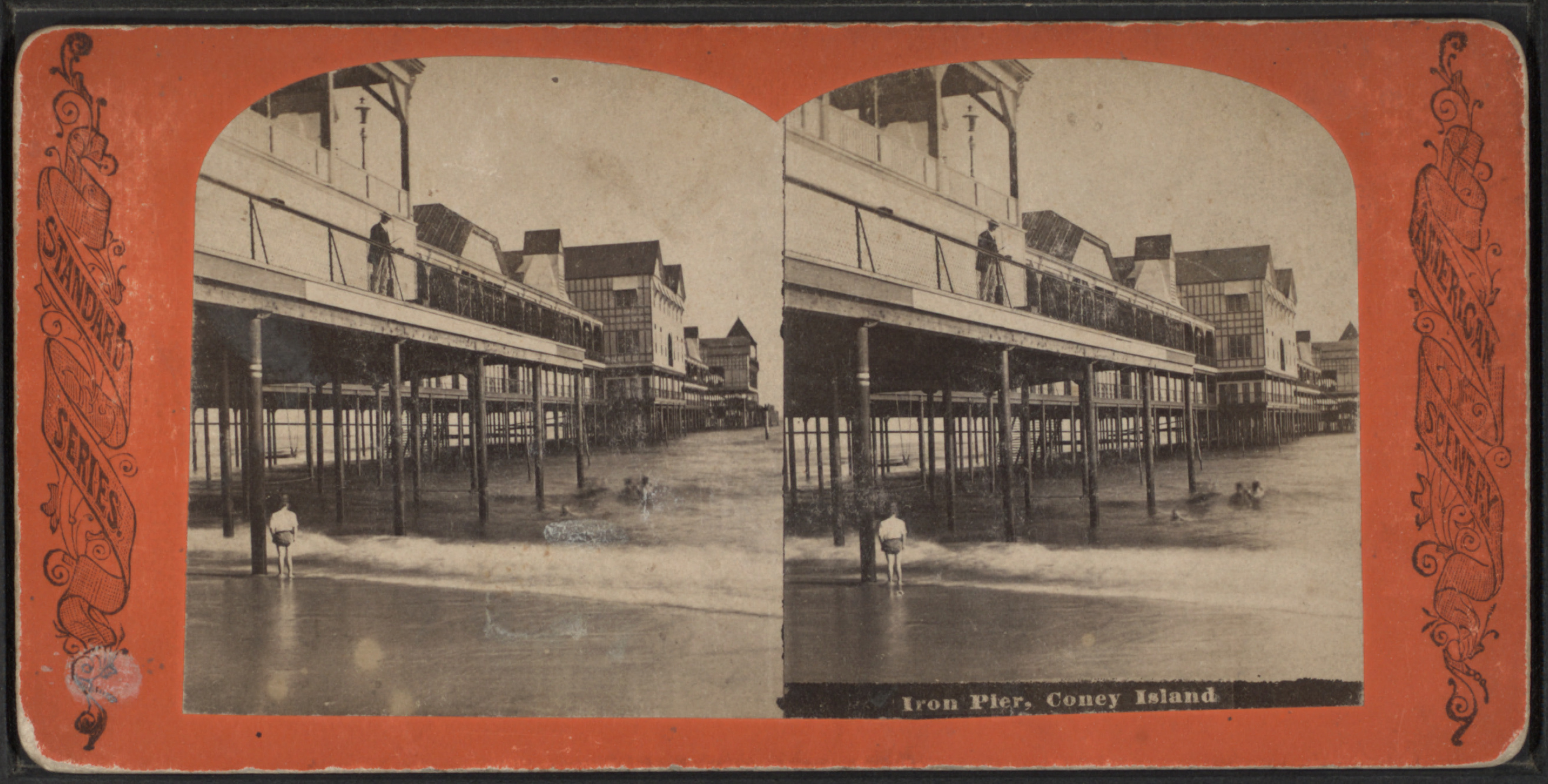
Stereo card of Iron Pier, Coney Island.

The Iron Steamboat Company (1881–1932) provided ferry service between Manhattan and Coney Island in New York City in the late 19th and early 20th centuries. The original fleet consisted of seven iron-hulled steamboats, each named after a constellation or a star: the Cygnus, the Cepheus, the Cetus, the Pegasus, the Perseus, the Sirius and the Taurus. In later years two older wooden steamboats, the Columbia and the Grand Republic would also be added. Each boat was powered by a single cylinder vertical beam steam engine and was divided into three decks and twelve watertight compartments. Service began in May 1881 and continued until the close of the 1932 season.

Initially the line serviced only Coney Island, but over the years service was expanded to Long Branch, New Jersey, Rockaway Beach, New York, and for a brief time Bay Ridge, Brooklyn and to the amusement park at Belden's Point, City Island, starting in June 1892. Boats left Manhattan (half-hourly during summer) from various piers along the west side and Pier One in Lower Manhattan. In Coney Island ships landed at the New and Old Iron Piers along the Coney Island Beach, and later at the amusement parks Dreamland and Steeplechase Park, where a round trip Iron Steamboat ticket bought free admission to the parks.

The company also ran a daily service up the Hudson to Oscawana Island north of Croton-on-Hudson, New York, where it operated a small hotel built over a railroad tunnel.

== Sources ==
- Cudahy, Brian J., Around Manhattan Island and Other Maritime Tales of New York
