= Hammel Houses =

Early public housing project in New York City

The Hammel Houses
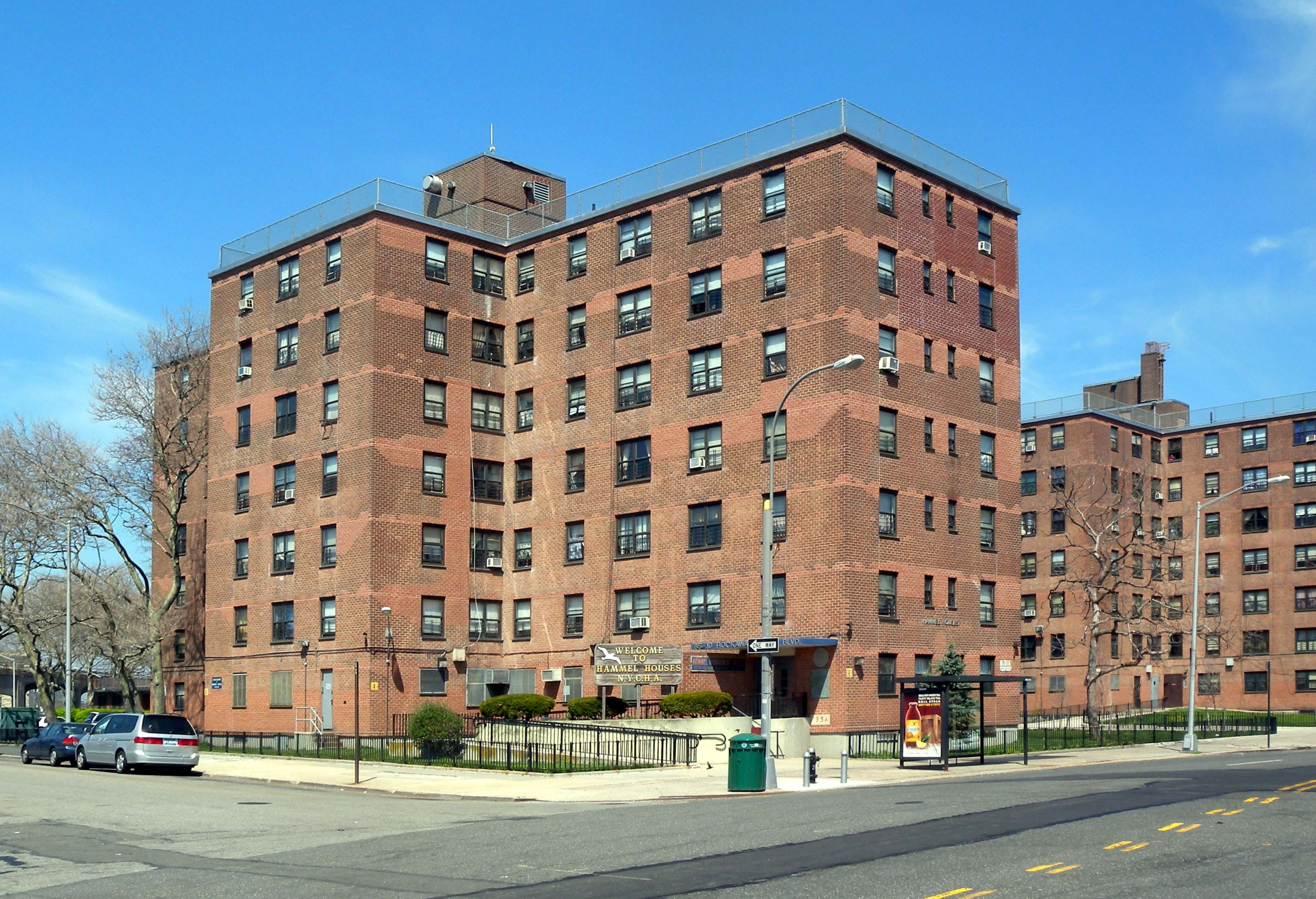

Project
- Completed: September, 1954
- Opening date: September, 1954
- Status: Completed
- Size: 712 units
- Developer: New York City Housing Authority
- Architect: John V. Dinan Associates
- Operator: New York City Housing Authority
- Owner: New York City Housing Authority

Physical features
- Major buildings: Fourteen
- Public spaces: A gymnasium, a playgroud
- Streets: Rockaway Beach Boulevard, Rockaway Freeway, Beach 86th Street, Beach Channel Drive, Beach 81st Street

Location
- Interactive map of Hammel Houses
- Address: 84-16 Rockaway Beach Boulevard, Far Rockaway, New York

Population
  - Total: 1,602

The Hammel Houses are a public housing project by the New York City Housing Authority. The project began in 1952 and consists of 712 apartments housing 1,602 residents in fourteen seven-story buildings. They are located in Hammels, Queens on the Rockaway peninsula just west of the Arverne by the Sea development.

== History ==
The general locale was named for Louis Hammel, who owned a hotel in the area and donated land in 1878 for construction of a railroad station which called Hammels station. The area picked up the name from the station and it began to develop as people took the train out from Manhattan and Brooklyn to live near or play at Rockaway beach. The rise of the automobile allowed people to travel to other beaches they liked more and the area declined as Hammels was patronized mostly by lower-income people.

== Development ==
The idea for the project was first announced at a Rockaway Chamber of Commerce dinner by a representative of the chairman of the New York City Housing Authority on January 28, 1951. By May of that year the City Planning Commission had approved the architectural plans for the project. Nearly a year later it filed the plans with the federal government. However, a cut proposed by Congress to the budget for the federally funded housing program threatened to end the project. Nevertheless, New York City bought the land for the Hammel Houses on July 16, 1952, making it one of the city's early housing projects. By July, 1954 the Authority was accepting residency applications, with construction expected to be completed in September. The first building opened on time, with a new building expected to open every succeeding month. A large playground was built the following year that featured slides, swings, a jungle gym, sand pit and wading pool.

== Super-storm Sandy ==
Hammel Houses suffered suffered damages to its services when water from Hurricane Sandy flooded the boiler room in Building 5, leaving it inoperable. The electrical services room in every building was wrecked by the storm surge. Water heaters and the plumbing that connected them and the boilers to the buildings and apartments was damaged or destroyed. Wiring and conduits for outdoor safety lights was also damaged or destroyed. All this was replaced and the electrical and plumbing services were raised above flood level. The Hammel gymnasium, important to the social fabric of the community, was damaged when flood waters burst through exterior walls of glass blocks and destroyed the wooden flooring, protective padding on the walls, and metal hinges, handles and fittings. Repairs took a year to complete. In 2015, salt left by encroaching flood waters corroded gas lines, causing them to burst and leaving residents without gas for at least three weeks.

== Crime and living conditions ==
In 2017 New York City Department of Investigation officers went undercover, either in plain clothes or dressed as Housing Authority employees, and successfully stole new or used major appliances from storerooms in six public housing facilities, including Hammel Houses. Returning investigators found site managers had no idea the equipment was even missing.

That same year a family moved into a three-bedroom apartment. They immediately found it needed repairs, reported this and deposited the keys with the management while they left for Christmas vacation. Upon their return they found their apartment emptied. Furniture, keepsakes, even immigration documents were missing. The security officer they reported this to found footage from the Housing Authority's surveillance cameras showing city employees removing the belongings and not returning them. They submitted a claim for $23,000 to replace their items and the city countered with an offer of $10,000. They haggled for $13,000 and when they finally accepted the $10,000 offer they were told the statute of limitations had expired, even though they had not been told there was such a statute, and they would get nothing. When investigative reporters contacted the Housing Authority, it immediately told the family they would receive the $10,000. No accounting was ever given for the missing belongings.

A Regional Plan Association report from July 2020 quoted several Hammel Houses residents voicing concerns about peeling paint, the presence of mold and lead in their homes, leaking plumbing and the poor quality of repairs.

On February 6, 2024 seventy New York City Housing Authority employees were charged with accepting bribes to award small contracts for repairs to public housing sites, including Hammel Houses. In order to speed up direly needed repairs, the City had allowed the Housing Authority to forego the bidding process for contracts of small monetary value. However, the seventy employees had taken in about two million dollars in illegal payment.
