= St. Rose of Lima Roman Catholic Church (Queens) =

St. Rose of Lima Church
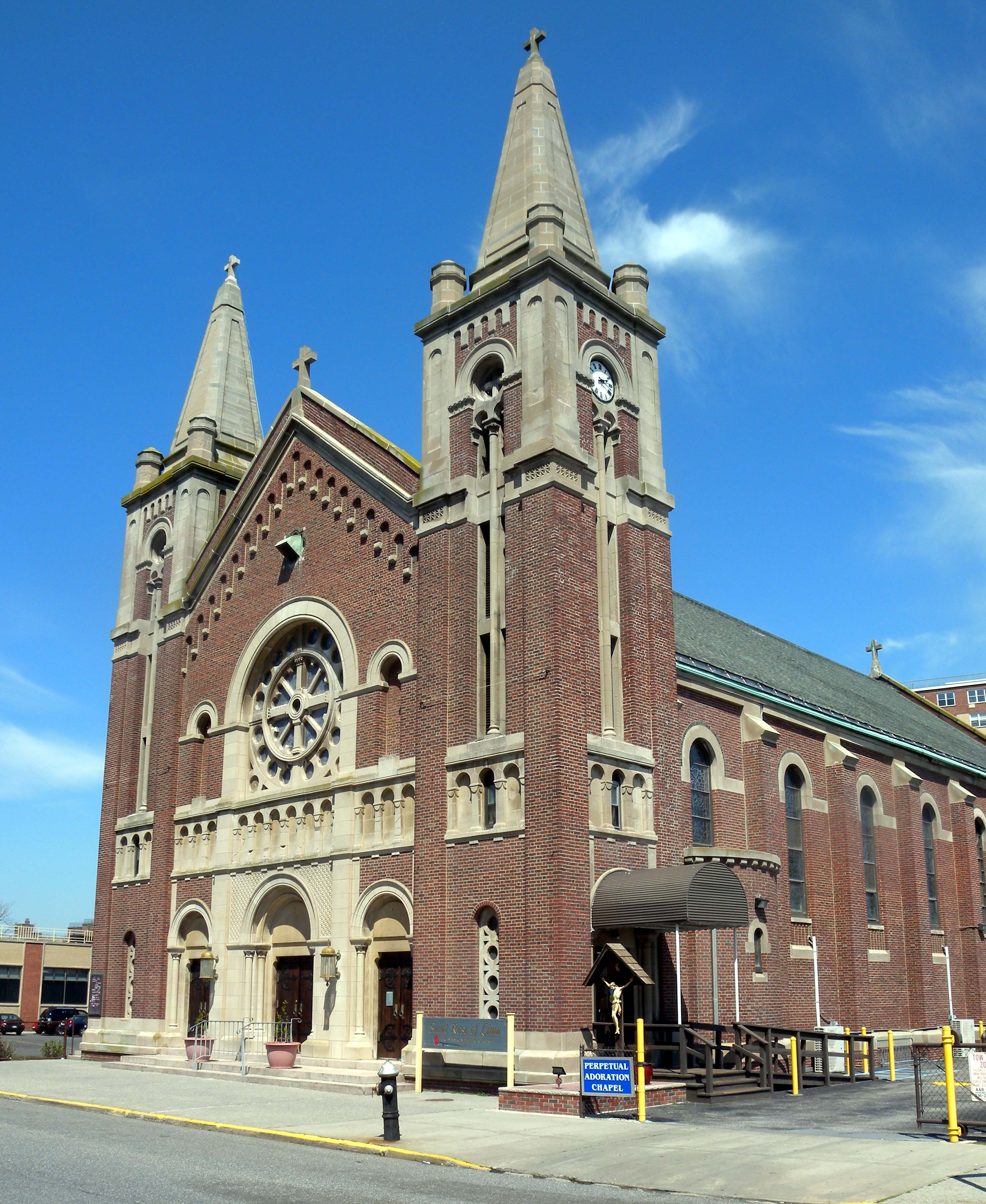
- View from the south west on Beach 84th Street, April 2009.
- St. Rose of Lima Church
- 40°35′10″N 73°48′34″W
- Location: Rockaway Beach, Queens, New York City
- Address: 130 Beach 84th Street, Rockaway Beach, New York, 11693
- Country: United States
- Language(s): English, Spanish, Polish
- Denomination: Catholic Church
- Tradition: Latin Church
- Website: St. Rose of Lima Queens.org

History
- Status: Parish church
- Dedication: Saint Rose of Lima
- Dedicated: September 27, 1907
- Earlier dedication: August 30, 1886
- Consecrated: September 27, 1907

Architecture
- Functional status: Active
- Architect: John W. Ingle
- Architectural type: Church
- Style: Romanesque Revival
- Construction cost: US$125,000 (current building), US$6,000 (first building)

Specifications
- Capacity: 800 (current building), 500 (first building)

Administration
- Diocese: Roman Catholic Diocese of Brooklyn
- Deanery: Queens 10 Deanery

Clergy
- Pastor(s): Fr. James Rodriguez; Fr. Daniel K. Rajski, Part Time Parochial Vicar

Saint Rose of Lima Roman Catholic Church is a Catholic church located at 130 Beach 84th Street in Rockaway Beach, Queens New York. It is a currently active parish church within the Roman Catholic Diocese of Brooklyn, and masses are celebrated in English, Spanish, and Polish. The parish was founded on August 30, 1886, and the old church building was one of the first Catholic Churches built on the Rockaway peninsula.

Before the founding of St. Rose of Lima parish between 1847 and 1884, Catholics in Rockaway beach had to attended Mass in Far Rockaway. Prior to 1847, Rockaway Catholics had to journey to Jamaica, Queens, to attend Mass. In 1884, the Rev. Anthony Farley of St. Monica's Church, Jamaica, was delegated to celebrate one Mass on Sundays. In that year Mass was celebrated at various places in Rockaway Beach – first at Datz's Hotel, then at Curley's Hotel and then at an old school house.

== Building ==
=== Current building ===
Groundbreaking for the current Romanesque Revival style church building took place on July 1, 1906, and the first Mass and dedication inside the new church took place on September 27, 1907. John W. Ingle was the architect of this church. It has a seating capacity of 800, and the cost of construction was US$125,000.

=== First building ===
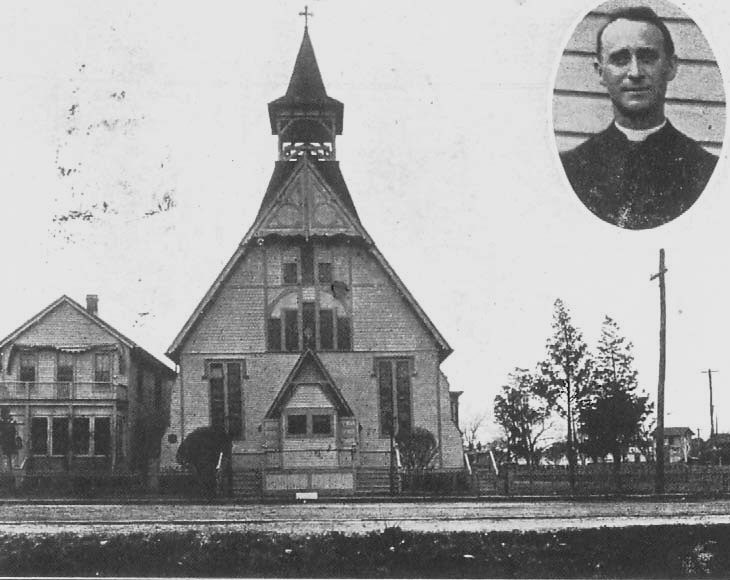
Photograph of the front of the first St. Rose of Lima Roman Catholic Church building that was built in 1886. The photograph was taken in 1906. The inset is of Father Henry F. Murray, who was pastor of St. Rose of Lima from 1900 to 1911.

The first church building, built on Fairview Avenue (modern day Beach 84th Street) and Barry Place, near the Long Island Railroad, was 50 x 100 feet. It could hold 500 worshippers and cost $6,000 to build. A small cul-de-sac in back of the Hammel project marks the site of the first building at present. The first Mass was celebrated in the first building on August 30, 1886.

== School ==
St. Rose of Lima Catholic Academy is a private, Catholic school with a campus located on Beach 84th Street right next to the current St. Rose of Lima church building. The academy has 428 students in grades Pre-Kindergarten to eight grade with a student-teacher ratio of 15 to 1. Mr. Peter Vercessi is the current principal.

The School was first opened by the Presentation Sisters as St. Rose of Lima School in September 1966. The building program for the school and convent was started in 1963 and was completed in 1966. The dedication of these buildings took place on Sunday, May 15, 1966. The first principal was Sister Eleanor O’Donnell and the first school included classes in grades first through fifth. The first graduation was on June 20, 1970. The School became St. Rose of Lima Catholic Academy on September 1, 2013.

== Pastors ==
Father Edward J. O’Connell, 1886-1895 ✠

Father Thomas J. McCaffrey, 1895-1900 ✠

Father Henry F. Murray, 1900-1911 ✠

Father John P. Wilson, 1911-1912 ✠

Father James J. Bennett, 1912-1921 ✠

Father John F. Stack, 1921-1953 ✠

Father Pierce V. Brennan (Adm.), 1953-1954 ✠

Father Charles T. Carow, 1954-1956 ✠

Father Patrick J. McLaughlin, 1956-1957 ✠

Father Joseph J. Tschantz, 1957-1961 ✠

Father John B. Smith, 1961-1965 ✠

Father James F. McDonald, 1965-1971 ✠

Father Karl M. Michel, 1971-1978 ✠

Father James T. Devine, 1978–1988

Msgr. James P. Grace, 1988-1993 ✠

Father Peter D. Gillen, 1993–2007 ✠

Msgr. James F. Spengler, 2007-2015 ✠

Father Wladyslaw Z. Kubrak (Adm.), 2014–2016

Father James A. Kuroly, 2016 – 2019

Father James Rodriguez, 2019–present

✠ – Deceased
