= Landia station =

Train station in New York, US (1952–73)

Landia

General information
- Location: South side of Robbins Lane; Syosset, New York
- Coordinates: 40°47′51.3″N 73°30′54.1″W
- Owner: Long Island Rail Road
- Platforms: 1
- Tracks: 2

History
- Opened: May 15, 1952; 74 years ago
- Closed: October 3, 1973; 53 years ago

Services
| Preceding station | Long Island Rail Road | Following station |
Former services
| Hicksville toward Penn Station, Grand Central or Long Island City | Port Jefferson Branch | Syosset toward Huntington or Port Jefferson |
Location

Landia is a former station on the Long Island Rail Road's Port Jefferson Branch, located on Robbins Lane in the Locust Grove section of Syosset, within Nassau County, Long Island, New York, United States.

== History ==
The station was opened on December 15, 1952 for the Fairchild Camera & Instrument Corporation, which had recently moved from Queens to Syosset. Its purpose was to provide transportation to work for Fairchild employees who still lived in Queens and did not own automobiles.

Service to Landia was halted on June 26, 1972, as the station did not have high-level platforms to accommodate the LIRR's new M1 railcars, which did not have stairs to allow for passengers to board from grade-level. In 1970, ridership at the station consisted of two daily passengers. On October 3, 1973, the station closed permanently, with officials concluding that upgrading the station to include high-level platforms for the new M1s was financially impractical, given the low ridership.

=== Future ===
Reopening the Landia station has been proposed as a solution to the gap problem at the Syosset station slightly to the northeast, as Landia is located along a straight portion of track instead of the curved section at Syosset.

== See also ==
- History of the Long Island Rail Road
- Republic station
