= Cold Spring Harbor station =

Long Island Rail Road station in Suffolk County, New York

Cold Spring Harbor
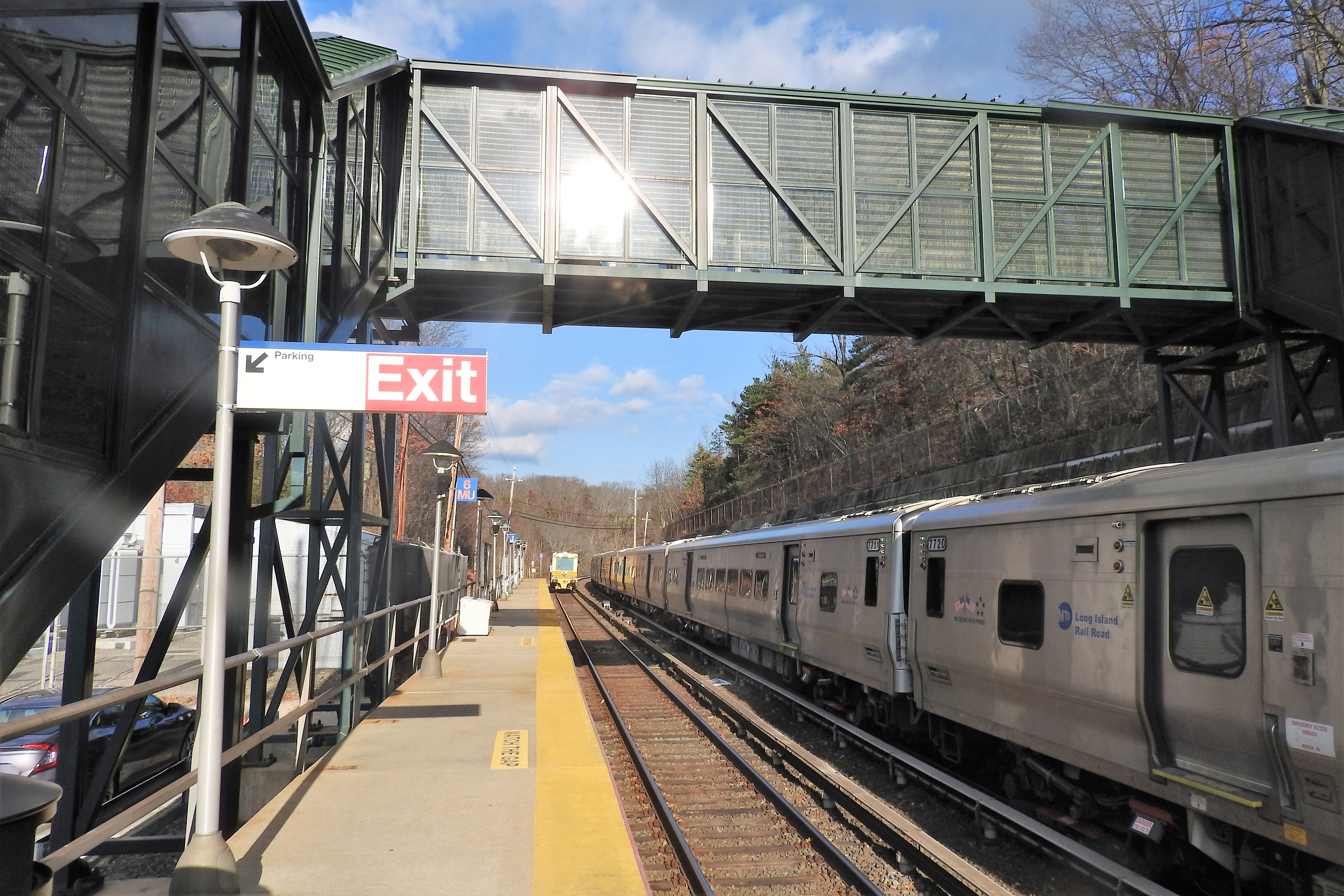
- The Cold Spring Harbor station in 2018

General information
- Location: West Pulaski Road and East Gate Drive; West Hills, New York
- Coordinates: 40.835056°N 73.451611°W
- Owner: Long Island Rail Road
- Platforms: 2 side platforms
- Tracks: 2
- Connections: NYS Bike Route 25A

Construction
- Parking: Yes; Town of Huntington residential permits
- Cycle facilities: Yes; Bike Racks and Lockers
- Accessible: Partially ADA-accessible (Platform A)

Other information
- Station code: CSH
- Fare zone: 9

History
- Opened: 1901 or 1902
- Rebuilt: 1948
- Electrified: October 19, 1970; 750 V (DC) third rail
- Former names: Woodbury (1875–1880)

Passengers
- 2012—2014: 2,809 per weekday

Services
Preceding station	Long Island Rail Road	Following station
Syosset toward Penn Station or Grand Central	Port Jefferson Branch electric service	Huntington Terminus
Syosset toward Penn Station or Long Island City	Port Jefferson Branch diesel service	Huntington toward Port Jefferson
Former services
Preceding station	Long Island Rail Road	Following station
Syosset toward Hicksville	Wading River Branch	Huntington toward Wading River
Location

Cold Spring Harbor is a station on the Long Island Rail Road's Port Jefferson Branch. It is located at West Pulaski Road (CR 11) and East Gate Drive, just south of Woodbury Road in West Hills, Suffolk County, New York.

== History ==
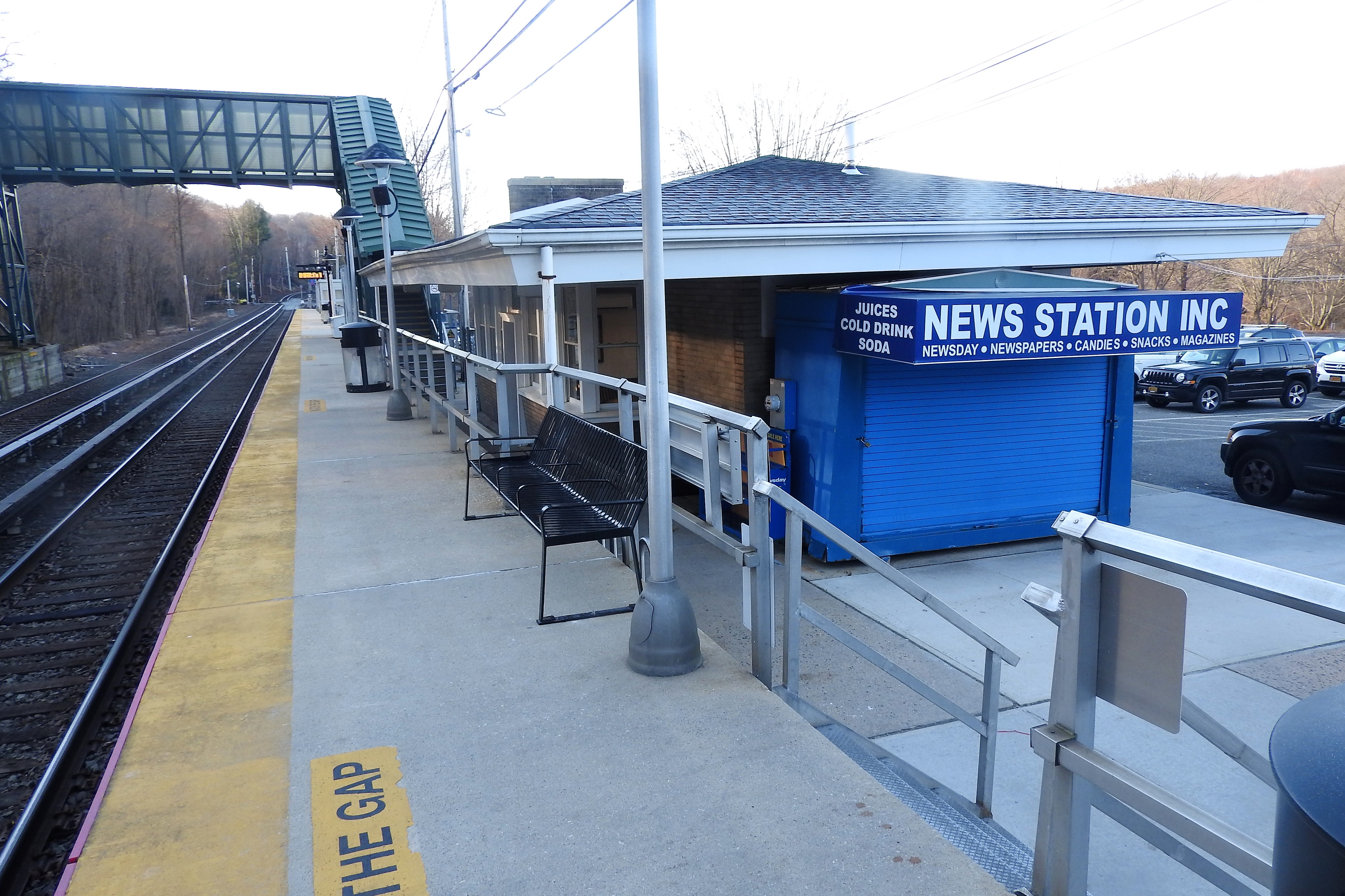
The westbound platform, with the station house visible at center-right.

In December 1875, a station was built in the nearby community of Woodbury, in Nassau (then Queens) County, as "Woodbury station", as an extension of the Hicksville and Syosset Railroad. It was renamed "Cold Spring station" on October 15, 1880, when the southern portion of what is now the Village of Laurel Hollow was still known as Cold Spring.

At some point between 1901 and 1902, the station was moved east to the present-day Cold Springs Hills section of the hamlet of West Hills and assumed its current name of Cold Spring Harbor.

The station was reconstructed in 1948, during which time the current station house was erected. In 1970, the station was electrified, along with the rest of the Port Jefferson Branch between Mineola and Huntington.

Since 2007, the station has served as the western terminus of New York State Bicycle Route 25A.

== Station layout ==
The station has two high-level side platforms. Platform A is 12 cars long and Platform B is eight cars long. One westbound morning train and three eastbound evening trains stop at the opposite platform.
