= Kings Park station (LIRR) =

Long Island Rail Road station in Suffolk County, New York

Kings Park
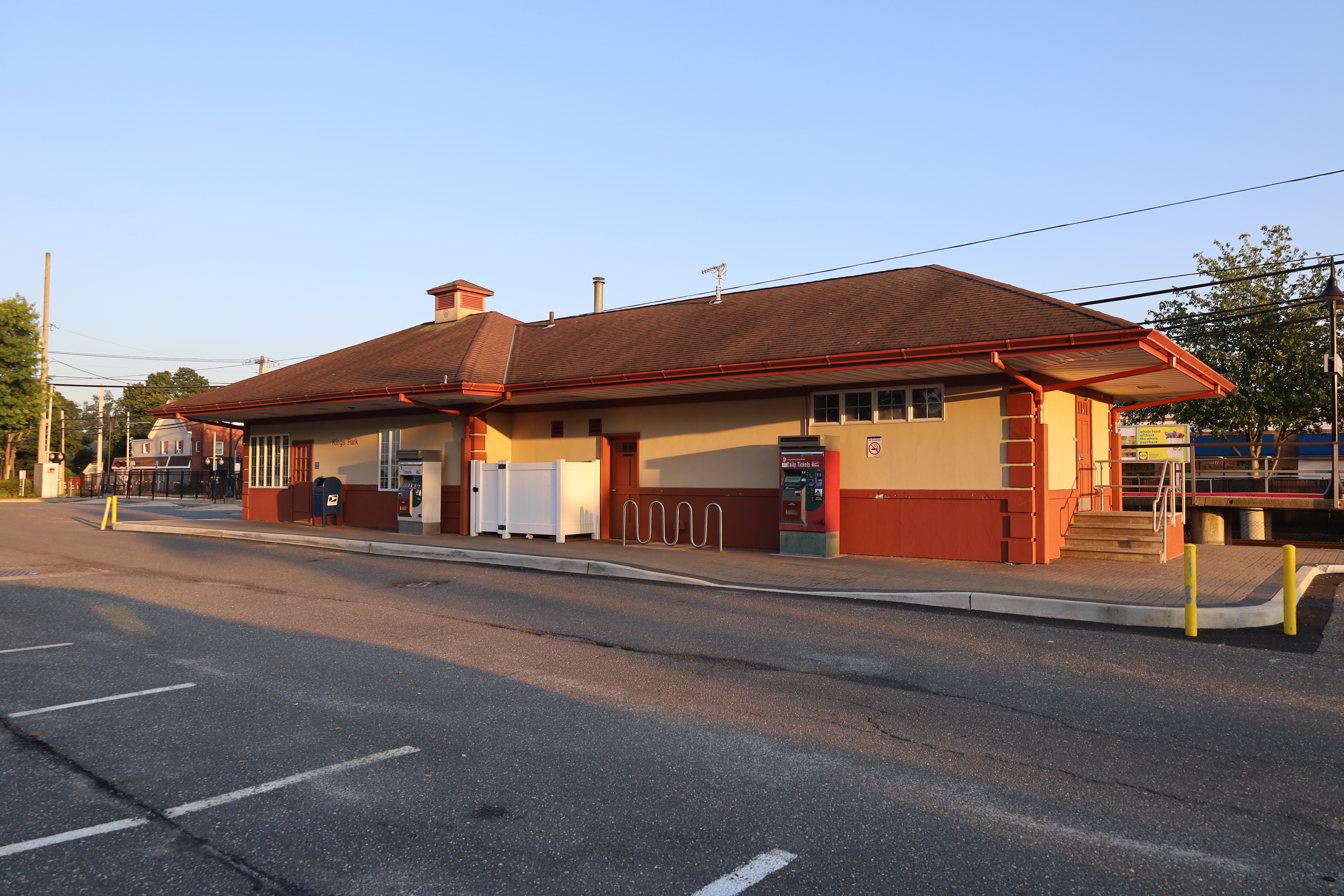
- Kings Park station house in 2021

General information
- Location: Indian Head Road (CR 14) and Main Street (NY 25A); Kings Park, New York
- Coordinates: 40°53′1.39″N 73°15′20.95″W
- Owner: Long Island Rail Road
- Platforms: 2 side platforms
- Tracks: 2
- Connections: Suffolk County Transit: Kings Park On-Demand Zone

Construction
- Parking: Yes; Free
- Cycle facilities: Yes
- Accessible: Yes

Other information
- Station code: KPK
- Fare zone: 10

History
- Opened: 1872
- Rebuilt: 1948
- Former names: St. Johnsland (1872–1891)

Passengers
- 2012—2014: 1,484 per weekday

Services
Preceding station	Long Island Rail Road	Following station
Northport toward Penn Station or Long Island City	Port Jefferson Branch diesel service	Smithtown toward Port Jefferson
Former services
Preceding station	Long Island Rail Road	Following station
Northport toward Hicksville	Wading River Branch	Smithtown toward Wading River
Terminus	Kings Park spur	Kings Park State Hospital Terminus
Location

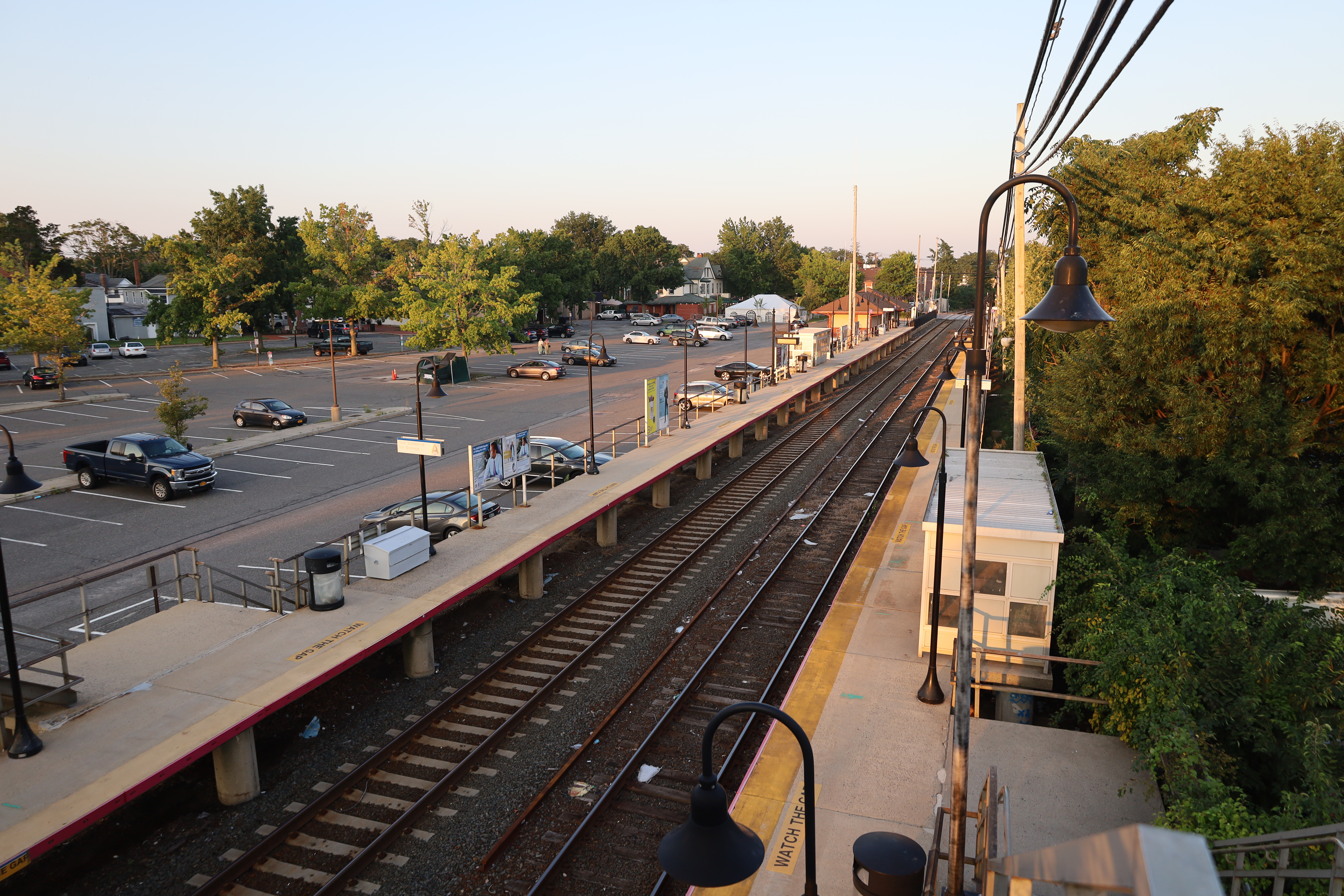
Tracks and platforms in 2021

Kings Park is a station on the Port Jefferson Branch of the Long Island Rail Road. It is located at the southwest corner of Suffolk County Route 14 (Indian Head Road) and NY 25A (Main Street) in Kings Park, New York.

== History ==
Originally known as St. Johnsland station when it was built by Charles Hallett of Riverhead for the Smithtown and Port Jefferson Railroad between November and December 1872, it was renamed Kings Park station in June 1891. The Kings Park area was the site of a major derailment on February 16, 1947, but there were no casualties. The station was rebuilt in 1948 with an attached freight storage area, and rebuilt again during the 1990s. Kings Park station also had a spur called the Kings Park Psychiatric Center Spur to the former Kings Park Psychiatric Center, which was originally built in 1896, and officially decommissioned in 1971, although trains were used to bring coal to the hospital until 1987. Today the right-of-way serves as the Kings Park Hike and Bike Trail, which leads to the Nissequogue River State Park.

== Station layout ==
This station has two high-level side platforms, each 12 cars long. On either side of the station, the tracks merge into a single track.
