= Syosset station =

Long Island Rail Road station in Nassau County, New York

Syosset
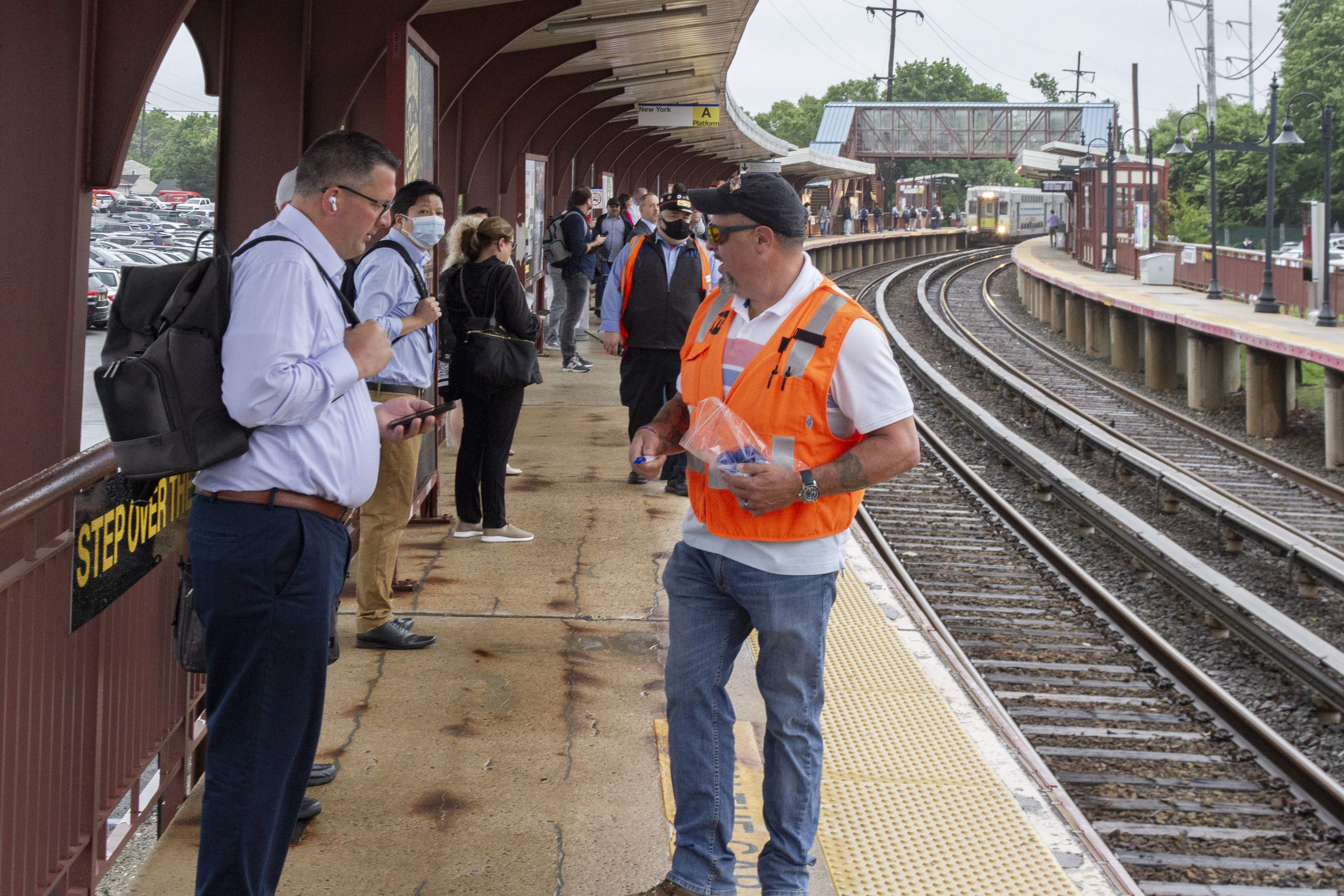
- Syosset station in 2022, showing the curved platform

General information
- Location: Jackson Avenue and Underhill Boulevard; Syosset, New York
- Coordinates: 40.824892°N 73.500492°W
- Owner: Long Island Rail Road
- Platforms: 2 side platforms
- Tracks: 2
- Bus operators: Nassau Inter-County Express
- Connections: Nice Mini: Syosset

Construction
- Parking: Yes (permit required)
- Cycle facilities: Yes
- Accessible: Yes

Other information
- Station code: SYT
- Fare zone: 7

History
- Opened: 1854
- Rebuilt: 1872, 1877, 1944, 1948, 2018–2019
- Electrified: October 19, 1970; 750 V (DC) third rail

Passengers
- 2012–2014: 6,041 per weekday

Services
Preceding station	Long Island Rail Road	Following station
Hicksville toward Penn Station, Grand Central or Long Island City	Port Jefferson Branch	Cold Spring Harbor toward Huntington or Port Jefferson
Former services
Preceding station	Long Island Rail Road	Following station
Landia toward Hicksville	Wading River Branch	Cold Spring Harbor toward Wading River
Location

Syosset station is a commuter rail station on the Long Island Rail Road's Port Jefferson Branch in Syosset, New York. It is located at Jackson Avenue and Underhill Boulevard, south of New York State Route 25A, but north of Jericho Turnpike and the Long Island Expressway. Syosset's downtown was built around the station. There are no connections to NICE buses at the station, though taxi service is available.

== Location ==
The Syosset station is located in the hamlet of the same name, within the Town of Oyster Bay. Located approximately 30.9 mi (50 km) east of Pennsylvania Station by rail, the station is at the southeast edge of the town center, on the east side of Jackson Avenue near its intersection with Underhill Boulevard.

== History ==
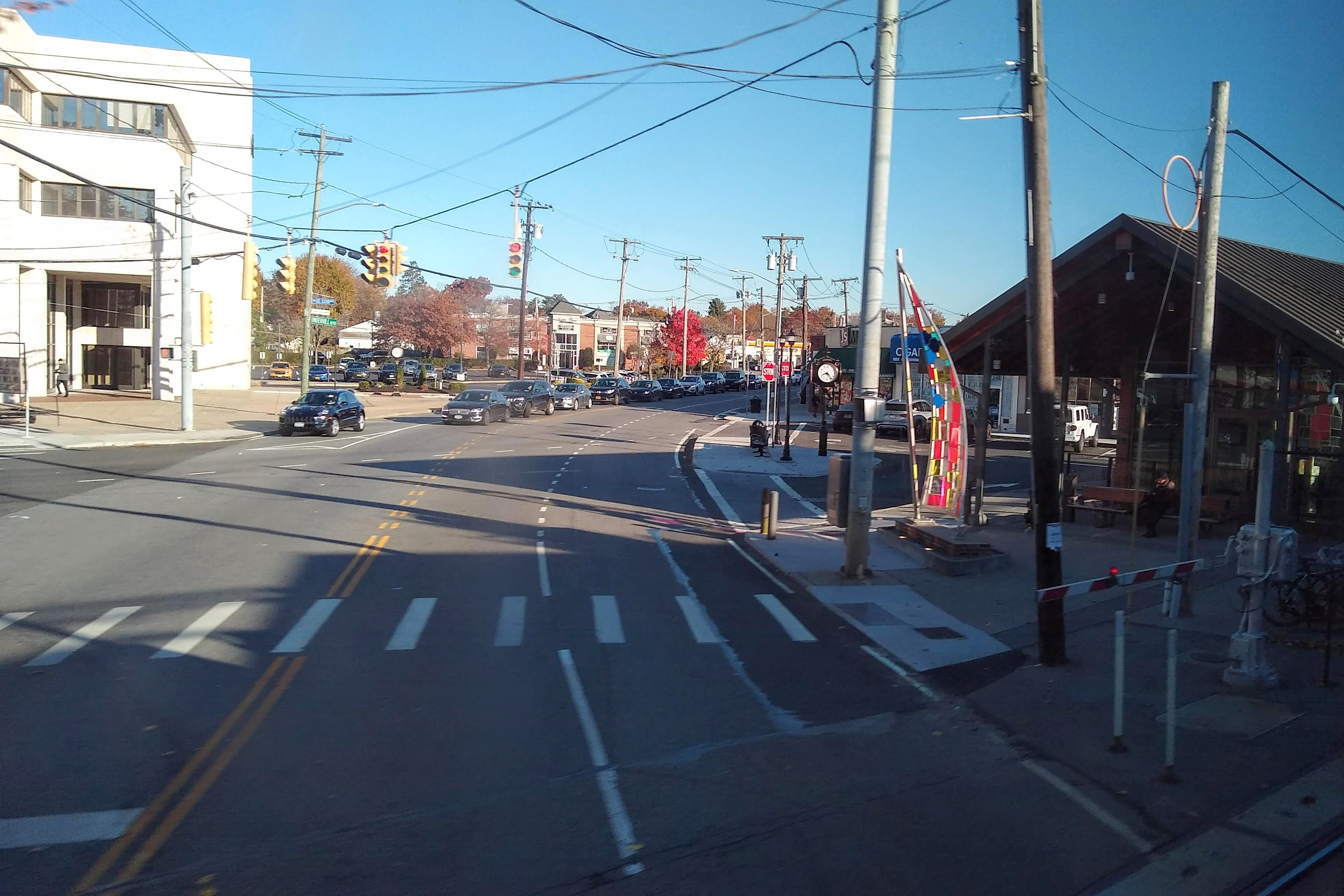
Jackson Avenue crossing, west of the station. The new station house and Sail sculpture are visible.

Syosset station was initially built by the Hicksville and Syosset Railroad in 1854. The station's former building was built in 1872. The building's first location was at Lockwood's Grove station, on the former Cedarhurst Cut-off. The LIRR moved the building to Syosset station in 1877, as the Far Rockaway – Lockwood's Grove station had since been abandoned. The building was renovated in 1944, then torn down and replaced in 1948. In 1970 the station was electrified, along with the rest of the Port Jefferson Branch between Mineola and Huntington stations.

The station was again renovated from October 2018 to June 2019. This renovation included a new station house and a sculpture known as "Sail", designed by Tom Fruin. Digital signage with real-time information was also added to the station.

=== Transit-oriented development ===
The Town of Oyster Bay has designated Syosset station as one of its targets for transit-oriented development. Known as the "Syosset Downtown Redevelopment and Revitalization Plan," the project aims to re-create the hamlet's downtown through mixed-use development and improved human-scale zoning regulations. The master-plan includes suggestions such as removing the grade crossing at Jackson Avenue, creating a pedestrian plaza by eliminating road traffic on a portion of Cold Spring Road, parking reconfiguration, and the building of a community center as ways of focusing growth in the downtown area and reducing unnecessary trips by car.

== Station layout ==
Syosset has two high-level side platforms, each 12 cars long. The station is on a curve, necessitating a wider-than-normal gap between the platform and the train. At places where train doors open, most of the gaps span ten inches or more; some gaps measure 15 inches. Black ice may cause commuters to fall into the gap. On January 30, 1996, in separate incidents, three commuters in 90 minutes fell into the gap at the station due to icy platform conditions.

The LIRR has installed platform gap lighting and camera surveillance systems, and new platform sections have shifted from the current location to remedy the gap situation. The LIRR has also added platform conductors to monitor train boarding, instruct crews to announce the gap at the station, and assist passengers. Further improvements, including changing railroad operation standards and the viable use of retractable gap fillers (such as those used in a few New York City Subway stations) were examined. The railroad also retained a consultant to review train operations to suggest further changes.

In the 2000s, numerous Syosset-area residents and politicians, such as former Nassau County Presiding Officer Judy Jacobs argued the best solution to eliminate the gap problem would be to force the LIRR to close the Syosset station and reopen the Landia station to the southwest; Landia is on a straight track. A mall had also been proposed near the Landia station site. Michael Pally, an MTA board member representing Suffolk County and who also worked for a real estate firm that represented the company that proposed the construction of the mall, believed the Syosset station should be closed because more parking spaces would be available at Landia. Opponents of the mall argued that opening Landia while closing Syosset would be a ruse to direct people to the mall. The Town of Oyster Bay, which at the time controlled the Landia station site, gathered information before determining whether to ask the LIRR to conduct a study.
