= Smithtown station =

Long Island Rail Road station in Suffolk County, New York

Smithtown
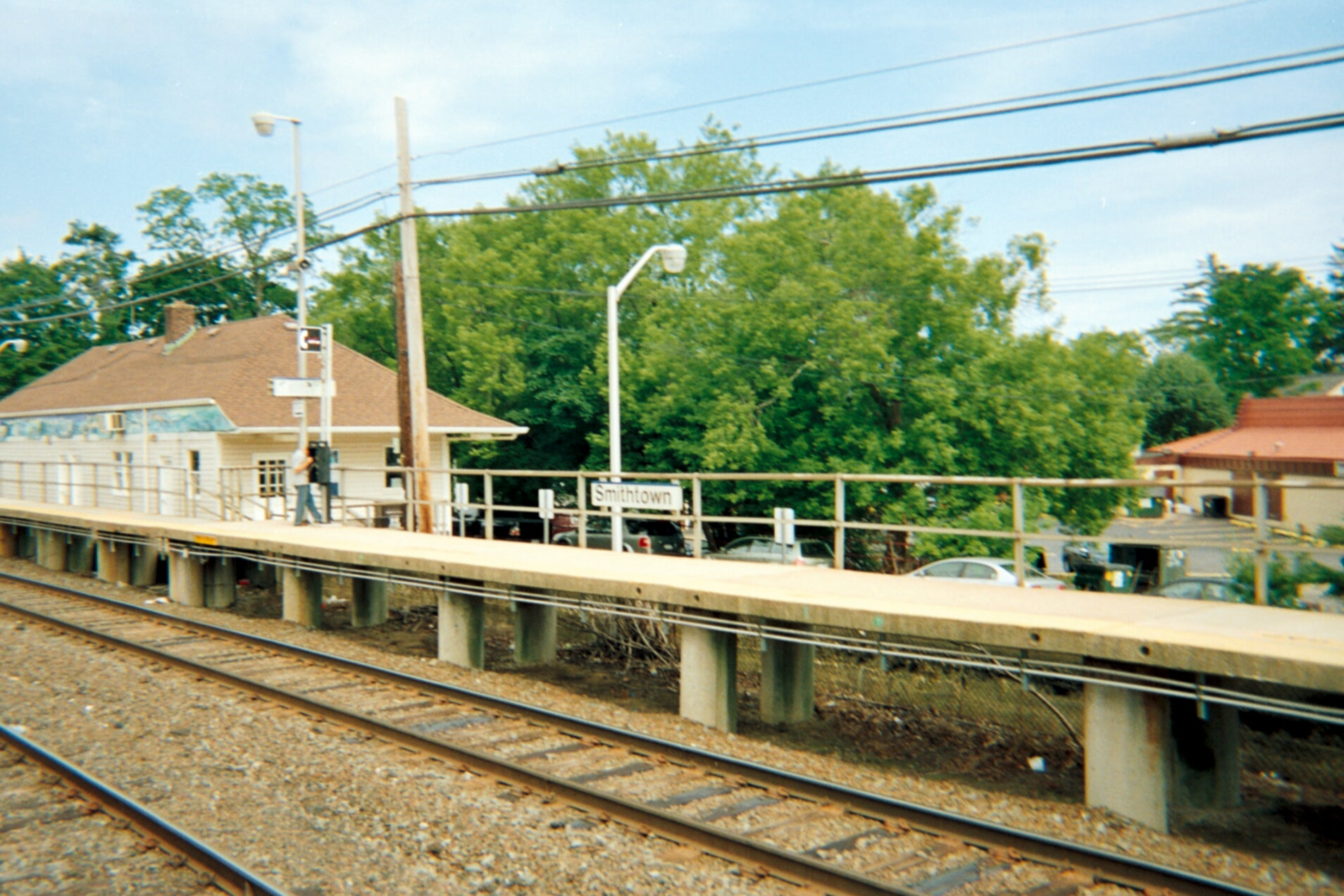
- Eastern view of the Smithtown station house

General information
- Location: Redwood Lane; Smithtown, New York
- Coordinates: 40°51′22.55″N 73°11′57.38″W
- Owner: Long Island Rail Road
- Platforms: 2 side platforms
- Tracks: 2
- Connections: Suffolk County Transit: 5, 56

Construction
- Parking: Yes; Free and Town of Smithtown permits
- Cycle facilities: Yes; Bike Rack
- Accessible: Yes

Other information
- Station code: STN
- Fare zone: 10

History
- Opened: 1873
- Rebuilt: 1937

Passengers
- 2012–2014: 904 per weekday

Services
Preceding station	Long Island Rail Road	Following station
Kings Park toward Penn Station or Long Island City	Port Jefferson Branch diesel service	St. James toward Port Jefferson
Former services
Preceding station	Long Island Rail Road	Following station
Kings Park toward Hicksville	Wading River Branch	St. James toward Wading River
Location

Smithtown is a station on the Port Jefferson Branch of the Long Island Rail Road. The station is located off a low bridge over NY 25 / 25A along Redwood Lane between NY 25 / 25A and Landing Avenue in Smithtown, New York.

== History ==
Smithtown station was originally built in 1873 by Charles Hallett of Riverhead for the Smithtown and Port Jefferson Railroad. In 1937, the station was rebuilt, and the grade crossing at Main Street (NY 25/NY 25A) immediately west of the station was eliminated. A freight spur exists west of the bridge under Brooksite Drive.

The station contains a mural along the track side of the station called "Nissequogue Passages," by Robert Carioscia, which was sponsored by the Smithtown Township Arts Council in 1989.

== Station layout ==
This station has two high-level side platforms, each 12 cars long. On either end of the station, however, the tracks merge. Most trains utilize Platform B, with select trains using Platform A to allow two trains to bypass each other through the station.
