= Payomatic =

New York financial retailer

PAYOMATIC
- PAYOMATIC's logo since 2018

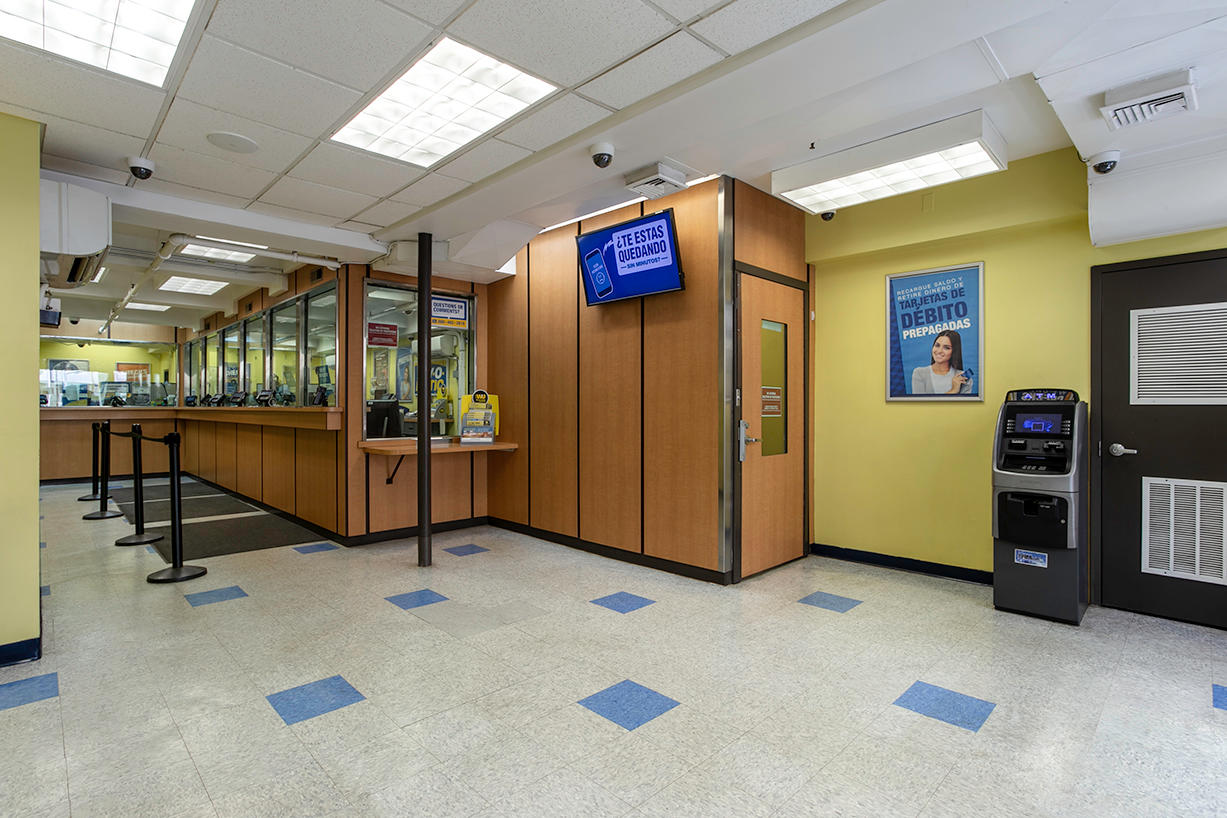
- Customer waiting area and teller windows inside PAYOMATIC store located at 590 Eight Ave New York, NY 10018
- Formerly: PAY-O-MATIC (1970 - 2017)
- Type: Private
- Industry: Financial services
- Founded: 1958; 68 years ago
- Headquarters: 160 Oak Drive, Syosset, New York, U.S.
- Number of locations: 148; (FY JAN 1, 2018)
- Area served: New York metropolitan area
- Key people: Jay Guskind (President & CEO)
- Products: Check Cashing; Business Check Cashing; inPOWER Prepaid Mastercard®; Western Union Money Transfers; Bill Payment; Western Union Money Orders; Prepaid Top-ups; Many Other Services
- Number of employees: ~1,000
- Parent: FEF Cash Inc. (2008–present)
- Subsidiaries: Rapid Armored Corporation; POM Electronic Payment Systems
- Website: www.payomatic.com

Payomatic was a consumer financial services retailer with 148 stores located throughout the New York metropolitan area. The company was founded in 1958 and was New York’s largest provider of check cashing and financial services, handling nearly 20 million transactions annually.

Payomatic provided check cashing services, money transfers, money orders, bill payments, prepaid debit cards and a variety of other convenience services. The company was headquartered in Syosset, NY.

== History ==
The Payomatic Corporation was founded in 1958, and was originally known as Paymaster Corporation. The name was changed to Payomatic in 1970.

In 2008, New York-based private equity firm Founders Equity Inc. acquired the outstanding shares of the Payomatic Corporation, and all assets of C.L.B. Check Cashing Inc., through an investment vehicle, FEF Cash Inc. The Payomatic and C.L.B. businesses were combined and operated under the Payomatic name, creating the leading check-cashing and related financial services company in the state of New York.

Payomatic also owned and operates Rapid Armored Corporation, an armored car carrier subsidiary which has served banks, retailers, ATM networks and large businesses for more than 45 years.

Payomatic was a member of Financial Service Centers of New York, the professional trade association representing New York’s licensed check cashing industry.
