= Syosset Central School District =

School district in New York, United States

Address
- 99 Pell Lane Syosset, New York, 11791; United States

District information
- Type: Public
- Grades: K–12
- NCES District ID: 3628560

Students and staff
- Students: 6,578 (2020–2021)
- Teachers: 675.85 (on an FTE basis)
- Staff: 566.2 (on an FTE basis)
- Student–teacher ratio: 9.73:1

Other information
- Website: www.syossetschools.org

The Syosset Central School District serves the inhabitants of Syosset, a suburb in Nassau County, New York, on Long Island. It also serves the neighboring suburb of Woodbury, as well as parts of Plainview, Jericho, Muttontown, Oyster Bay Cove, and Hicksville. In the 2027 rankings, the Syosset Central School District was ranked the #2 best school in New York and #3 in the United States. The district operates ten schools.

== Schools ==
=== High schools ===
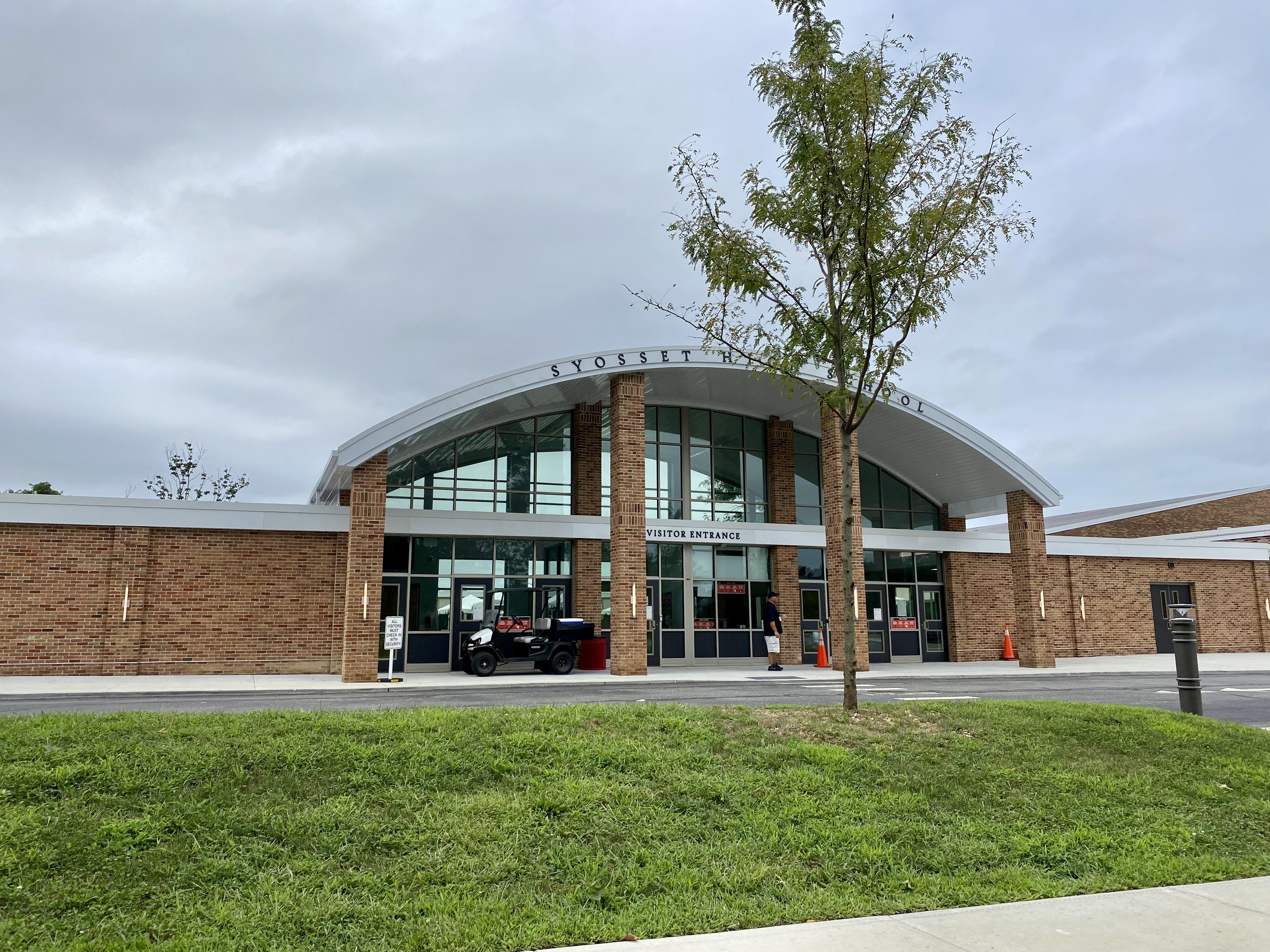
Syosset High School in 2021

- Syosset High School
  70 South Woods Road
  Syosset, NY 11791

=== Middle schools ===
- Harry B. Thompson Middle School
  98 Ann Drive
  Syosset, NY 11791
- South Woods Middle School
  99 Pell Lane
  Syosset, NY 11791

=== Elementary schools ===
- Alice P. Willits Elementary School
  99 Nana Place
  Syosset, NY 11791
- Berry Hill Elementary School
  181 Cold Spring Road
  Syosset, NY 11791
- J. Irving Baylis Elementary School
  580 Woodbury Road
  Plainview, NY 11803
- Robbins Lane Elementary School
  157 Robbins Lane
  Syosset, NY 11791
- South Grove Elementary School
  60 Colony Lane
  Syosset, NY 11791
- Village Elementary School
  90 Convent Road
  Syosset, NY 11791
- Walt Whitman Elementary School
  482 Woodbury Road
  Woodbury, NY 11797

== Academic Performance ==
The Syosset Central School District is nationally renowned and is consistently ranked among the top performing school districts in the United States. As of the 2026-27 school year, Syosset CSD was ranked the 2nd best school district in New York and the 3rd best school district in the United States by Niche. The school district’s prestige causes homes located within its boundaries to be significantly more expensive than those located just outside it. In this school district, 78% of students are considered proficient in Reading and Writing, and 87% are considered proficient in Mathematics. Additionally, the district has a 99% graduation rate, an average SAT score of 1400 (compared to a national average of 1024) and an average ACT score of 31 (compared to a national average of 19.4).

== Board of education ==
For the 2025-2026 school year, the Board of Education includes:

- Carol C. Cheng, President
- Lisa A. Coscia, Vice President
- Lynn Abramson, Trustee
- Susan Falkove, Trustee
- David Ginsburg, Trustee
- Brian J. Grieco, Trustee
- Anna Levitan, Trustee
- Shany Park, Trustee
- Thomas A. Rotolo, Trustee
- Nikhil Shah, Student Member (Ex-Officio)

== Early Regents Exams ==
In most schools throughout NY state, the NYS Regents Exam for Algebra 1 and Earth Science is administered in 9th grade. However, these tests are administered in 8th grade for students in Syosset and some other districts in NY State. This practice primarily gives pupils the opportunity to take more higher level science and math courses in high school (e.g. AP Calculus BC), while also giving more time to study for the SATs and prepare for college.

== Awards and recognition ==
- 1992-1993: Syosset High School recognized as a U.S. Department of Education Blue Ribbon School of Excellence.
- 1996-1997: Harry B. Thompson Middle School recognized as a Blue Ribbon School of Excellence.
- 1999-2000: South Woods Middle School recognized as a Blue Ribbon School of Excellence.
- 2002: School district named winner of the Kennedy Center Alliance for Arts Education Network and National School Boards Association Award for excellence in arts education.
- 2004: Syosset High School named a Grammy Signature for its music programs in orchestra, band and chorus.
- 2006: Village Elementary School recognized as a No Child Left Behind - Blue Ribbon School by the U.S. Department of Education.
- 2008: New York State History Day Contest winners: Third place, Junior Group Performance; First place, Senior Historical Paper
- 2009: Two semifinalists in the Regeneron Science Talent Search
- 2019: Syosset CSD was ranked 4th in New York by Niche.
- 2025: South Grove Elementary School recognized as a Blue Ribbon School of Excellence.
- 2026: Syosset Central School District was ranked #1 in the United States by Niche.
- 2027: Syosset Central School District was ranked #2 in the United States by Niche.

== General Information ==
6386 students were enrolled in Syosset schools for the 2014-2015 school year. The student body was 48% female and 52% male; as of 2024, it was 46.9% White, 45% Asian and 4.9% Hispanic. The district specializes in the arts with well recognized programs in art, voice, cooking, dance, theatre, band, orchestra, and photography. Syosset schools participate in county and state programs for voice and art.

The Syosset Central School District has an intensive mandatory foreign language program with kindergarten Russian, 1st grade Chinese, grade 2-4 Italian, Spanish, or French, and grade 5 Latin. In middle school (grades 6-8) students choose from Spanish, Italian, French, Chinese or Korean. Syosset has gradually added languages to reflect the cultural backgrounds of students; for example, the large student populations of Italian, Chinese, Korean and Russian Jewish backgrounds can study the languages corresponding with their heritage. In high school (grades 9-12) students stick with their first language (Italian, French, Spanish, Korean, or Chinese) and can take an additional language, including Japanese, Russian, Latin, or American Sign Language.

First Lady Hillary Clinton visited Village Elementary School in 1999.
