= Locust Grove, New York =

- Hamlet and former census-designated place
- Location on Long Island Location within the state of New York
- Coordinates: 40°48′36″N 73°30′7″W
- Country: United States
- State: New York
- County: Nassau
- Town: Oyster Bay

Area
  - Total: 1.07 sq mi (2.8 km^{2})
  - Land: 1.07 sq mi (2.8 km^{2})
  - Water: 0 sq mi (0.0 km^{2})
- Elevation: 200 ft (60 m)
- Time zone: UTC-5 (Eastern (EST))
  - Summer (DST): UTC-4 (EDT)
- ZIP Code: 11791
- Area codes: 516, 363
- GNIS feature ID: 0970312

Locust Grove is a hamlet and former census-designated place (CDP) in the Town of Oyster Bay in Nassau County, on Long Island, in New York, United States. It is located within the CDP of Syosset, which absorbed it for the 1990 United States Census.

== History ==
The name Locust Grove was first used by the United States Census Bureau to define the community for the 1960 United States census.

The Locust Grove CDP was absorbed by the Syosset CDP for the 1990 United States Census.

On October 22, 1990, over 4,000 electrical customers in Locust Grove, Woodbury, and Syosset were left without electricity when an underground power cable in the hamlet was accidentally struck by construction workers. Power was restored later that day.

== Geography ==
According to the United States Geological Survey, Locust Grove is located roughly 197 feet (60 m) above sea level.

Locust Grove has an area of roughly 1.07 square miles (2.8 km^{2}).

== Demographics ==
At the time of the 1960 United States census, the population of Locust Grove was 11,558.

At the time of the 1970 United States census, the population of Locust Grove was 11,626.

At the time of the 1980 United States census, the population of Locust Grove was 9,670.

Additionally, in 1990, the Long Island Lighting Company (LILCO) estimated the total population to be 9,060, as of January 1 of that year.

== See also ==
- Baldwin Harbor, New York
- East Garden City, New York
- Strathmore, New York
