= Port Jefferson Branch =

Long Island Rail Road branch

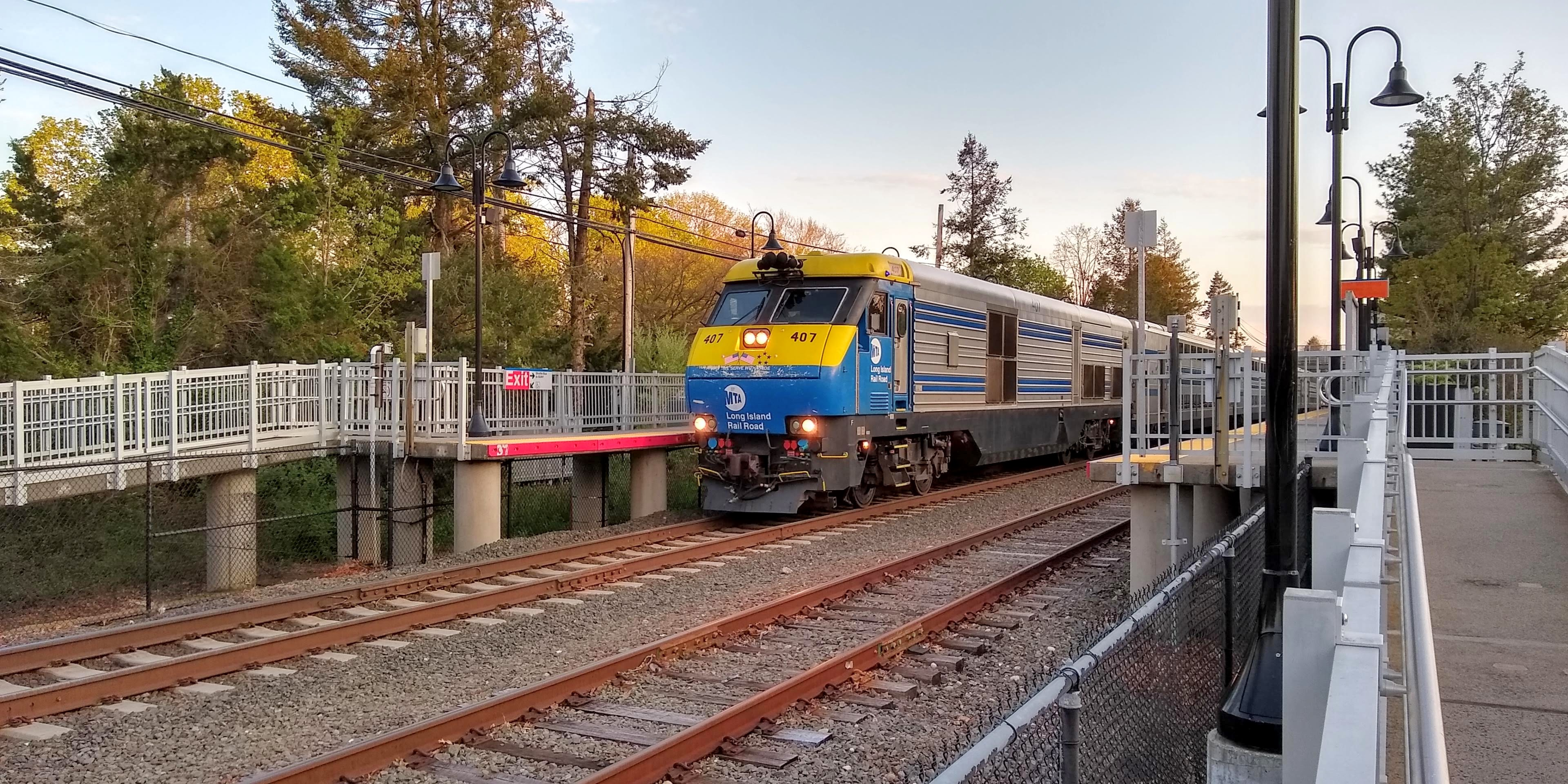
- DE30AC #407 enters Stony Brook station, pulling an eastbound train towards Port Jefferson in 2022

Overview
- Status: Operational
- Owner: Long Island Rail Road
- Locale: Nassau and Suffolk Counties, New York, USA
- Termini: Hicksville; Huntington Port Jefferson
- Stations: 10

Service
- Type: Commuter rail
- System: Long Island Rail Road
- Services: Port Jefferson Branch
- Operator: Metropolitan Transportation Authority
- Ridership: 15,054,124 (annual ridership, 2025)

History
- Opened: 1854–1873

Technical
- Track gauge: 4 ft 8 1/2 in (1,435 mm)
- Electrification: Third rail, 750 V DC (west of Huntington)
Route map
- Distances shown from Long Island City

The Port Jefferson Branch is a rail line and service owned and operated by the Long Island Rail Road in the U.S. state of New York. The branch splits from the Main Line just east of Hicksville and runs northeast and east to Port Jefferson. Several stations on the Main Line west of Hicksville are served primarily by trains bound to/from the Port Jefferson branch, so LIRR maps and schedules for the public include that part of the Main Line in the "Port Jefferson Branch" service.

The Port Jefferson Branch is the busiest branch of the LIRR, with frequent electric service to Huntington where electrification ends, and diesel service east of Huntington continuing to Port Jefferson. The MTA also refers to the line as the "Huntington/Port Jefferson Branch" or "Huntington Branch".

== Service ==
Port Jefferson Branch service (as distinct from the physical trackage called the Port Jefferson Branch) extends east from Floral Park, where the Hempstead Branch separates from the Main Line. The line west of Huntington is electrified and double tracked. Electrification extends east of Huntington, past a layup track used to store electric trains, to a point between the Park Avenue and Lake Road grade crossings. East of there, the line is single-track, with a double-ended freight siding at Greenlawn, an interlocked passing siding east of Northport, and further interlocked sidings at Kings Park, Smithtown and Stony Brook passenger stations, allowing trains traveling in opposite directions to pass each other.

Electric trains on the branch operate between Manhattan (Penn Station or Grand Central) and Huntington, providing local service on the branch. Trains to the Ronkonkoma Branch provide supplemental service; these usually run express, stopping only at Mineola and/or Hicksville. Additional service to Mineola is provided by Oyster Bay Branch trains, and a handful of Montauk Branch trains also stop at Mineola and Hicksville on weekdays, though the vast majority of Montauk Branch trains that run on the Main Line do not stop. Service on the non-electrified portion of the branch between Port Jefferson and Huntington is usually provided by diesel shuttles; transfers generally occur at Huntington between diesel shuttles and electric trains to/from city terminals. During rush hours, the branch sees extra service, including direct service between stations east of Huntington and Hunterspoint Avenue, Long Island City, or Penn Station.

Stations on the electrified portion that have the heaviest traffic include Mineola (Main Line), Hicksville (Main Line), and Huntington. On the non-electrified portion, the heaviest traffic tends to be to the Stony Brook station where Stony Brook University is located.

== History ==
The line from Hicksville to Syosset was chartered in 1853 as the Hicksville and Syosset Railroad and opened in 1854. The LIRR later planned to extend to Cold Spring Harbor, but Oliver Charlick, the LIRR's president, disagreed over the station's location, so Charlick abandoned the grade and relocated the extension south of Cold Spring, refusing to add a station stop near Cold Spring for years. Another argument at Huntington led to the line bypassing the town two miles (3 km) to the south, though a station was built. The line was extended from Syosset past Huntington to Northport in 1868, and in 1873 the 1870-chartered Smithtown and Port Jefferson Railroad opened from a mile south of Northport to Port Jefferson, turning the old line into the Northport Branch, the result of another argument between Charlick and Northport. The extension required the construction of the Kings Park and Smithtown Trestles.

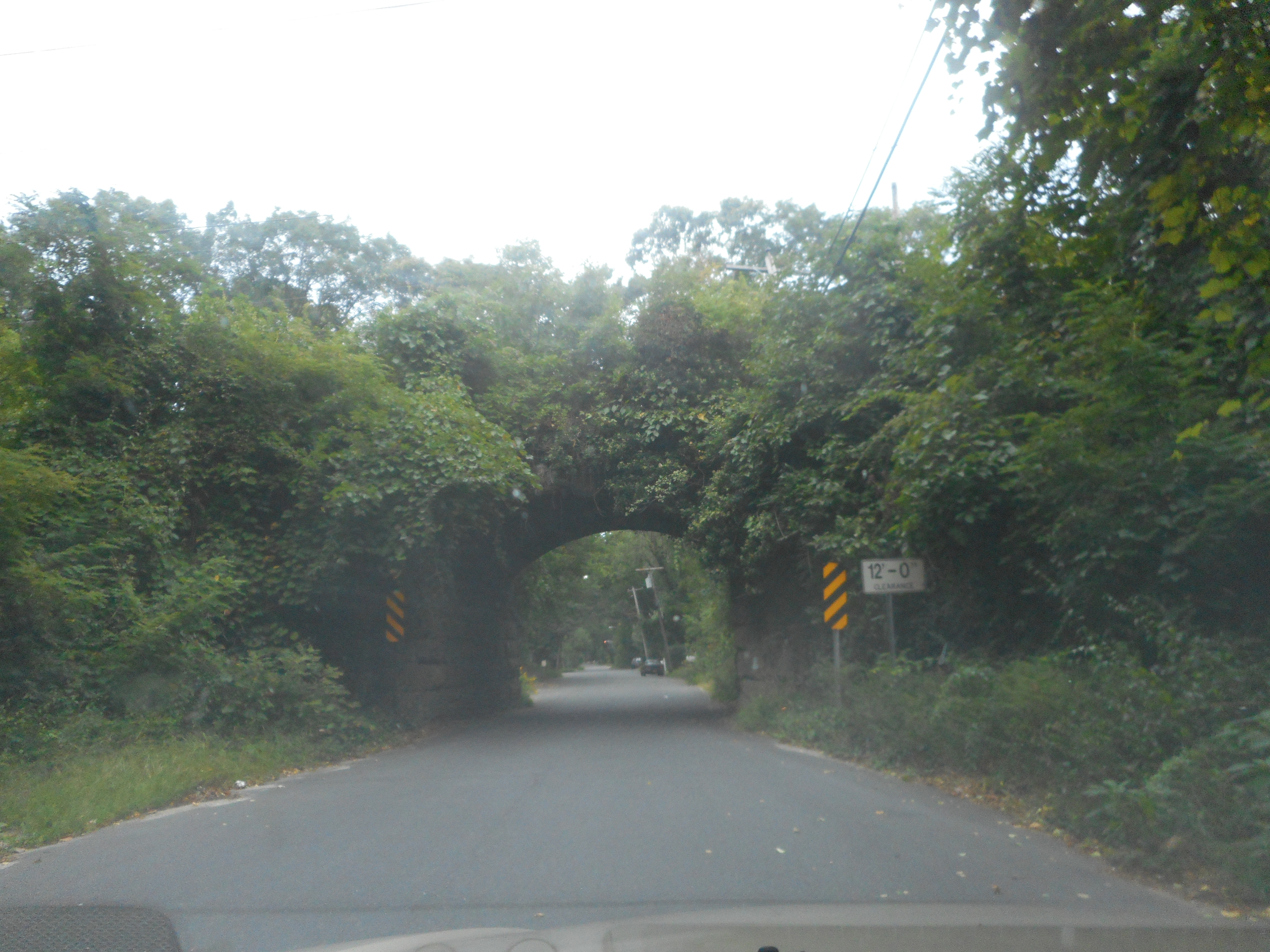
The Woodville Road Bridge in Shoreham which once carried the Wading River Extension of the branch.

The Port Jefferson Branch was extended to Wading River in 1895, and became known as the Wading River Branch. The line was once slated to continue eastward and rejoin the Main Line at either Riverhead or Calverton. From 1905 to 1928, Wading River was also the site of a LIRR demonstration farm. The other one was east of Medford station on the Main Line.

The grade crossing with New York Avenue in Huntington was eliminated in 1909 as that road was lowered below grade. In 1910 and 1911 work was undertaken to reduce grades and eliminate sharp curves along the line between Syosset and Huntington. The project eliminated grade crossings, shortened the line by 3,300 feet (1.0 km), and provided two million yards of excavated material that could be used for the reconstruction of Jamaica station. In 1911, the line's second track was extended from Hicksville to Cold Spring. In 1985, the second track was extended from just east of Syosset to just west of Huntington to alleviate a single-track bottleneck.

The line east of Port Jefferson was abandoned in 1938. The right-of-way is now owned by the Long Island Power Authority and used for power lines. A parallel rail trail for bicycling, running, and walking opened in 2022. The Port Jefferson Branch was electrified from Mineola to Huntington in 1970. The former Northport Branch was abandoned in 1985, and the Kings Park Psychiatric Center spur (see below) was abandoned in 1988.

=== Kings Park Psychiatric Center Spur ===
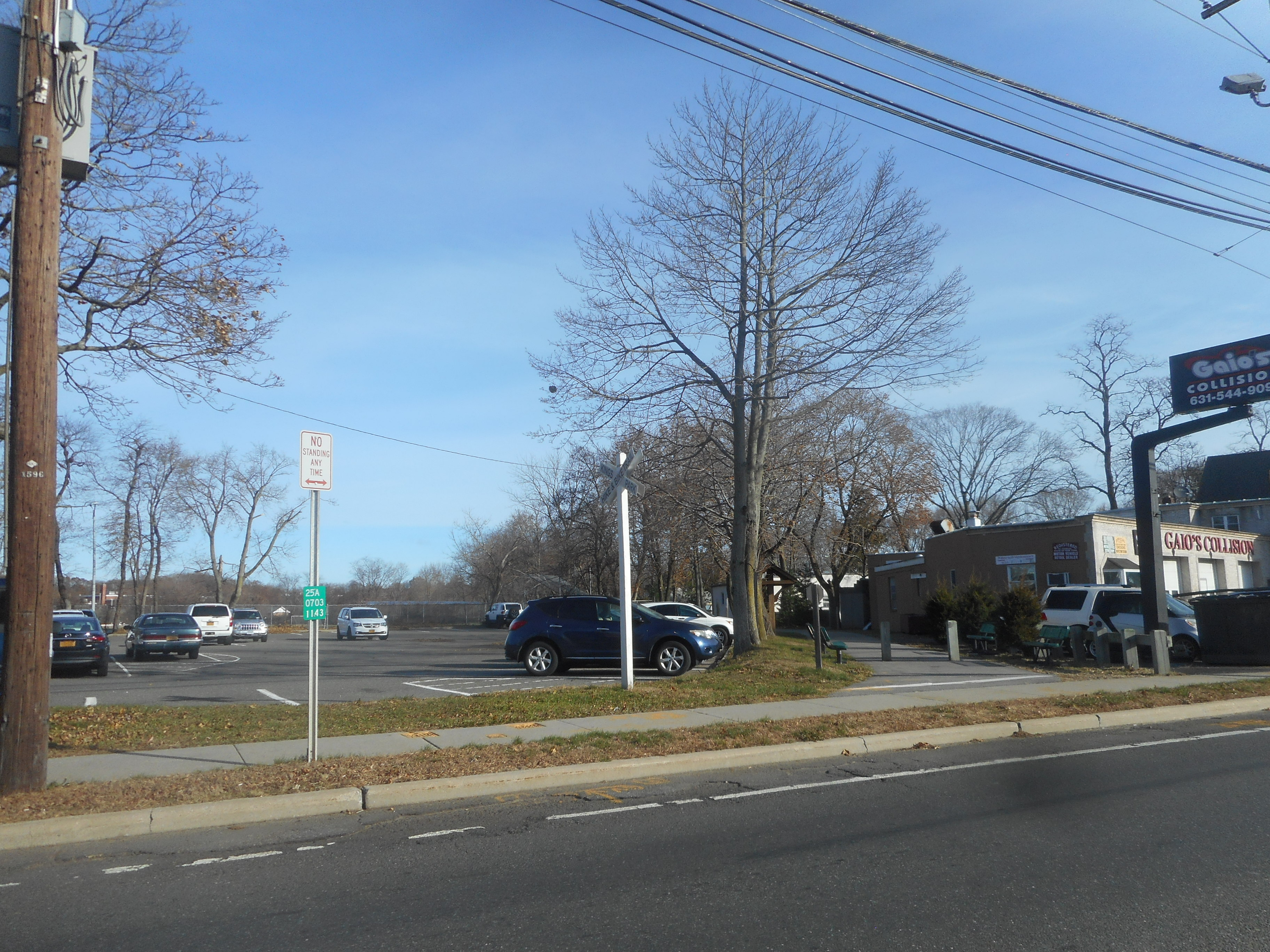
The former crossing of the Kings Park Psychiatric Center spur with NY 25A, now the beginning of the Kings Park Hike and Bike Trail,

The Kings Park Psychiatric run-off (KPPC) is an abandoned spur off the Port Jefferson Branch for the Kings Park Psychiatric Center. This spur started just west of Kings Park station, ran north of the station house, crossed Indian Head Road (Suffolk CR 14) and then curved north to cross New York State Route 25A, where it ran along the western edge of the hospital property, and ended at the Hospital's coal power plant.

This spur was first used in 1896 for coal and passenger use on Sundays. The route was the second-largest spur in the Long Island Rail Road system when it was first completed. The route came to an end during the late 1980s. Nowadays, this abandoned route is a right-of-way for biking and is open to the public today. Only small fragments of rail remain, as it most of it was removed during the demise of the complex.

=== Electrification ===
On October 19, 1970, electrification was extended 16 miles (26 km) from Mineola to Huntington, the eastern limit of electrification on the branch. This was the first major LIRR electrification project since the electrification of the Babylon Branch in 1925 between Lynbrook and Babylon. The project was completed for $69 million, and received funding from a 1967 state transportation bond issue and the United States Department of Transportation. With the completion of electrification to Huntington, six trains would run from electric territory on the branch in the morning, and five would return in the evening, providing direct service to Brooklyn and Penn Station without a change at Jamaica.

Since then, the LIRR has aspired to extend electrification beyond Huntington, however, it has not yet been done so. Due to this, stops Huntington and west see three times as much service than east.

In the 1980s, the railroad prepared to extend electrification to at least Northport, or Smithtown, although electrification of the Ronkonkoma Branch on the Main Line was seen as a higher priority, in part because the Main Line's central location in Suffolk County would benefit a larger number of people.

In December 1983, the LIRR announced that it was taking steps in the electrification of the branch, with the first step being the addition of a second electrified track from Syosset to Huntington. The second built along the south side of the existing track. The second track was expected to be open in 1986. In August 1983, Long Island Lighting Company started relocating its power line along the right-of-way between these points. The following month a contract to prepare the site and to construct the roadbed for the track was awarded for $9.5 million. In December 1983, grading and construction work was expected to begin that month, and track installation was scheduled to be completed by the end of 1985. As part of the project, the 800 feet (240 m) south platform was to be extended to accommodate 12-car trains. The design of the project to Northport was completed, and preliminary designs were expected to be completed by early 1984.

On August 6, 1984, a groundbreaking ceremony was held at Kings Park station for the inauguration of a project to install high-level platforms at that station in preparation of the electrification of the line from Huntington to Smithtown. Kings Park would receive high-level platforms first, with Greenlawn, Northport, and Smithtown also slated to receive them. Work was to be completed in two phases. In the first phase, expected to be completed by the end of 1984, six-car high-level platforms would be installed. These platforms would be extended to accommodate twelve-car trains in the second phase, to be done by the middle of 1985.

Bruce McIver, president of the LIRR at the time, estimated in 1986 that electrification of the branch would cost $320 million, including new rolling stock. He argued that the limited funds the railroad had set aside for electrification would be better spent on other improvements, such as signal and yard upgrades near Penn Station. Financial constraints acted as another obstacle to electrification to Northport. McIver also did not want to electrify the branch in a piecemeal fashion and wanted to wait until the railroad had the funds to electrify from Huntington to Port Jefferson all at once. In anticipation of electrification, from late 1985 to early 1986, the LIRR built full-length high-level platforms at all stations between Huntington and Port Jefferson. Because electrification has not occurred, these 12-car platforms are unique in the LIRR's diesel territory; the high-level platforms along the Montauk, Greenport and Oyster Bay diesel branches are all much shorter. Work to install centralized traffic control between Smithtown and Port Jefferson started in fall 1974 and was completed in March 1975. This project was intended to improve safety and to increase train speed. The change allowed bidirectional service in single-track territory with the use of passing sidings.

On June 9, 1986, double-tracking of the line between Syosset and Huntington was completed, and seven additional trains (two diesels and five electric) were added to the schedule. The second track sped some trips by up to 15 minutes, and increased operational flexibility. The $41 million project started in September 1983 and included the widening of bridges at West Rogues Path and Woodbury Road, five rubberized grade crossings, and the installation of a six-car length platform on the new second track at Cold Spring Harbor. Construction for the project required off-peak service outages starting in June 1985, and its completion was delayed from fall 1985 due to delays in property acquisition in Cold Spring Harbor.

Instead of electrification, the LIRR ultimately pursued dual-mode locomotives that could switch between diesel power and electric power to serve Penn Station (where diesel emissions are banned). Senator Norman Levy said that "The people who ride the line would have just about all the positive aspects of electrification with this proposal." The LIRR's dual-mode locomotives debuted in the late 1990s, providing two round trips during weekday rush hours between Penn Station and Port Jefferson, the first time a one-seat ride was available.

==== Proposed electrification extension ====
In 2015, multiple parties renewed calls for electrification of the branch. The LIRR estimated that electrification would cost up to $18 million per track mile, so electrification of the 23 miles from Huntington to Port Jefferson could cost approximately $414 million. In its 20-Year Needs Assessment, the agency lists electrification eastward as a long-term goal.

In September 2018, LIRR President Phillip Eng said the LIRR is still exploring the possibility of electrifying the remaining section of track between Huntington and Port Jefferson.

=== Grade crossing eliminations ===
The Port Jefferson Branch and Main Line have been known to have some of the most hazardous grade crossings in the country. On April 28, 1998, a bridge over Herricks Road opened, replacing a grade crossing which was once "labeled the most hazardous in the United States by the National Transportation Safety Board." The grade-crossing elimination project was initiated after an incident on March 14, 1982, when a van with ten teenagers got struck at the four-lane wide rail crossing with the crossing gates down, killing nine of them. The project took five years and cost $85 million. Work continued for a year to widen the overpass to allow for a future third track.

Other crossings eliminated along the branch include Mineola Boulevard in Mineola (1930), crossings within Hicksville when the station was elevated in the early 1960s, and Charlotte Avenue in Hicksville (1973). Ten years later in 2008, the four-lane wide Roslyn Road in Mineola was eliminated in the same fashion. Several hazardous crossings still exist west of Huntington east of DIVIDE interlocking, such as Robbins Lane and Jackson Avenue in Syosset. East of Huntington, Park Avenue in Huntington and Main Street in Port Jefferson are considered quite hazardous.

The Third Track project closed the seven remaining grade crossings on the Main Line, namely those in Westbury, Mineola, and New Hyde Park. The first two crossings that underwent elimination would be Urban Avenue in Westbury and Covert Avenue in New Hyde Park. Construction to eliminate began from February–April 2019 with the closures of both roads. On the weekend of July 20–21, 2019, the trestle carrying the three tracks was installed at Urban Avenue. After construction of retaining walls, pedestrian walkway, and the repaving of the road, Urban Avenue was officially reopened on September 5, 2019. Covert Avenue underwent the installation of a three-track trestle on the weekend of August 24–25 and reopened on October 12, 2019. New Hyde Park underwent the installation of a three-track trestle on the weekend of July 11–12, 2020, and reopened in August 2020.

By mid-2021, Main Street in Mineola, the pedestrian crossing at Mineola's station, and 12th Street in New Hyde Park were permanently closed to pedestrian and vehicular traffic, while Willis Avenue in Mineola and School Street in Westbury received trestles, with the roads crossing underneath. From May 2020 to November 2020, School Street underwent a grade crossing elimination and reopened less than two years after a violent accident occurred involving a pick-up truck and two trains. On October 24, 2020, the stretch of the line in New Hyde Park was officially grade-separated following the permanent closure of the 12th Street crossing. By late 2020, the only remaining grade crossings on the Main Line between Hicksville and Floral Park were located in Mineola. In November 2020, Willis Avenue's elimination project began that saw its Main Line and Oyster Bay Branch crossings eliminated with the road going underneath the tracks. Main Street and the pedestrian crossing were removed shortly thereafter.

After the Third Track Project was completed, all Main Line grade crossings from Hicksville westward were eliminated, noise from horns was reduced to the benefit of residents along the tracks, and carbon emissions from idling vehicles was eliminated. The elimination and reopening of Willis Avenue on September 3, 2021, officially marked the completion of the grade crossing elimination aspect of the Third Track Project, and the branch being fully grade-separated west of Hicksville.

== Infrastructure improvements ==
=== New electric yard ===
Lacking a yard to store its electric trains, the branch has storage space for just three 12-car electric trainsets (at the South Side track extension east of Huntington). As a result, electric trains must deadhead to Huntington for rush hour service from as far away as West Side Yard in Manhattan, about 37 miles (60 km) away. A new yard for electric trains would resolve this inefficiency and allow more frequent service on the branch.

In the early 2000s, the MTA performed environmental studies for over a dozen potential sites for a yard between Huntington and Smithtown. Sites beyond Huntington would require extending the electrical infrastructure, which adds expense.

Communities near the sites opposed the MTA's efforts to advance work on a new yard, arguing that the MTA was too secretive and that the increased train service and train movements would hurt their communities and decrease their quality of life. One commenter asserted that a yard would turn the communities along the line into the MTA's "storage closet" for East Side Access. Other opponents of the plan argued that the MTA should extend electrification to Port Jefferson and use its existing diesel rail yard.

The MTA budgeted $8 million in its 2015–2019 Capital Program for environmental studies, design work, and land acquisition for a new electric yard. (Construction would be funded in a future Capital Program.) As of 2019, the MTA was also considering other options, including extending electrification and/or a second track from Huntington to Port Jefferson.

In February 2022, local leaders urged the MTA to consider a Superfund site near the Port Jefferson Station—the former Lawrence Aviation Industries site—for the electric storage yard, as well as extending electrification from Huntington to Port Jefferson. The MTA has not moved forward with this plan or any others. The MTA ended its bid to buy the Lawrence Aviation site in June 2026, but in a surprise move acquired the property in late September 2026.

=== Third track between Floral Park and Hicksville ===
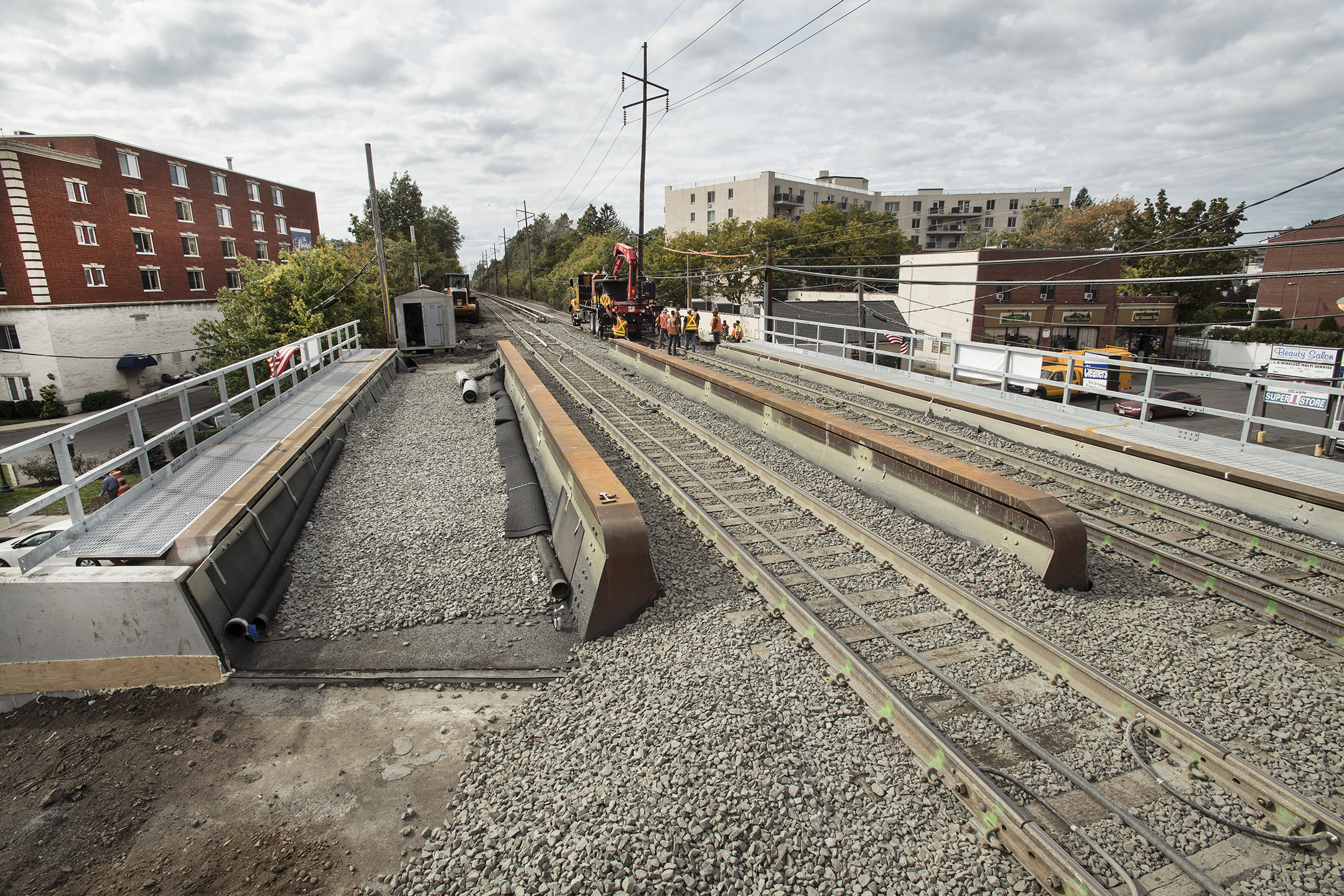
The Post Avenue Bridge near Westbury station, which was replaced in October 2017 to accommodate a third track

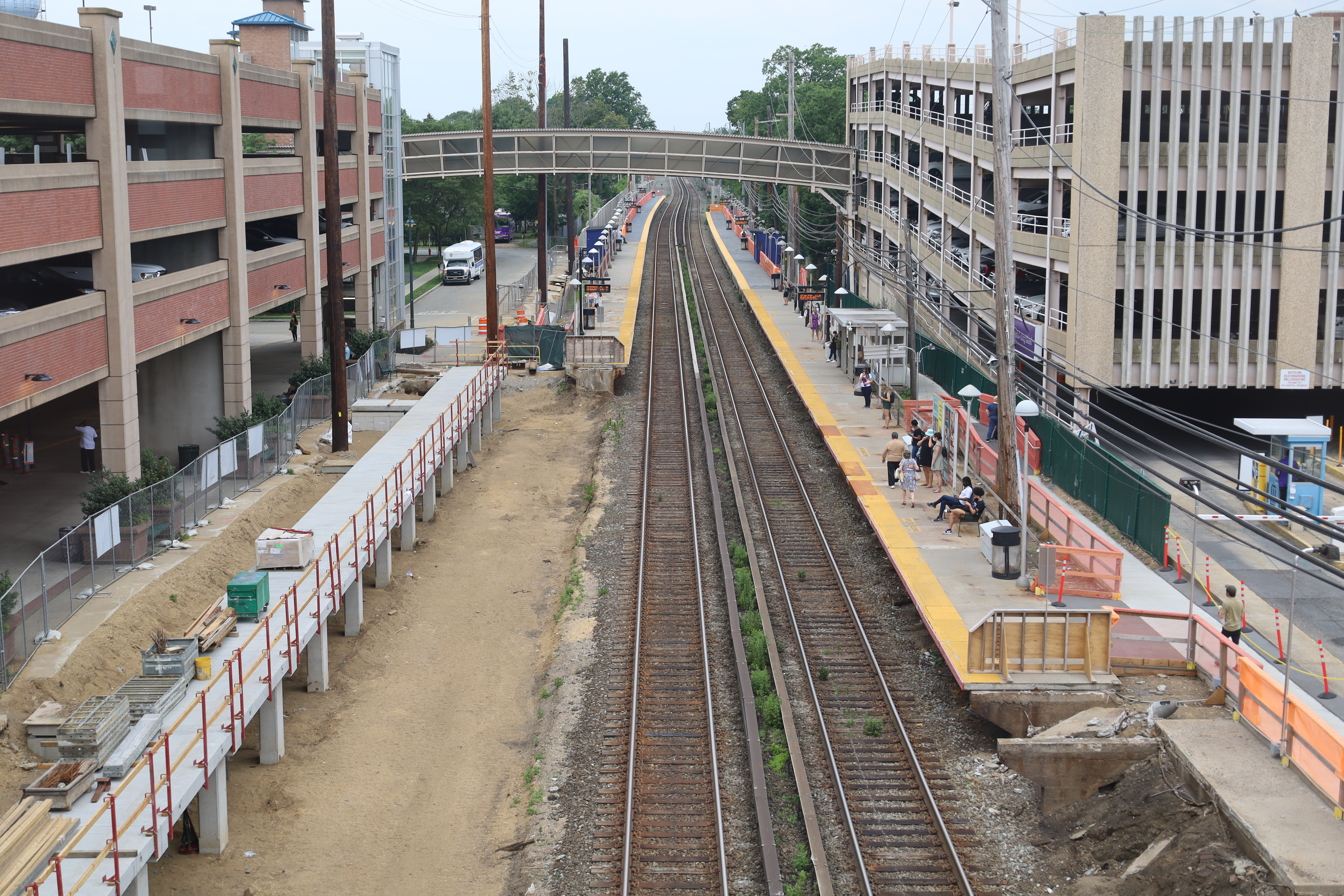
Construction of new platforms at the Mineola station in 2021 to accommodate the third track

To accommodate a projected increase in Long Island Rail Road ridership following completion of the East Side Access project to Grand Central Terminal, and to expand local and reverse-peak service, a third track was built on the Main Line between Floral Park and Hicksville. The construction project, also known as the LIRR Expansion Project, included purchasing properties in the track's right of way, eliminating grade crossings (in conjunction with New York State Department of Transportation), relocating existing stations, and reconfiguring Mineola Station. The project was stalled by fierce opposition from the villages of Floral Park, New Hyde Park, and Garden City, which advocated that construction and the resulting increased train service will reduce the quality of life in their neighborhoods. These villages did, however, support the station improvements and the elimination of grade crossings that the LIRR has planned in conjunction with the third track, and called for the LIRR to complete them in lieu of third track expansion, but the MTA has long insisted that a third track is a necessary component of LIRR's East Side Access expansion. In March 2015, LIRR president Patrick Nowakowski declared that the LIRR would not proceed with the project without the support of the local communities.

Small segments of the third track already existed: one segment between Merillon Avenue and Mineola, built in the vicinity of Herricks Road during the grade crossing elimination project that took place in 1998, and another was built during a 2014–2018 renovation project at Hicksville station, which connected Track 1 at Hicksville station to the North Siding track located about 3,000 feet (910 m) west of the station. This short segment would eventually become the eastern end of the Third Track, and already allowed for a slight increase in peak-hour service upon its completion. The MTA had also left provisions for a third track in construction of other infrastructure along the line, such as the Mineola Intermodal Center located adjacent to Mineola station, Mineola Boulevard Bridge, Roslyn Road Underpass in Mineola, and the replacement Ellison Avenue Bridge over the Main Line in Westbury.

In January 2016, Governor Andrew Cuomo announced a transportation improvement plan which included several million dollars in funding to restart third track development. Governor Cuomo said that unlike previous third track proposals, his plan would involve building the third track within existing LIRR right of way, which would reduce the number of existing homes and businesses affected by installation of the third track. While previous proposals would have affected around 250 properties, 80 of which were homes, Governor Cuomo's proposal would only require taking small amounts of property from 50 properties in total, including around 20 homes. This reduction in properties affected was accomplished by shifting the alignments of tracks in some areas to make room for the third track within the right-of-way and building a shorter third track than previous proposals, resulting in a 9.8-mile (15.8 km) three-track segment starting at Floral Park (the easternmost station shared by the Hempstead Branch and Main Line, where the Hempstead Branch and Main Line split from a 4-track corridor into two distinct pairs of tracks), instead of the previously planned 11.5-mile (18.5 km) segment starting from Queens Village. Despite the promise of mitigation efforts, several local politicians denounced the governor's plan within a day of its announcement; Floral Park's mayor told The New York Times that "we thought this was dead and buried", while New Hyde Park's mayor pledged to "fight the governor vehemently on this" and a local state senator called the governor's plan "dead on arrival."

In December 2017, the LIRR awarded a contract for the project to the consortium 3rd Track Constructors for $1.8 billion, with construction beginning in 2018 and completion estimated for 2022. The first part of the contract included the reconstruction of the Carle Place, Mineola, and Floral Park stations; the construction or reconstruction of six railroad crossings and underpasses; and the construction of a parking structure at Mineola station. A groundbreaking ceremony for the Third Track project was held on September 5, 2018. All eight grade crossings in the Third Track construction area were removed by February 2021. The first phase of the third track opened on August 15, 2022, and a second phase opened on August 30. The entirety of the third track was complete by October 3, 2022.

== Stations ==
West of New Hyde Park, trips go on to terminate at Penn Station, Hunterspoint Avenue, Grand Central, or Jamaica. Stations east of Port Jefferson on the former Wading River Branch were abandoned on October 3, 1938.

Zone	Location	Station	Miles (km) from Long Island City	Date opened	Date closed	Connections / notes
4	New Hyde Park	New Hyde Park	16.2 (26.1)	c. 1837		Nassau Inter-County Express: n24, n25 Originally named Hyde Park
4	Garden City Park	Merillon Avenue	17.3 (27.8)	1837		Originally named Clowesville, then Garden City
4	Mineola	Mineola	18.6 (29.9)	1837		Long Island Rail Road: ■ Ronkonkoma Branch, ■ Montauk Branch, ■ Oyster Bay Branch; Nassau Inter-County Express: n15, n22, n22X, n23, n24, n40, n40X; Originally named Hempstead, then Branch or Hempstead Branch
7	Carle Place	Carle Place	20.4 (32.8)	1842		Nassau Inter-County Express: n22 Originally named Carll Place
7	Westbury	Westbury	21.4 (34.4)	1837		Nassau Inter-County Express: n22, n35
7	New Cassel	New Cassel		1875	1876	
7	Hicksville	Hicksville	24.8 (39.9)	1837		Long Island Rail Road: ■ Ronkonkoma Branch, ■ Montauk Branch; Nassau Inter-County Express: n20H, n22, n24, n48, n49, n78, n79, n80 Suffolk County Transit: Long Island Express
7	Syosset					
7	Syosset	Landia		1952	October 3, 1973	
7	Syosset	Syosset	29.1 (46.8)	1854		
7	Syosset	Woodbury		1875	c. 1901	Replaced by Cold Spring Harbor
9	West Hills	Cold Spring Harbor	31.9 (51.3)	c. 1901		
9	Huntington Station	Huntington	34.7 (55.8)	1868		Suffolk County Transit: 1 Huntington Area Rapid Transit: H10, H20; Terminus of electrification
9	Greenlawn	Greenlawn	37.4 (60.2)	c. 1868		Huntington Area Rapid Transit: H30; Originally named Centreport
9	East Northport	Northport	39.6 (63.7)	1873		Suffolk County Transit: 7 Huntington Area Rapid Transit: H40; Originally named New Northport, then Northport East
10	Kings Park	Kings Park	43.4 (69.8)	1872		Suffolk County Transit: Kings Park On-Demand Zone; Originally named St. Johnsland
10	Smithtown	Smithtown	47.1 (75.8)	1873		Suffolk County Transit: 5, Kings Park On-Demand Zone
10	St. James	St. James	49.9 (80.3)	1873		
10	St. James	Flowerfield		1910	1958	
10	Stony Brook	Stony Brook	53.1 (85.5)	1873		Suffolk County Transit: 51; SBU Transit: Outer Loop, Railroad Routes 1, Railroad Route 2
10	East Setauket	Setauket		1873	June 27, 1980	
10	Port Jefferson Station	Port Jefferson	57.5 (92.5)	January 13, 1873		Suffolk County Transit: 51, 53, 55, 62; Port Jefferson Jitney
	Miller Place	Miller Place	60.5 (97.4)	1898	1938	
	Rocky Point	Rocky Point	64.4 (103.6)	June 27, 1895	1938	Freight house still exists as a lumber yard
	Shoreham	Shoreham	65.7 (105.6)	1900	1938	
	Wading River	Wading River	68.7 (110.6)	June 27, 1895	1938	

== Bibliography ==
- Allen, W.F. (1895). Travelers' Official Railway Guide for the United States, Canada and Mexico Containing Railway Time Schedules, Connections and Distances. New York, New York: The National Railway Publication Company.
