= Woodbury, Nassau County, New York =

- Hamlet and census-designated place
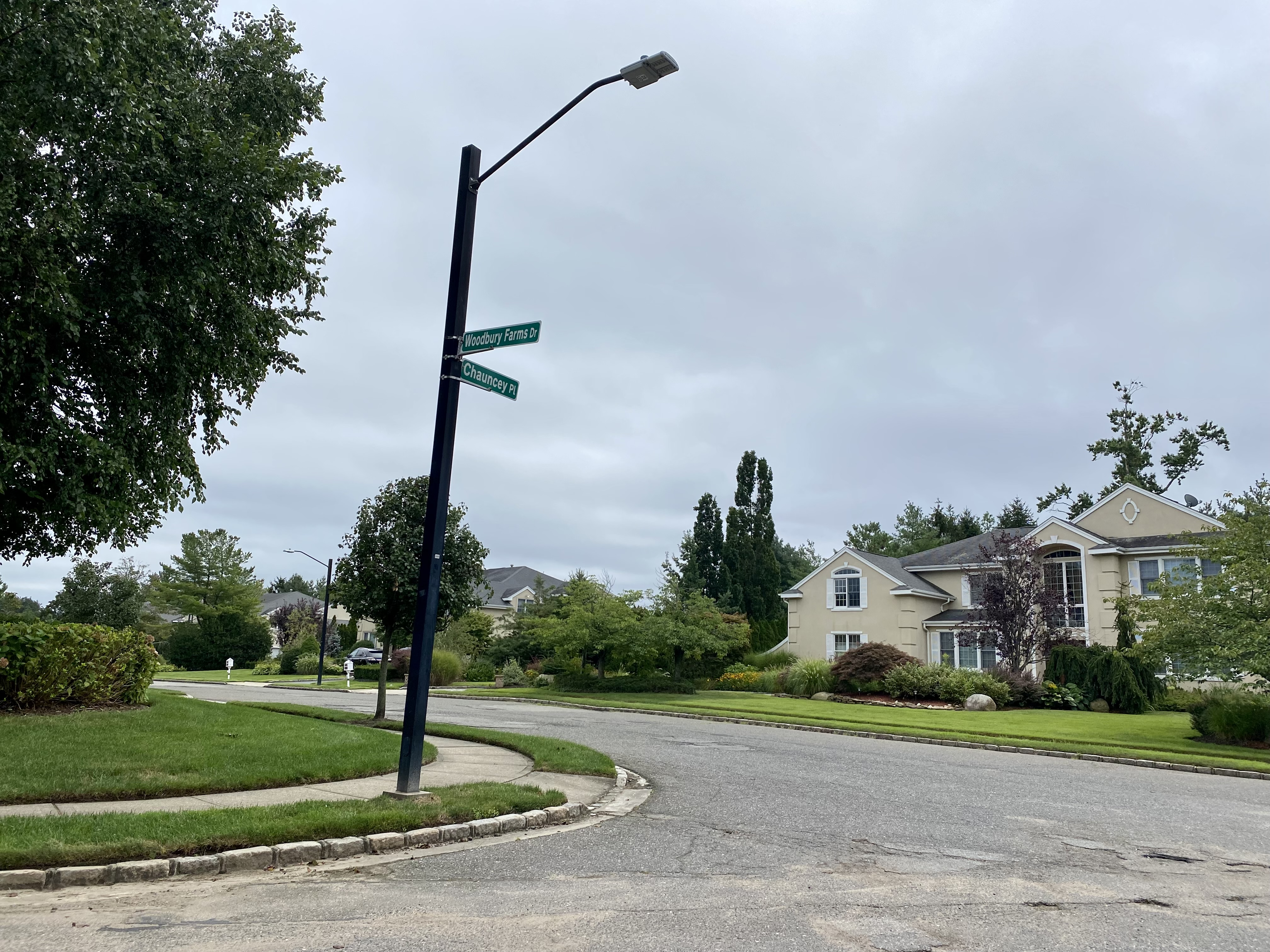
- The corner of Chauncey Place and Woodbury Farms Drive in Woodbury in 2021

- Location in Nassau County and the state of New York

- Location on Long Island Location within the state of New York
- Coordinates: 40°48′50″N 73°28′9″W
- Country: United States
- State: New York
- County: Nassau
- Town: Oyster Bay

Area
  - Total: 5.0 sq mi (13 km^{2})
  - Land: 5.0 sq mi (13 km^{2})
  - Water: 0.0 sq mi (0 km^{2})

Population (2020)
  - Total: 9,335
  - Density: 1,900/sq mi (720/km^{2})
- Time zone: UTC-5 (Eastern (EST))
  - Summer (DST): UTC-4 (EDT)
- ZIP Code: 11797
- Area codes: 516, 363

Woodbury is a hamlet and census-designated place (CDP) located within the Town of Oyster Bay in Nassau County, on Long Island, in New York, United States. Located approximately 35 miles (57 km) east of Midtown Manhattan, Woodbury is considered part of the Greater Syosset area, which is anchored by Syosset. The population was 9,335 at the time of the 2020 census.

== History ==
The location of what is now Woodbury was originally inhabited by Matinecock Native Americans. In the 17th century, European colonists – primarily the Dutch and English – began to settle the area.

The Long Island Rail Road reached the community in 1868, when what is now the Port Jefferson Branch was extended from adjacent Syosset east to Northport in Suffolk County. In 1875, the Woodbury station opened along the Port Jefferson Branch, within the hamlet; it closed at some point between 1901 and 1902, when it was replaced by the current Cold Spring Harbor station just east of Woodbury and the border between Nassau and Suffolk counties.

== Geography ==
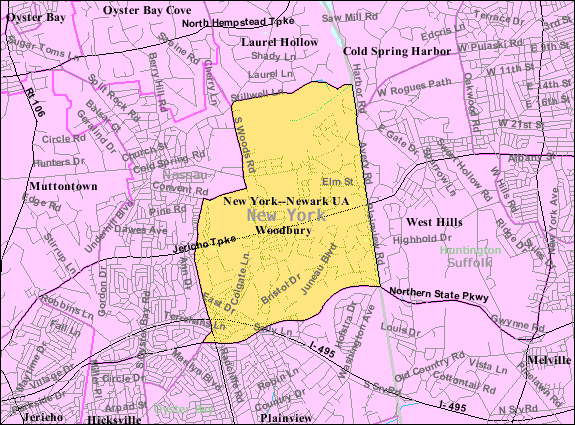
U.S. Census map of Woodbury

According to the United States Census Bureau, the CDP has a total area of 5.0 square miles (13 km^{2}), of which 0.32% is water.

The ZIP Code of the Woodbury Post Office is 11797.

Woodbury borders Laurel Hollow to the north, Plainview to the south, Syosset to the west, and Cold Spring Harbor, West Hills and South Huntington to the east.

== Demographics ==
=== 2020 census ===
As of the census of 2020, there were 9,335 people, 3,155 households, and 2,400 families residing in the CDP. The population density was 1,864.0 inhabitants per square mile (719.7/km^{2}). There were 3,402 housing units at an average density of 679.0 per square mile (262.2/km^{2}). The racial makeup of the CDP was 73.85% White, 1.46% African American, 0.05% Native American, 17.05% Asian, 0.00% Pacific Islander, 1.97% from other races, and 5.62% from two or more races. Hispanic or Latino of any race were 5.62% of the population.

=== Census 2000 ===
As of the census of 2000, there were 9,010 people, 2,851 households, and 2,297 families residing in the CDP. The population density was 1,781.9 inhabitants per square mile (688.0/km^{2}). There were 2,895 housing units at an average density of 572.5 per square mile (221.0/km^{2}). The racial makeup of the CDP was 90.87% White, 0.98% African American, 0.06% Native American, 7.06% Asian, 0.01% Pacific Islander, 0.28% from other races, and 0.75% from two or more races. Hispanic or Latino of any race were 1.42% of the population.

There were 2,851 households, out of which 39.2% had children under the age of 18 living with them, 72.6% were married couples living together, 6.5% had a female householder with no husband present, and 19.4% were non-families. 16.9% of all households were made up of individuals, and 7.0% had someone living alone who was 65 years of age or older. The average household size was 2.82 and the average family size was 3.18.

In the CDP, the population was spread out, with 24.7% under the age of 18, 4.2% from 18 to 24, 23.4% from 25 to 44, 26.7% from 45 to 64, and 21.0% who were 65 years of age or older. The median age was 44 years. For every 100 females, there were 87.9 males. For every 100 females age 18 and over, there were 80.0 males.

The median income for a household in the CDP was $122,643, and the median income for a family was $139,409. Males had a median income of $100,000 versus $51,506 for females. The per capita income for the CDP was $58,316. About 2.6% of families and 3.3% of the population were below the poverty line, including 3.0% of those under age 18 and 7.1% of those age 65 or over. Per City-data.com, the average adjusted gross income (AGI) in 2012 was $234,485 for a household on Woodbury, Long Island. The most updated AGI from 2020 was $303,647 for the average household in Woodbury per city-data.com.

== Education ==
=== Schools ===
Woodbury is located almost entirely within the boundaries of the Syosset Central School District, with the sole exception being a small, uninhabited area – occupied entirely by the Northern State Parkway and its right-of-way – at the southern end of the CDP located within the Plainview-Old Bethpage Central School District. Accordingly, all children who reside within Woodbury and attend public schools attend Syosset's schools.

=== Library districts ===
Woodbury is primarily located within the boundaries of the Syosset Library District (served by the Syosset Public Library in Syosset), with a small, uninhabited section of the Northern State Parkway at the southern end of the CDP being within the Plainview–Old Bethpage Library District (served by the Plainview–Old Bethpage Public Library in Plainview). The library district boundaries in Woodbury correspond with those of the school districts, and all residential properties in the hamlet are thus within the Syosset Library District

== Notable people ==
- Peter David, comics writer, novelist, and screenwriter, known as the co-creator of Miguel O'Hara/Spider-Man 2099, and for his influential 12-year run on The Incredible Hulk.
- Ed Newman (born 1951) – National Football League All-Pro football player.
- Tracy Pollan – Actress and wife of actor Michael J. Fox; raised in Woodbury.
- Joshua Lafazan – Politician.
- Jon Lovett (born August 17, 1982) – American screenwriter, television producer, podcaster, and speechwriter for President Barack Obama and Hillary Clinton.
- Adam Pascal – Actor; grew up in Woodbury.

== See also ==
- Woodbury, Orange County, New York
- Syosset, New York
