= Huntington station (LIRR) =

Long Island Rail Road station in Suffolk County, New York

Huntington
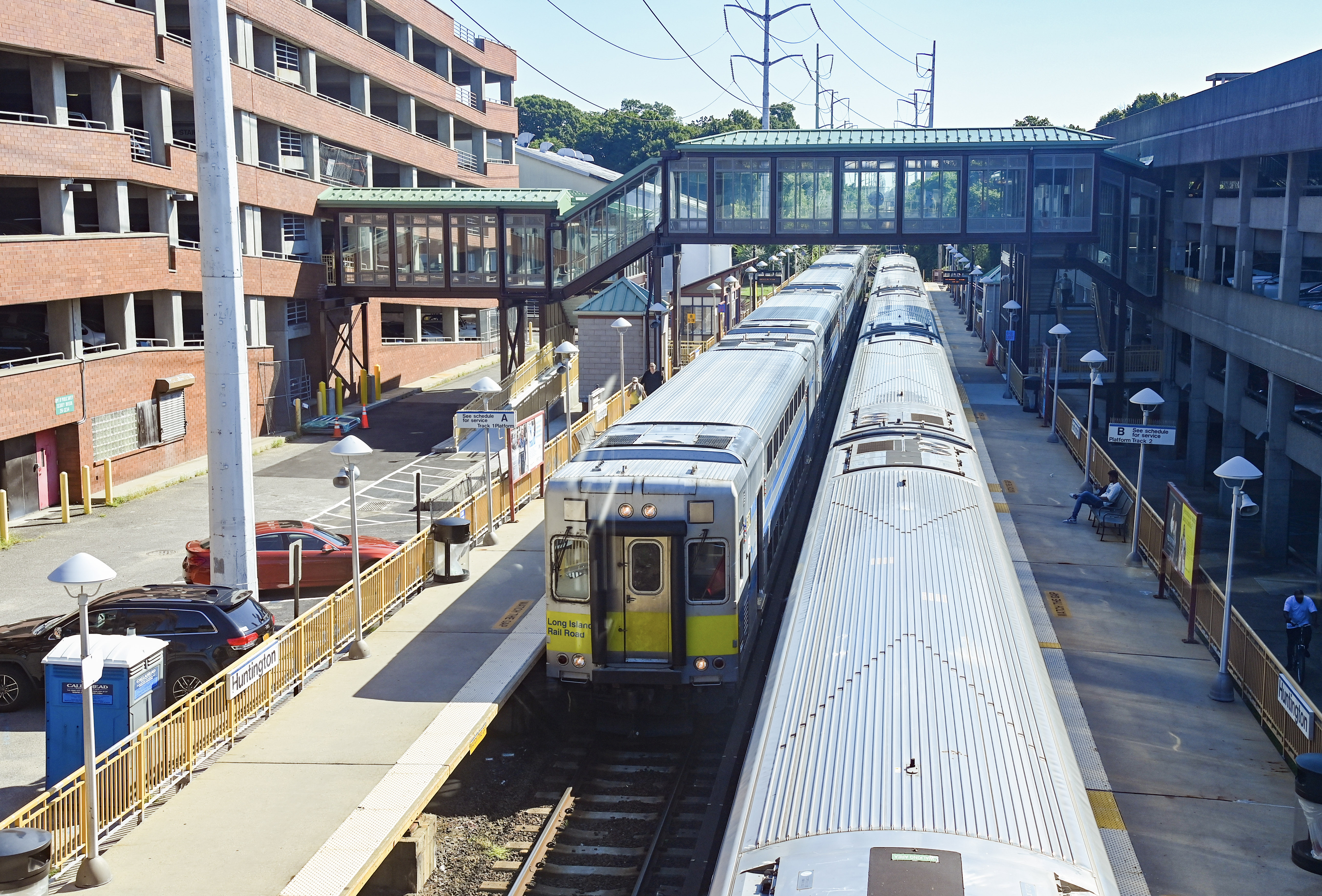
- Huntington station, as seen in 2022

General information
- Location: New York Avenue and Broadway; Huntington Station, New York
- Coordinates: 40°51′9.69″N 73°24′38.30″W
- Owner: Long Island Rail Road
- Platforms: 2 side platforms
- Tracks: 2
- Connections: Suffolk County Transit: 1 Huntington Area Rapid Transit: H20, H10 (limited service)

Construction
- Parking: Yes; 5,040 spaces
- Cycle facilities: Yes
- Accessible: Yes

Other information
- Station code: HUN
- Fare zone: 9

History
- Opened: January 13, 1868
- Rebuilt: 1909, 1980s
- Electrified: October 19, 1970; 750 V (DC) third rail

Passengers
- 2012—2014: 13,970 per weekday

Services
Preceding station	Long Island Rail Road	Following station
Cold Spring Harbor toward Penn Station or Grand Central	Port Jefferson Branch electric service	Terminus
Cold Spring Harbor toward Penn Station or Long Island City	Port Jefferson Branch diesel service	Greenlawn toward Port Jefferson
Former services
Preceding station	Long Island Rail Road	Following station
Cold Spring Harbor toward Hicksville	Wading River Branch	Greenlawn toward Wading River
Location

Huntington is a major station and transportation hub along the Port Jefferson Branch of the Long Island Rail Road in Huntington Station, in Suffolk County, New York, United States. It is located off New York Avenue (NY 110), which connects it to Melville, the Long Island Expressway, and Huntington.

The Huntington station serves as the eastern terminus of electric service on the Port Jefferson Branch, with the remainder of the line east to Port Jefferson being served by diesel locomotives.

== History ==
=== Early history ===
Huntington station opened on January 13, 1868, amidst a great deal of controversy between the people of Huntington and Oliver Charlick over the right-of-way and station location, which the people wanted directly within Huntington Village – specifically at Main Street and New York Avenue. Instead, the station is located approximately 1.5 miles (2.4 km) south of the village in a hamlet originally known as "Fairground," due to a disagreement between Charlick and the Joneses – an affluent family that resided in the area.

Throughout much of the 20th century, the station served as a hub. One reason for this was that it also served as the southern terminus of the Huntington Trolley Spur between 1890 and 1909. The trolley was electrified on June 17, 1898, and extended towards Melville, Farmingdale, and Amityville in 1909. The trolley ran between Halesite and Amityville until 1919, and was replaced in 1920 by another trolley which only ran as far south as Jericho Turnpike until 1927.

The grade crossing at New York Avenue was eliminated between 1908 and 1909. This grade crossing elimination project also required the relocation of the original station building, which was located south of the present structure. The current station building was built in 1909 and was renovated by the Long Island Rail Road for its centennial.

=== Electric service era, 1970–present ===
On October 19, 1970, a project to electrify the Port Jefferson Branch up to Huntington was completed, following the completion of a project to install high-level platforms at the station. The station also became a transfer point for diesel trains serving the non-electrified portion of the branch, requiring most passengers traveling to and from points east to change at Huntington.

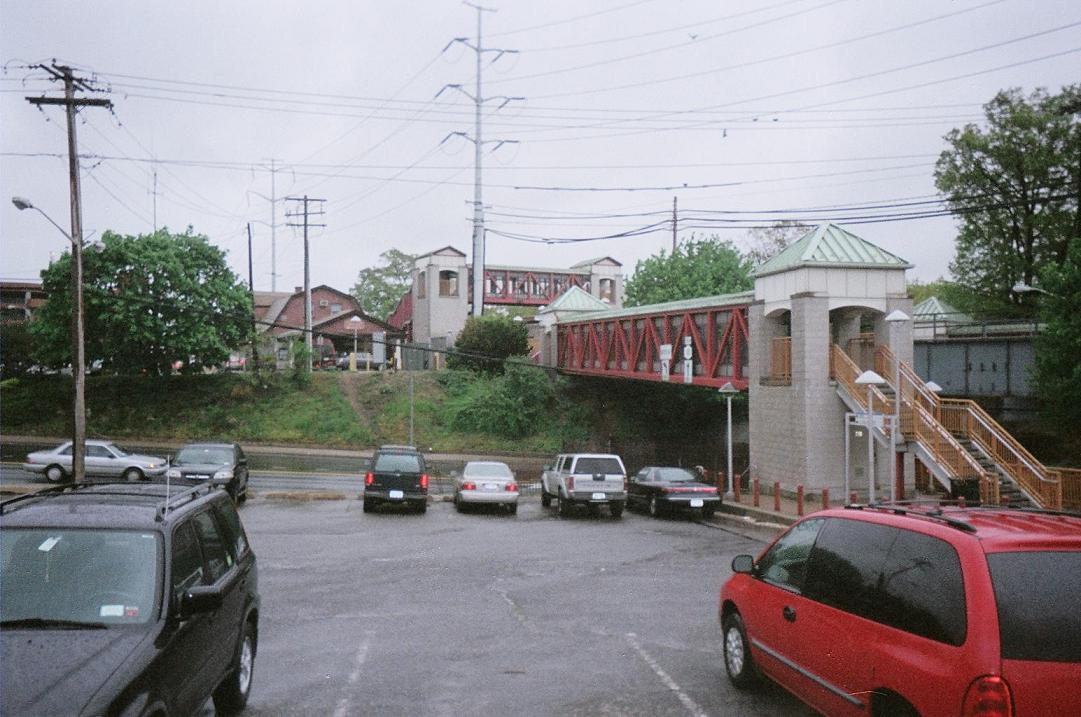
Two of the station's pedestrian bridges – among the many 1980s improvements made

The first parking garage was constructed on the south side of the station in the 1980s. The following decade, the station received a major reconstruction that included the addition of handicap-accessible ramps, a second parking garage on the north side of the station, a second pedestrian bridge across both tracks, and a pedestrian bridge across New York Avenue.

=== Transit-oriented development ===
As one of the busiest stations on the LIRR network, the area surrounding the Huntington station has been a prime target for transit-oriented development. Avalon Huntington Station, which occupies a nearby lot southeast of the station and contains several hundred residential units in a walkable, mixed-use development, was opened in 2014.

== Station layout ==
The station has two high-level side platforms, each 12 cars long.

Both through trains and terminating trains use either platform, with designations noted in the branch timetable. Transfers between diesel and electric trains are typically made on the same platform, with a five-to-ten minute buffer in between the arrival of an electric train and the departure of a diesel train (or vice versa).

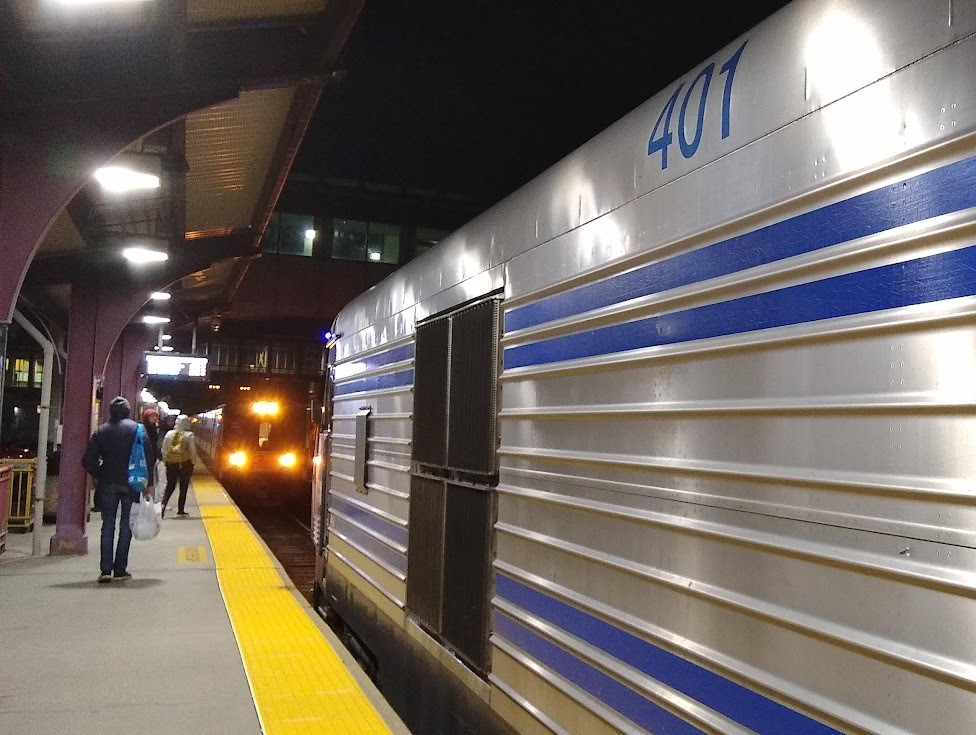
Same-platform transfer between trains at Huntington

=== Storage siding ===
East of the station storage siding long enough to accommodate 24 railcars. Electrification ends about 600 feet (180 m) west of Lake Road, so all electric trains that terminate here are stored on the siding.

Previously, the LIRR had plans to build an electric equipment maintenance facility in the vicinity of this siding, but the project was canceled due to community opposition.

== Station artwork ==
The station boasts a series of 19 stained glass panels that can be viewed from the platform. They were created as part of the Metropolitan Transportation Authority's Arts for Transit program by East Hampton artist Joe Zucker. The panels are called For My Grandfather Noye Pride, a Locomotive Engineer, and make up a 115-foot depiction of a flatbed train carrying items familiar to Long Island including lobsters, whales, ducks and boats. The panels were created using 8,000 pieces of glass.

== See also ==
- List of Long Island Rail Road stations
- Babylon station
- Ronkonkoma station
