= Syosset, New York =

- Hamlet and census-designated place
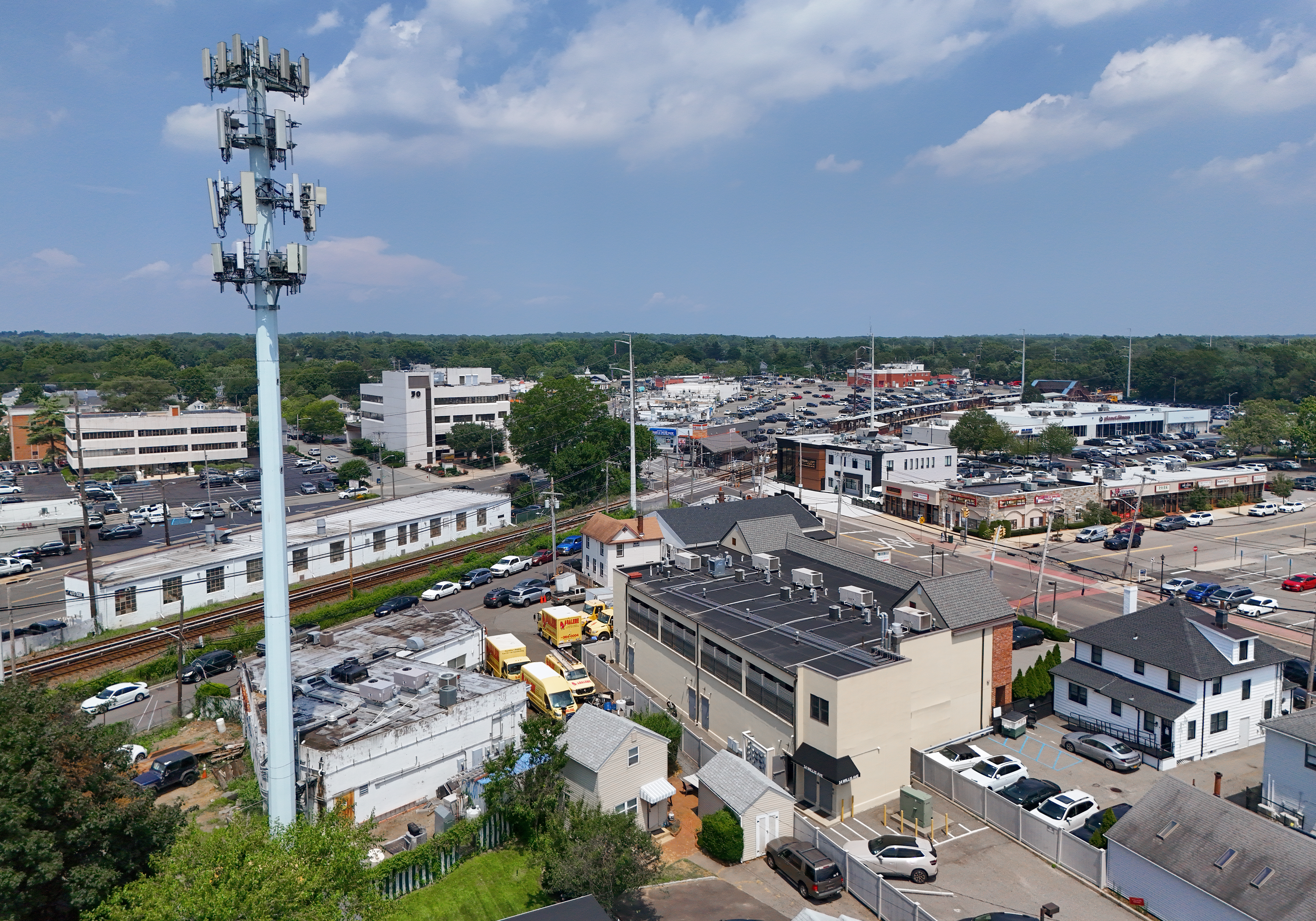
- Downtown Syosset in 2025
- Motto: "Together We Will Make a Difference"
- Location in Nassau County and the state of New York

- Location on Long Island Location within the state of New York
- Coordinates: 40°48′46″N 73°30′3″W
- Country: United States
- State: New York
- County: Nassau
- Town: Oyster Bay

Area
  - Total: 4.98 sq mi (12.89 km^{2})
  - Land: 4.98 sq mi (12.89 km^{2})
  - Water: 0 sq mi (0.00 km^{2})
- Elevation: 217 ft (66 m)

Population (2020)
  - Total: 19,259
  - Density: 3,871.1/sq mi (1,494.65/km^{2})
- Time zone: UTC-5 (Eastern (EST))
  - Summer (DST): UTC-4 (EDT)
- ZIP Codes: 11791, 11773
- Area codes: 516, 363
- FIPS code: 36-72554
- GNIS feature ID: 0970692

Syosset /saɪˈɒsɪt/ is a hamlet and census-designated place (CDP) located within the Town of Oyster Bay in Nassau County, on the North Shore of Long Island, in New York, United States. The population was 19,259 at the time of the 2020 census.

== History ==
The location of what is now Syosset was originally inhabited by Matinecock Native Americans. In the 17th century, European colonists – primarily the Dutch and English – began to settle the area.

In 1962, Syosset Hospital – the hamlet's local hospital – was established. Located on Jericho Turnpike (NY 25), the hospital's opening provided the growing suburban community with improved, local medical care and facilities.

== Geography ==
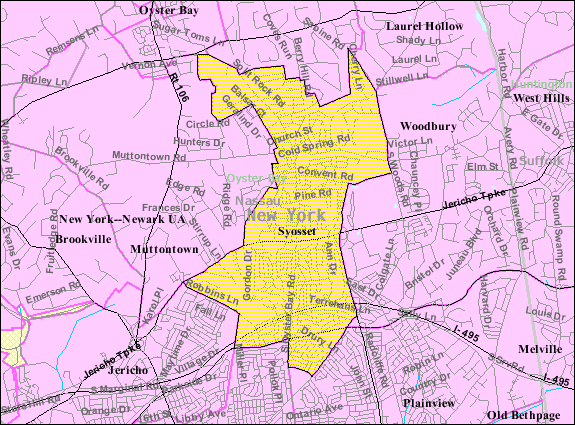
U.S. Census map of Syosset

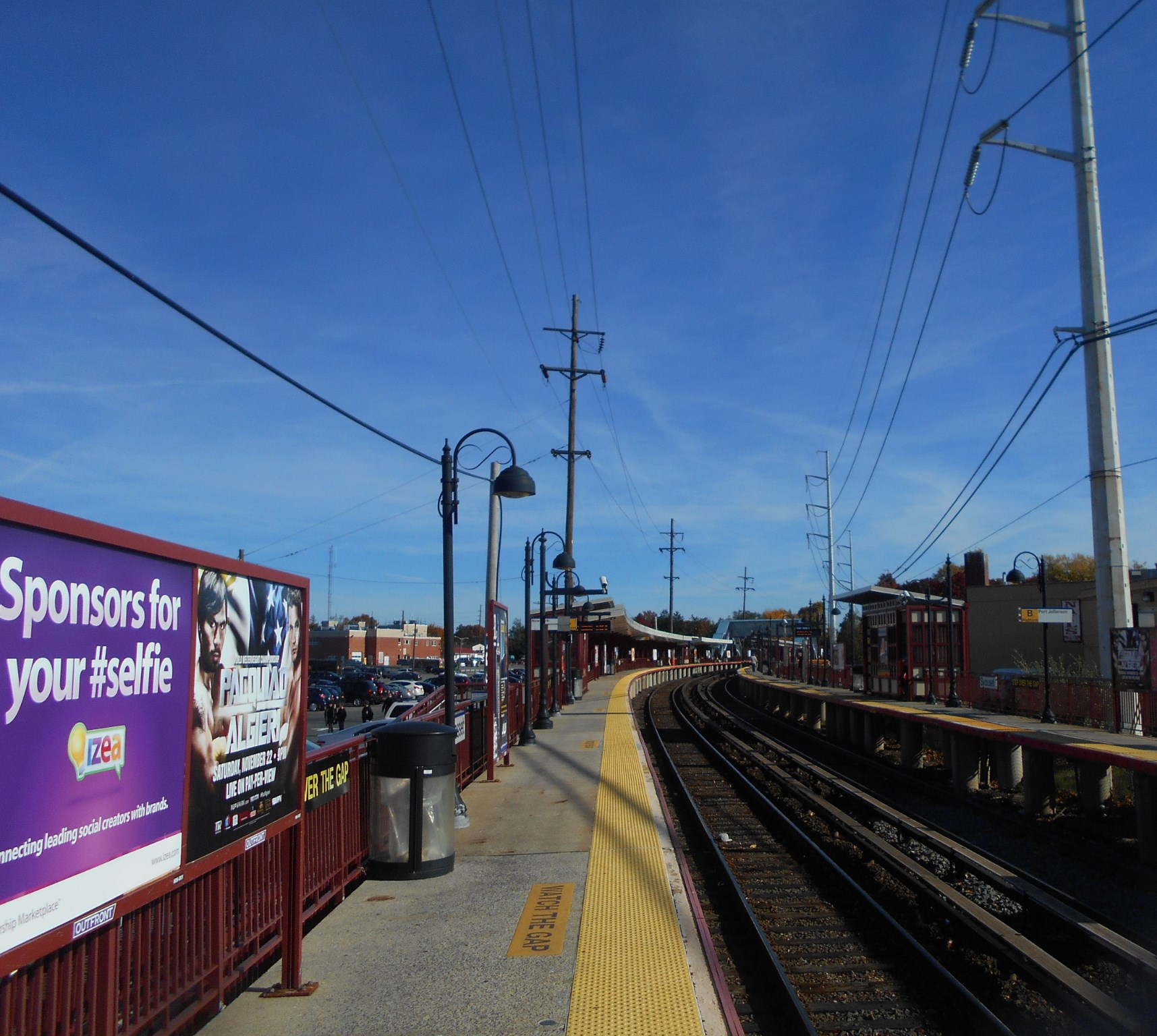
The Long Island Rail Road's Syosset station, located within the hamlet, in 2014

According to the U.S. Census Bureau, Syosset has a total area of 5.0 square miles (13 km^{2}), all land. Syosset absorbed the hamlet and former CDP of Locust Grove for the 1990 census.

The CDP gained some territory from the village of Muttontown between the 2000 census and 2010 census, and also lost some territory, which was annexed to the village of Laurel Hollow.

Syosset is approximately 32 miles (50 km) east of Midtown Manhattan, 14 miles (20 km) east of the eastern border with Queens, 23 miles (40 km) southeast of the Throgs Neck Bridge, and 168 miles (270 km) southeast of Albany, the state capital. It borders Oyster Bay and Laurel Hollow to the north, Woodbury to the east, Plainview and Hicksville to the south, and Jericho and Muttontown to the west. Syosset is accessible to New York City by the Long Island Rail Road (LIRR) and the Long Island Expressway and Northern State Parkway by car.

Syosset is served by the Syosset LIRR station, the Syosset Post Office, the Syosset Central School District, the Syosset Public Library, and the Syosset Fire Department. It is additionally served by the Jericho Water District – except for a small portion at the CDP's southeastern edge, which is instead within the Plainview Water District.

=== Greater Syosset area ===
The Greater Syosset area consists of 2 villages and 2 unincorporated hamlets

- Syosset
- Woodbury
- Muttontown
- Laurel Hollow

== Demographics ==
Historical population
Census	Pop.	Note	%±
1990	18,967		—
2000	18,544		−2.2%
2010	18,829		1.5%
2020	19,259		2.3%
U.S. Decennial Census

=== 2020 census ===
As of the 2020 census, Syosset had a population of 19,259. The median age was 43.0 years. 25.4% of residents were under the age of 18 and 17.1% of residents were 65 years of age or older. For every 100 females there were 97.2 males, and for every 100 females age 18 and over there were 93.5 males age 18 and over.

100.0% of residents lived in urban areas, while 0.0% lived in rural areas.

There were 6,033 households in Syosset, of which 44.1% had children under the age of 18 living in them. Of all households, 73.4% were married-couple households, 8.1% were households with a male householder and no spouse or partner present, and 16.1% were households with a female householder and no spouse or partner present. About 12.4% of all households were made up of individuals and 8.2% had someone living alone who was 65 years of age or older.

There were 6,293 housing units, of which 4.1% were vacant. The homeowner vacancy rate was 1.4% and the rental vacancy rate was 8.4%.

Racial composition as of the 2020 census
Race	Number	Percent
White	10,846	56.3%
Black or African American	128	0.7%
American Indian and Alaska Native	29	0.2%
Asian	6,961	36.1%
Native Hawaiian and Other Pacific Islander	3	0.0%
Some other race	294	1.5%
Two or more races	998	5.2%
Hispanic or Latino (of any race)	971	5.0%

=== Other demographics ===
Like many other places on the North Shore of Long Island, Syosset has a large Jewish population, as well as a large number of residents of Italian and East Asian origin. 35.4% of the population spoke a language other than English at home – mostly Chinese or Korean.

The median income for a household in Syosset was $180,297, and the median income for a family was $223,508. Males had a median income of $109,742 versus $77,038 for females. The per capita income for Syosset was $78,230. About 1.6% of families and 2.8% of the population were below the poverty line, including 2.4% of those under age 18 and 4.3% of those age 65 or over. The median home value is $944,786, while the average listing price of a home in the CDP was $1,164,815.

== Education ==
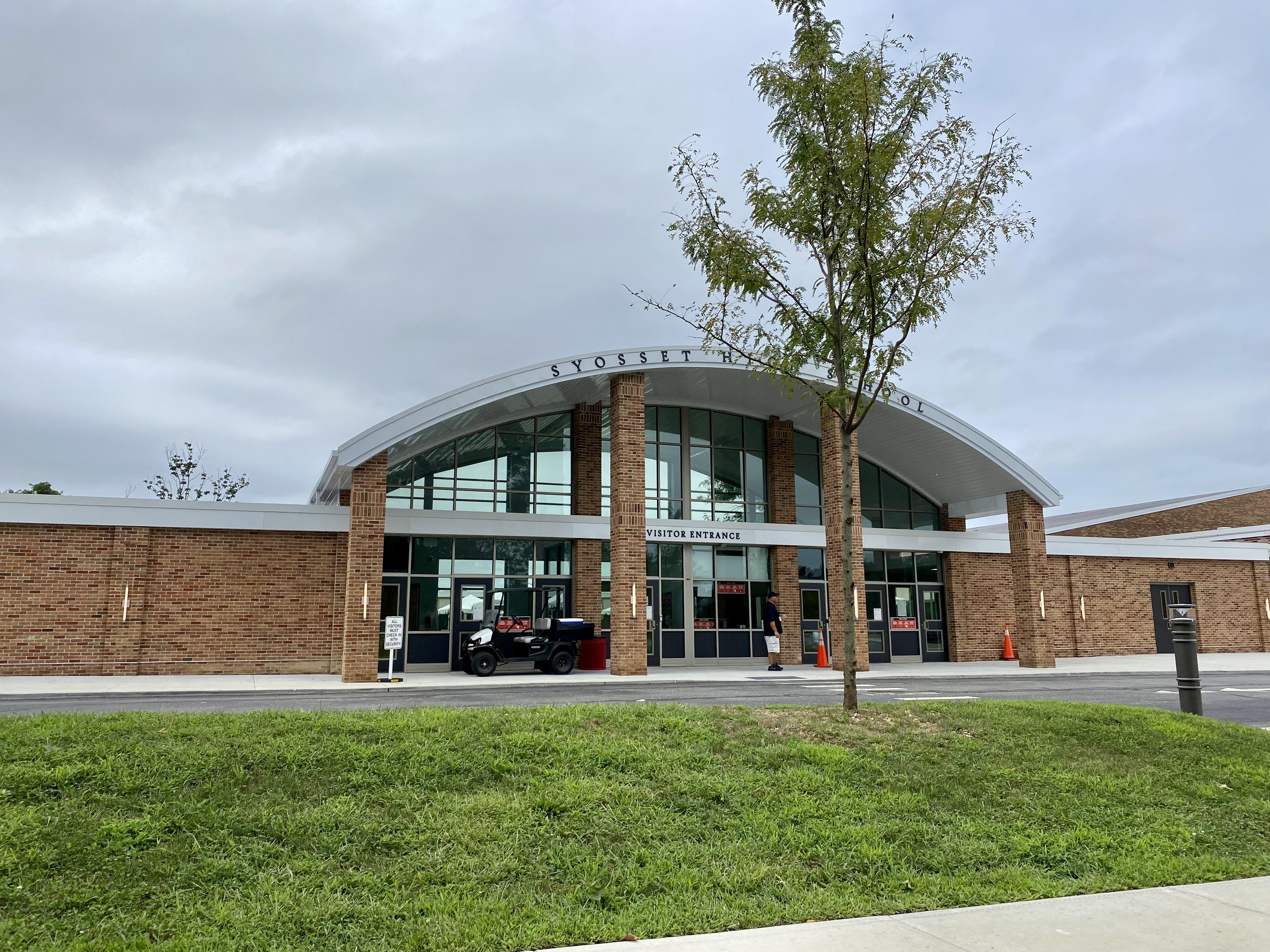
Syosset High School in 2021

Syosset is located almost entirely within the Syosset Central School District, spare for a small part of its northwestern tip, which is located within the Oyster Bay-East Norwich Central School District. Accordingly, children residing within Syosset who attend public school go to school in one of these two districts, depending on where they live within the CDP.

== Notable people ==
- 3lau – DJ; born and raised in Syosset.
- Judd Apatow – Screenwriter, television producer, and film producer.
- Jay Bienstock – Emmy Award–winning producer, Survivor and The Apprentice; grew up in Syosset.
- Sue Bird – Israeli-American Women's National Basketball Association point guard, 4× WNBA champion, 5× Olympic champion, 12× All-Star (Seattle Storm).
- Richard Bishop – Olympic gymnast.
- Alan S. Blinder – Economist, professor of Economics & Public Affairs at Princeton University, vice chairman of the Board of Governors of the United States Federal Reserve (1994–1996), writer, author, and columnist.
- Leslie Buck – Businessman, designer of the Anthora coffee cup.
- Elaine Chao – Former U.S. Secretary of Transportation; wife of United States Senator Addison "Mitch" McConnell and Syosset High School graduate.
- George Drakoulias – Music producer and supervisor.
- Charles T. Duryea – Former member of the New York State Assembly.
- Ben Ehrenreich – Novelist.
- William Everdell – Historian.
- Alex Flinn – Novelist; grew up in Syosset and Miami.
- Bev Francis, IFBB – Professional Australian female bodybuilder, powerlifter, and national shot put champion.
- Sibel Galindez – Actress.
- Paul Ginsparg – Professor of physics and information science at Cornell University; founder of arxiv.org.
- Jared Grasso – College basketball coach.
- Eric Haber – Professional poker player and hedge-fund manager.
- Chris Heintz – Former MLB player and current manager of Minnesota Twins minor league affiliate.
- Alfred Day Hershey (1908–1997) Nobel Prize–winning bacteriologist and geneticist, died in Syosset.
- Michael Isikoff – Investigative journalist; grew up in Syosset.
- Michael Lohan – Television personality; father of actress Lindsay Lohan.
- Jon Lovett – Podcast host and screenwriter; former speechwriter for Barack Obama.
- Derick Martini – Screenwriter and film director.
- Robert Maschio – Actor, Dr. Todd "The Todd" Quinlan on Scrubs.
- Idina Menzel – Actress and singer.
- Grant Napear – Broadcast journalist; Sacramento Kings (NBA) play-by-play announcer.
- Ed Newman – Former All-Pro offensive guard for the Miami Dolphins.
- Eric Nystrom – NHL player; son of four time New York Islanders Stanley Cup champion Bob Nystrom.
- Bruce Pecheur – Model and actor.
- Natalie Portman – Actress.
- Bruce Randall – Mr. Universe 1959.
- Aesop Rock – Hip-hop musician; born at Syosset Hospital.
- Sal Romano – MLB pitcher for the Cincinnati Reds; born in Syosset.
- Felissa Rose – Actress.
- Howie Rose – sportscaster for New York Mets and the New York Islanders.
- Gabe Rotter – Novelist, television writer, and producer.
- Jim Rowinski – Former NBA player; Big Ten MVP.
- Dave Rubin – Comedian and television personality.
- Christopher "Mad Dog" Russo – Sportscaster and sports journalist.
- Rob Scuderi – NHL player and Stanley Cup champion with the Pittsburgh Penguins.
- Gail G. Shapiro – Pediatric allergist.
- Mikey Wax – Musician.
- Meg Wolitzer – Novelist.
- Irad Young (born 1971) – American-Israeli soccer player; grew up in Baldwin and Syosset.
- Jordan Young – Television producer and writer; born and raised in Syosset.
- Nicholas DiZinno - Industry Professor at New York University's Tandon School of Engineering.

== In popular culture ==
=== Literature ===
- The Wednesday Wars by Gary D. Schmidt is set in Syosset in 1967.

=== Film and television ===
- In Adam Sandler's Mr. Deeds, Winona Ryder's character says she is originally from Syosset.
- In New York Minute, Mary-Kate and Ashley Olsen's characters live with their father in Syosset.
- Secrets and Wives features wealthy women from Old Westbury, Roslyn, and Syosset.
- In Soapdish, Whoopi Goldberg's character reveals that Montana Moorhead was formerly Milton Moorhead of Syosset.
- In the Comedy Central show Review (season 1, episode 3) the viewer question about pancakes comes from "Nick from Syosset, New York".
- In the 2021 television series Gossip Girl, the character Julien Calloway turns down a sponsorship from a strip mall in Syosset in the first episode of season 1.
- In Only Murders in the Building, the character Oliver Putnam says that he went to a wedding in Syosset.
- In The Kominsky Method, Mindy's boyfriend Martin grew up in Syosset.
- In HBO's Girls, the character Ray Ploshansky mentions that he has an aunt who lives in Syosset.
- In the 2019 crime drama film Bad Education, Syosset's school district is mentioned several times as being a competitor of nearby Roslyn Union Free School District, where events take place.

=== Science ===
- Asteroid 250774 Syosset, discovered by Richard Kowalski in 2005, was named for the hamlet on Long Island. The official naming citation was published by the Minor Planet Center on January 9, 2020 (M.P.C. 120069).

== Syosset Fire Department ==
The Syosset Fire Department (SFD) consists of five all-volunteer fire companies and one all-volunteer EMS company. The SFD operates out of three fire stations, located throughout the area which encompasses Syosset, Woodbury, and parts of Muttontown, Oyster Bay Cove, Laurel Hollow, Cold Spring Harbor, East Norwich, Jericho, Hicksville, and Plainview. With a territory of 17.5 square miles (45 km^{2}), the department is the largest in Nassau County by coverage area. They operate a fire apparatus fleet of five engines, one reserve ladder, one truck, one rescue, three ambulances, and several special, support, and reserve units.
