= Hicksville station =

Long Island Rail Road station in Nassau County, New York

Hicksville
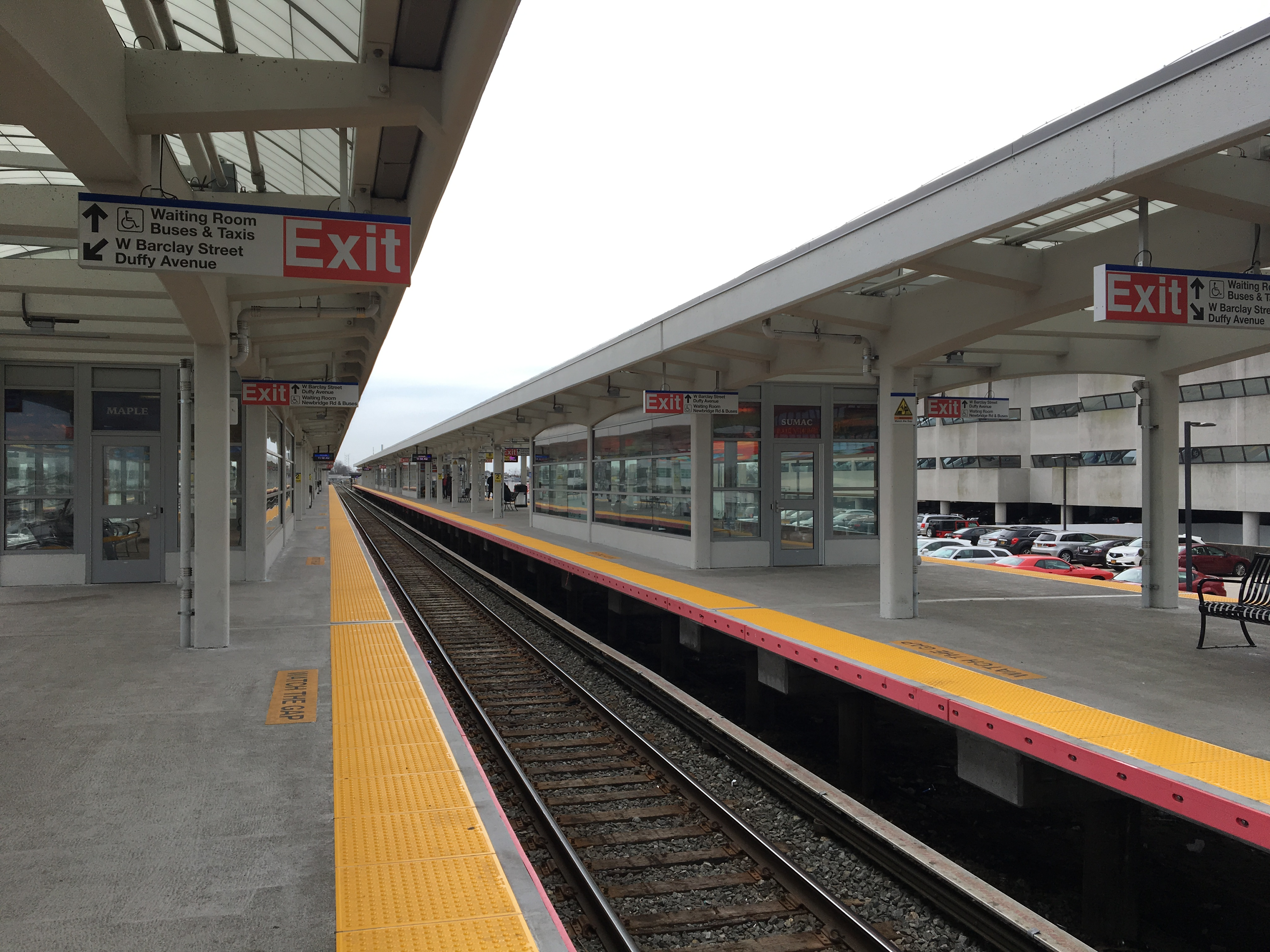
- Hicksville station in March 2019

General information
- Location: Newbridge Road and West Barclay Street; Hicksville, New York
- Coordinates: 40.767101°N 73.528686°W
- Owner: Long Island Rail Road
- Lines: Main Line; Port Jefferson Branch
- Distance: 24.8 mi (39.9 km) from Long Island City
- Platforms: 2 island platforms
- Tracks: 3
- Connections: Nassau Inter-County Express: n20H, n22, n24, n48, n49, n78, n79, n80 Suffolk County Transit: Long Island Express Service

Construction
- Parking: Yes; Town of Oyster Bay permits and private parking garages
- Cycle facilities: Yes
- Accessible: Yes

Other information
- Station code: HVL
- Fare zone: 7

History
- Opened: March 1, 1837
- Rebuilt: 1873, 1909, 1962, 2014–2018
- Electrified: October 19, 1970; 750 V (DC) third rail

Passengers
- 2012–14: 21,924 per weekday
- Rank: 3 out of 126

Services
Preceding station	Long Island Rail Road	Following station
Westbury toward Penn Station, Grand Central or Long Island City	Port Jefferson Branch	Syosset toward Huntington or Port Jefferson
Mineola toward Penn Station or Grand Central	Ronkonkoma Branch	Bethpage toward Ronkonkoma
Mineola toward Penn Station or Long Island City	Montauk Branch limited service	Babylon toward Montauk
Former services
Preceding station	Long Island Rail Road	Following station
Westbury toward Long Island City or Penn Station	Main Line	Grumman toward Greenport
Terminus	Wading River Branch	Landia toward Wading River
Future services
Preceding station	Amtrak	Following station
Jamaica toward Norfolk, Newport News or Christiansburg	Northeast Regional	Ronkonkoma Terminus
Location

Hicksville is a commuter rail station on the Main Line and Port Jefferson Branch of the Long Island Rail Road, located in Hicksville, New York. It is the busiest station east of Jamaica, Penn Station, and Grand Central Madison by combined weekday/weekend ridership.

The station is located at Newbridge Road (NY 106) and West Barclay Street. It has two island platforms and three tracks. It is wheelchair accessible, with an elevator to each platform from street level. It is served by eight Nassau Inter-County Express routes, one Suffolk County Transit route, and two cab services on the ground level of the station.

Beginning in approximately 2028, Hicksville will be served by Amtrak's Northeast Regional trains heading to and from Ronkonkoma.

== History ==
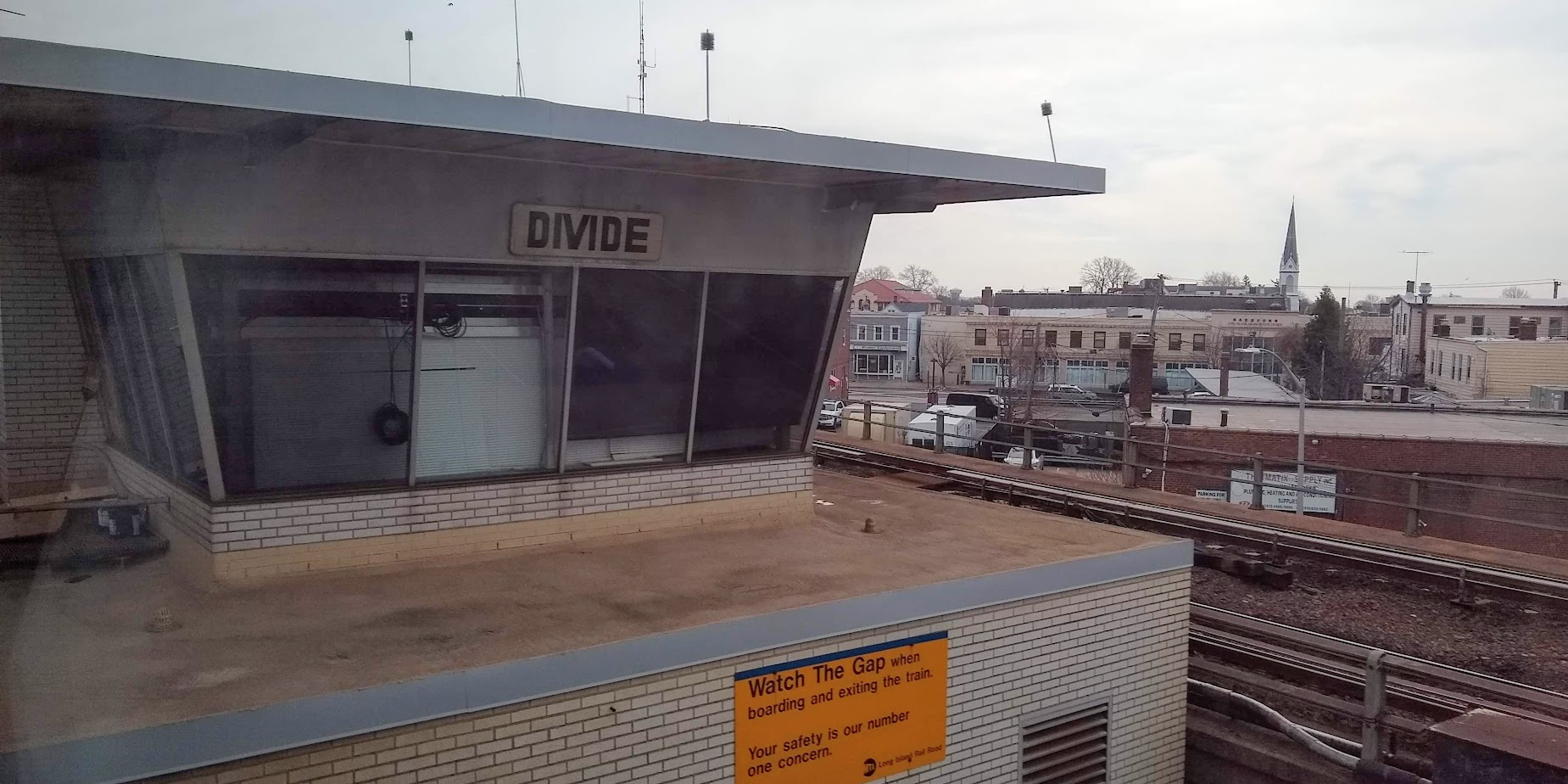
DIVIDE Interlocking tower, located just east of the station

Hicksville station's first depot opened on March 1, 1837, and it served as the temporary terminus of the LIRR. Both the station and the eponymous hamlet were established by Valentine Hicks – the son of an abolitionist preacher who also briefly served as President of the LIRR.

In 1841, the Main Line was extended east from Hicksville to Farmingdale, after a delay caused by the depression that had begun with the Panic of 1837.

In 1854, the station gained a line known as the Hicksville and Syosset Railroad that later became the Port Jefferson Branch of the LIRR. Ten years later, on July 15, 1864, Hicksville's first depot burned down. A second depot opened in September 1873, and was moved to a private location in 1909. The third depot opened on October 30, 1909, and was razed in November 1962 as the current elevated structure was being built. The elevated station opened on September 12, 1964.

In 1965, an eagle sculpture from the original Penn Station, which had recently been demolished, was moved to the Hicksville station. The sculpture was subsequently installed in the station's parking lot, where it remains standing today.

In October 1970, third-rail electrification on the Main Line was extended from Mineola through Hicksville to Huntington thereby introducing direct electric train service to Penn Station (Hicksville customers had previously been required to change trains at Jamaica). The first electric train to serve the Hicksville station ran on October 19th of that year.

On October 30, 1979, the MTA took over control of the station's escalators from the Hicksville Escalator District – a special district responsible for maintaining and paying for the escalators at the station; the controversial district was dissolved upon this transfer of ownership.

The station underwent a full renovation beginning in early 2014. The $121 million renovation included replacing station platforms, escalators, elevators, waiting rooms, canopies, and lighting. Security cameras were also added during the renovation. Construction was estimated to last through 2017, and was expected to be completed by August 2018. Platform A was the first platform to be rebuilt, reopening in September 2017. The electrical substation at Hicksville station will be replaced as part of the Main Line third track project. The rehabilitation project was officially completed in September 2018.

== Station layout ==
Generally, Platform A serves westbound trains and Platform B serves eastbound trains. Track 2 operates with the flow of rush hour, handling westbound trains in the morning and eastbound trains in the evening, though some westbound trains will use Platform B. Most Montauk Branch trains pass through the station without stopping. East of the station, the Port Jefferson Branch splits from the Main Line at DIVIDE Interlocking.

== Future ==
In January 2025, it was officially announced that a new Long Island branch of Amtrak's Northeast Regional, running east to Ronkonkoma via the LIRR's Main Line, would serve the Hicksville station, with an intermediate stop at Jamaica east of Penn Station. The year prior, Amtrak conducted a study of the new service through a $500 million federal grant. As of January 2025, Amtrak service is anticipated to begin in 2028.
