= Westbury High School (Old Westbury, New York) =

Coordinates: 40°46′08″N 73°35′16″W

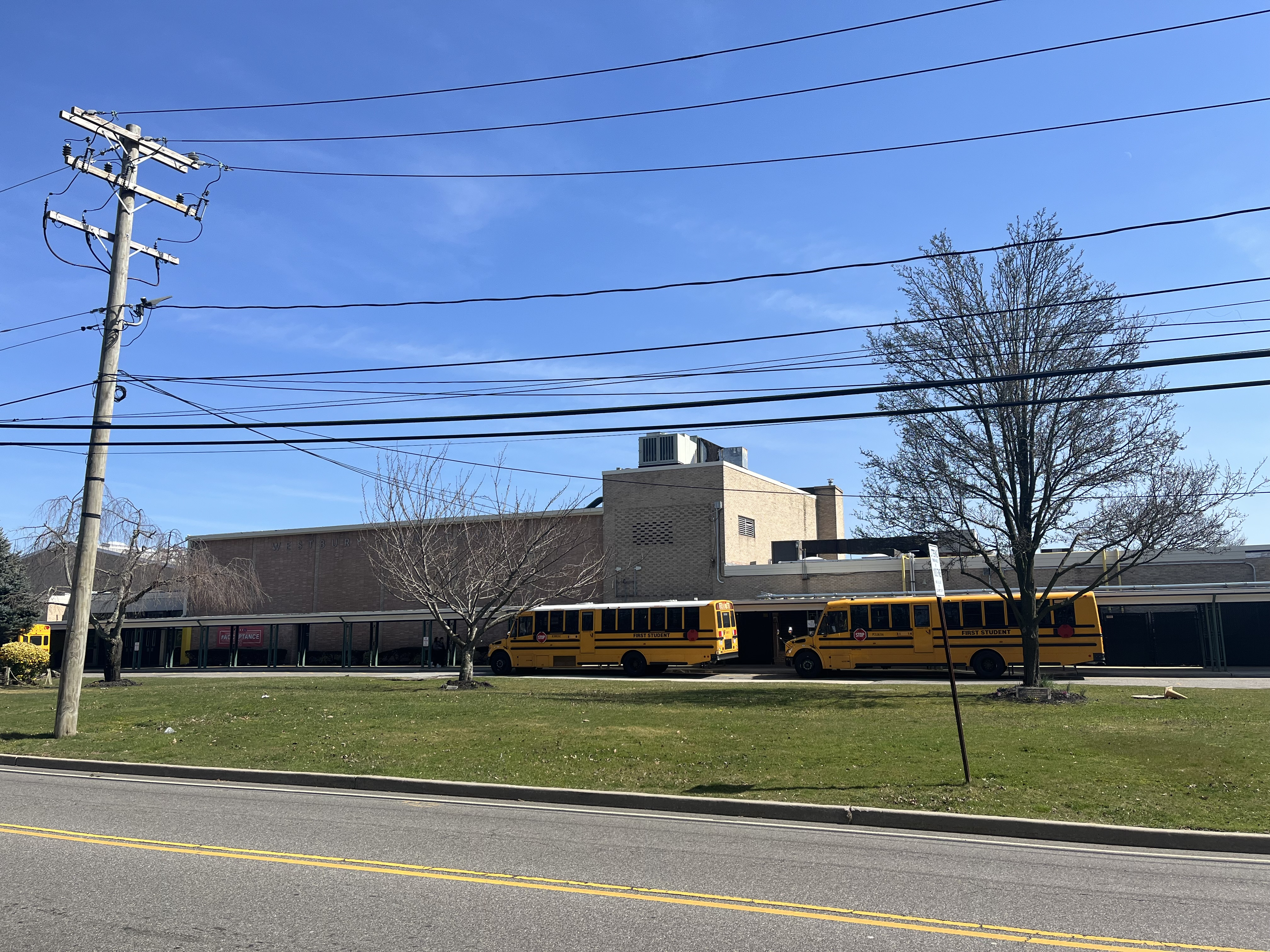
- Westbury High School in 2024

Location
- 1 Post Road, Old Westbury, New York 11568; United States

Information
- Established: 1921 (at current location since 1958)
- Faculty: 102.8 FTEs
- Enrollment: 1,621 (as of 2018–2019)
- Student to teacher ratio: 15.8:1
- Colors: Green and Gold
- Mascot: Dragon
- Website: https://www.westburyschools.org/westbury-high-school

Westbury High School (also known as Westbury Senior High School) is a public high school located in the Village of Old Westbury, in Nassau County, New York, United States. It is operated by – and is the sole high school within – the Westbury Union Free School District.

== Overview ==
Westbury High School serves 1,500 students from locations on and near the North Shore of Long Island, in Nassau County. It serves Westbury Village, New Cassel, New York and Old Westbury. Westbury High School is accredited by the Middle States Association of Colleges and Schools Commission on Secondary Schools.

As of the 2018–2019 school year, the school had an enrollment of 1,621 students and 102.8 classroom teachers (on an FTE basis), for a student–teacher ratio of 15.8:1. There were 1,238 students (76% of enrollment) eligible for free lunch.

== Notable alumni ==
- Michael Cimino – Class of 1956, Yale University Class of 1961, film director, film producer, screenwriter, author
- Dennis DuVal – Class of 1970, Syracuse University Class of 1974, NBA basketball player (Washington Bullets), Hall of Fame athlete
- Joe DePre – Class of 1966, St. John's University Class of 1970, ABA basketball player (New York Nets 1971–1973)
- Gary Holder-Winfield – Class of 1991, Connecticut State Senator, 10th District
- Mims - Class of 1999, rapper
- Joel Ross - tennis player
- Gary Winfield - politician

== See also ==
- The Wheatley School
- State University of New York at Old Westbury
