= Westbury, New York =

- Village
- Incorporated Village of Westbury
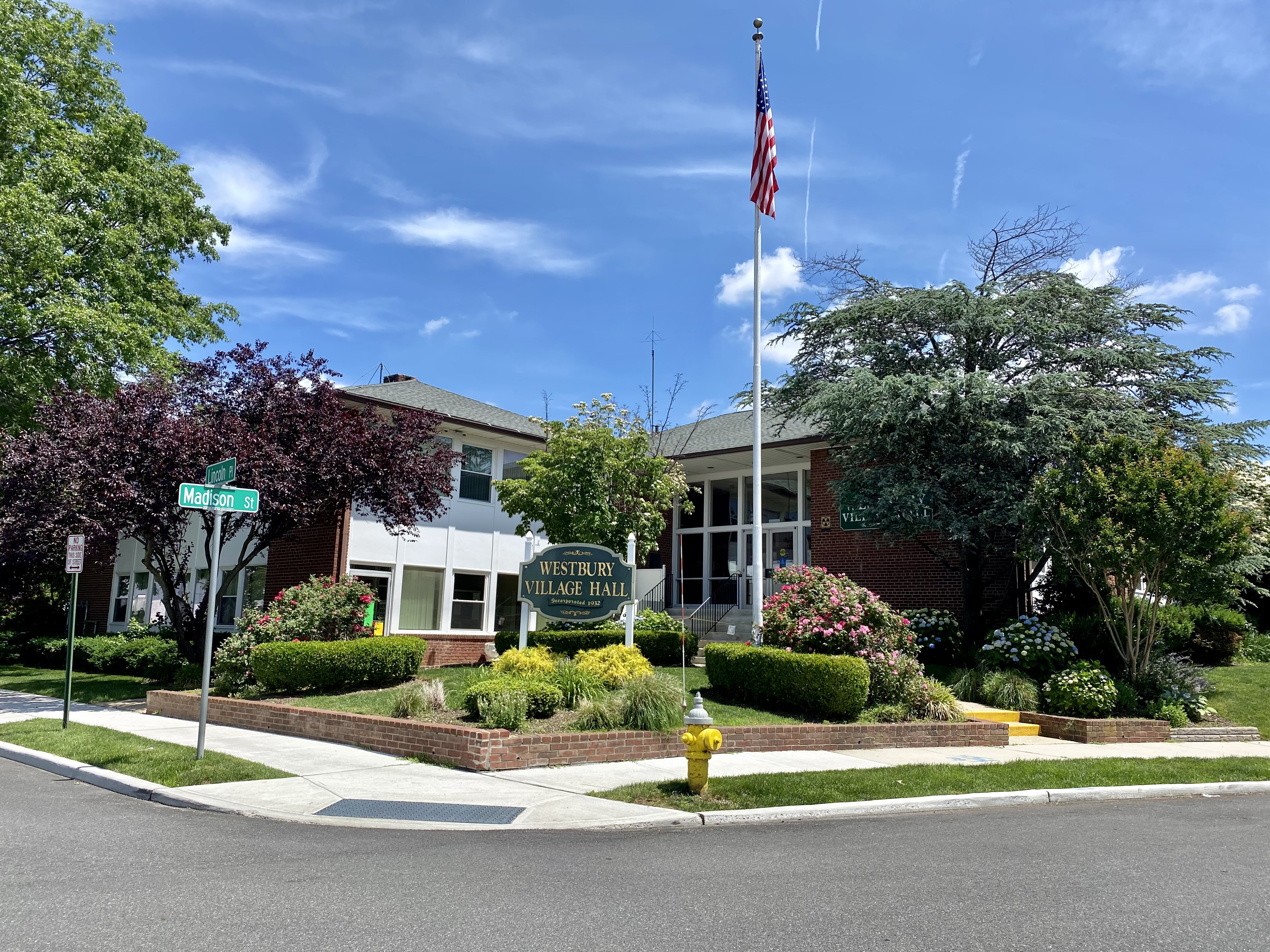
- Westbury Village Hall on June 9, 2021

- Official seal of Westbury
- Motto: "Community for All Seasons"
- Location in Nassau County and the state of New York

- Location on Long Island Location within the state of New York
- Coordinates: 40°45′32″N 73°35′17″W
- Country: United States
- State: New York
- County: Nassau
- Town: North Hempstead
- Incorporated: 1932
- Named for: Westbury, Wiltshire, England

Government
  - Mayor: Peter I. Cavallaro

Area
  - Total: 2.34 sq mi (6.07 km^{2})
  - Land: 2.34 sq mi (6.07 km^{2})
  - Water: 0 sq mi (0.00 km^{2})
- Elevation: 102 ft (31 m)

Population (2020)
  - Total: 15,864
  - Density: 6,769.2/sq mi (2,613.59/km^{2})
- Time zone: UTC-5 (Eastern (EST))
  - Summer (DST): UTC-4 (EDT)
- ZIP codes: 11590
- Area codes: 516, 363
- FIPS code: 36-79444
- GNIS feature ID: 0970896
- Website: villageofwestbury.gov

Westbury is a village mostly located in the southeastern portion of the Town of North Hempstead with a small portion in the Town of Oyster Bay in Nassau County, on Long Island, in New York, United States. It is considered the anchor community of the Greater Westbury area. The population was 15,404 at the time of the 2020 census.

== History ==
The first settlers in what is now the Village of Westbury arrived in 1658 in the region known as the Hempstead Plains. Many of the early settlers were Quakers.

Westbury's Jericho Turnpike, which provides connection to Mineola and Syosset as well as to the Long Island Expressway (or LIE), was once a trail used by the Massapequa Indians. As far back as the 17th century, it served as a divider between the early homesteads north of the Turnpike and the Hempstead Plains to its south. Today, it serves as a state highway complex.

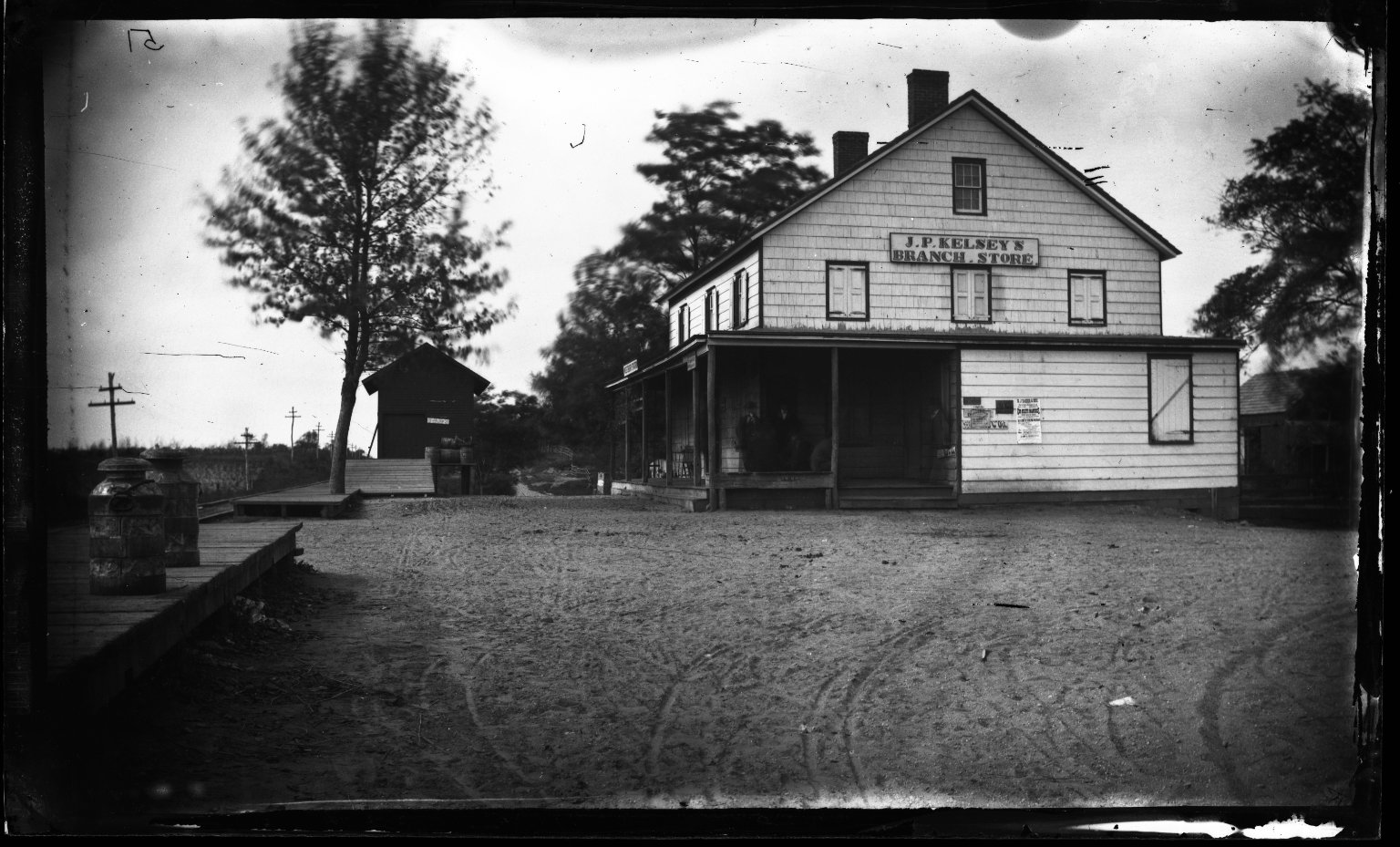
George Bradford Brainerd, J. P. Kelsey's Store, Westbury, Long Island, c. 1872–1887 (Brooklyn Museum)

In 1657, Captain John Seaman purchased 12,000 acres (49 km^{2}) from the Algonquian Tribe of the Massapequa Indians. In 1658, Richard Stites and his family built their homestead in this area. Theirs was the only family farm until an English Quaker, Edmond Titus, and his son Samuel joined them and settled in an area of Hempstead Plains, known today as the Village of Westbury. In 1675 Henry Willis, also an English Quaker, named the area "Westbury", after Westbury, Wiltshire, his hometown in England. Other Quaker families who were also seeking a place to freely express their religious beliefs joined the Tituses and Willises. The first Society of Friends meeting house was built in 1700. The early history of Westbury and that of the Friends are so interconnected that they are essentially the same.

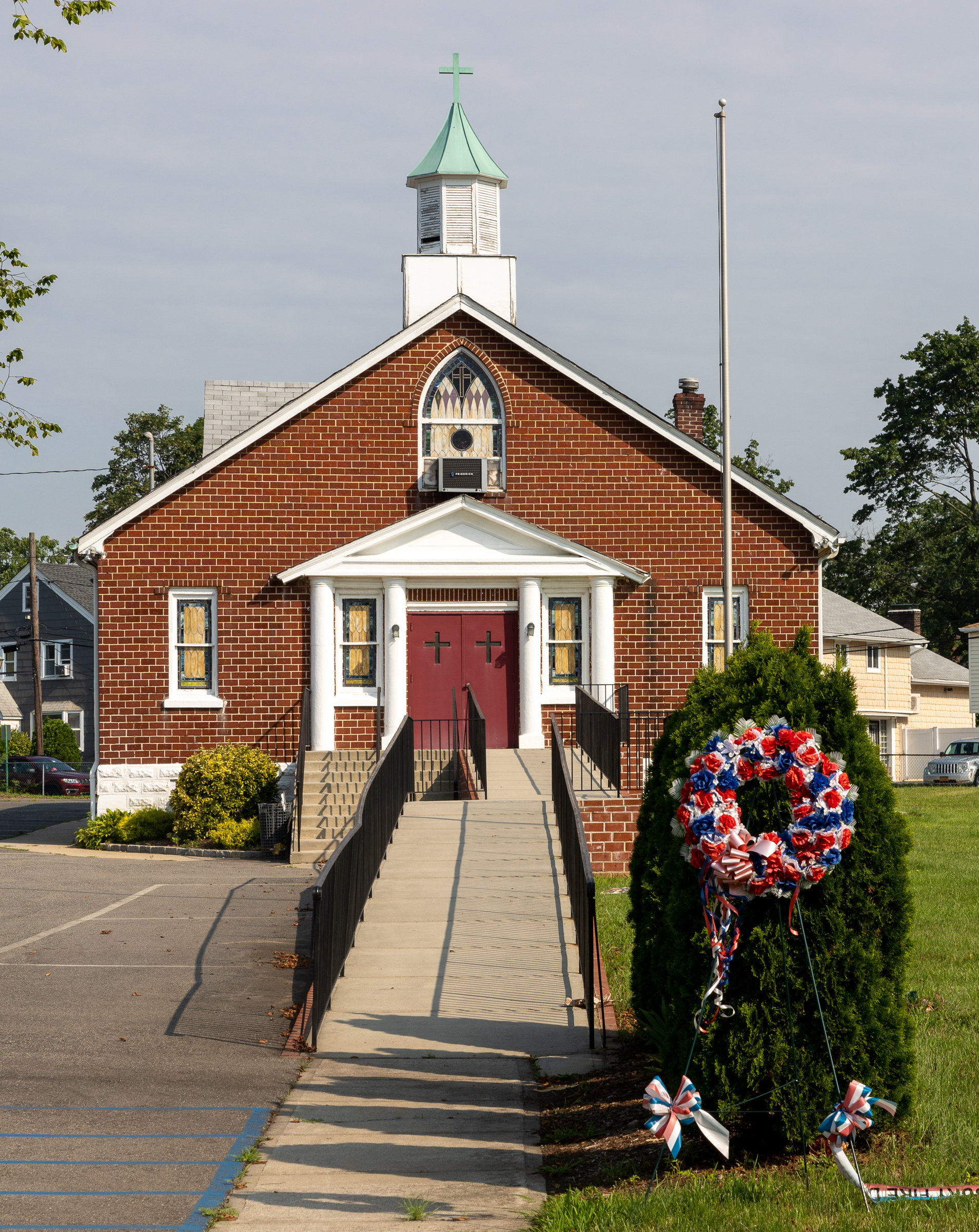
Westbury A.M.E. Zion Church

These settlers, like many other landowners throughout the colonies, owned slaves. In 1775, compelled by their religious beliefs, the Quakers freed all 154 African Americans that they owned. Many of these freed men and women built their own homesteads on the open land near the sheep grazing pastures. Their new community consisted of farms and dairies. In 1834, with Quaker assistance, they and their descendants built the New Light Baptist Church. In 1867 the congregation moved to 247 Grand Boulevard, and in 1892 changed their name to Westbury A.M.E. Zion Church. In 2014, the congregation celebrated its 180th anniversary. The building still stands on the corner of Union Ave. and Grand Blvd.

The outbreak of the American Revolution disrupted Westbury's tranquility. From the beginning of the war until 1783, British soldiers and German-speaking mercenaries occupied local homes, confiscated livestock, and cleared the woods for firewood for the troops. With the close of the war, Westbury received its third group of settlers, the Hessians, mostly from Hesse-Cassel in the Holy Roman Empire, who chose not to return to their home country. Instead, they remained in an area now known as New Cassel, a name chosen in honor of the part of Hesse from which most had come.

By 1837, the Long Island Rail Road had built through Westbury. Schedules from March 1837 mention a stop at Westbury, but by June list Carle Place instead, with schedules from 1842 listing both. In 1840, the first public school was built. The railroad made it easier for Italian and Irish immigrants to work Westbury's farms and in 1857, St. Brigid's Parish was founded.

At the same time more African-American families came to the area via the Underground Railroad. For some, Westbury was only one stop on the way to Canada, but several stayed in this area after being harbored in secret rooms in the homes of the Quakers. In the years after the Civil War, until near the turn of the century, the few stores that comprised the small village around the railroad depot, were mainly black owned.

The Village moved from its agricultural setting in the late 19th century when the very wealthy began to settle and build mansions. This area is now known as Old Westbury. Post Avenue soon became a commerce center to serve the surrounding estates. Various estate workers began to move in as well. Streets were mapped out and constructed. Post Avenue received electricity in 1902 and in 1914 a water company was founded.

From the 1850s to the 1900s, Westbury's population and ethnic diversity began to rise as many people of Irish and Italian origins continued to settle. New Cassel began to be developed in the first quarter of the 20th century.

In 1927, Charles Lindbergh took off from Roosevelt Field, a couple of hundred yards south of downtown, for the history-making flight to Paris, marking probably the most famous event tied to the Greater Westbury area.

In 1932, in response newa that northern Westbury planned to incorporate as its own village – and thereby leaving the southern part of Westbury without a name, local residents proposed incorporating the greater area as the Village of Westbury. Held on March 28, 1932 – a few weeks after North Westbury unsuccessfully voted on its incorporation, the referendum vote on whether to incorporate the Village of Westbury was held, in which Westbury residents approved the village's creation, voting 200-24 in favor of incorporation. The village's boundaries included Grantsville (the section south of Union Avenue around A.M.E. Zion church) – but it did not take in New Cassel to the east, as the few families that lived there feared that being included in the new village would only unnecessarily increase their taxes.

In 1938, the Northern State Parkway was constructed through the area. In 1941, the World War II began. Westbury sent 1,400 persons to serve the country. This was 20% of the community's population, making it the highest percentage of any comparable community in the United States.

In the mid-1950s, Westbury virtually ran out of undeveloped land and with it came the end of the building boom. In 1940, Westbury listed its population at 4,525. By 1960, Westbury's population had grown to 14,757, according to the census data for that year. Many Caribbean and Latin American families began to settle during this time and in the decades that followed.

As the birth rate declined, people married at a later age and the high cost of buying a home prevented many people from assuming a mortgage in the 1970s, Westbury again underwent change, becoming more urban and city-like over time.

== Geography ==
According to the United States Census Bureau, the village has a total area of 2.3 square miles (6.0 km^{2}), all land.

Westbury is located about 18 miles (29 km) east of Manhattan.

=== Climate ===
According to the Köppen climate classification, Westbury has a Humid subtropical climate (type Cfa) with cool, wet winters and hot, humid summers. Precipitation is uniform throughout the year, with slight spring and fall peaks.

=== Greater Westbury area ===
In addition to Westbury Village itself, unincorporated regions surrounding its borders also use the Westbury name, including New Cassel, Salisbury (South Westbury), and parts of Jericho. For example, the Westbury Music Fair performing venue (now known as Flagstar at Westbury Music Fair), located in the Westbury postal zone, is part of the Jericho hamlet.

The region is grouped under the name Greater Westbury, a region that also includes organizations with common interests, such as those in New Cassel. The school districts that serve the Greater Westbury region, based on the boundaries, are the Westbury Union Free School District (including New Cassel) and the East Meadow Union Free School District. The only homes zoned for East Meadow Schools are actually located in the Hamlet of Salisbury (located within the Town of Hempstead), and are zoned for that district's W. T. Clark High School.

== Demographics ==
Historical population
Census	Pop.	Note	%±
1940	4,524		—
1950	7,112		57.2%
1960	14,757		107.5%
1970	15,362		4.1%
1980	13,871		−9.7%
1990	13,060		−5.8%
2000	14,263		9.2%
2010	15,146		6.2%
2020	15,864		4.7%
2021 (est.)	15,809	▼	−0.3%
U.S. Decennial Census

=== 2020 census ===
As of the 2020 census, Westbury had a population of 15,864. The median age was 41.0 years. 19.5% of residents were under the age of 18 and 18.6% of residents were 65 years of age or older. For every 100 females there were 95.2 males, and for every 100 females age 18 and over there were 94.3 males age 18 and over.

100.0% of residents lived in urban areas, while 0.0% lived in rural areas.

There were 5,083 households in Westbury, of which 32.6% had children under the age of 18 living in them. Of all households, 50.6% were married-couple households, 17.4% were households with a male householder and no spouse or partner present, and 26.8% were households with a female householder and no spouse or partner present. About 22.9% of all households were made up of individuals and 10.8% had someone living alone who was 65 years of age or older.

There were 5,265 housing units, of which 3.5% were vacant. The homeowner vacancy rate was 1.0% and the rental vacancy rate was 3.2%.

Racial composition as of the 2020 census
Race	Number	Percent
White	6,396	40.3%
Black or African American	2,811	17.7%
American Indian and Alaska Native	92	0.6%
Asian	1,499	9.4%
Native Hawaiian and Other Pacific Islander	6	0.0%
Some other race	3,073	19.4%
Two or more races	1,987	12.5%
Hispanic or Latino (of any race)	5,143	32.4%

=== 2010 census ===
As of the 2010 United States census, there were 15,146 people, 5,078 households, and 3,523 families residing in the village. The population density was 6,379.0 inhabitants per square mile (2,462.9/km^{2}). The racial makeup of the village was 66% White, 20% of the population are Hispanic White or White Latino, 12% African American, and 2.0% Asian.

There were 5,078 households, out of which 31.0% had children under the age of 18 living with them, 52.4% were married couples living together, 11.6% had a female householder with no husband present, and 30.6% were non-families. 24.4% of all households were made up of individuals, and 8.1% had someone living alone who was 65 years of age or older. The average household size was 3.0 and the average family size was 3.5.

=== Income and poverty ===
In 2010, the US Census Bureau estimated the median income for a household in the village was $100,000 and the median income for a family was $135,000. The per capita income for the village was $44,000.

=== Demographic profile ===
Westbury is made up of European Americans, Black Americans, Spanish Americans and Caribbeans; particularly Haitians, Guyanese, and Jamaicans. Many of the Hispanics are of Salvadoran, Honduran, and Mexican origin. Many of the remaining Italian-Americans in the village trace their origins to the town of Durazzano in Southern Italy, and are closely related. A great number still reside on the Hill across from Saint Brigid's Church. The nickname for the Village, "A Community for All Seasons," was adapted after The Greater Westbury Community Coalition ran a slogan contest shortly after the 1966 release of the Oscar-winning Best Movie, A Man for All Seasons. The film was about Sir Thomas More who was portrayed as a man of the utmost principle. The winning slogan: “A Community For All Seasons" was a take-off on the movie's title and was meant to suggest that Westbury was a good place to live, a place that stood for accepting people of all sorts, a community that embraced diversity.

== Government ==
As of April 2026, the Mayor of Westbury is Peter I. Cavallaro, the First Deputy Mayor is Steven L. Corte, the Second Deputy Mayor is Beaumont A. Jefferson, and the Village Trustees are Vincent Abbatiello, Steven L. Corte, Beaumont A. Jefferson, and Pedro A. Quintanilla.

=== Politics ===
In the 2024 U.S. presidential election, the majority of Westbury voters voted for Kamala D. Harris (D).

== Education ==
=== Schools ===
The Village of Westbury is served primarily by the Westbury Union Free School District, although the westernmost portions of the village are served by the Carle Place Union Free School District.

=== Library ===
Westbury, in its entirety, is served by the Westbury Memorial Public Library, with the portions zoned for Westbury's schools being located within the Westbury Library District and the portions zoned for Carle Place's schools serviced by the library through contract.

== Transportation ==
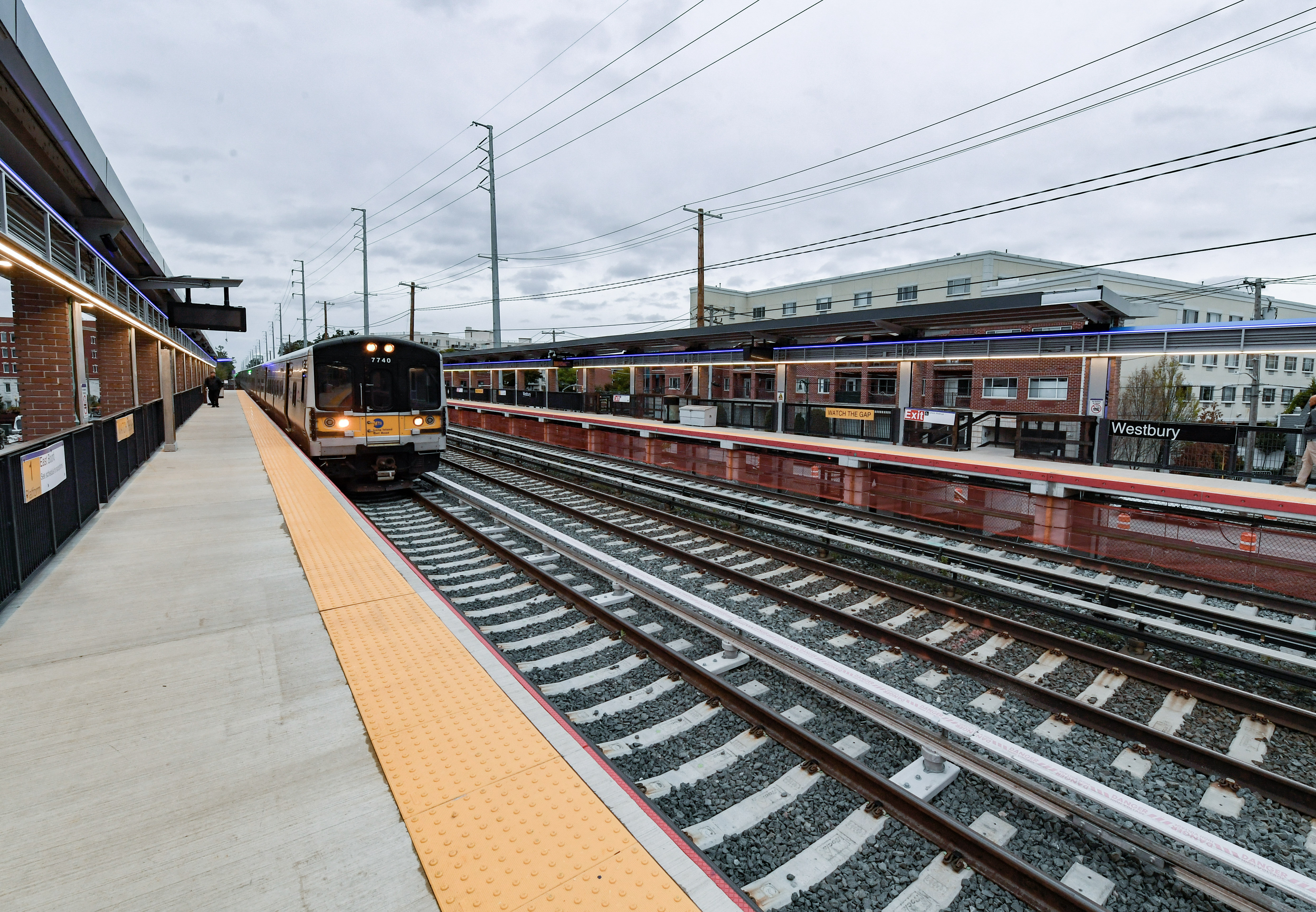
The Westbury LIRR station in 2022

Westbury is served by the Main Line of the Long Island Rail Road. It is also served by the following bus routes operated by Nassau Inter-County Express:

- n22: Jamaica—Hicksville via Hillside Avenue & Prospect Avenue
- n22X: Jamaica—Hicksville via Hillside Avenue & Prospect Avenue
- n24: Jamaica—Hicksville via Jericho Turnpike & Old Country Road
- n35: Westbury—Baldwin

== Notable people ==
- Bud Anderson (born 1956), Major League Baseball player, attended W. T. Clarke High School, Westbury
- Sarah Ban Breathnach, author
- Michael Cimino (1939–2016), Academy Award-winning film director of The Deer Hunter, attended W. T. Clarke High School, Salisbury
- Kevin Conroy (1955–2022), actor, voice of Batman in various media, most notably the DC Animated Universe
- Arthur Dobrin (born 1943), author and professor at Hofstra University
- Tom Donohue (born 1952), former catcher for the California Angels.
- Doctor Dré (born 1963), co-host of Yo! MTV Raps with Ed Lover and radio DJ
- Freddie Foxx a.k.a. Bumpy Knuckles in associated acts with Eric B., Gang Starr, Gang Starr Foundation, etc.
- Paul Hewitt (born 1963), men's basketball head coach at George Mason University and Georgia Tech
- Skip Jutze (born 1946), Major League Baseball player, Houston Astros, Seattle Mariners, St. Louis Cardinals.
- Ron Klimkowski (1944–2009), Major League Baseball player, attended W. T. Clarke High School, Westbury
- Nancy McKeon (born 1966), actress
- Philip McKeon (1964–2019), actor
- Bill O'Reilly (born 1949), Fox News talk show host
- DJ Rekha (born 1971), credited with starting New York's South Asian bhangra scene
- Irene Rosenfeld (born 1953), CEO of major corporations; born in Westbury and attended W. T. Clarke High School
- Joel Ross, tennis player
- Joe Satriani (born 1956), virtuoso guitarist, composer, producer and guitar teacher
- Matt Seelinger (born 1995), professional baseball player
- Steve Serio (born 1987), paralympic wheelchair basketball player.
- Tyson Walker (born 2000), college basketball player for the Michigan State Spartans
- Spann Watson (1916–2010), Tuskegee Airman, was a longtime resident of Westbury
- Geeta Citygirl (born 1971), actor and founding artistic director of SALAAM Theatre, the first South Asian not-for-profit, professional, theater company celebrating in America.

== See also ==
- List of municipalities in New York
- Old Westbury, New York
