= Martin "Bunky" Reid Park =

Park in Nassau County, New York

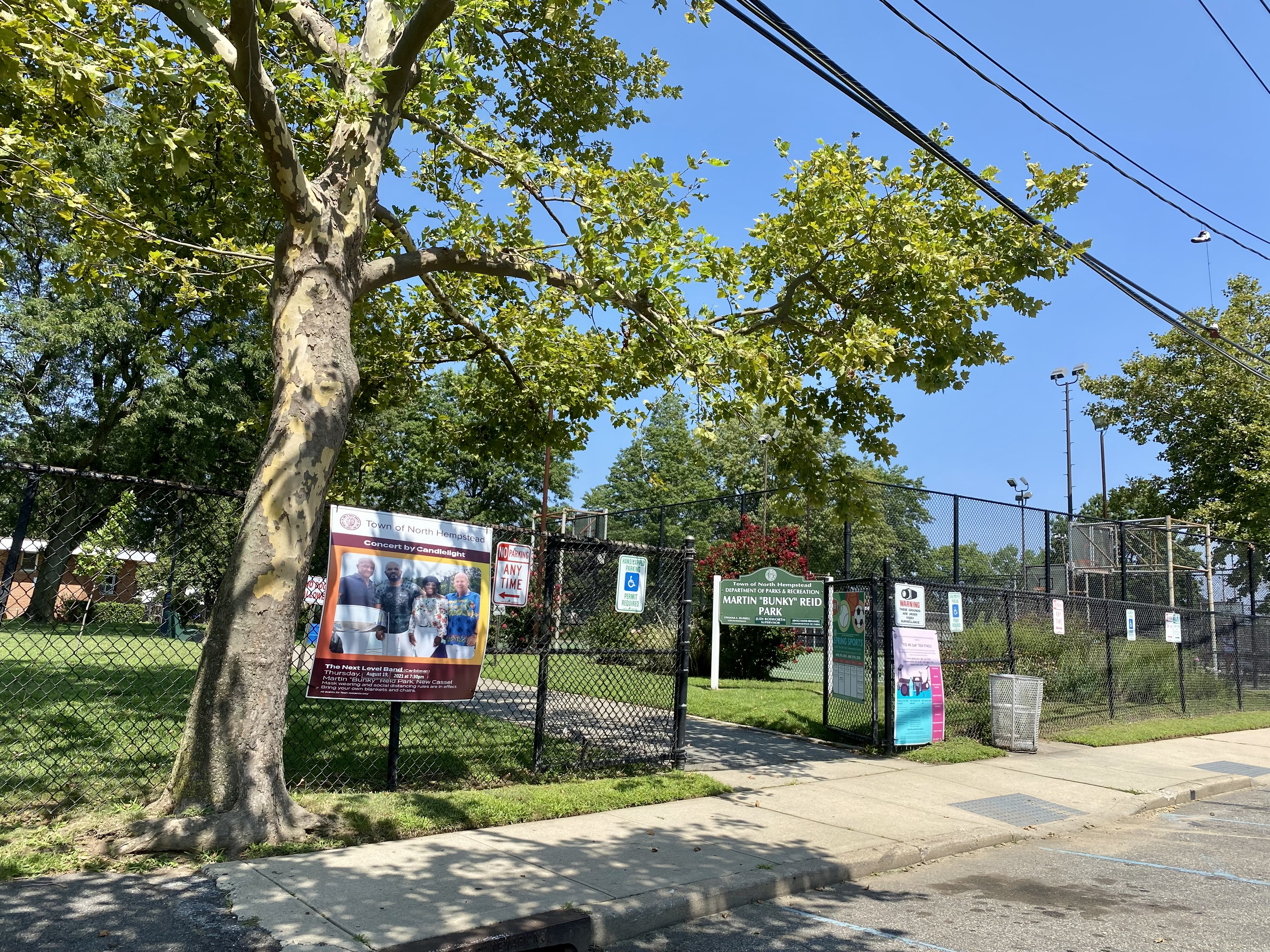
- An entrance to Martin "Bunky" Reid Park in August 2021
- Interactive map of Martin "Bunky" Reid Park
- Type: Public
- Location: New Cassel, New York, United States
- Coordinates: 40°45′32″N 73°33′55″W
- Owner: Town of North Hempstead
- Website: Town of North Hempstead – Martin "Bunky" Reid Park

Martin "Bunky" Reid Park (also known as Martin Reid Town Park and historically as New Cassel Park) is a park in New Cassel, in Nassau County, on Long Island, in New York, United States. It is located within and operated by the Town of North Hempstead.

== Description ==
The park is located in New Cassel, New York, and is named for Martin "Bunky" Reid (1951-1993), a prominent local who died of colon cancer. It features basketball courts, a pool, shuffleboard courts, horseshoe pits, a playground, picnic areas, and various sports fields.

In 2018, the Town of North Hempstead applied for a $30,000 grant in order to modernize the playground at the park.

During the 20th century, the park was the location of performances by Aretha Franklin, The Jackson 5, and other musicians.

== See also ==
- "Yes We Can" Community Center – A North Hempstead community center located near the park.
