= Matt Seelinger =

American baseball player (born 1995)

Free agent
- Pitcher
- Born: April 19, 1995 (age 31); Westbury, New York, U.S.
- Bats: Right Throws: Right

MLB debut
- July 7, 2026, for the New York Mets

MLB statistics (through 2026 season)
- Win–loss record: 0–1
- Earned run average: 31.50
- Strikeouts: 2
- Stats at Baseball Reference

Teams
- New York Mets (2026)

Matthew Thomas Seelinger (born April 19, 1995) is an American professional baseball pitcher who is a free agent. He has previously played in Major League Baseball (MLB) for the New York Mets. He debuted in MLB in 2026.

== Career ==
Seelinger attended W. T. Clarke High School in Salisbury, New York, and Farmingdale State College, where he played college baseball for the Farmingdale State Rams. The Pittsburgh Pirates selected Seelinger in the 28th round of the 2017 MLB draft, making him the first player from Farmingdale State to be selected in the MLB draft.

The Pittsburgh Pirates traded Seelinger to the Tampa Bay Rays for Adeiny Hechavarria and cash considerations on August 6, 2018. On May 20, 2019, the Rays sent Seelinger to the San Francisco Giants as the player to be named later in an earlier trade for Erik Kratz. After the 2021 season, the Philadelphia Phillies selected Seelinger from the Giants in the minor league phase of the Rule 5 draft.

In 2024, the Detroit Tigers purchased Seelinger's contract from the Long Island Ducks. They re-signed him to a minor league contract after the 2025 season. The Tigers invited him to spring training as a non-roster player in 2026.

On July 6, 2026, the Tigers traded Seelinger to the New York Mets in exchange for cash considerations. The following day, he was selected to the 40–man roster and promoted to the major leagues for the first time. Seelinger made his MLB debut that night against the Kansas City Royals, allowing seven runs on five hits across two innings pitched. He was designated for assignment by the Mets the following day. Seelinger cleared waivers and was sent outright to the Triple-A Syracuse Mets on July 11. He elected free agency on November 2.

== See also ==
- Rule 5 draft results
