= East Meadow High School =

High school in Nassau County, New York, United States

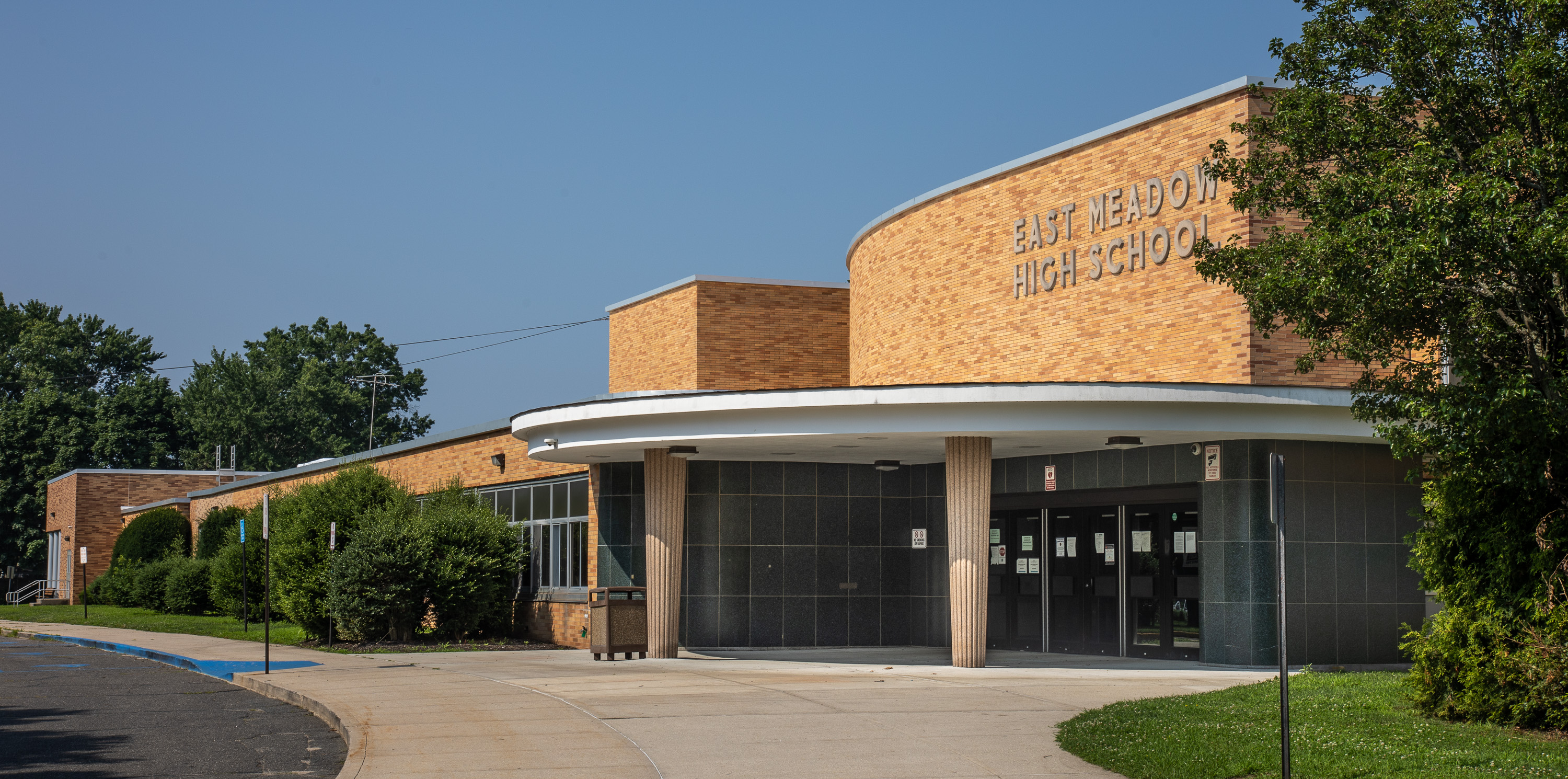

Location
- 101 Carman Avenue; East Meadow, (Nassau County), New York 11554; United States; 40°43′45″N 73°33′24″W

Information
- Type: Public high school
- Founded: 1953
- School district: East Meadow School District
- NCES School ID: 360984000756
- Principal: Richard Howard
- Faculty: 122.35 FTEs
- Grades: 9−12
- Enrollment: 1,517 (as of 2023–2024)
- Student to teacher ratio: 12.40
- Colors: Royal Blue and gold
- Team name: Jets
- Newspaper: The Jet Gazette
- Yearbook: Resume
- Website: Official website

East Meadow High School is a public high school in East Meadow, New York. It is one of two high schools, along with W. T. Clarke High School, in the East Meadow Union Free School District. The school was founded in 1953 and serves students in grades 9−12. As of the 2023–24 school year, the school enrolled 1517 students.

== Athletics ==
East Meadow offers sports programs in three seasons.

=== Fall sports ===
Football (2006 & 2011 Nassau County champions), soccer, field hockey (2008 County champions), cross country, girls' tennis, boys' golf, volleyball, cheerleading, Rockettes/kickline, girls' swimming and diving.

The girls' cross country team had a league meet winning streak from October 2000 through October 2009, with a record during this time of approximately 120–0.

=== Winter sports ===
Wrestling (1970, 1990, 1994, 2000, & 2007 Nassau County Champions), girls' basketball, bowling, winter track.

=== Spring sports ===
Baseball (1997 State champions), lacrosse, softball, track and field (2009 Boys' Class A Division I champions), girls' badminton, boys' tennis.

== Notable alumni ==
- Joel David Rifkin (born 1959), New Jersey's most prolific serial killer.
- Criss Angel (born 1967), magician/illusionist
- Adam Busch (born 1978), actor/singer
- John Danowski (born 1954), college lacrosse coach
- Gregg Gonsalves (born 1963), epidemiologist and health activist
- Richard Greenberg (1958–2025, class of 1976), Broadway playwright and television writer
- Jordan Katz (born 1977), Musician
- Gary Kreps (born 1952), health and risk communication scholar
- David Wong Louie (1954–2018, class of 1973), novelist and short story writer
- Annet Mahendru (born 1985, class of 2004), actress
- Stephanie Pace Marshall (born 1945), educator and the founding president of the Illinois Mathematics and Science Academy
- John Mauceri (born 1945), conductor
- Rich Mauti (born 1954), former American football wide receiver
- Brandon Moore (born 1979), NFL linebacker
- Rich Ohrnberger (born 1986), NFL offensive lineman.
- Dave Palumbo (born 1968), bodybuilder
- Joel Rifkin (born 1959), serial killer
- Matt Serra (born 1974), UFC fighter and former UFC Welterweight Champion
- Marc Siegel (born 1956), physician and author
- Frank Viola (born 1960), former Major League Baseball pitcher.
- Sandro Vitiello (born 1958), former American football placekicker
