= New Cassel, New York =

- Hamlet and census-designated place
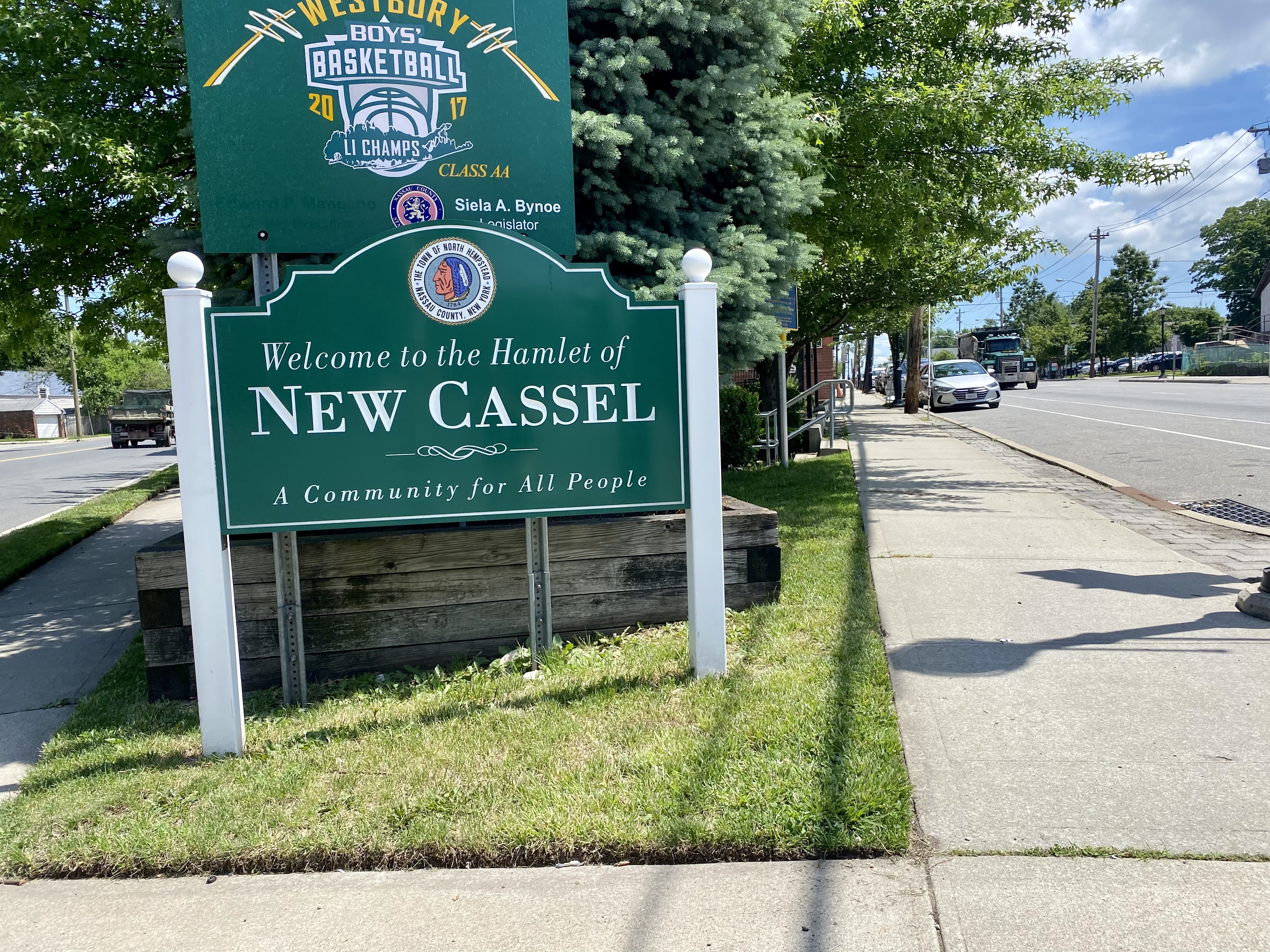
- A New Cassel entrance sign at Prospect Avenue and Brush Hollow Road in 2021
- Motto: "A Community for All People"
- Location in Nassau County and the state of New York

- Location on Long Island Location within the state of New York
- Coordinates: 40°45′38″N 73°34′0″W
- Country: United States
- State: New York
- County: Nassau
- Town: North Hempstead

Area
  - Total: 1.49 sq mi (3.87 km^{2})
  - Land: 1.49 sq mi (3.87 km^{2})
  - Water: 0 sq mi (0.00 km^{2})
- Elevation: 121 ft (37 m)

Population (2020)
  - Total: 14,199
  - Density: 9,508.4/sq mi (3,671.21/km^{2})
- Time zone: UTC-5 (Eastern (EST))
  - Summer (DST): UTC-4 (EDT)
- ZIP Code: 11590 (Westbury)
- Area codes: 516, 363
- FIPS code: 36-50067
- GNIS feature ID: 0958399

New Cassel is a hamlet and census-designated place (CDP) in the Town of North Hempstead in Nassau County, on Long Island, in New York, United States. The population was 14,199 at the time of the 2020 census.

== History ==
New Cassel was one of the first free African American communities on Long Island. It was founded by a group of formerly enslaved African American farmers in the mid 1700s. About the time of the close of the American Revolutionary War, Hessian settlers, mostly from Hesse-Cassel in the Holy Roman Empire and who chose not to return Europe, and settled throughout the area, as well; this gave rise to New Cassel's name, which was chosen in honor of the part of Hesse from which most had come.

When the adjacent village of Westbury incorporated in 1932, New Cassel residents chose not to be included within the new municipality's territory, over fears that their taxes would rise by becoming part of the village. Accordingly, New Cassel would remain an unincorporated hamlet directly governed by the Town of North Hempstead in Manhasset.

After World War II, New Cassel became home to a great number of successful middle class families, including many Black and Latino veterans. By the second half of the 20th century, New Cassel had become home to a growing number of Haitian and Latino families.

== Geography ==
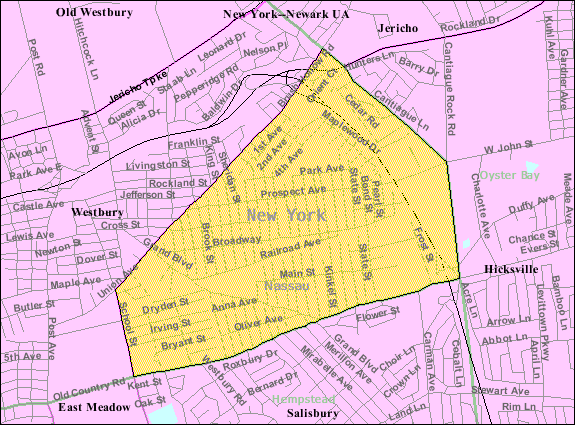
U.S. Census map of New Cassel

According to the United States Census Bureau, the CDP has a total area of 1.5 square miles (3.9 km^{2}), all land.

=== Climate ===
According to the Köppen climate classification, New Cassel has a Humid subtropical climate (type Cfa) with cool, wet winters and hot, humid summers. Precipitation is uniform throughout the year, with slight spring and fall peaks.

== Demographics ==
Historical population
Census	Pop.	Note	%±
2000	13,298		—
2010	14,019		5.4%
2020	14,199		1.3%
U.S. Decennial Census

=== 2020 census ===
As of the 2020 census, New Cassel had a population of 14,199. The median age was 33.5 years. 26.1% of residents were under the age of 18 and 11.5% of residents were 65 years of age or older. For every 100 females there were 99.1 males, and for every 100 females age 18 and over there were 94.9 males age 18 and over.

100.0% of residents lived in urban areas, while 0.0% lived in rural areas.

There were 3,185 households in New Cassel, of which 48.0% had children under the age of 18 living in them. Of all households, 43.5% were married-couple households, 16.0% were households with a male householder and no spouse or partner present, and 34.5% were households with a female householder and no spouse or partner present. About 17.1% of all households were made up of individuals and 9.8% had someone living alone who was 65 years of age or older.

There were 3,402 housing units, of which 6.4% were vacant. The homeowner vacancy rate was 2.3% and the rental vacancy rate was 7.4%.

Racial composition as of the 2020 census
Race	Number	Percent
White	1,305	9.2%
Black or African American	4,995	35.2%
American Indian and Alaska Native	213	1.5%
Asian	425	3.0%
Native Hawaiian and Other Pacific Islander	5	0.0%
Some other race	5,291	37.3%
Two or more races	1,965	13.8%
Hispanic or Latino (of any race)	7,917	55.8%

=== 2010 census ===
As of 2010, the population was 14,019. The demographics were as follows:

- Hispanic - 7,577 (53.9%)
- Black alone - 5,225 (37.2%)
- White alone - 841 (6.0%)
- Two or more races - 187 (1.3%)
- Asian alone - 174 (1.2%)
- Other race alone - 44 (0.3%)
- American Indian alone - 10 (0.07%)
- Native Hawaiian and Other Pacific Islander alone - 1 (0.01%)

=== 2000 census ===
As of the census of 2000, there were 13,298 people, 2,972 households, and 2,448 families residing in the CDP. The population density was 9,072.8 inhabitants per square mile (3,503.0/km^{2}). There were 3,067 housing units at an average density of 2,092.5 per square mile (807.9/km^{2}). The racial makeup of the CDP was 31.64% White, 47.32% African American, 0.45% Native American, 1.41% Asian, 0.05% Pacific Islander, 12.59% from other races, and 6.55% from two or more races. Hispanic or Latino of any race were 41.11% of the population.

There were 2,972 households, out of which 40.6% had children under the age of 18 living with them, 50.2% were married couples living together, 22.9% had a female householder with no husband present, and 17.6% were non-families. 12.7% of all households were made up of individuals, and 7.0% had someone living alone who was 65 years of age or older. The average household size was 4.46 and the average family size was 4.40.

In the CDP, the population was spread out, with 28.9% under the age of 18, 12.3% from 18 to 24, 32.7% from 25 to 44, 17.6% from 45 to 64, and 8.5% who were 65 years of age or older. The median age was 30 years. For every 100 females, there were 99.0 males. For every 100 females age 18 and over, there were 98.1 males.

The median income for a household in the CDP was $71,270, and the median income for a family was $69,044. Males had a median income of $22,526 versus $28,193 for females. The per capita income for the CDP was $15,673. About 10.5% of families and 14.8% of the population were below the poverty line, including 19.5% of those under age 18 and 13.7% of those age 65 or over.

== Parks and recreation ==
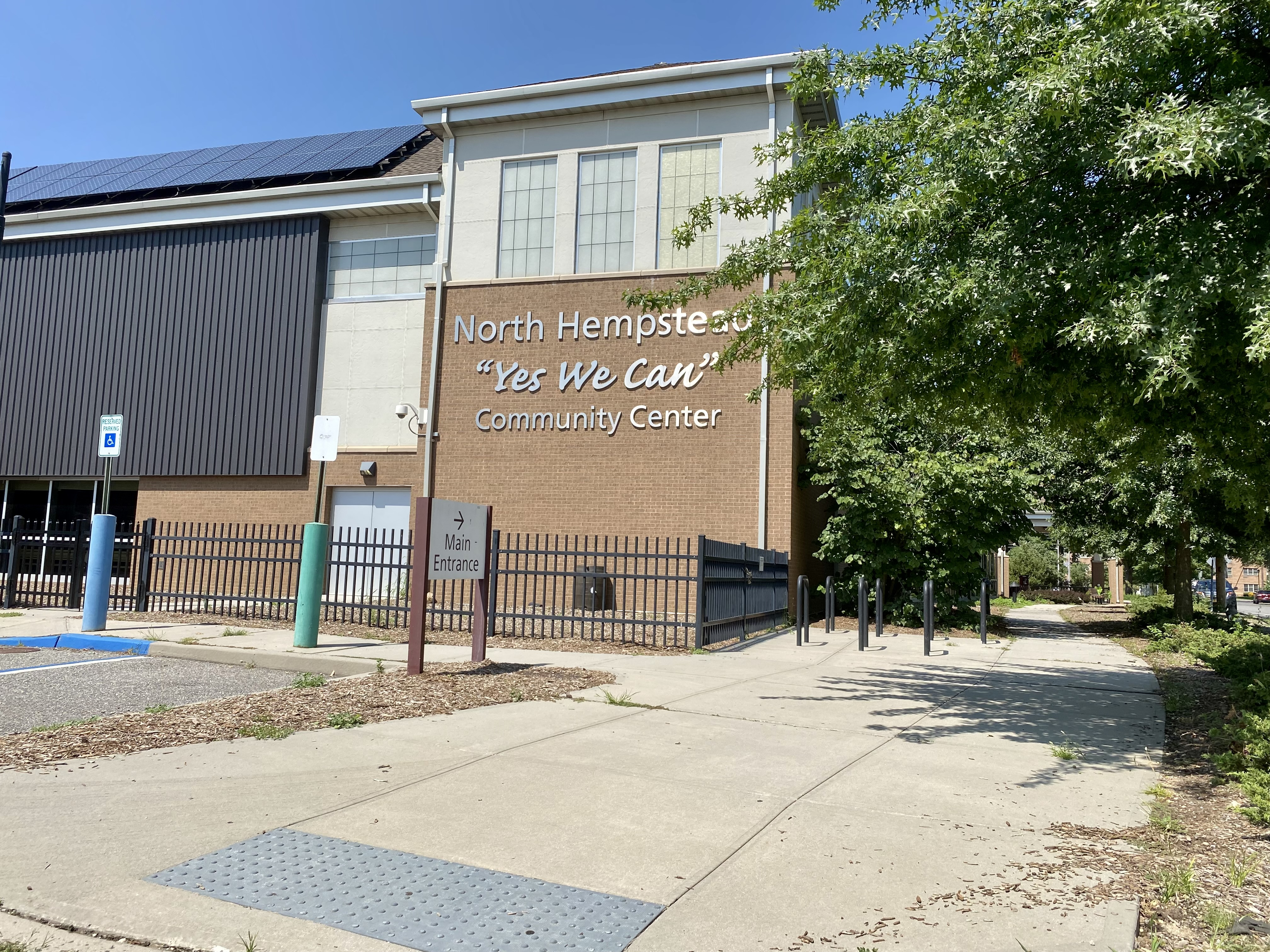
The "Yes We Can" Community Center in 2021

The Town of North Hempstead operates two parks and recreational facilities in New Cassel:

- Martin "Bunky" Reid Park
- "Yes We Can" Community Center

== Education ==
=== Schools ===
New Cassel is located entirely within the boundaries of (and is thus served by) the Westbury Union Free School District. Accordingly, all children who reside within the CDP and attend public schools go to Westbury's schools.

=== Library ===
New Cassel is located entirely within the boundaries of the Westbury Library District, which is served by the Westbury Memorial Public Library, located in the Village of Westbury.

== Infrastructure ==
=== Transportation ===
==== Road ====
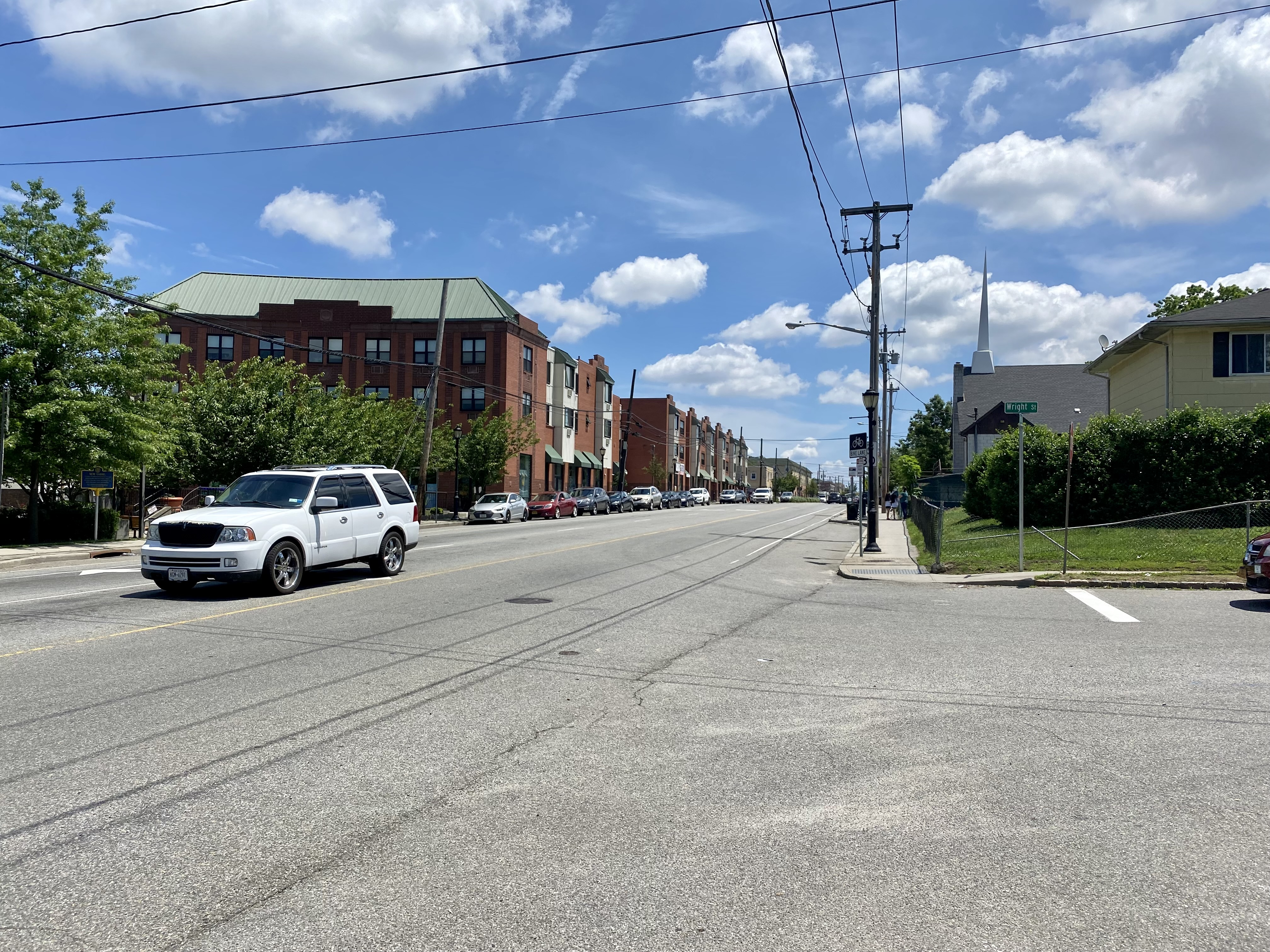
Prospect Avenue in New Cassel in 2021

Two state-maintained highways run through New Cassel: the Northern State Parkway and the Wantagh State Parkway.

Other major roads which travel through the hamlet include Brush Hollow Road, Grand Boulevard, Old Country Road, Prospect Avenue, and Urban Avenue.

==== Rail ====
Although the Long Island Rail Road's Main Line bisects New Cassel, there is no station located within it – although a station existed briefly during the 19th century. Additionally, the western portion of the community is within walking distance of the Westbury station.

==== Bus ====
The northern portion of New Cassel is served by the n22 and n22X bus routes along Prospect Avenue, while the southern portion is served by the n24 along Old Country Road. All of those routes are operated by Nassau Inter-County Express (NICE) and travel between the Hicksville LIRR station and Jamaica, Queens.

=== Utilities ===
==== Natural gas ====
National Grid USA provides natural gas to all properties that are hooked up to natural gas lines in New Cassel.

==== Power ====
PSEG Long Island provides power to all homes and businesses within New Cassel, on behalf of the Long Island Power Authority.

==== Sewage ====
New Cassel, in its entirety, is connected to the Nassau County Sewage District's sanitary sewer network.

==== Water ====
New Cassel located entirely within the boundaries of the Westbury Water District.

== See also ==
- List of Census-designated places in New York
- Salisbury, Nassau County, New York
