= Ray Busse =

American baseball player (born 1948)

- Shortstop
- Born: September 25, 1948 (age 77); Daytona Beach, Florida, U.S.
- Batted: Right Threw: Right

MLB debut
- July 24, 1971, for the Houston Astros

Last MLB appearance
- October 2, 1974, for the Houston Astros

MLB statistics
- Batting average: .148
- Home runs: 2
- Runs batted in: 9
- Stats at Baseball Reference

Teams
- Houston Astros (1971, 1973–1974); St. Louis Cardinals (1973)

Raymond Edward Busse (born September 25, 1948) is an American former Major League Baseball shortstop who played for the Houston Astros and St. Louis Cardinals in all or parts of three seasons spanning 1971–1974. He was traded along with Bobby Fenwick by the Astros to the Cardinals for Skip Jutze and Milt Ramírez on November 29, 1972.

Ray attended Mainland High School in Daytona Beach, Florida. He then attended Daytona Beach Community College and was signed as an undrafted free agent by the Houston Astros in 1967.
