= Sandro Vitiello =

Italian gridiron football player (born 1958)

No. 11, 6
- Position: Placekicker

Personal information
- Born: February 21, 1958 (age 68); Broccostella, Italy
- Listed height: 6 ft 2 in (1.88 m)
- Listed weight: 197 lb (89 kg)

Career information
- High school: East Meadow (East Meadow, New York, U.S.)
- College: UMass
- NFL draft: 1980: 10th round, 252nd overall pick

Career history
- Cincinnati Bengals (1980); Washington Redskins (1981)*; Baltimore Colts (1982)*; Washington Federals (1983–1984)
- * Offseason or practice squad member only

Career NFL statistics
- Field goal attempts: 2
- Field goals made: 0
- Field goal %: 0.00
- Extra points attempted: 1
- Extra points made: 1
- Stats at Pro Football Reference

Sandro B. Vitiello (born February 21, 1958) is an Italian former American football placekicker who played one season for the Cincinnati Bengals of the National Football League (NFL). He also played two seasons with the Washington Federals of the United States Football League (USFL).

Vitiello was born on February 21, 1958, in Broccostella, Italy. His family moved to Long Island, New York, when he was 7. He went to East Meadow High School and played soccer there. When he went to college he became a placekicker. He went to college at UMass. He was left–footed but could also kick field goals with his right foot. He was drafted in the 10th round (252nd overall) by the Cincinnati Bengals in the 1980 NFL draft. Vitiello played two games with the Bengals his rookie season, and was signed and released twice by the team. In his two games he made two field goal attempts, and an extra point. The next season he signed with the Washington Redskins but did not make any appearances. Two years later he signed with the Washington Federals of the USFL. In his first season with the Federals, he played in eight games, and made 10 of 17 field goal attempts. He also played in two games the next season, going 0 for 4 on field goals but 2 for 3 on extra points. 1984 was his last season of professional football.
