= W. T. Clarke High School =

W.T. Clarke High School

Location
- 740 Edgewood Dr; New York, New York 11590; United States; 40°44′51″N 73°33′53″W

Information
- Type: Public
- School district: East Meadow Union Free School District
- Superintendent: Kenneth Rosner
- NCES School ID: 360984000761
- Principal: Timothy Voels
- Teaching staff: 81.46 (on an FTE basis)
- Grades: 9-12
- Enrollment: 892 (2023-2024)
- Student to teacher ratio: 10.95
- Campus: Suburban: Large
- Colors: Maroon and Gray
- Mascot: Rams
- Newspaper: The Vanguard
- Yearbook: Scope
- Website: www.emufsd.us/o/wtchs

W. T. Clarke High School is a high school in Salisbury, in Nassau County, New York, United States. It is operated by the East Meadow Union Free School District (also known as the East Meadow School District). The school serves students living in Salisbury, East Meadow, and Levittown, New York. This school was named after Walter Tresper Clarke, who was a former president of the East Meadow School Board.

As of the 2023–2024 school year, the school had an enrollment of 892 students and 81.46 classroom teachers (on an FTE basis), for a student–teacher ratio of 10.95:1. There were 230 students (25.8% of enrollment) eligible for free lunch and 15 (1.7% of students) eligible for reduced-cost lunch.

== History ==
The Walter Tresper Clarke High School first opened in 1957 and was designed by Valley Stream, New York-based Frederic P. Wiedersum Associates. The class of 1959 was the first graduating class, while the class of 1961 was the first graduating class to have spent all four years of high school at Clarke.

The media spotlight was on the school in 1967 when Pete Seeger came to W. T. Clarke High School on March 8, 1967, to sing to an enthusiastic crowd of 1,100 inside the building, and 300 flag-waving protesters outside. The concert was a year late, but it was a victory against censorship. "Mr. Seeger is a highly controversial figure, and as such, injecting him into our community in East Meadow we thought would stir passions, create discord, [and] disharmony ...," the school board said in December 1965, when it canceled a scheduled Seeger appearance. The main question of controversy, the board said, was that on an earlier trip to the Soviet Union, Seeger had sung songs opposing the Vietnam War.

Getting Seeger into the high school auditorium took court battles that went all the way to the New York Court of Appeals, the state's highest court said that canceling an earlier invitation because of Seeger's controversial views violated both the state and federal Constitutions.

The Nassau chapter of the New York Civil Liberties Union filed an amicus brief to the Court of Appeals, playing a key role in the legal battle.

The high school was again brought into the media spotlight in January 2007 when the school's principal barred a deaf student, John Cave, from bringing a service dog to school. The principal, Timothy Voels, stated that his decision was motivated by concerns over student welfare, such as allergies.

The student's parents responded in early February 2007 by filing a $150-million discrimination lawsuit against the East Meadow School District, claiming that school officials subjected the student to "bias, bigotry and prejudice."

The school was again the subject of media attention in 2025 following the guilty plea of former music teacher Michael Fazio, who pleaded guilty in federal court to possession of child pornography after investigators found hundreds of illicit images stored on his Dropbox account and personal cellphones, including images and videos of some East Meadow students that he had secretly recorded.

== Notable alumni ==
- Karl "Bud" Anderson (Class of 1974) — former professional Major League Baseball pitcher
- Barry W. Blaustein (Class of 1972) — television and movie comedy writer
- Jay C. Buckey (Class of 1973) — physician and astronaut
- Chuck D (Class of 1978) — rapper, author, producer, and leader of the rap group Public Enemy
- Dan Frisa (Class of 1973) — former Republican U.S. Congressman
- Ellen Greene (Class of 1969) — actress and singer
- Skip Jutze (Class of 1964) — MLB player (catcher) with the St. Louis Cardinals, Houston Astros, and Seattle Mariners
- Samir Khan (Class of 2003) — self-proclaimed "Media Jihadist," killed in U.S. drone strike in Yemen
- Ron Klimkowski (Class of 1962) — MLB player for the New York Yankees and Oakland Athletics, first Clarke alumnus to play in major league baseball
- Bob Lazar (Class of 1976) — UFO conspiracist
- Abbe Lowell (Class of 1970) — chief minority counsel in the U.S. House of Representatives during the impeachment of President Bill Clinton
- Dan Middleman (Class of 1987) — long-distance runner, United States Olympic Team for the 1996 Summer Olympics, competing in the men's 10,000 metres
- Eli Rosenbaum (Class of 1972) — U.S. Justice Department official, Nazi-hunter
- Irene Rosenfeld (Class of 1971) — chairman and CEO of Mondelēz International, Inc. (formerly Kraft Foods)
- Matt Seelinger (Class of 2013) - baseball player
