= Skip Jutze =

American baseball player (born 1946)

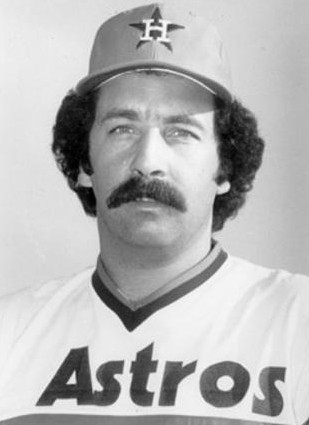
- Jutze in 1976
- Catcher
- Born: May 28, 1946 (age 78); Bayside, New York, U.S.
- Batted: Right Threw: Right

MLB debut
- September 1, 1972, for the St. Louis Cardinals

Last MLB appearance
- September 21, 1977, for the Seattle Mariners

MLB statistics
- Batting average: .215
- Home runs: 3
- Runs batted in: 51
- Stats at Baseball Reference

Teams
- St. Louis Cardinals (1972); Houston Astros (1973–1976); Seattle Mariners (1977)

Alfred Henry "Skip" Jutze (born May 28, 1946) is an American former professional baseball player. He played all or part of six seasons in Major League Baseball, primarily as a catcher.

== Baseball career ==
Jutze attended W. Tresper Clarke High School in Westbury, New York, and was drafted out of Central Connecticut State University by the St. Louis Cardinals in the fourth round of the 1968 MLB amateur draft. Prior to his major league debut, Jutze taught at Candlewood Junior High School, in Dix Hills, New York.

Jutze made his Major League Baseball debut with the Cardinals on September 1, 1972, and appeared in his final game on September 21, 1977. He was traded, along with Milt Ramírez, by the Cardinals to the Astros for Ray Busse and Bobby Fenwick on November 29, 1972.

Jutze was a member of the inaugural Seattle Mariners team that began play in 1977. He also holds the distinction of having hit the first grand slam home run in Mariners' history on May 17 of that year.

== Vitamins ==
On May 17, 1977, in the Kingdome, Jutze hit a grand slam, which was his second home run in the big leagues and the Seattle Mariners' first Grand Slam as a team. Skip later disclosed that he had other help than human agency. On the advice of a cafeteria cashier whose constant humming and whistling impressed him, had begun taking B-Complex vitamins as she advised. He described it: "I've always been relaxed behind the plate. But at bat, I suffered from tension, tried too hard. Ever since I've taken those vitamins, though, I'm relaxed at the plate, too. My hitting has improved.".

Frank MacCormack, after struggling with his control and being demoted to AAA and then to AA, was sent to Oakland for discussions with Dr. Bruce Ogilvie, noted psychologist, in the hope that the psychotherapy might resurrect the strong-armed pitcher. It didn't produce any quick results, so Jutze talked to MacCormack about those vitamins.

== Personal life ==
Jutze is Jewish, a convert to Judaism.

== Sources ==
- Career statistics from Baseball Reference, or Baseball Reference (Minors)
