= Bobby Fenwick =

American baseball player (born 1946)

- Infielder
- Born: December 10, 1946 (age 79); Naha, USMGR
- Batted: Right Threw: Right

MLB debut
- April 26, 1972, for the Houston Astros

Last MLB appearance
- May 8, 1973, for the St. Louis Cardinals

MLB statistics
- Batting average: .179
- Home runs: 0
- Runs batted in: 5
- Stats at Baseball Reference

Teams
- Houston Astros (1972); St. Louis Cardinals (1973)

Robert Richard Fenwick (December 10, 1946) is a former Major League Baseball player who played infield from 1972 to 1973.

== Early life ==
Fenwick is notable for being the first MLB position player born in Japan, being born in Naha, Okinawa during the American occupation following WW2 (when it was the United States Civil Administration of the Ryukyu Islands).

He attended Anoka High School in Minnesota then went on to play in college for University of Minnesota.

== Baseball career ==
Fenwick was the 16th pick in the 1st round of the 1967 June Baseball Draft by the San Francisco Giants. He played for the Houston Astros and St. Louis Cardinals. He was traded along with Ray Busse by the Astros to the Cardinals for Skip Jutze and Milt Ramírez on November 29, 1972.
