= Westbury Union Free School District =

School district in Nassau County, New York, United States

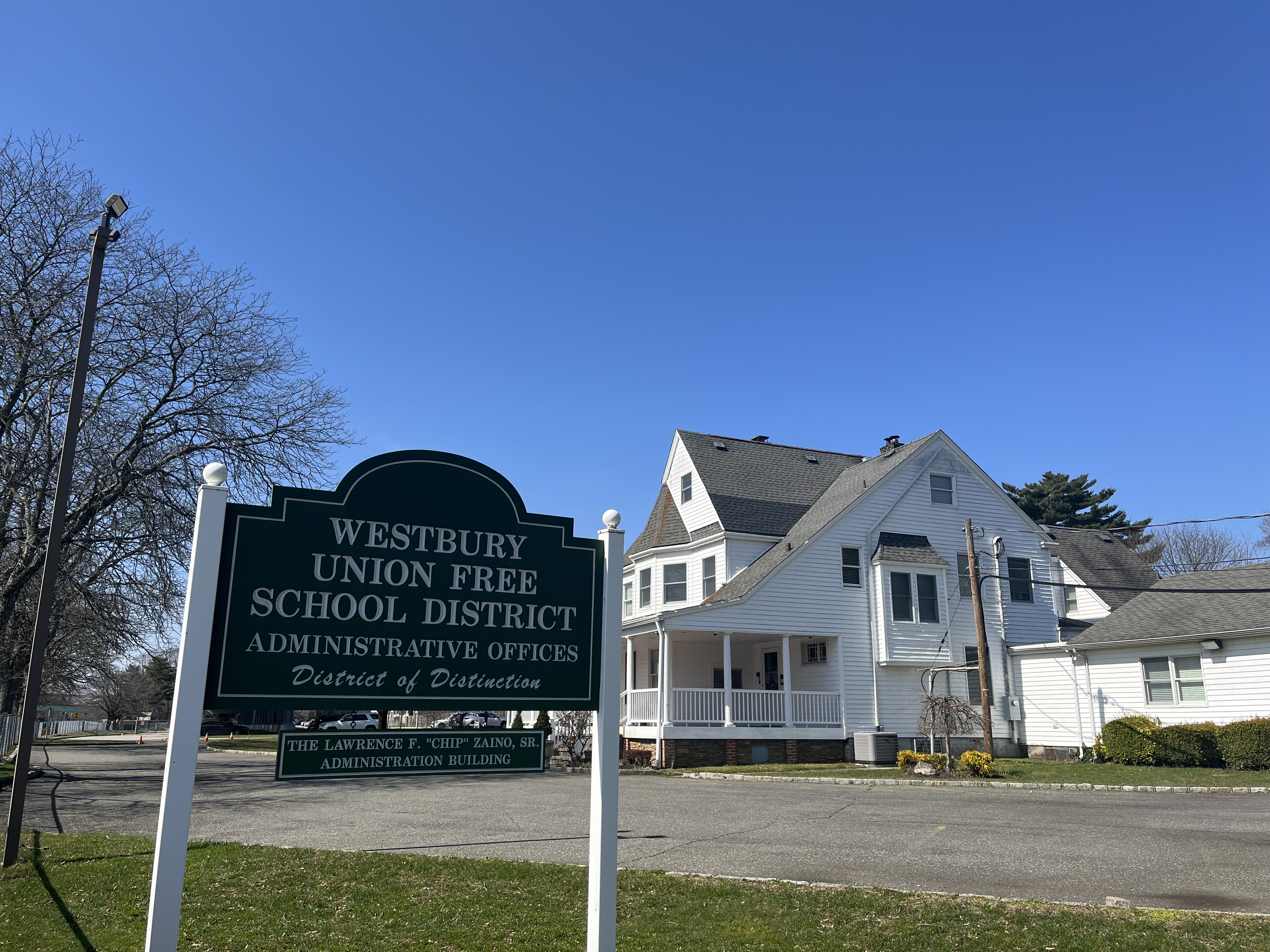

Address
- 2 Hitchcock Lane Old Westbury, New York, 11568-1615; United States

District information
- Type: Public
- Grades: PK-12
- Superintendent: Dr. Tahira A. DuPree Chase
- Schools: 6
- NCES District ID: 3630960
- District ID: NY-280401030000

Other information
- Website: https://www.westburyschools.org

The Westbury Union Free School District (also known as Union Free School District No. 1 and simply as the Westbury School District or WUFSD) is a public school district in Nassau County, New York, United States.

== Overview ==
The Westbury School District serves students in pre-K through grade 12. Its boundaries include large portions of the Greater Westbury area, including portions of the villages of Westbury and Old Westbury, as well as the hamlet of New Cassel.

== Schools ==
=== Elementary ===
- Dryden Street Elementary – Serves grades PK- 01. During the 2022–2023 school year, the school had a total of 433 students enrolled. The student to teacher ratio is 20.62.
  Dryden Street Elementary
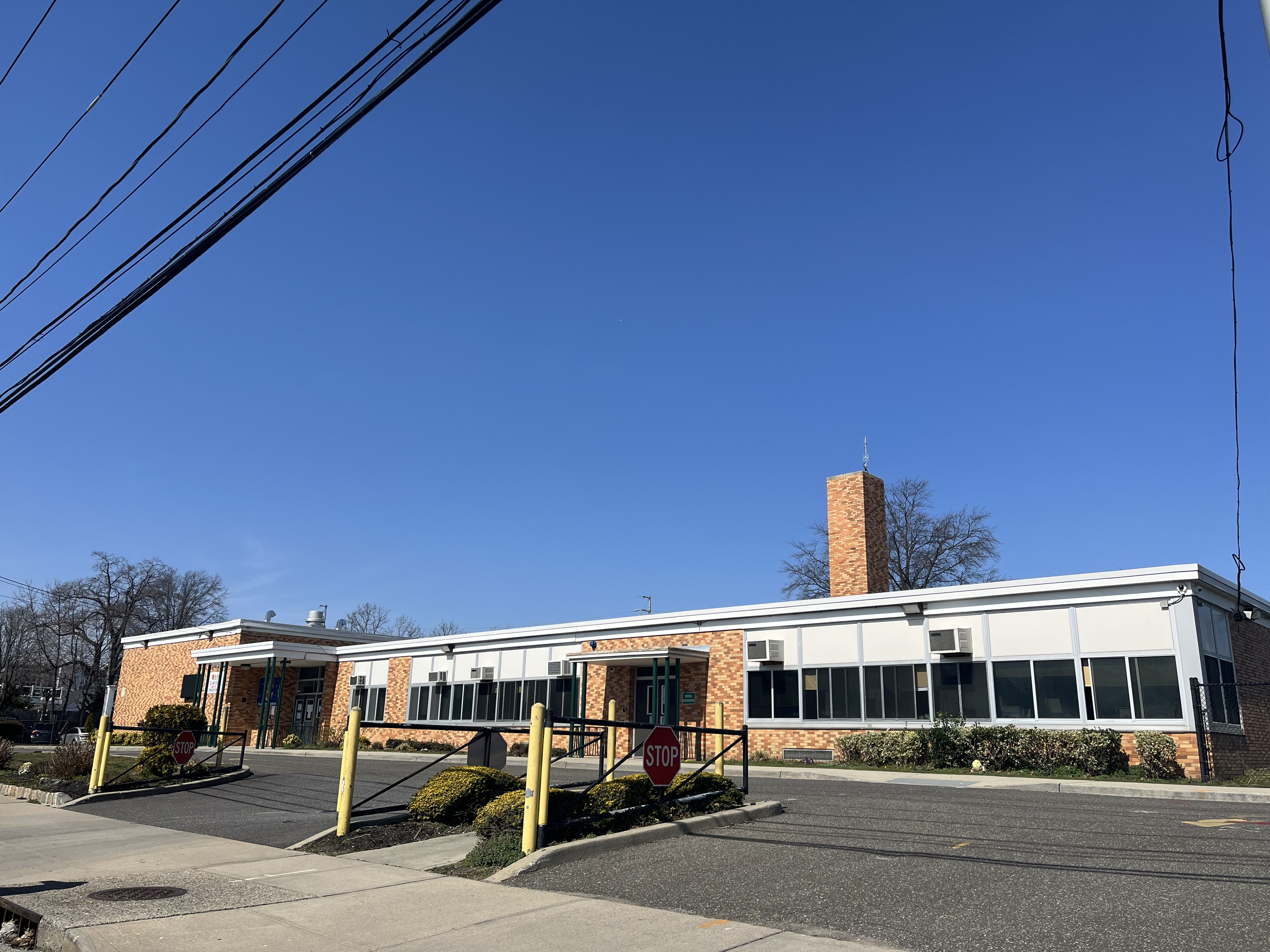
  Location
  - 545 DRYDEN ST; Westbury, New York 11590-4408
  Information
  - NCES School ID: 363096002842
- Drexel Avenue Elementary – Serves grades 1-5. During the 2022-2023 school year, the school had a total of 522 students enrolled. The student to teacher ratio is 14.11.
  Drexel Avenue Elementary
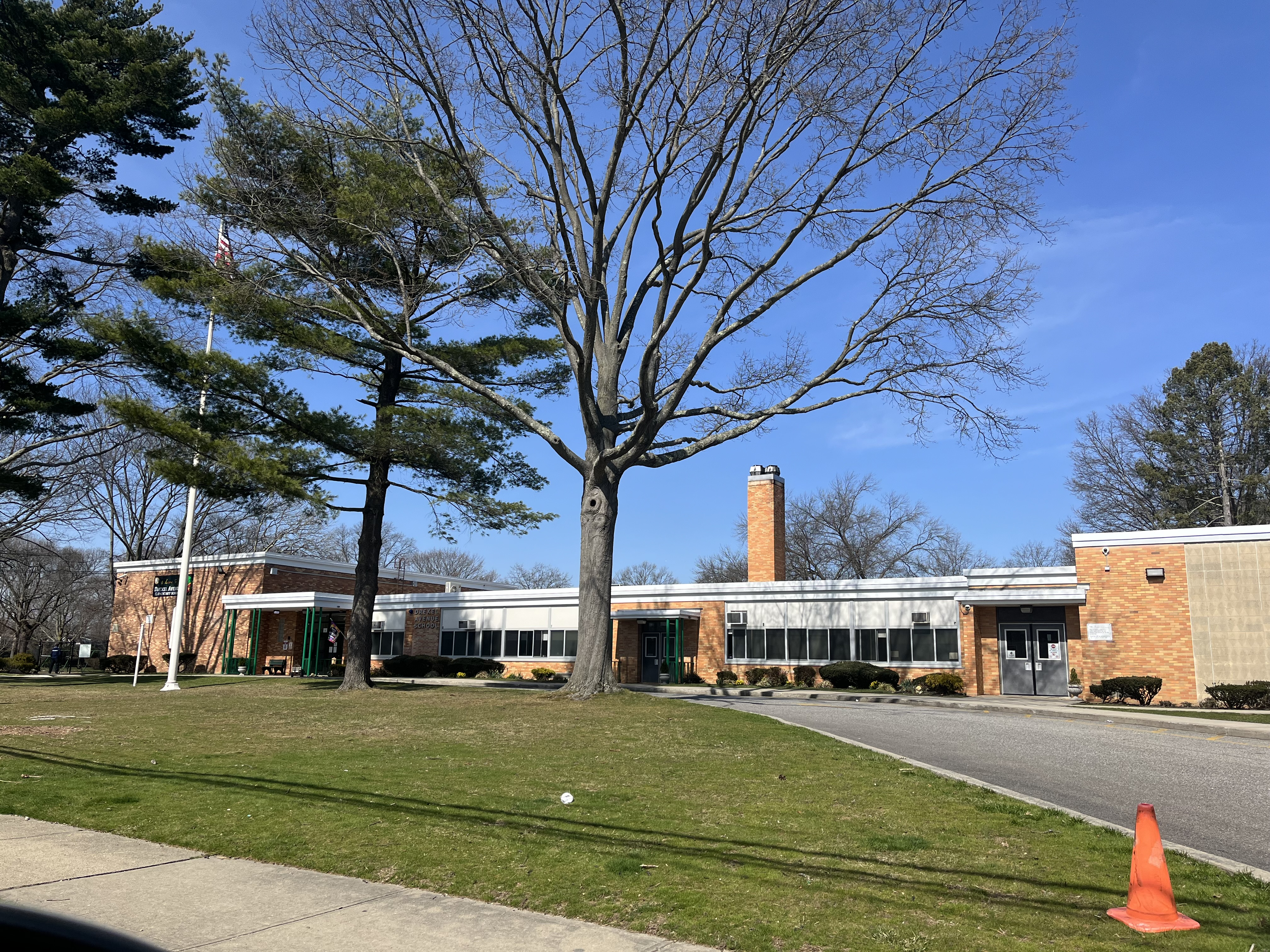
  Location
  - 161 DREXEL AVE; Westbury, New York 11590-3001
  Information
  - NCES School ID: 363096004157
- Park Avenue Elementary – Serves grades 1-5. During the 2022-2023 school year, the school had a total of 566 students enrolled. The student to teacher ratio is 11.39.
  Park Avenue Elementary
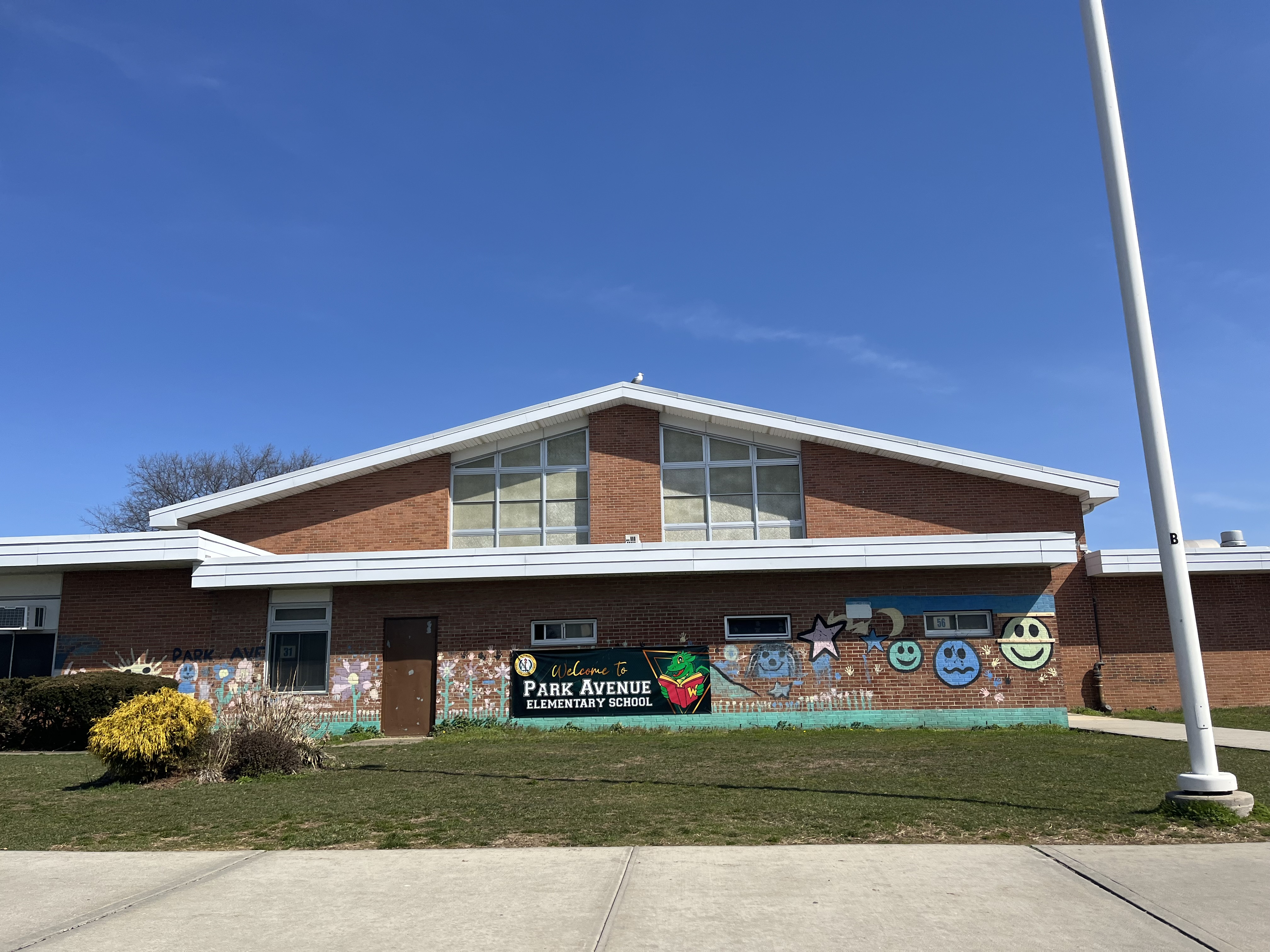
  Location
  - 955 PARK AVE; Westbury, New York 11590-3900
  Information
  - NCES School ID: 363096004159
- Powells Lane Elementary – Serves grades 1-5. During the 2022-2023 school year, the school had a total of 486 students enrolled. The student to teacher ratio is 12.15.

Powells Lane Elementary
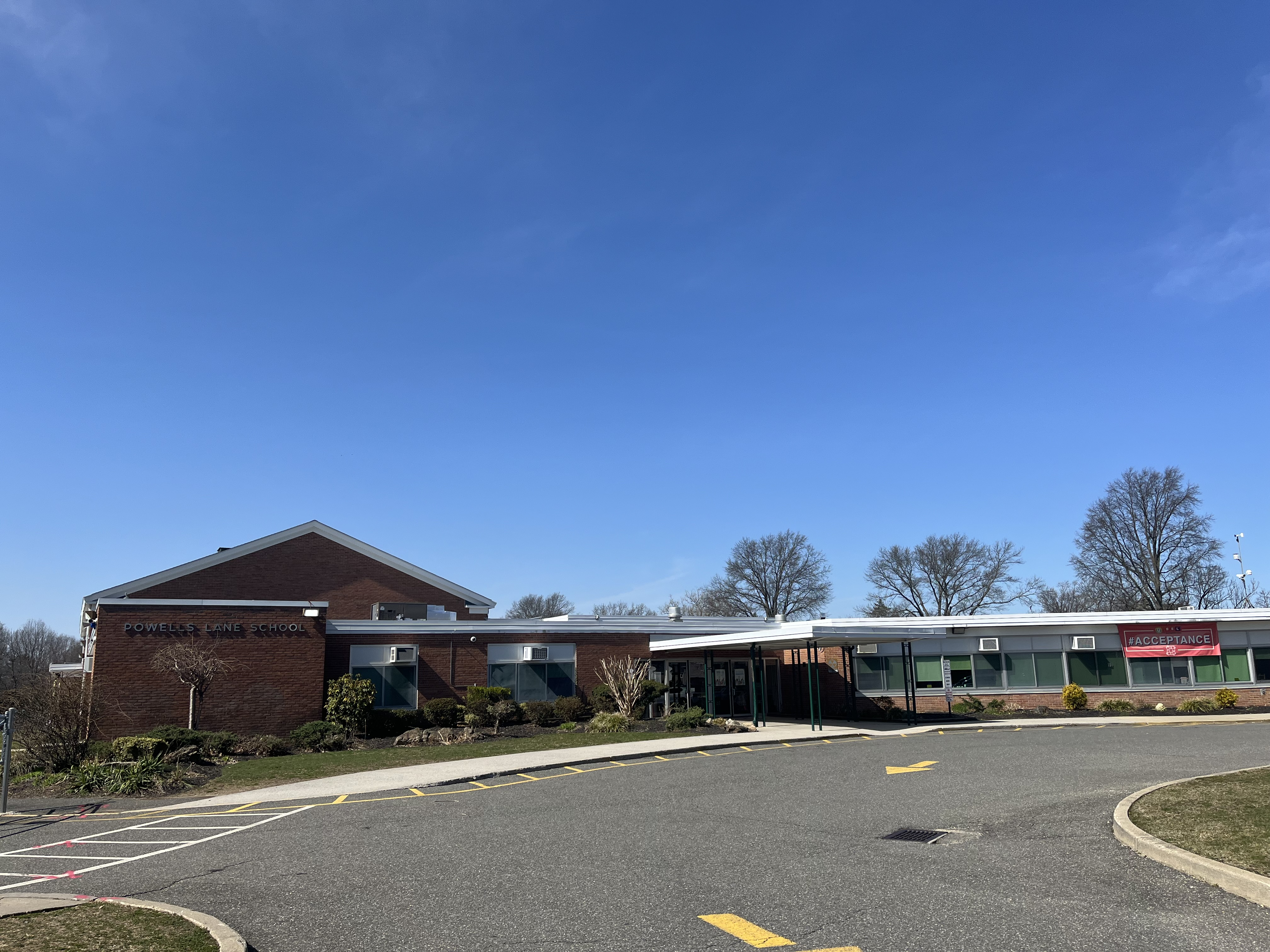

Location
- 603 POWELLS LN; Westbury, New York 11590-1345

Information
- NCES School ID: 363096004160

=== Secondary ===
- Westbury Middle School – Serves grades 6-8. During the 2022-2023 school year, the school had a total of 1,053 students enrolled. The student to teacher ratio is 10.20.
  Westbury Middle School
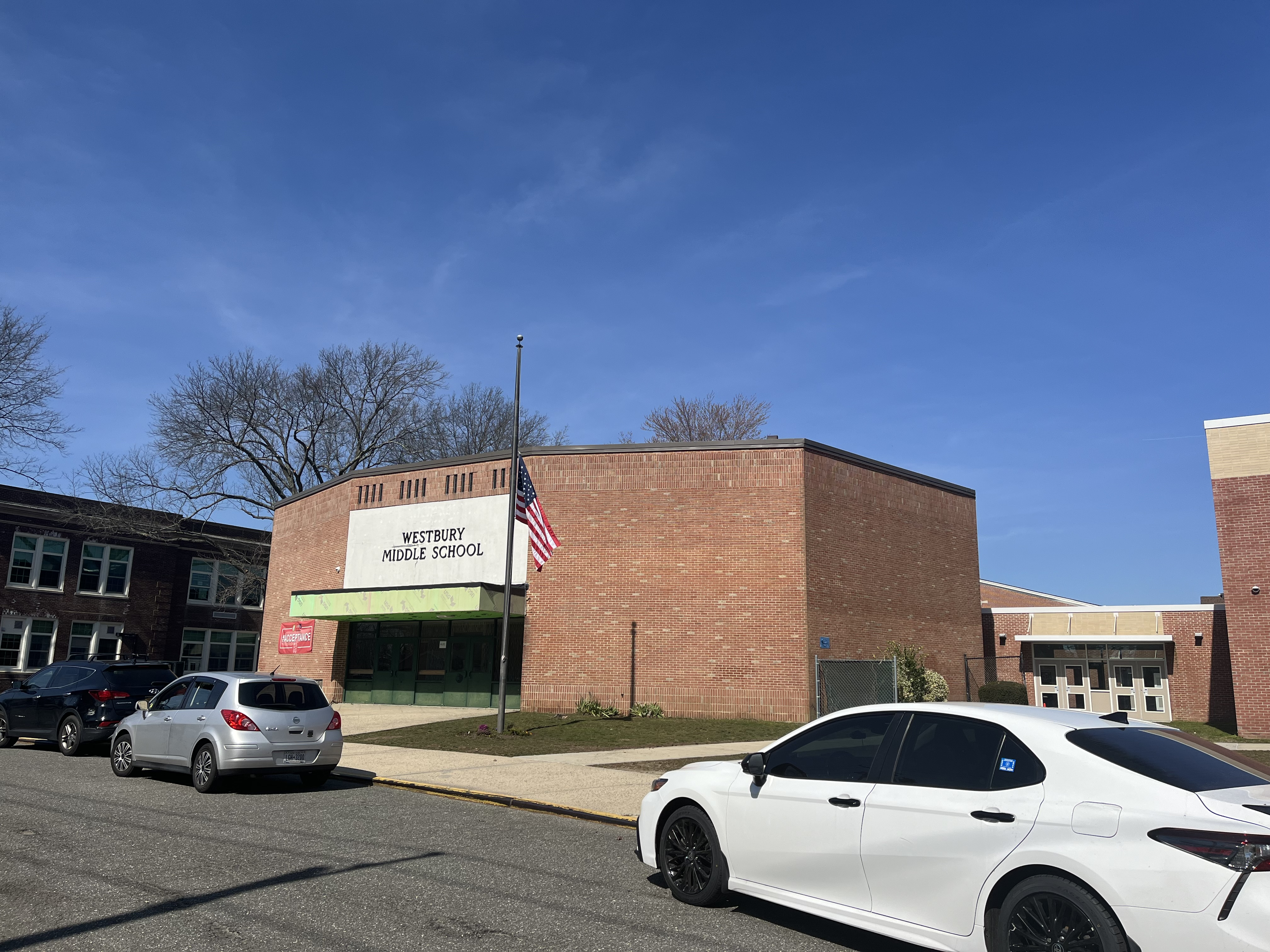
  Location
  - 455 ROCKLAND ST; Westbury, New York 11590-2398
  Information
  - NCES School ID: 363096004161
- Westbury High School – Serves grades 9-12. During the 2022-2023 school year, the school had a total of 1,547 students enrolled. The student to teacher ratio is 13.62

Westbury High School
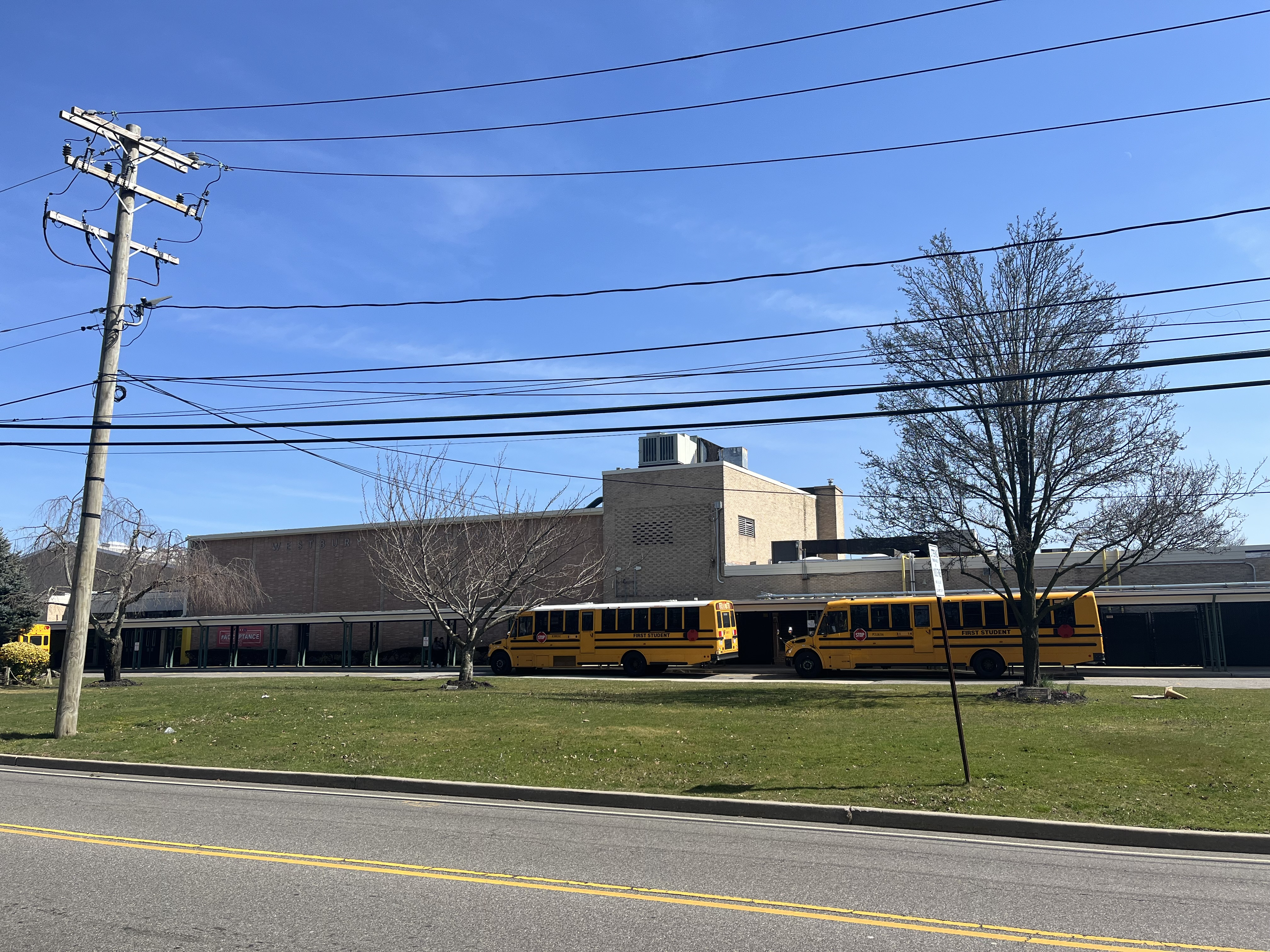

Location
- 1 POST RD; Old Westbury, New York 11568-1623

Information
- NCES School ID: 363096004162

== Staff ==
During the 2022-2023 school year, the total staff (FTE) was 710.71. Of that total, 363.21 staff members were teachers (FTE). Elementary and secondary teachers made up most of that sum, with 173.23 and 169.54 teachers respectively. Additionally, the district staffed 117.00 instructional aids.

== Demographics ==
During the 2022-2023 school year, the district had enrolled a total of 4,768 students.

Enrollment by Gender
Male	2,323	52%
Female	2,124	48%
Non-binary	0	0%

The data above was collected during the 2022-2023 school year.

Enrollment by Ethnicity
Hispanic or Latino	3,358	76%
Black or African American	881	20%
White	138	3%
Asian or Native Hawaiian/Other Pacific Islander	50	1%
American Indian or Alaskan Native	10	0%
Multiracial	10	0%

The data above was collected during the 2022-2023 school year.

== Finances ==
According to fiscal data from 2020-2021, the district's total revenue was $154,587,000. The total revenue amount per student during 2020-2021 was $30,684. During the same year, the district's total expenditures were $164,091,000, and the total expenditure amount per student was $32,571.
