= Gary Kreps =

American communication scholar, professor, author

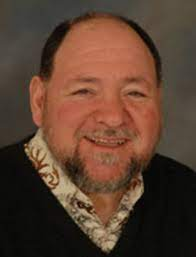
- Born: August 17, 1952 (age 73); Queens, New York, U.S.
- Education: East Meadow High School
- Alma mater: City College of San Francisco; University of Colorado Boulder (BA)(MA)
- Occupations: health and risk communication scholar; professor; author
- Years active: 1978–present

Gary L. Kreps is an American educator. Since 2020, he has been a Distinguished Professor of communication at Virginia's George Mason University, where he directs the Center for Health and Risk Communication. At George Mason University, Kreps served as Chair of the Department of Communication from 2004 to 2013. He, spearheaded introduction of the department's leading international doctoral program in Health, Risk, and Strategic Communication. He held the Eileen and Steve Mandell Endowed Chair in Health Communication from 2004 to 2010, and was appointed as University Distinguished Professor in 2010.

== Awards and honours ==
Kreps has received many distinguished awards and honors for his work. He was elected as a Fellow of the American Academy of Health Behavior in 2010 and as a Fellow of the ICA in 2019. He was elected as an NCA Distinguished Scholar in 2019.

== Education ==
Kreps studied at the University of Colorado Boulder, obtaining a bachelor's degree in Communication in 1975 and a master's degree in Communication the following year. He then studied at the University of Southern California, earning a PhD in Communication in 1979.
