= Milt Ramírez =

Puerto Rican baseball player (1950–2022)

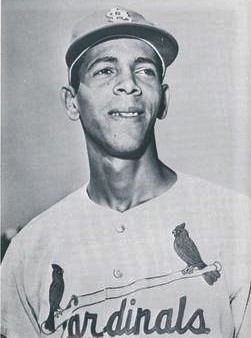
- Shortstop
- Born: April 2, 1950; Mayagüez, Puerto Rico
- Died: August 18, 2022 (aged 72); Mayagüez, Puerto Rico
- Batted: Right Threw: Right

MLB debut
- April 11, 1970, for the St. Louis Cardinals

Last MLB appearance
- August 1, 1979, for the Oakland Athletics

MLB statistics
- Batting average: .184
- Home runs: 0
- Runs batted in: 6
- Stats at Baseball Reference

Teams
- St. Louis Cardinals (1970–1971); Oakland Athletics (1979)

Milton Ramírez Barboza (April 2, 1950 – August 18, 2022) was a Puerto Rican Major League Baseball infielder. He played for the St. Louis Cardinals during the 1970 and 1971 seasons and the Oakland Athletics during the 1979 season.

Ramírez signed with the Baltimore Orioles as an amateur free agent in 1968. The St. Louis Cardinals selected him from the Orioles organization in the Rule 5 draft after the 1969 season. He batted .190 in 87 plate appearances across 62 games played for the Cardinals in the 1970 season. Ramírez appeared in four games for the Cardinals in the 1971 season. The Cardinals traded Ramírez along with Skip Jutze to the Houston Astros for Ray Busse and Bobby Fenwick on November 29, 1972. Ramírez played for the Oakland Athletics in 1979. He batted .161 in 28 games before he was sent to the minor leagues.

Ramírez died on August 18, 2022, at the age of 72.
