= "Yes We Can" Community Center =

Community center in Nassau County, New York, United States

Coordinates: 40°45′31″N 73°34′3″W

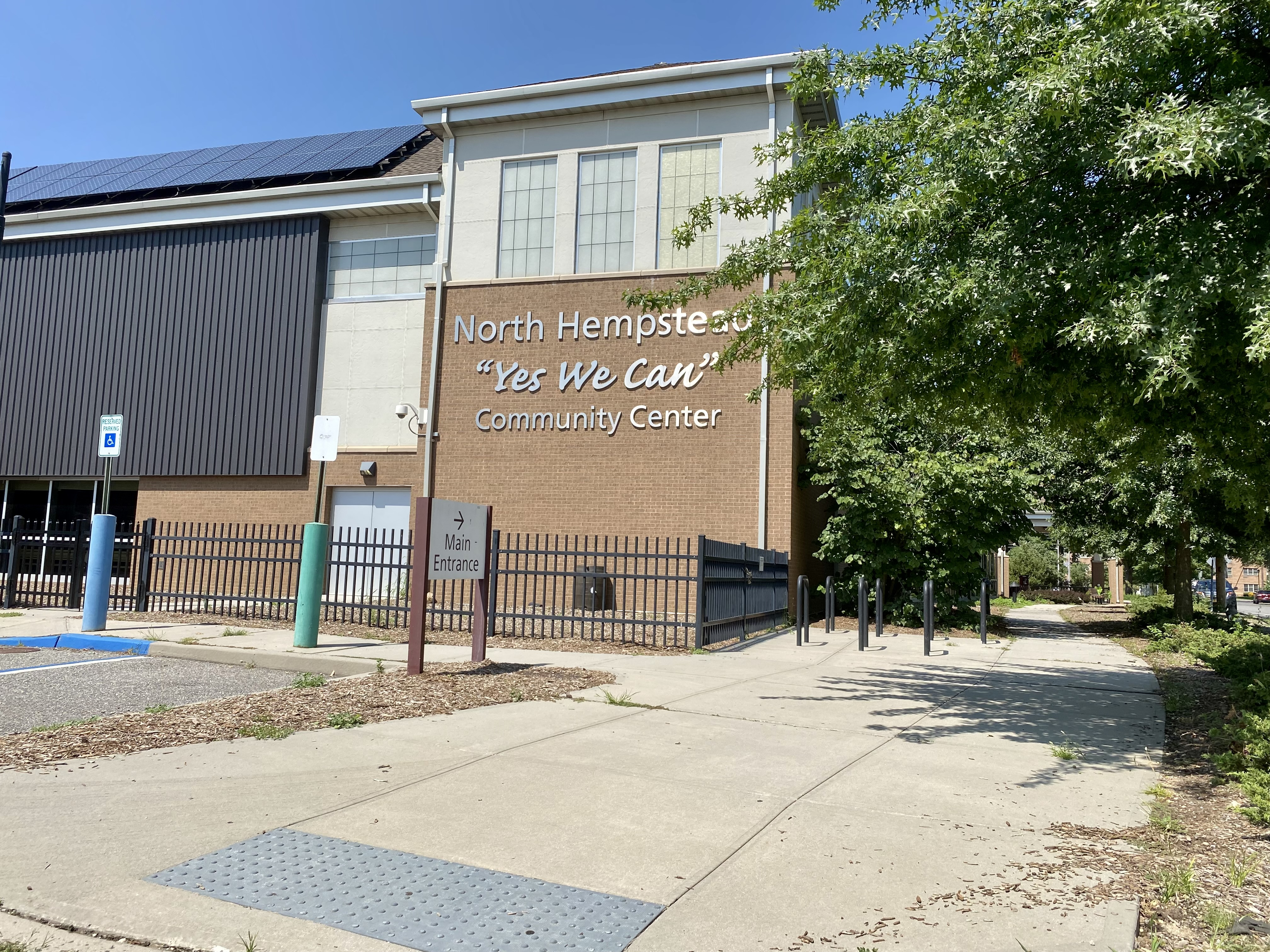
- The "Yes We Can" Community Center in 2021
- Interactive map of "Yes We Can" Community Center
- Type: Community center
- Location: 141 Garden Street, New Cassel, New York, United States
- Area: 60,000 sq. feet (5,600 sq. meters)
- Opened: September 8, 2012
- Owner: Town of North Hempstead
- Website: Town of North Hempstead – "Yes We Can" Community Center

The "Yes We Can" Community Center is a community center in New Cassel, in Nassau County, on Long Island, in New York, United States. It is located within and operated by the Town of North Hempstead.

== Description ==
The community center opened in 2012, and the opening ceremony took place on September 8 of that year. The community center's name is a nod to Barack Obama's 2008 campaign slogan. It is located at 141 Garden Street in New Cassel. The center has an NBA-sized basketball court, an exercise room, and party rooms, as well as classrooms and activity rooms and community spaces, and programs for children. The rental of space at the center is also available.

The community center also serves as the practice facility for the Long Island Nets.

The center is approximately 60,000 square feet (5,600 m^{2}).

== Media ==
The community center houses the studios of North Hempstead TV (NHTV), which is the Town of North Hempstead's 24-hour television channel.

== Awards ==
The "Yes We Can" Community Center is a LEED Platinum-certified building for its environmentally-friendly design.
