= East Meadow Union Free School District =

School district in Salisbury, New York

East Meadow Union Free School District (EMUFSD) is a school district headquartered in the Salisbury Center in Salisbury, New York.

The district was first established as the Common School District #3 in 1812, with a change in organization two years later.

The "Union Free" moniker identifies multiple primary schools feeding into a lesser number of high schools. It has nothing to do with labor unions. The East Meadow Union Free School District teachers are part of the East Meadow Teachers Association which is affiliated with NYSUT, AFT, NEA, and AFL-CIO.

== Schools ==
High schools

- East Meadow High School
- W. T. Clarke High School

Middle schools

- W.T. Clarke Middle School
- Woodland Middle School

Elementary schools

- Barnum Woods
- Bowling Green School
- George McVey Elementary School
- Meadowbrook Elementary School
- Parkway Elementary School
