= Carle Place station =

Long Island Rail Road station in Nassau County, New York

Carle Place
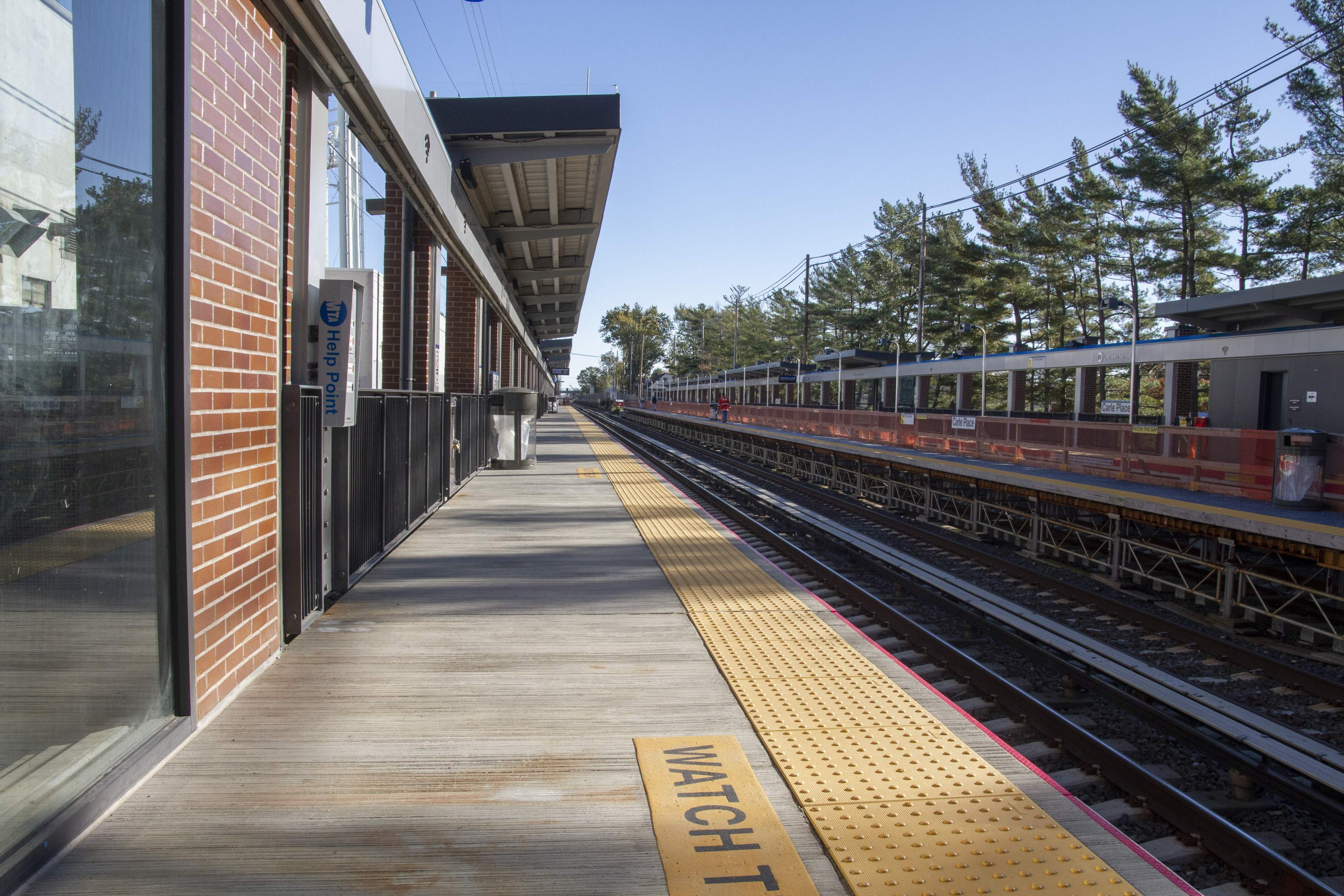
- The renovated Carle Place station in 2021. The temporary eastbound platform in front of the newer one is visible at right.

General information
- Location: Cherry Lane & Atlantic Avenue; Carle Place, NY
- Coordinates: 40.749195°N 73.603705°W
- Owner: Long Island Rail Road
- Line: Main Line
- Distance: 20.4 mi (32.8 km) from Long Island City
- Platforms: 2 side platforms
- Tracks: 3
- Connections: Nassau Inter-County Express: n22

Construction
- Parking: Yes
- Cycle facilities: Yes
- Accessible: Yes

Other information
- Station code: CPL
- Fare zone: 7

History
- Opened: 1837; 189 years ago
- Rebuilt: 1952; 74 years ago, 2021; 5 years ago
- Electrified: October 19, 1970; 56 years ago 750 V (DC) third rail
- Former names: Carll Place

Passengers
- 2012—2014: 921 per weekday

Services
| Preceding station | Long Island Rail Road | Following station |
|---|---|---|
| Mineola toward Penn Station, Grand Central or Long Island City | Port Jefferson Branch | Westbury toward Huntington or Port Jefferson |
Ronkonkoma Branch does not stop here
Montauk Branch does not stop here
Former services
| Preceding station | Long Island Rail Road | Following station |
|---|---|---|
| Mineola toward Long Island City or Penn Station | Main Line | Westbury toward Greenport |
Location

Carle Place (previously known as Carll Place) is a station along the Main Line of the Long Island Rail Road (LIRR). It is served by trains on the Port Jefferson Branch at all times while most Ronkonkoma Branch trains and all Montauk Branch trains bypass the station. It is located at Cherry Lane and Atlantic Avenue in Carle Place, New York.

== History ==
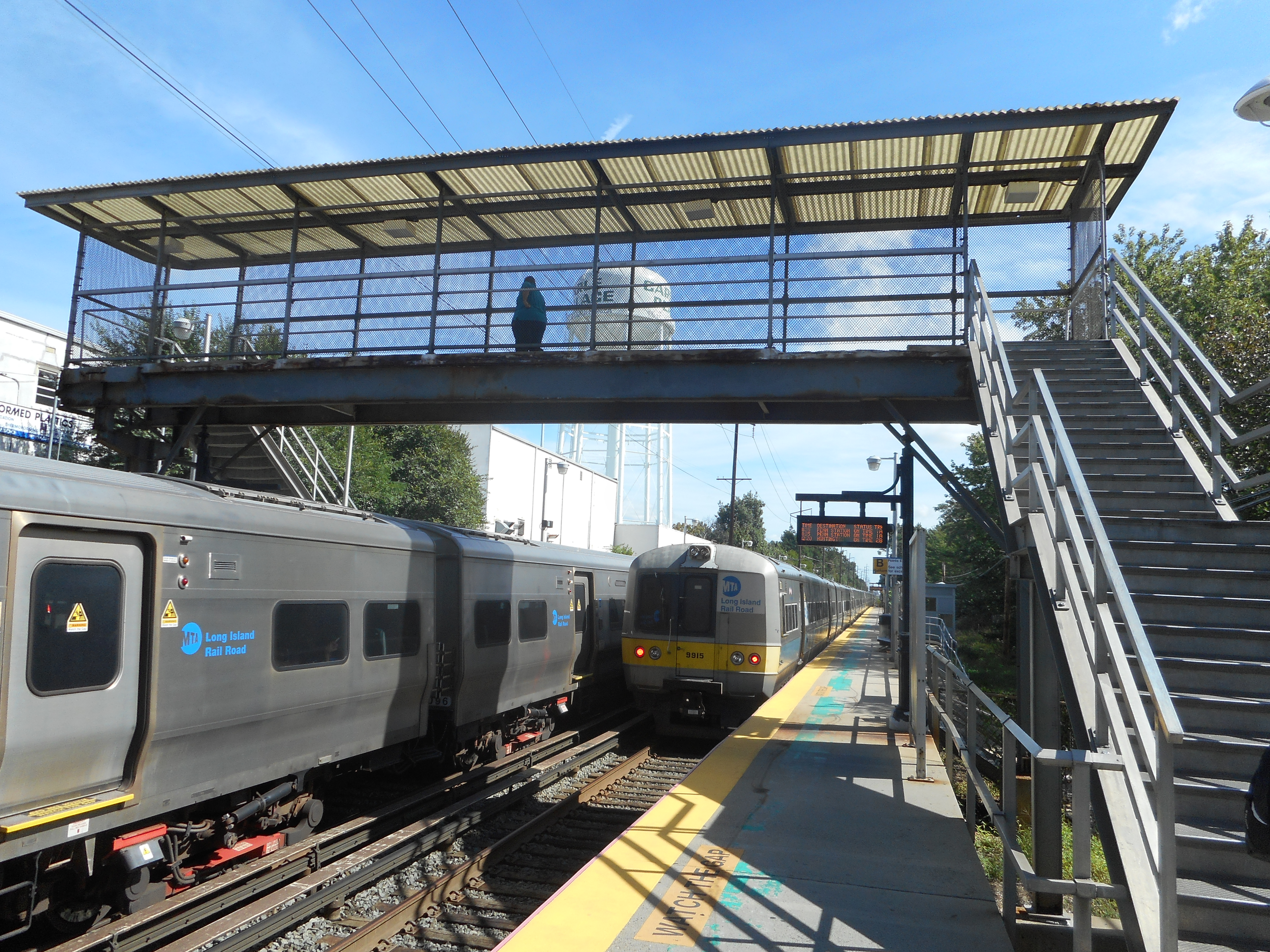
The Carle Place station in 2015, prior to being renovated and the installation of a third track.

Carle Place was built on March 1, 1837 with the opening of the LIRR to Hicksville. The station was closed sometime in 1859, however it was revived in 1923 as a sheltered shed. In 1950, the station was removed and then relocated 400 feet (120 m) east of the former location, opening on January 21, 1952. The station has existed as a pair of platformed shelters ever since then. In October 1970, the electrification of the Port Jefferson Branch between Mineola and Huntington Stations was completed.

As part of the Main Line third track project, the Carle Place station was upgraded to accommodate full-length 12-car trains. Canopies, benches, signage, and security cameras were installed. The station was made compliant with the Americans with Disabilities Act of 1990 via the installation of elevators and ramps, as well as the replacement of the existing overpass. Amenities such as Wi-Fi, USB charging stations, artwork, and digital information displays were included in the renovation. The electrical substation at Carle Place station was replaced to make way for the third track.

== Station layout ==
This station has two high-level side platforms, each 12 cars long. During rush hours, trains stop at both platforms in the peak direction. Some Port Jefferson Branch trains, most Ronkonkoma Branch trains, and all Montauk Branch trains pass through the station without stopping.

Both platforms have staircase going down to Cherry Lane and Atlantic Avenue on their extreme west end. At their center, the eastbound platform has a staircase and ramp that connects to a pedestrian walkway to Garden Avenue, while the westbound platform has two short ramps leading to the dead-end of Stonehinge Lane. The station's only two ticket vending machines are here under a green kiosk. A steel overpass connects the platforms at this point. On the extreme east end, the eastbound platform has a staircase going to the dead-end of Carle Road.

In March 2019, both platforms had their western halves demolished from Cherry Lane to the pedestrian overpass as part of the Third Track Project. This temporarily left the station with two platforms, six cars long from the pedestrian overpass to Carle Road.
