= Westbury station (LIRR) =

Long Island Rail Road station in Nassau County, New York

Westbury
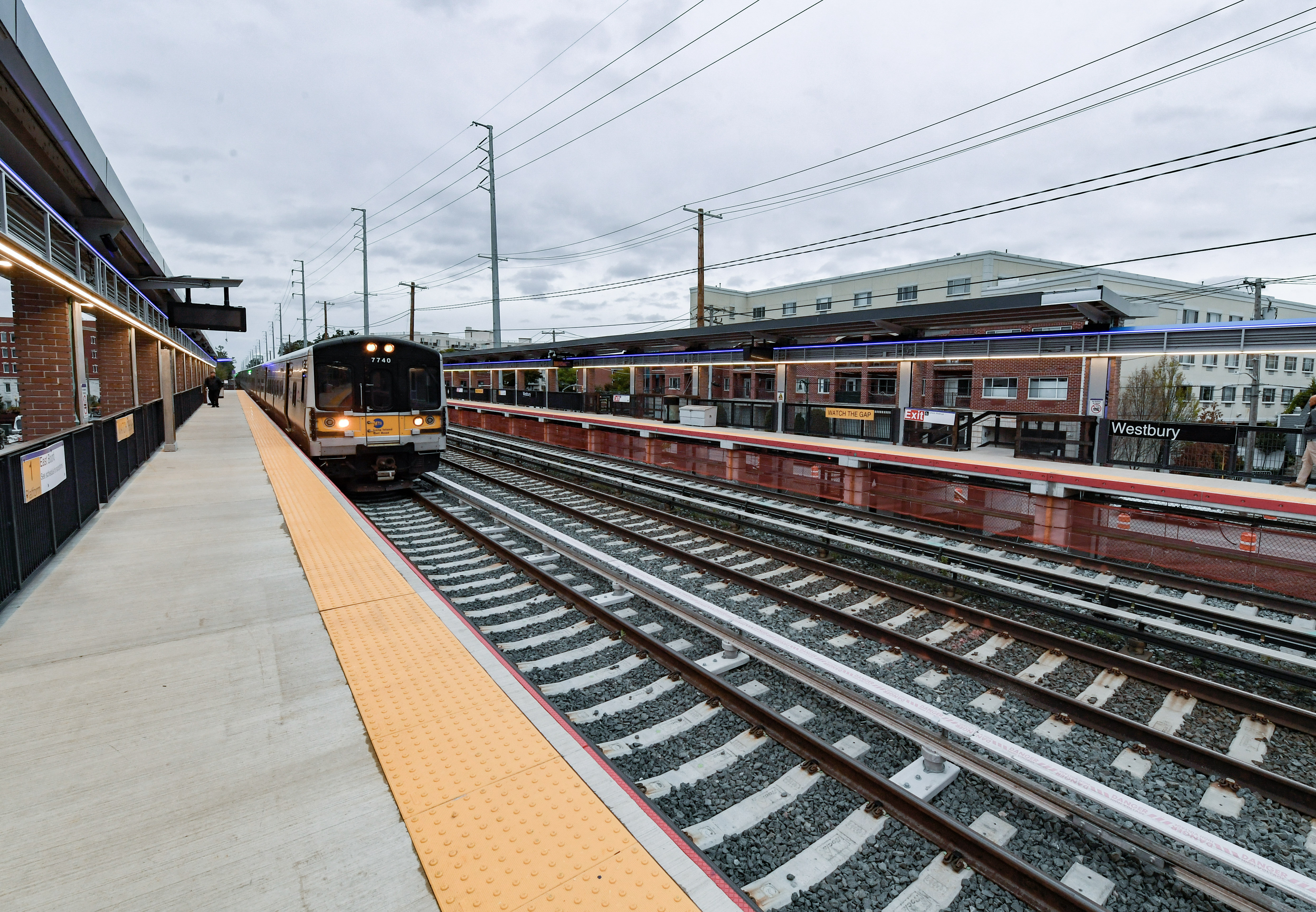
- Westbury station, as seen in 2022

General information
- Location: Union Avenue & Post Avenue; Westbury, NY
- Coordinates: 40.753404°N 73.586273°W
- Owner: Long Island Rail Road
- Line: Main Line
- Distance: 21.4 mi (34.4 km) from Long Island City
- Platforms: 2 side platforms
- Tracks: 3
- Connections: Nassau Inter-County Express: n35

Construction
- Parking: Yes
- Cycle facilities: Yes
- Accessible: Yes

Other information
- Station code: WBY
- Fare zone: 7

History
- Opened: 1837; 189 years ago
- Rebuilt: 1883; 143 years ago, 1914; 112 years ago, 1972; 54 years ago, c. 2001–2005; 21 years ago, 2021; 5 years ago
- Electrified: October 19, 1970; 56 years ago 750 V (DC) third rail

Passengers
- 2012–2014: 3,861 per weekday

Services
Preceding station	Long Island Rail Road	Following station
Carle Place toward Penn Station, Grand Central or Long Island City	Port Jefferson Branch	Hicksville toward Huntington or Port Jefferson
Ronkonkoma Branch does not stop here
Montauk Branch does not stop here
Former services
Preceding station	Long Island Rail Road	Following station
Carle Place toward Long Island City or Penn Station	Main Line	Hicksville toward Greenport
Location

Westbury is a station on the Long Island Rail Road's Main Line located at Union and Post Avenues in Westbury, New York. All trains for the Port Jefferson and Ronkonkoma Branches and some Montauk Branch trains run through the station, although typically, only Port Jefferson Branch trains stop. It is 23.4 miles (37.7 km) east of Pennsylvania Station. The station is fully compliant with the Americans with Disabilities Act of 1990, and it has two side platforms and three tracks.

== History ==
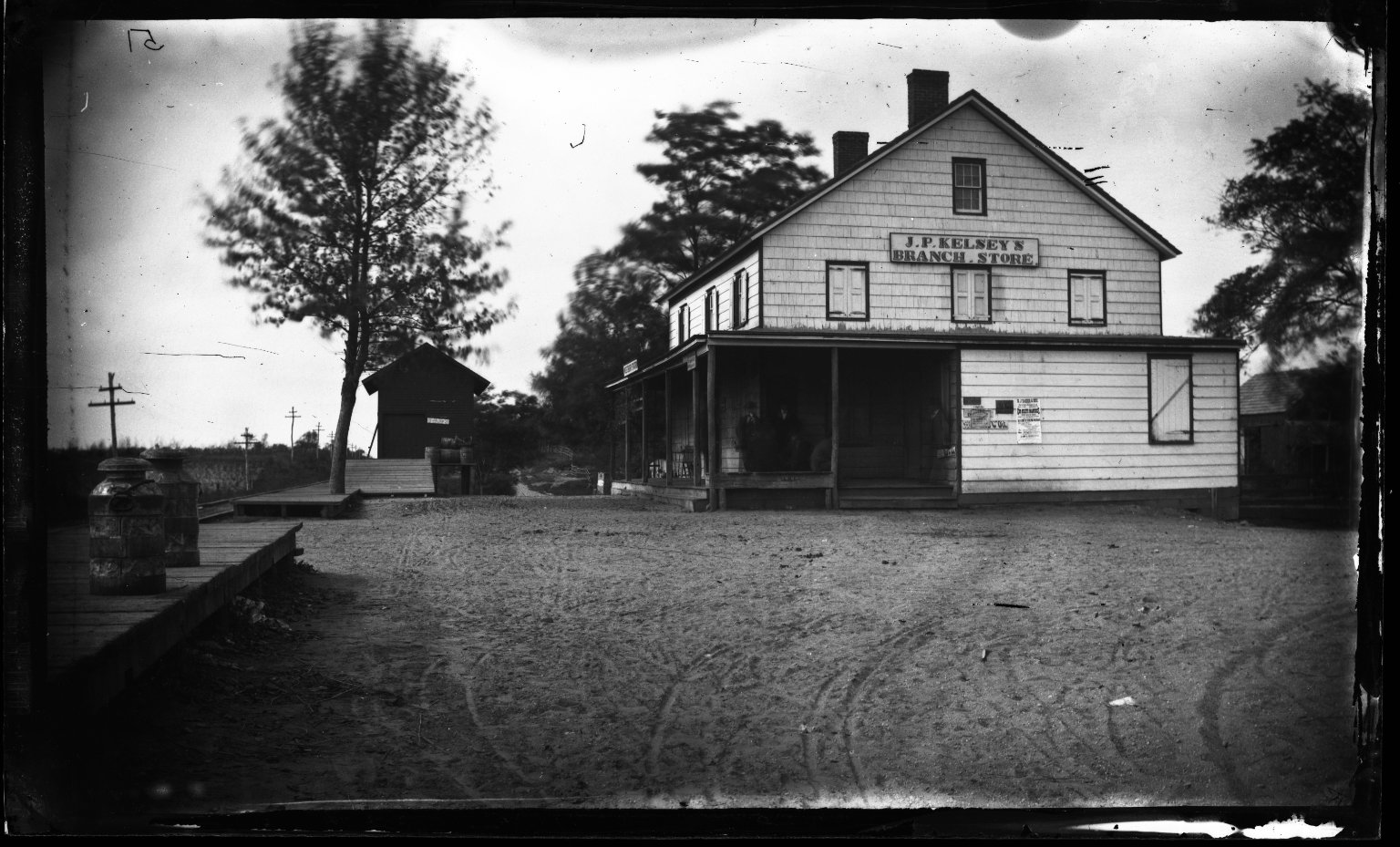
The original Westbury station was the J.P. Kelsey General Store

The Westbury station was built at some point in March 1837, with the opening of the Long Island Rail Road to Hicksville. The station was closed between June and September of the same year, briefly replaced by the nearby Carle Place station. Throughout much of the mid-19th Century, the J.P. Kelsey Branch Store served as the station's depot. The second station was built between April and June 1883. The third station was built in 1914.

The station was electrified in October 1970, along with the rest of the Port Jefferson Branch between the Mineola and Huntington Stations; the electrification allowed for direct service between Westbury and Pennsylvania Station to the west – as well as Hicksville & Huntington to the east. It was extensively remodeled around 1972, and it underwent another major remodeling project in the early 21st century, between 2001 and 2005.

On February 26, 2019, a local eastbound train to Hicksville collided with a truck at the School Street crossing just east of the station as it was accelerating out of the station. A few seconds after that collision, a westbound Ronkonkoma Branch express train headed for Penn Station collided with the already-slammed truck at the crossing and derailed past it, slamming into the eastern end of the westbound platform. The collision caused extensive damage to both the westbound platform (easternmost two car lengths) and M7 train car #7425, killed the three occupants of the truck, and required the replacement of multiple power poles. The crossing was eliminated as part of the Third Track Project between May and November 2020, and was replaced with an underpass.

=== Post Avenue Bridge replacement ===
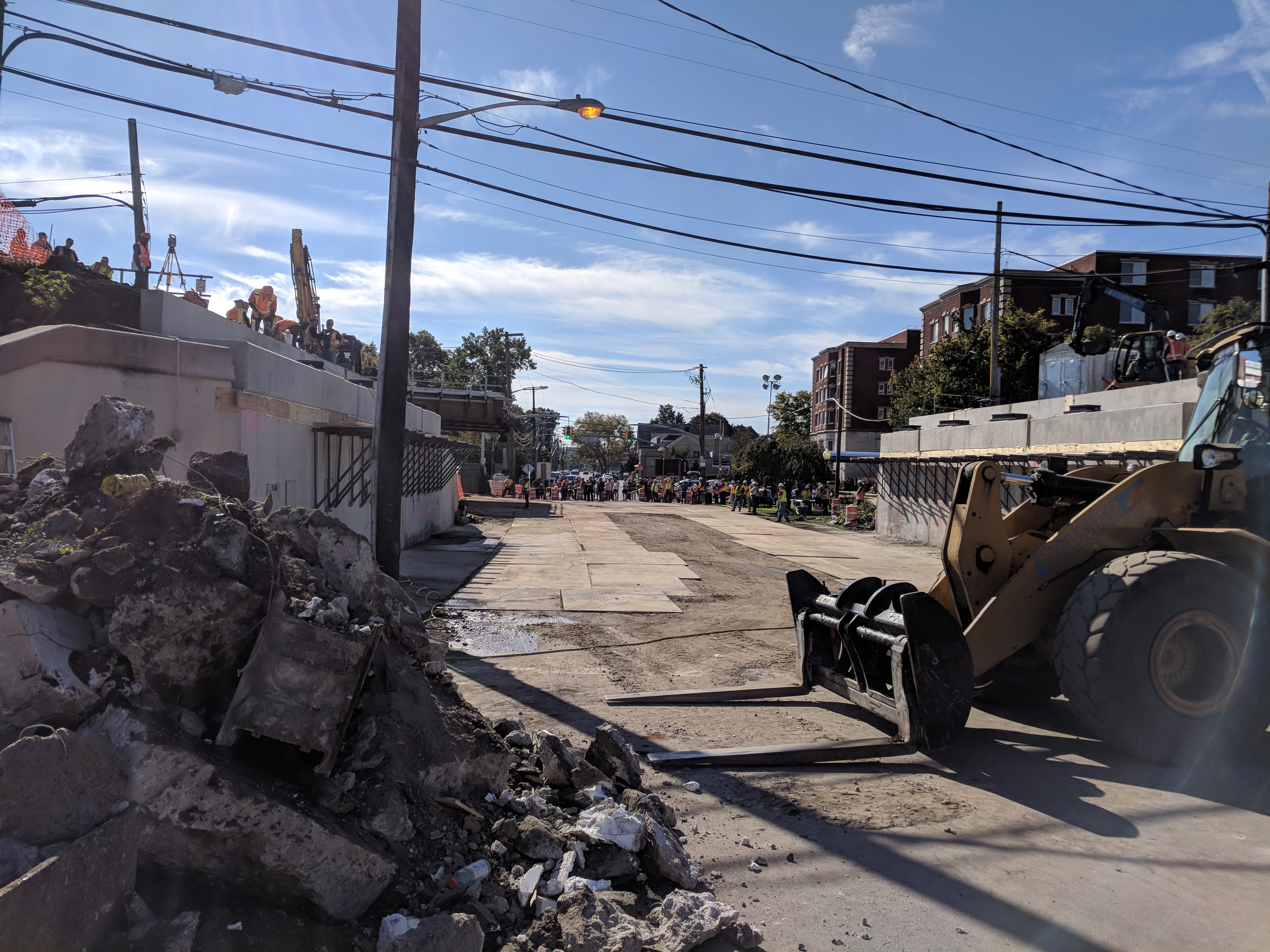
LIRR construction workers replacing the Post Avenue bridge next to the station in October 2017.

The station is located next to a bridge over Post Avenue that had an 11-foot-10-inch (3.61 m) clearance that was installed during the 1914 rebuild. The bridge was hit by between five and nine high trucks per year between 2010 and 2016, causing numerous train delays in both directions. In October 2017, the LIRR replaced the old bridge with a new bridge. Despite the fact that the previous bridge was built 103 years prior, it was still considered to be in good condition. However, the bridge had to be replaced in preparation for the LIRR third track project; the new span had a 14-foot (4.3 m) clearance and could accommodate a total of three tracks.

=== Station enhancements ===
Also as part of the third track project, the Westbury station was upgraded to accommodate full-length 12-car trains. Platform A was replaced and Platform B was relocated. Canopies, benches, signage, and security cameras were installed. The station, which is already compliant with the Americans with Disabilities Act of 1990, saw further accessibility improvements, namely the installation of new elevators and ramps along with a new overpass. Amenities such as Wi-Fi, USB charging stations, artwork, and digital information displays were included in the renovation. The electrical substation at Westbury station was replaced to accommodate the third track, and a parking garage was erected on the north side of the station. The Village of Westbury has also sought to redevelop the land south of the station as a transit-oriented development.

== Station layout ==
This station has two high-level side platforms, each 12 cars long. During rush hours, trains will stop at both platforms in the peak direction. Most Ronkonkoma Branch trains, some Port Jefferson Branch trains, and all Montauk Branch trains pass through the station without stopping.
