= Salisbury, Nassau County, New York =

Salisbury, New York South Westbury
- Hamlet and census-designated place
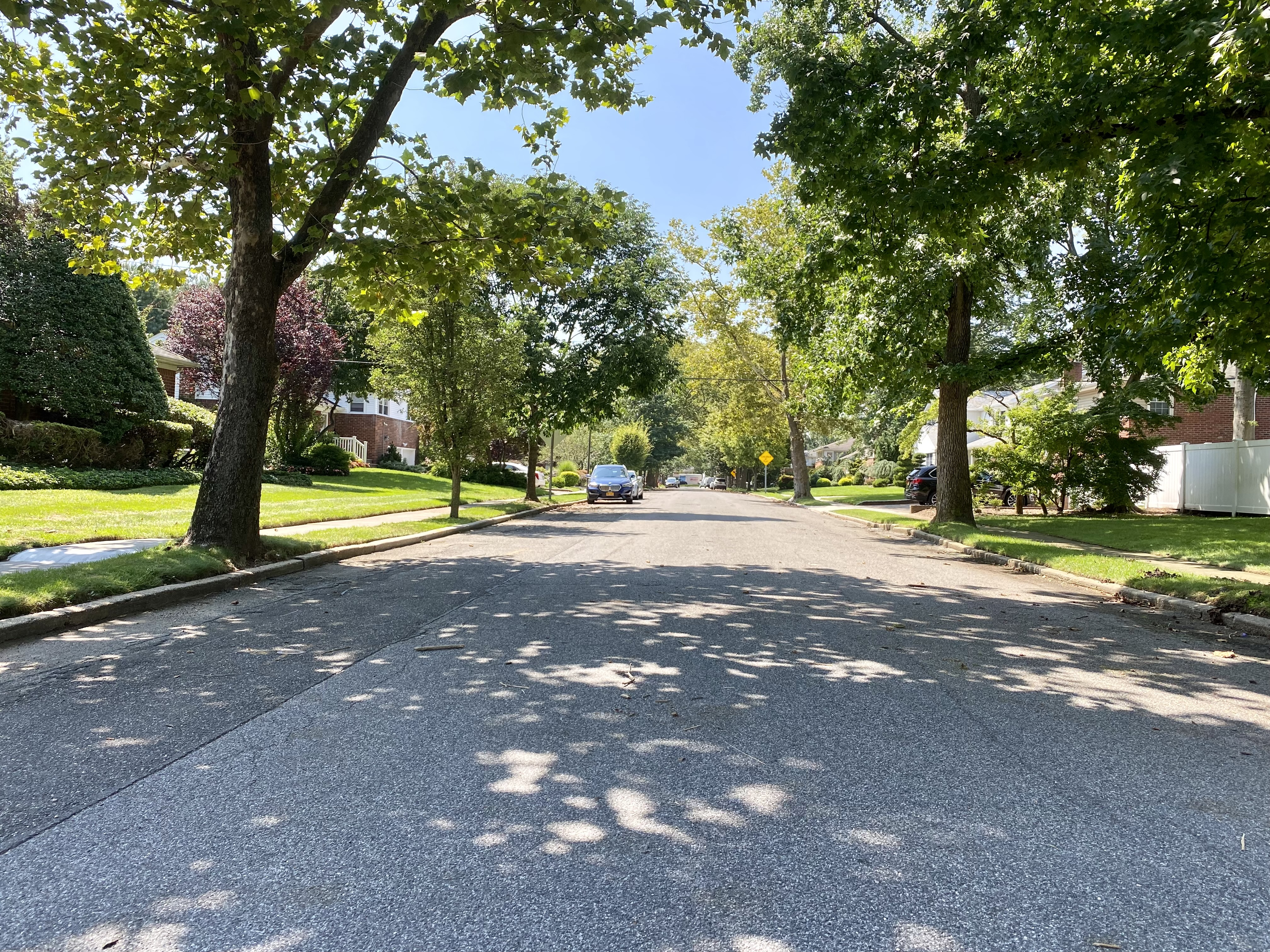
- A street in Salisbury on August 25, 2021.

- Location in Nassau County and the state of New York

- Location on Long Island Location within the state of New York
- Coordinates: 40°44′43″N 73°33′34″W
- Country: United States
- State: New York
- County: Nassau
- Town: Hempstead
- Named for: Reminiscence to Salisbury Plain, England

Area
  - Total: 1.7 sq mi (4.4 km^{2})
  - Land: 1.7 sq mi (4.4 km^{2})
  - Water: 0 sq mi (0.0 km^{2})
- Elevation: 108 ft (33 m)

Population (2020)
  - Total: 12,618
  - Density: 7,400/sq mi (2,900/km^{2})
- Time zone: UTC-5 (Eastern (EST))
  - Summer (DST): UTC-4 (EDT)
- ZIP Code: 11590 (Westbury)
- Area codes: 516, 363
- Website: eastmeadowchamber.com

Salisbury (formerly known as South Westbury) is a hamlet and census-designated place (CDP) in the Town of Hempstead in Nassau County, on Long Island, in New York, United States. The population was 12,093 at the 2010 census.

Many Levitt style homes lie adjacent to Eisenhower Park (formerly known as Salisbury Park).

It is served by the Westbury station of the Long Island Rail Road and shares fire districts with Westbury and East Meadow.

== History ==
Salisbury is so named because it sits on a broad, flat section of the larger Hempstead Plains that reminded late 19th Century Long Islanders of the Salisbury Plain in England, where Stonehenge is located. This name was made the CDP's official name for the 1990 census, replacing the older name of South Westbury (which referenced its geographic location immediately south of Westbury).

== Geography ==
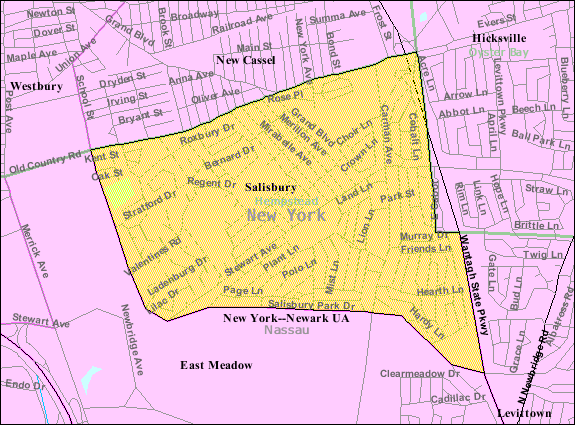
U.S. Census map of Salisbury.

According to the United States Census Bureau, the CDP has a total area of 1.7 square miles (4.5 km^{2}), of which 1.7 square miles (4.5 km^{2}) is land and 0.57% is water.

According to the United States Geological Survey, Salisbury is located at an elevation of 108 feet (33 m).

== Demographics ==
Historical population
Census	Pop.	Note	%±
1960	11,977		—
1970	10,978		−8.3%
1980	9,732		−11.3%
2000	12,341		—
2010	12,093		−2.0%
2020	12,618		4.3%
U.S. Decennial Census Long Island Historical Population

At the 2000 census, there were 12,341 people, 4,015 households and 3,340 families residing in the CDP. The population density was 7,164.1 inhabitants per square mile (2,766.1/km^{2}). There were 4,052 housing units at an average density of 2,352.3 per square mile (908.2/km^{2}). The racial makeup of the CDP was 89.94% White, 1.03% African American, 0.14% Native American, 5.97% Asian, 0.01% Pacific Islander, 1.60% from other races, and 1.31% from two or more races. Hispanic or Latino people of any race were 8.56% of the population.

There were 4,015 households, of which 37.2% had children under the age of 18 living with them, 69.9% were married couples living together, 10.4% had a female householder with no husband present, and 16.8% were non-families. 13.9% of all households were made up of individuals, and 8.3% had someone living alone who was 65 years of age or older. The average household size was 3.06 and the average family size was 3.35.

Age distribution was with 24.4% under the age of 18, 7.1% from 18 to 24, 28.2% from 25 to 44, 24.7% from 45 to 64, and 15.6% who were 65 years of age or older. The median age was 39 years. For every 100 females, there were 93.0 males. For every 100 females age 18 and over, there were 89.5 males.

The median household income was $73,641, and the median family income was $81,110. Males had a median income of $50,503 versus $37,002 for females. The per capita income for the CDP was $27,579. About 1.9% of families and 3.7% of the population were below the poverty line, including 3.5% of those under age 18 and 4.3% of those age 65 or over.

== Education ==
Salisbury is located primarily located within the boundaries of (and is thus served by) the East Meadow Union Free School District, although a small portion zoned for commercial use is within the Uniondale Union Free School District. As such, all children who reside within Salisbury and attend public schools go to East Meadow's schools.
