= Miller Place, New York =

- Hamlet and census-designated place
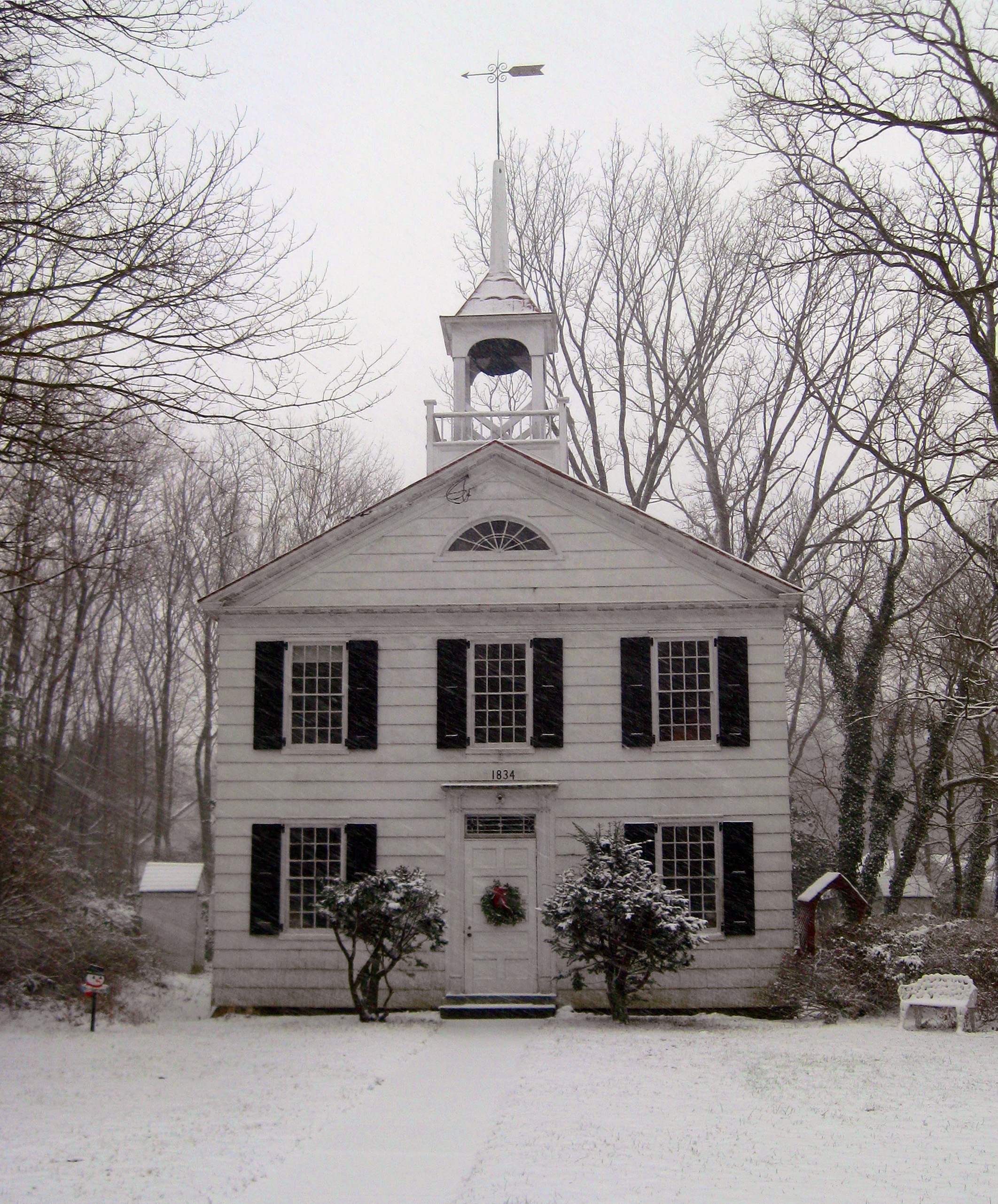
- The historic Academy Schoolhouse of Miller Place

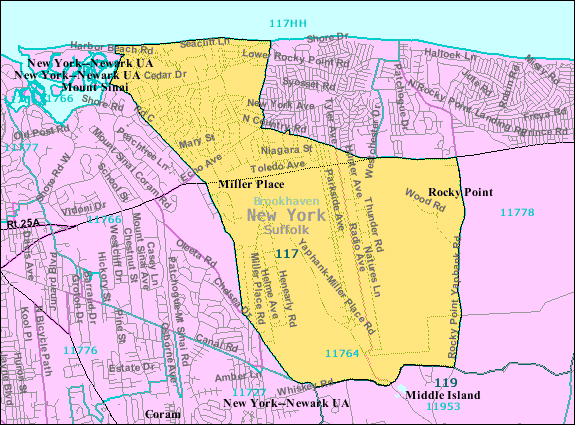
- U.S. Census map

- Location on Long Island Location within the state of New York
- Coordinates: 40°56′48″N 72°59′35″W
- Country: United States
- State: New York
- County: Suffolk
- Town: Brookhaven

Area
  - Total: 7.73 sq mi (20.01 km^{2})
  - Land: 6.55 sq mi (16.96 km^{2})
  - Water: 1.18 sq mi (3.05 km^{2})
- Elevation: 130 ft (40 m)

Population (2020)
  - Total: 11,723
  - Density: 1,790.0/sq mi (691.12/km^{2})
- Time zone: UTC−05:00 (Eastern Time Zone)
  - Summer (DST): UTC−04:00
- ZIP Code: 11764
- Area codes: 631, 934
- FIPS code: 36-47306
- GNIS feature ID: 0957319

Miller Place is a hamlet and census-designated place (CDP) in the Town of Brookhaven, Suffolk County, New York, United States. Despite preserving much of its historic identity, changes in the 20th century have transitioned the hamlet into a desirable and densely populated suburban area. The population was 11,723 at the 2020 census.

Miller Place and Mount Sinai are historically linked, with residents sharing such institutions as the Mount Sinai Congregational Church, located on the hamlet's border. The harborfront section of Port Jefferson, 5 miles to the west, serves as a primary commercial downtown walking area for residents of both Miller Place and Mount Sinai.

== History ==
=== Agricultural hamlet ===
Miller Place has been inhabited since the 17th century and is named for the Miller family that included many of its initial settlers. For most of its history, the community functioned as an agriculture-based society.

The land that Miller Place occupies was purchased from the native Setalcott tribe in 1664 by settlers of Setauket. The parcel also included what would become Mount Sinai, an adjacent community of similar character with which Miller Place would share a variety of functions throughout its history.

The first known dwelling in the area was constructed in the 1660s by Captain John Scott, an important figure in Long Island's early history. This house was named Braebourne and features on a map of the New England region credited to Scott, who served as a royal advisor and cartographer among other occupations. This abode, on the eastern side of Mount Sinai Harbor, was one of three houses John Scott commissioned, and the actual occupier is unknown.

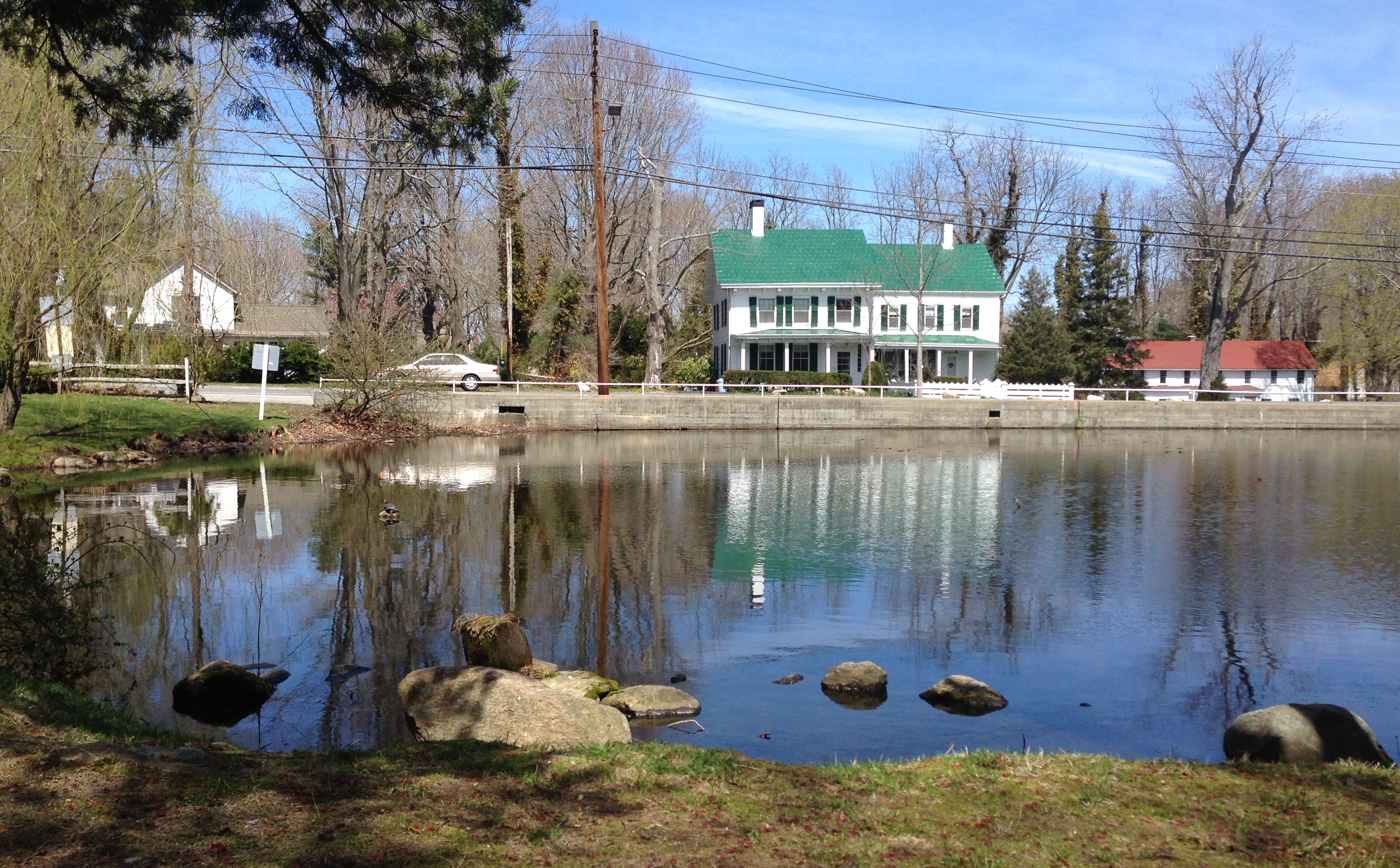
The Miller Place Duck Pond on North Country Road

While the original settler of Miller Place is unknown, the settling of the region is largely credited to the original Miller family. In 1679, an East Hampton settler named Andrew Miller purchased a 30-acre (120,000 m^{2}) plot. Miller was a cooper by profession, and records indicate that he had emigrated from either Maidstone, England or Craigmillar, Scotland.

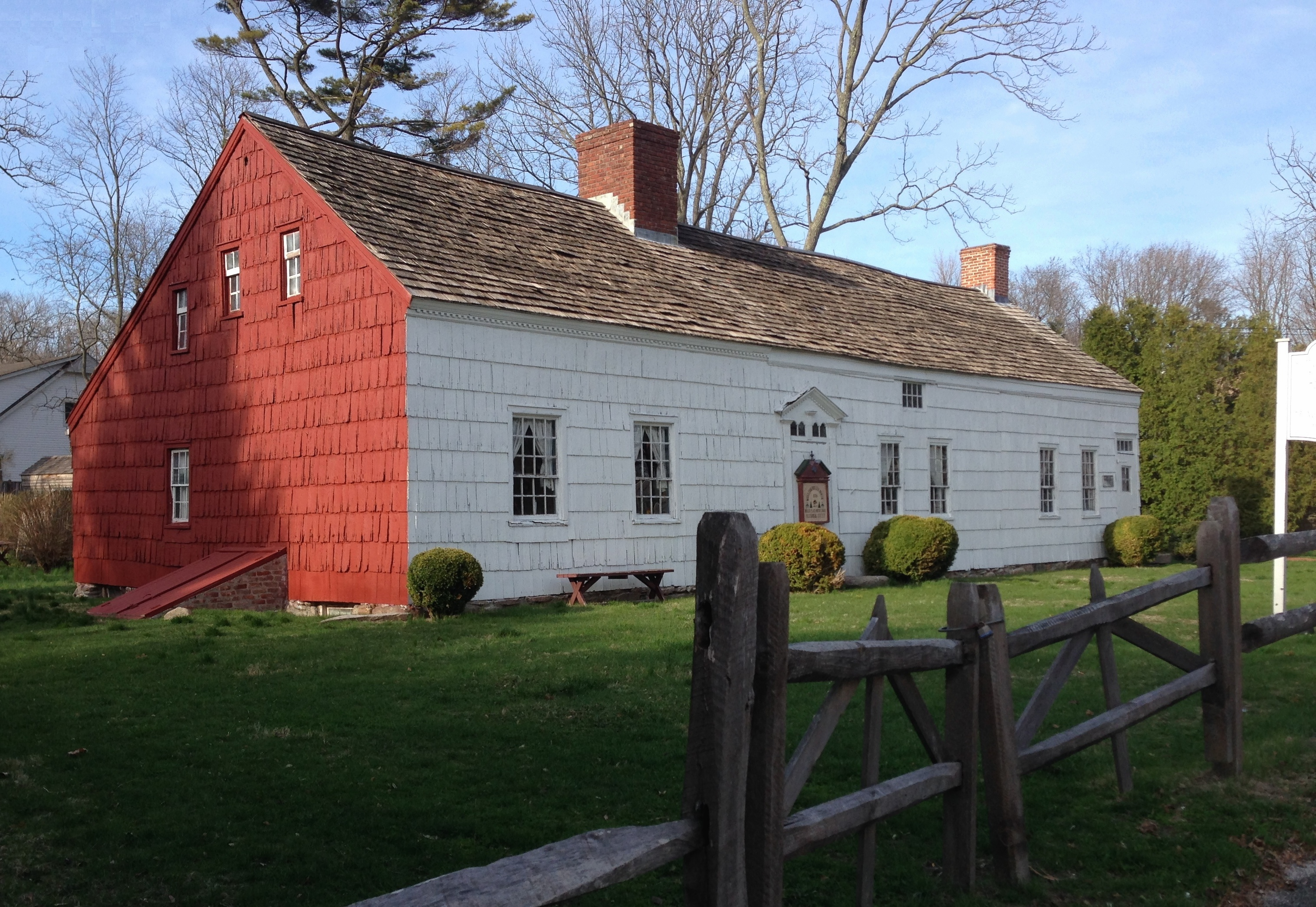
The William Miller House, with sections dating from 1720 to 1816

By the early 1700s, the community had become known as Miller's Place. The Miller family expanded well into the 18th century and continually developed houses in the northern part of the hamlet. The Millers were in time joined by members of such families as the Helmes, Robinsons, Burnetts, Hawkins, Woodhulls, and Thomases. Many roads in the present hamlet have been named after historical families.

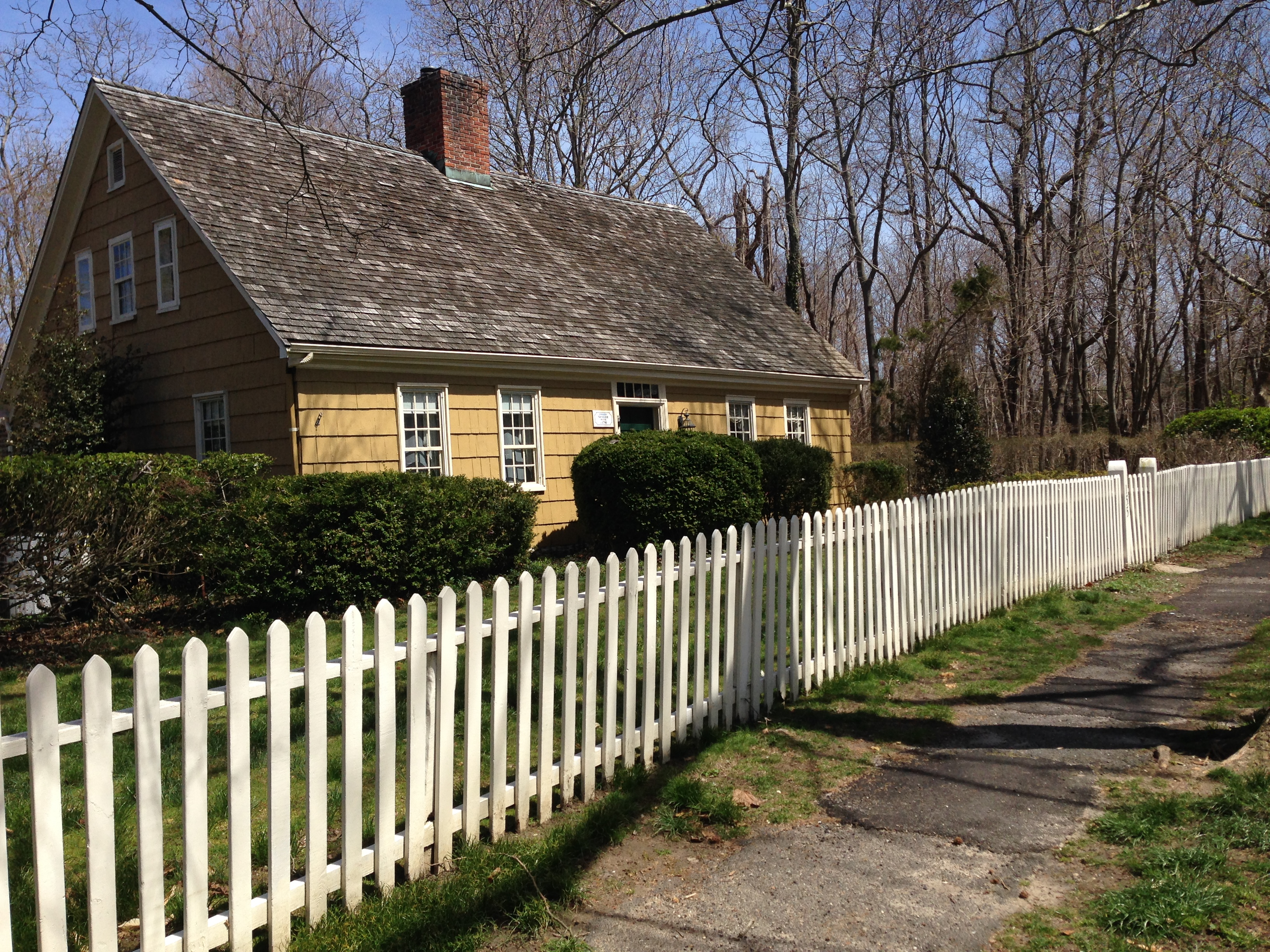
The 1785 Timothy Miller house

The oldest extant house is the home of William Miller, Andrew Miller's grandson, composed in three sections between 1720 and 1816 at a prominent location on North Country Road. The hamlet's many extant historical structures are centered on this thoroughfare, forming the core of the Miller Place Historic District. Listed on the National Register of Historic Places in 1976, it became the first historic district in the Town of Brookhaven. Separately listed is the Samuel Hopkins House.

The American Revolutionary War divided the town, with the majority siding with the Patriot cause but families being split across both lines. A number of midnight raids occurred, one of which resulted in the shooting of a teenage Miller who had peered out of his window to check on the commotion. The march of Benjamin Tallmadge, who led eighty men to the victorious overthrow of a British stronghold at Manor St. George, traversed along the town's western border.

In 1789, the neighboring communities of Miller Place and Mount Sinai organized a Congregational church on the town border. While the Mount Sinai Congregational Church building (an extant structure from 1807) is technically in Mount Sinai, the house for its minister was built in Miller Place and continues to be used for that purpose.

The first two public schools in the hamlet were established in 1813 and 1837. In 1834 the Miller Place Academy, a private school, was established under the leadership of a Yale graduate. Though the academy itself closed in 1868, it served as a public school from 1897 until the 1937 opening of what is now the North Country Road Middle School. The Miller Place Academy structure remains as one of the community's symbols and currently houses a free library.

=== Resort town ===
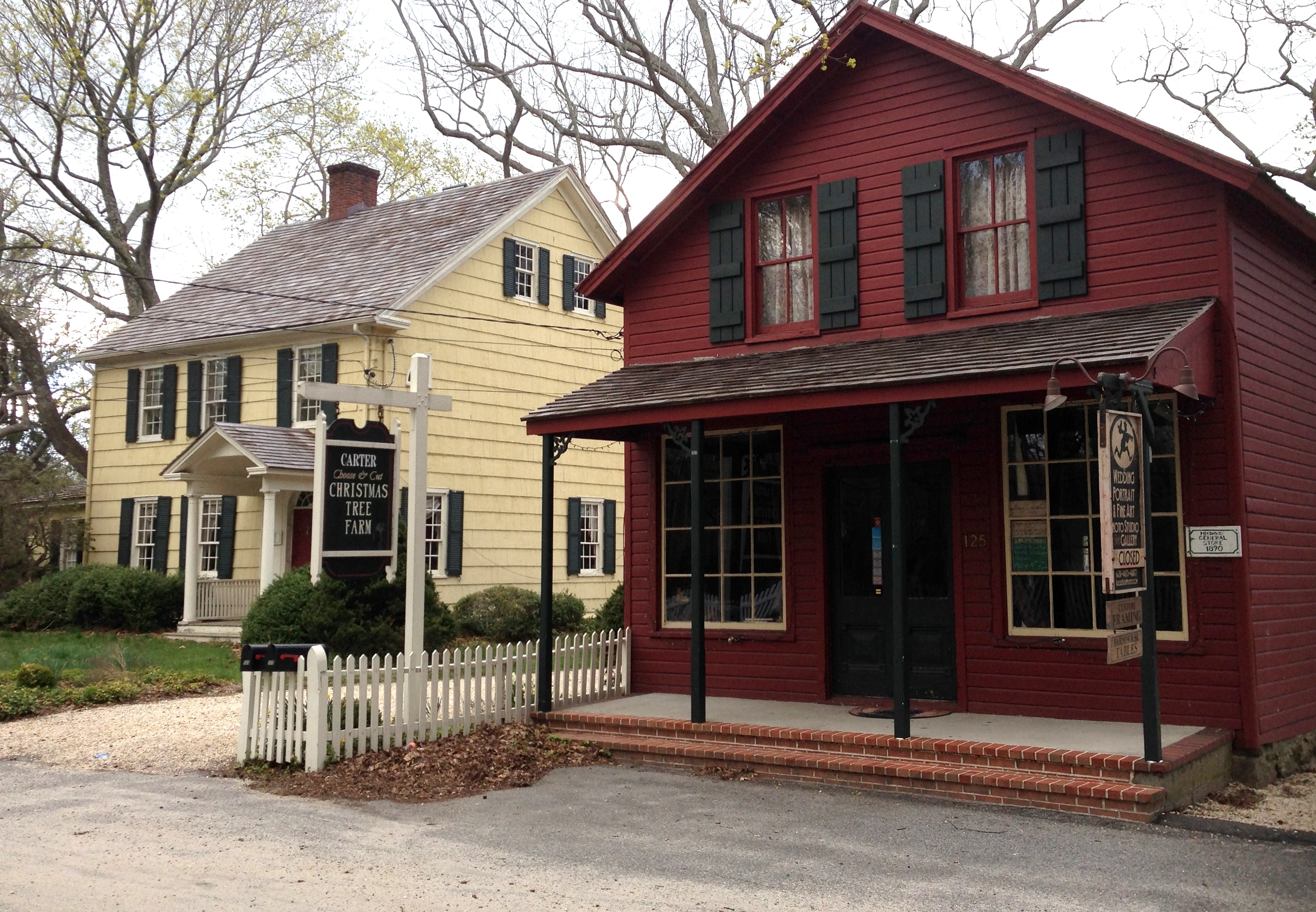
Built in 1890, The Miller Place Country General Store, which formerly served as a combined general store and town post office

In 1895 the hamlet became home to a station of the Long Island Rail Road, which was located near the present-day intersection of Sylvan and Echo Avenues. It transported people to stops westward to Port Jefferson and New York City or eastward to Wading River. After the station was destroyed in a 1903 fire, a new one was built. However, this building was destroyed in 1934 by another fire, and the Eastern railroad lines were soon abandoned. In 2013 an agreement was signed between local politicians and the Long Island Power Authority (LIPA), which currently manages the strip on which the railroad operated, to convert this land into a public bicycle trail.

In the latter 19th century, Miller Place became a popular summer resort location. This led to a building boom of beach-side bungalows, rustic log cabins, and commercial activities to accommodate the new seasonal residents. A barn-like building known as the Harbor House operated as a dormitory-style vacation house for young girls until it was destroyed in a 1962 fire. Camp Barstow, a Girl Scout camp near the beach, was active until 1980 and has since become public parkland.

=== Modern development ===
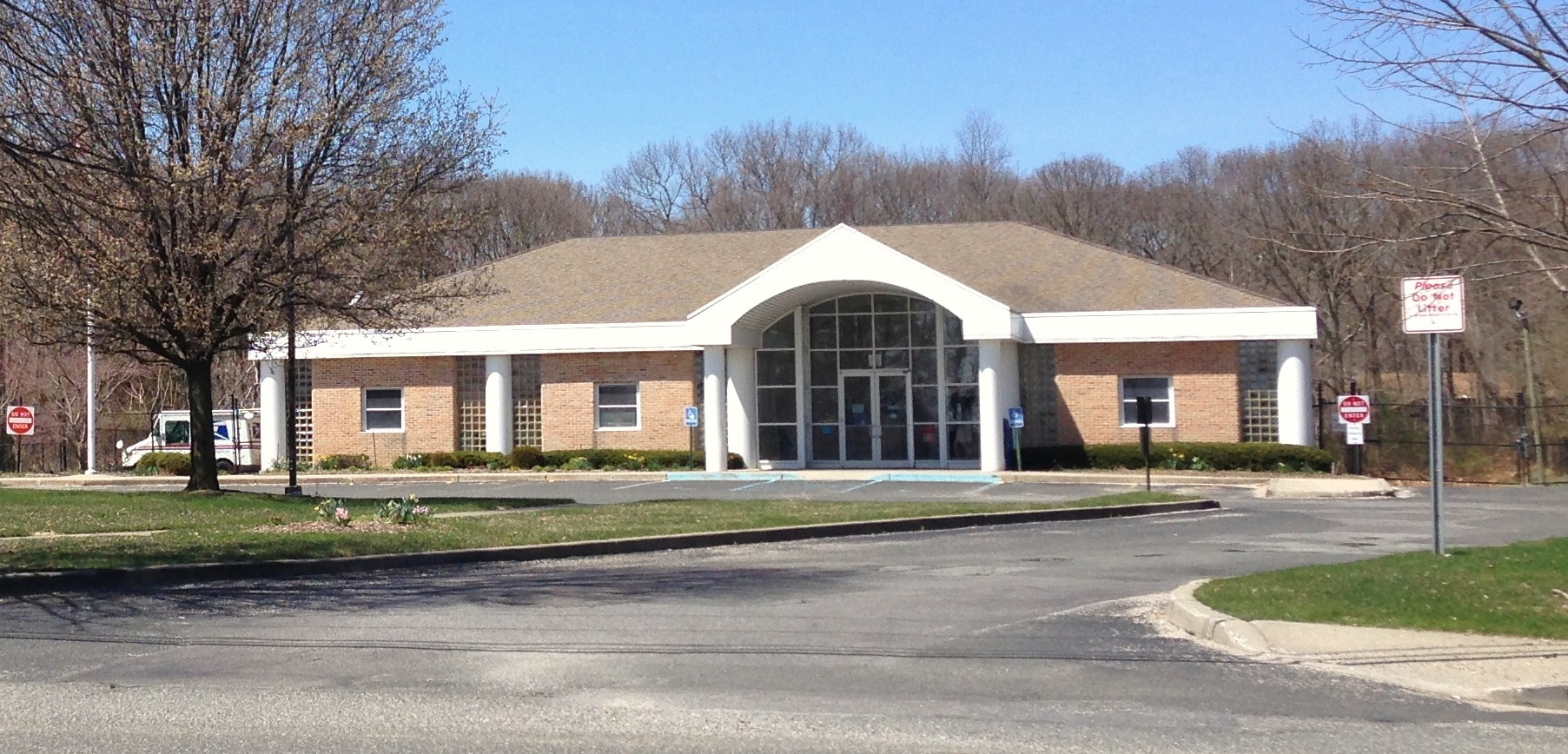
The Miller Place post office since 1990

In the decades following World War II, the population of Miller Place greatly expanded, and the majority of beach cottages were repurposed as family homes.

A 2012 plan by the Town of Brookhaven aims to comprehensively manage Route 25A between Mount Sinai and Wading River under planning strategies counter to those of car-oriented mid-century suburbia. For Miller Place, it intends to transition the section at Echo and Sylvan Avenues into a traditional downtown center with new mixed-use development and an expanded Sylvan Avenue Park that would complement the current town post office and senior center. The plan additionally calls for the preservation of the DeLea Sod Farm, the largest agricultural parcel remaining on the Miller Place stretch of Route 25a.

== Geography ==
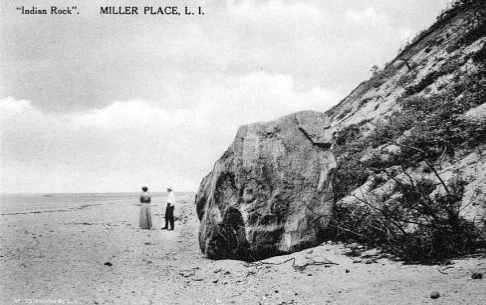
Indian Rock on Miller Place Beach

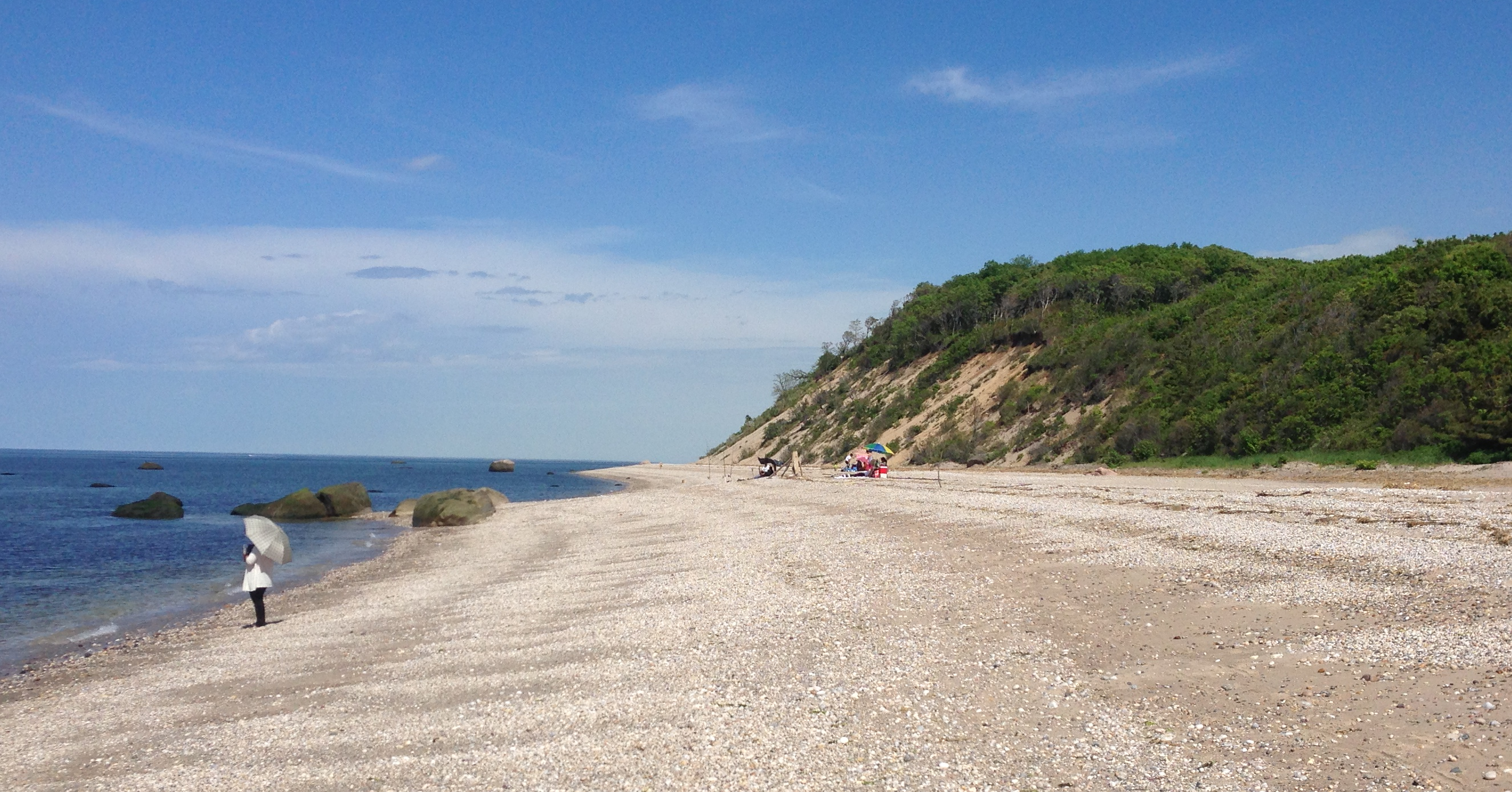
Beach on Long Island Sound in Miller Place

Miller Place is located on North Shore of Long Island and features a two-mile section of beach. It also hugs the east side of Mount Sinai Harbor, which it shares with neighboring Mount Sinai and Port Jefferson. The hamlet also borders with Sound Beach, Rocky Point, Middle Island and Coram.

The 73rd meridian west passes directly through Miller Place.

The area is hilly in some patches, mostly near the beach, but generally has grass and trees. Though the soil is suitable for agriculture, desire for housing has led most farms to be developed into suburban housing communities or commercial locations.

Historical population
Census	Pop.	Note	%±
2020	11,723		—
U.S. Decennial Census

== Demographics ==
=== 2020 census ===
As of the 2020 census, Miller Place had a population of 11,723. The median age was 43.4 years. 22.4% of residents were under the age of 18 and 18.0% of residents were 65 years of age or older. For every 100 females there were 97.3 males, and for every 100 females age 18 and over there were 94.5 males age 18 and over.

100.0% of residents lived in urban areas, while 0.0% lived in rural areas.

There were 4,001 households in Miller Place, of which 34.8% had children under the age of 18 living in them. Of all households, 67.1% were married-couple households, 10.9% were households with a male householder and no spouse or partner present, and 18.3% were households with a female householder and no spouse or partner present. About 16.8% of all households were made up of individuals and 9.7% had someone living alone who was 65 years of age or older.

There were 4,157 housing units, of which 3.8% were vacant. The homeowner vacancy rate was 1.0% and the rental vacancy rate was 5.1%.

Racial composition as of the 2020 census
Race	Number	Percent
White	10,274	87.6%
Black or African American	191	1.6%
American Indian and Alaska Native	26	0.2%
Asian	351	3.0%
Native Hawaiian and Other Pacific Islander	9	0.1%
Some other race	145	1.2%
Two or more races	727	6.2%
Hispanic or Latino (of any race)	882	7.5%

=== 2010 census ===
The population was 12,339 at the 2010 census. The population density was 1,883.4 inhabitants per square mile (727.2/km^{2}).

=== Demographic estimates ===
According to 2019 ACS estimates, 10.9% of residents were between ages 18 and 24, 17.6% were between ages 25 and 44, and 29.1% were between ages 45 and 64; 48.6% of the population was female. QuickFacts reported 3.11 persons per household.

=== Income and poverty ===
The median income (in 2019 US dollars) for a household in the CDP was $130,341. The per capita income for the CDP was $49,772. 2.5% of the population were below the poverty threshold.

== Economy ==
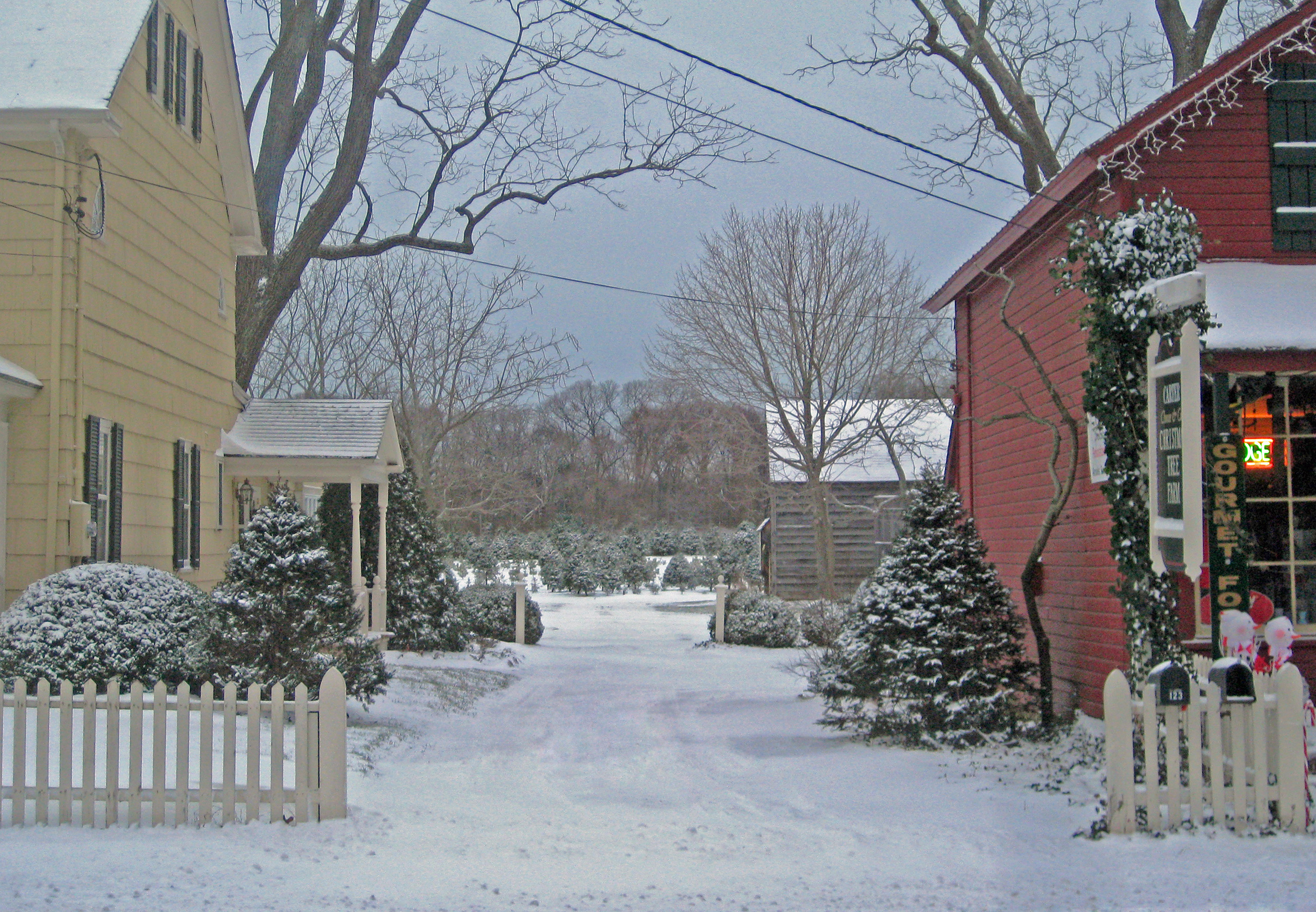
Entrance to the Carter Christmas Tree Farm, the only extant farm north of Route 25A

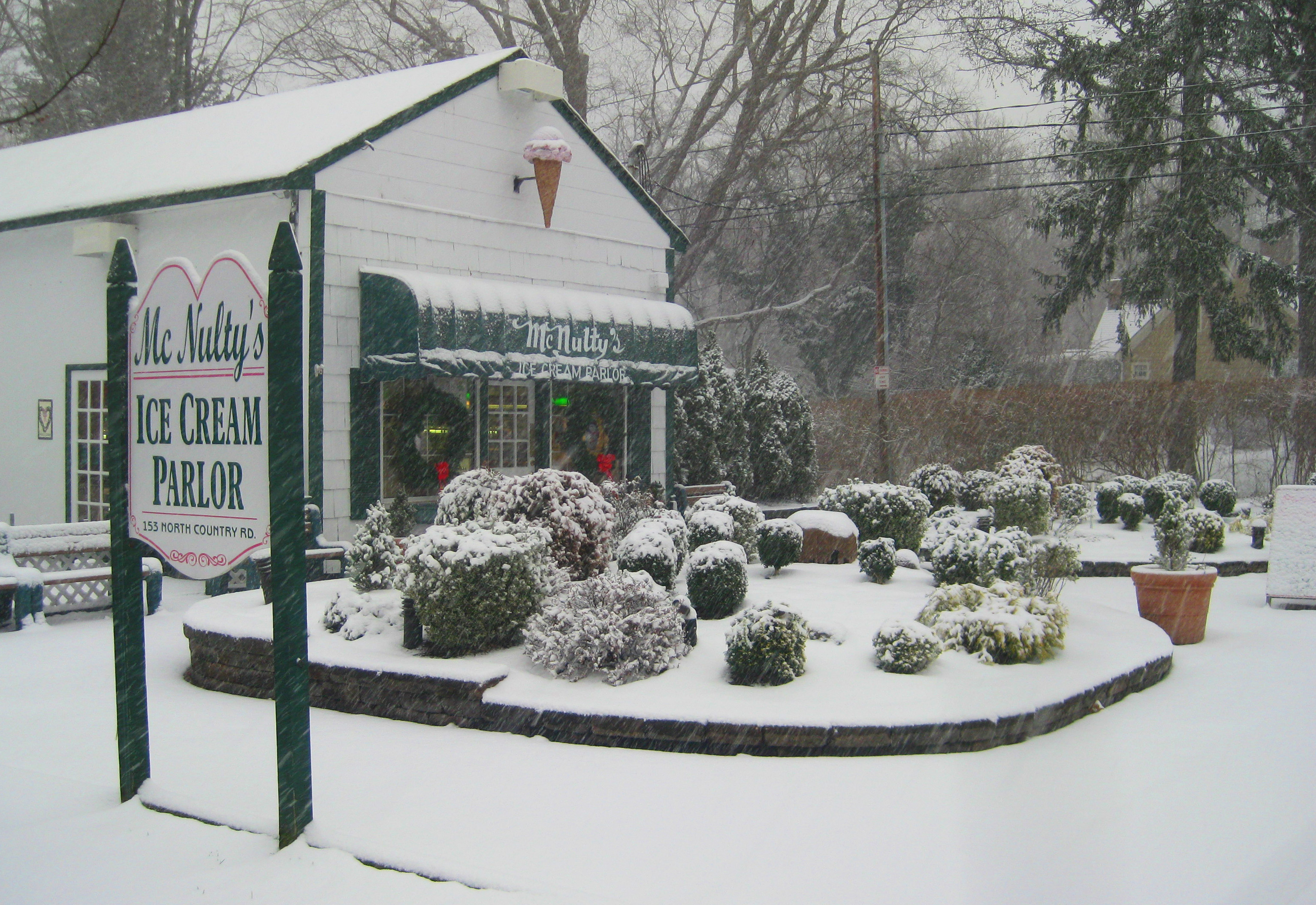
McNulty's Ice Cream Parlor

The center of commerce within the hamlet has largely transitioned from the historic North Country Road to the modern Route 25A.

Along North Country Road is McNulty's, a family-owned ice cream parlor and a fixture of the hamlet, and a handful of inns and restaurants located in historic structures. Route 25A is of a more suburban character, with most businesses being corporate chains and located in strip malls. Also along Route 25A are multiple pizza parlors, a bagel store, a deli, and a local coffee shop and bar.

The hamlet is home to many residents who commute daily to New York City. Commuters either use the Long Island Rail Road, with the nearest stations in Port Jefferson and Ronkonkoma, or drive along the extensive highway system that had been developed by Robert Moses. A number of residents also work at nearby Stony Brook University and Brookhaven National Laboratory.

== Parks and recreation ==
Cordwood Landing County Park has become a popular local destination. The park consists of hilly, wooded trails that lead directly down to extended Cedar Beach.

== Education ==
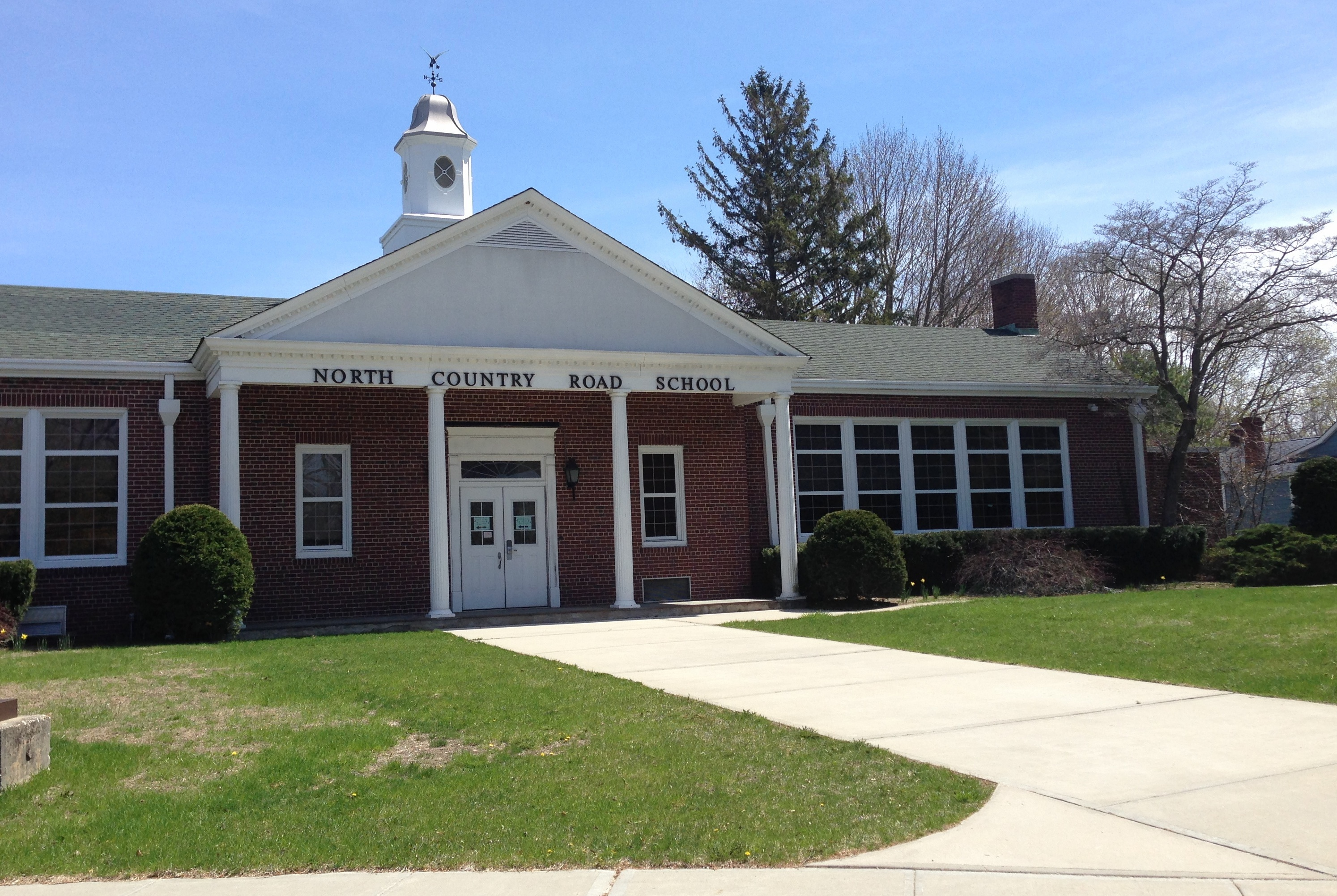
North Country Road Middle School

The four schools of the Miller Place Union Free School District are scattered throughout the hamlet and serve both Miller Place and much of the hamlet of Sound Beach. These include the Andrew Muller Primary School (K-2), Laddie A. Decker Sound Beach School (3–5), North Country Road Middle School (6–8), and the Miller Place High School (9–12). The high school has been ranked the 78th in the nation for students taking AP classes. The school's mascot is a panther, while the school colors are red, white and blue.

== Health care ==
There is one walk-in clinic and urgent care center in Miller Place; Caremed Primary and Urgent Care.

== Notable people ==
- Mike DelGuidice, guitarist and vocalist for the Billy Joel Band
- Rick Donnelly, former punter for the Atlanta Falcons.
- Ralph Macchio, actor of Italian ancestry
- Caleb Smith Woodhull, mayor of New York City from 1849 to 1851

== See also ==
- Miller Place High School
- Miller Place station
