= Samuel Hopkins =

Samuel Hopkins or Sam Hopkins may refer to:

- Samuel Hopkins (inventor) (1743–1818), American inventor who was awarded the first US patent for a process to refine potash
- Samuel Hopkins (theologian) (1721–1803), American clergyman who formulated a religious system called Hopkinsism or Hopkinsianism
- Samuel Hopkins (congressman) (1753–1819), United States Congressman from Kentucky
- Samuel I. Hopkins (1843–1914), U.S. Representative from Virginia
- Samuel M. Hopkins (1772–1837), United States Representative from New York
- Sam Hopkins (rugby league) (born 1990), English rugby league footballer
- Lightnin' Hopkins (Sam John Hopkins, 1912–1982), American blues guitarist
- Sam Hopkins (artist) (born 1979), Artist whose work is rooted in Kenya

== See also ==
- Samuel Hopkins House, a historic home in Suffolk County, New York
