= Rick Donnelly =

American football player (born 1962)

No. 3
- Position: Punter

Personal information
- Born: May 17, 1962 (age 64); Miller Place, New York, U.S.
- Listed height: 6 ft 0 in (1.83 m)
- Listed weight: 190 lb (86 kg)

Career information
- High school: Miller Place (NY)
- College: Wyoming
- NFL draft: 1985: undrafted

Career history
- New England Patriots (1985)*; Atlanta Falcons (1985–1988); Seattle Seahawks (1990–1991)
- * Offseason or practice squad member only

Awards and highlights
- 2× Second-team All-Pro (1987, 1988); Led NFL in punts (1988)

Career NFL statistics
- Punts: 376
- Punting yards: 15,828
- Punting average: 42.1
- Stats at Pro Football Reference

Richard Patrick Donnelly (born May 17, 1962) is a former punter in the National Football League (NFL). He played for the Atlanta Falcons and the Seattle Seahawks. He was an All-Pro in 1987 and 1988, and led the NFL in punts in 1988 with 98. He played college football at Wyoming.

== Early life ==
Donnelly taught himself to kick footballs on the street in front of his house: "I'd get three footballs, go out into the road, kick them back and forth and run after them all day long." He was inspired by his older brother, Joe, who played fullback at Post.

Donnelly attended Miller Place High School in Miller Place, New York, where he played football and baseball. He played kicker on the football team, though he was also the team's starting quarterback as a senior. Donnelly committed to play college football at Wyoming over other schools such as Penn State and Syracuse. "I was really just trying to get away from it all, get away from the East," he said. "I had grown up there, lived there all my life. I wanted something different."

== College career ==
Donnelly averaged 39.6 yards per punt as a freshman at Wyoming. As a senior in 1984, he finished third in the nation with an average of 47.5 yards per punt. He also went three for six on field goals and 30 for 30 on extra points, and was invited to play in the East–West Shrine Bowl.

== Professional career ==
After going undrafted in the 1985 NFL draft, Donnelly signed a free agent contract with the New England Patriots in June. He played in two preseason games, averaging 44.5 yards per punt, but he was waived in favor of veteran Rich Camarillo. Donnelly was signed by the Atlanta Falcons on August 23, and the team soon released their veteran punter, Ralph Giacomarro. Donnelly set a franchise record in a game against the Philadelphia Eagles on November 10, when he averaged 52.1 yards on seven punts, besting Billy Lothridge' 50-yard average on September 17, 1967. However, he suffered a season-ending knee injury the following week against the Los Angeles Rams.

In 1987, Donnelly recorded a league-leading gross average of 44.0 yards per punt, finishing just ahead of Pro Bowl punter Jim Arnold.

Donnelly missed the entire 1989 season after undergoing back surgery.

== NFL career statistics ==
Legend
	Led the league
**Bold**	Career high

Year	Team	Punting									
Year	Team	GP	Punts	Yds	Net Yds	Lng	Avg	Net Avg	Blk	Ins20	TB
1985	ATL	11	59	2,574	2,214	68	43.6	**37.5**	0	18	5
1986	ATL	16	78	3,421	2,764	**71**	43.9	35.0	1	19	**9**
1987	ATL	12	61	2,686	2,025	62	**44.0**	32.1	**2**	9	8
1988	ATL	16	**98**	**3,920**	**3,503**	61	40.0	35.7	0	**26**	6
1990	SEA	16	67	2,722	2,308	54	40.6	34.4	0	18	8
1991	SEA	3	13	505	439	57	38.8	33.8	0	1	1
Career		74	376	15,828	13,253	71	42.1	35.0	3	91	37

== Personal life ==
During his time in the NFL he married his former wife Jackie. Together they had three kids, Kale, Jessie, and Bobbie they later divorced due to complications during their marriage, he later remarried to his now wife Debra together they had 2 kids Jackson, and Steven. They now they live together in Cheyenne, Wyoming.
