= Miller Place station =

Former train station in New York, US

Miller Place

General information
- Location: Sylvan Avenue; Miller Place, New York
- Coordinates: 40.942490°N 72.996619°W
- Line: Wading River Branch

History
- Opened: 1898
- Closed: 1938

Former services
Preceding station	Long Island Rail Road	Following station
Port Jefferson toward Hicksville	Wading River Branch	Rocky Point toward Wading River
Location

Miller Place (originally Miller's Place) was a station on the Wading River Extension on the Port Jefferson Branch of the Long Island Rail Road. The station was just east of Sylvan Avenue just north of New York State Route 25A, along what is now access for Long Island Power Authority power lines.

== History ==
Miller Place station was originally built in 1898 during the extension of the Port Jefferson Branch to Wading River, which was once slated to continue eastward and rejoin the Main Line at either Riverhead or Calverton. The station was located on the north side of the tracks to the east of Sylvan Avenue. The first station house opened in 1898 and was destroyed by a fire in September 1903. The station house was replaced but it was also destroyed by a fire in September 1934.

The extension of the Long Island Rail Road to Miller Place near the turn of the century turned the town into a popular summer resort with hotels and summer cottages overlooking Long Island Sound. The importance of the town as a vacation destination declined with the advent of automobile travel and ridership along the Wading River Branch decreased. The line east of Port Jefferson, which included the Miller Place station, was abandoned in 1938. The right-of-way is now owned by the Long Island Power Authority and used for power lines, but there are plans to create a rail trail for bicycling, running, and walking. The trail was opened in June 2022.
