= Rocky Point station =

Former train station in New York, US

Rocky Point
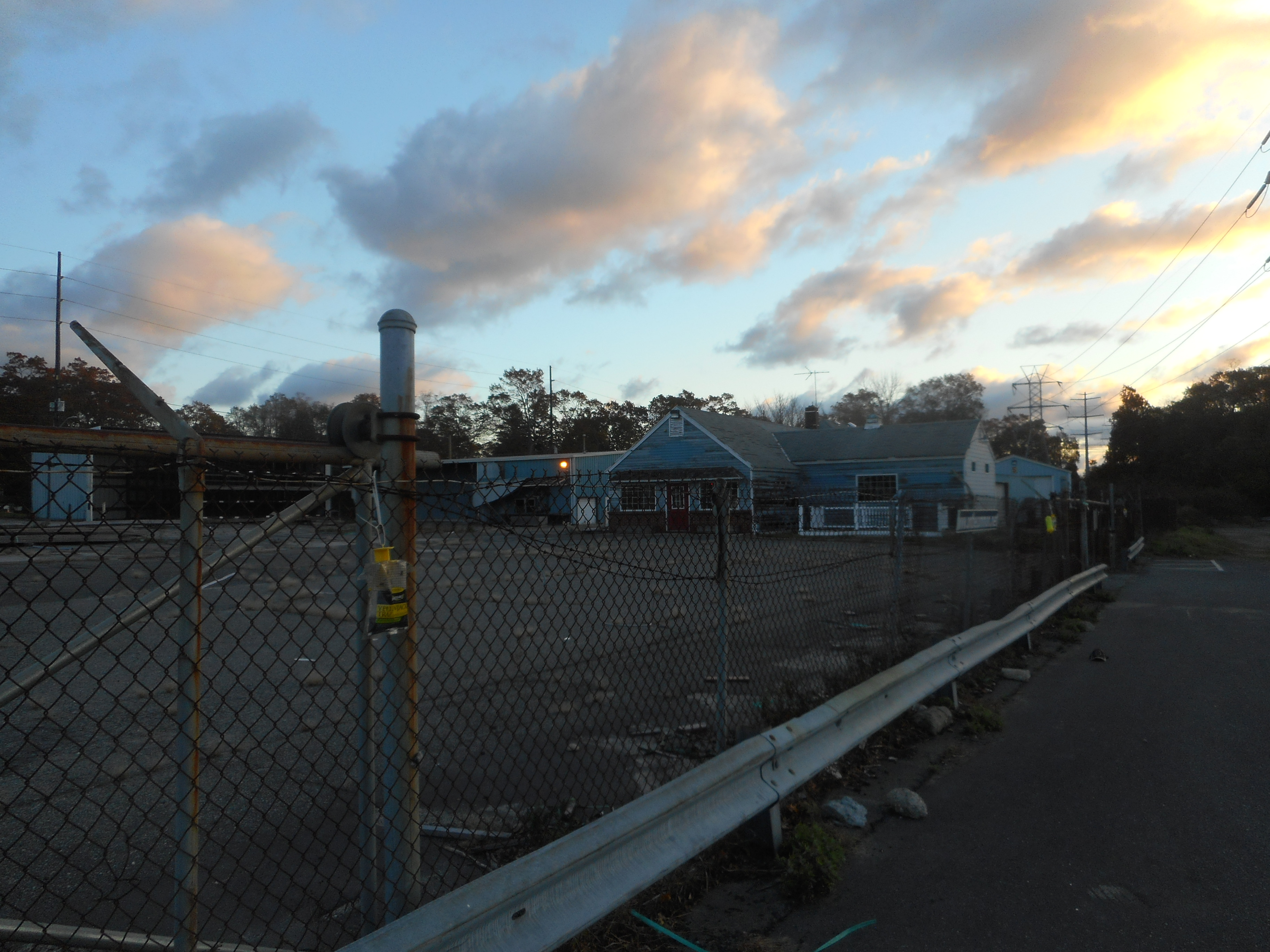
- The former Thurber Lumber yard that occupied the site of the former station until 2016.

General information
- Location: Broadway and Prince Road; Rocky Point, New York
- Coordinates: 40.949660°N 72.922666°W
- Line: Wading River Branch

History
- Opened: June 27, 1895
- Closed: 1938

Former services
Preceding station	Long Island Rail Road	Following station
Miller Place toward Hicksville	Wading River Branch	Shoreham toward Wading River
Location

Rocky Point was a station on the Wading River Extension on the Port Jefferson Branch of the Long Island Rail Road. This abandoned station was just east of Broadway between King Road & Prince Road, along what is now access for Long Island Power Authority power lines. The former train station is now occupied by a museum.

== History ==
Rocky Point station was originally built in 1895 during the extension of the Port Jefferson Branch to Wading River, which was once slated to continue eastward and rejoin the Main Line at either Riverhead or Calverton. A station house was added in 1898 and was later expanded with canopies in 1928 to accommodate crowds of passengers during times when building lots were sold at discount prices.

The line east of Port Jefferson, which included the Rocky Point station, was abandoned in 1938, and the station house was moved a short distance became a lumber yard which survived into the 21st Century. The right-of-way is now owned by the Long Island Power Authority and used for power lines, but there are plans to create a rail trail for bicycling, running, and walking. The Thurber Lumber Yard no longer exists. After the lumber yard closed, the property was rezoned to permit multifamily development. The developer planned to construct senior citizen apartments and renovate the former station house, turning it over to Rocky Point's civic association for use as a Veterans of Foreign Wars (VFW) museum. The VFW Post 6249 Suffolk County World War II & Military History Museum opened in the former station building on December 7, 2023.

== Bibliography ==
- Allen, W.F. (1895). Travelers' Official Railway Guide for the United States, Canada and Mexico Containing Railway Time Schedules, Connections and Distances. New York, New York: The National Railway Publication Company.
