= Sound Beach, New York =

- Hamlet and census-designated place
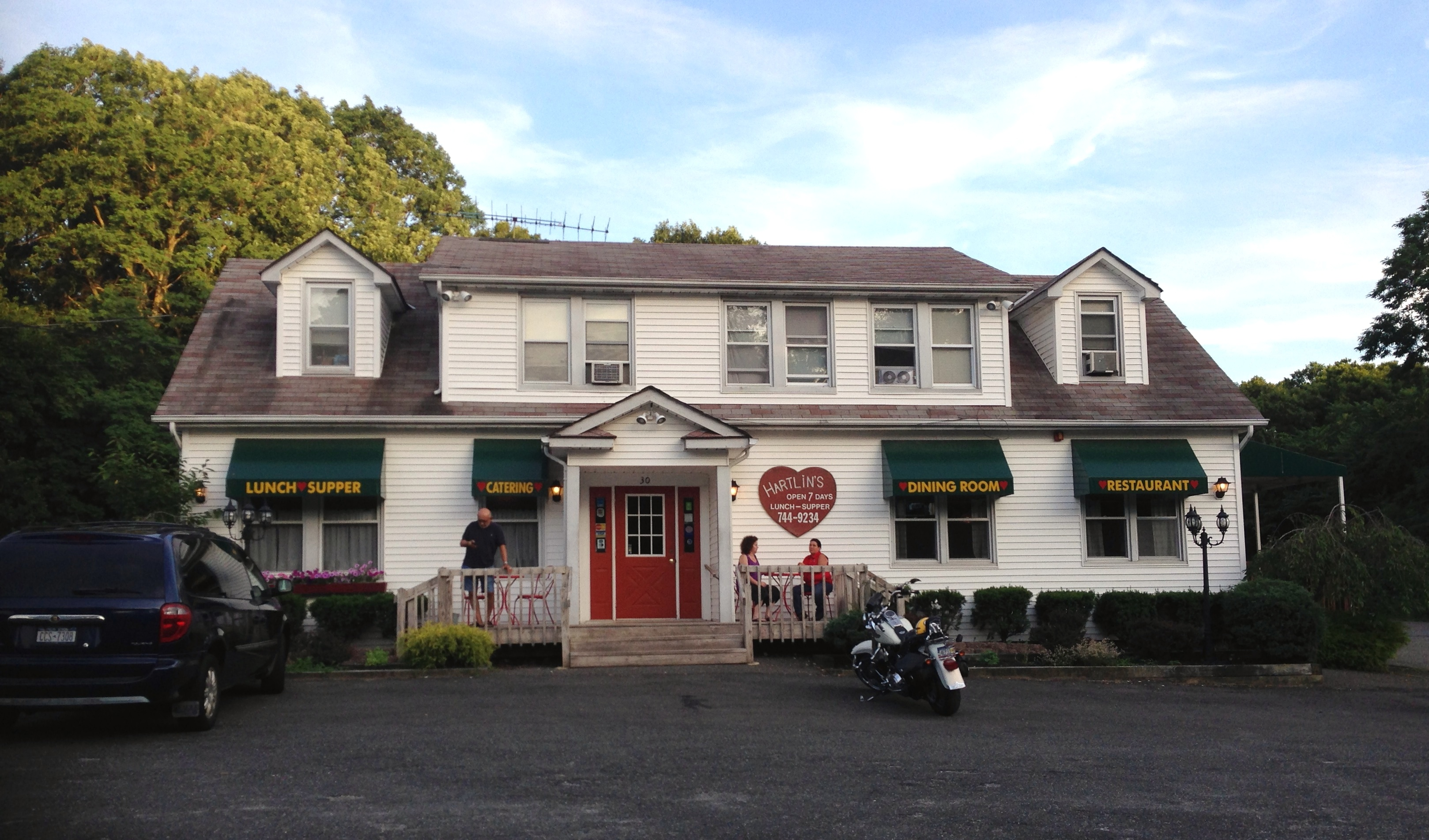
- The Hartlin Inn has held a neighborhood fixture as restaurant and bar for most of Sound Beach's history

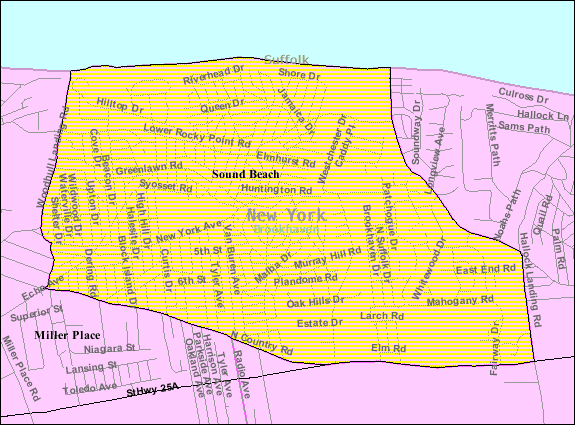

- Location within the state of New York
- Coordinates: 40°57′25″N 72°58′15″W
- Country: United States
- State: New York
- County: Suffolk

Area
  - Total: 2.56 sq mi (6.62 km^{2})
  - Land: 1.64 sq mi (4.24 km^{2})
  - Water: 0.92 sq mi (2.38 km^{2})
- Elevation: 177 ft (54 m)

Population (2020)
  - Total: 7,416
  - Density: 4,531.2/sq mi (1,749.51/km^{2})
- Time zone: UTC-5 (Eastern (EST))
  - Summer (DST): UTC-4 (EDT)
- ZIP code: 11789
- Area code: 631
- FIPS code: 36-68374
- GNIS feature ID: 0965650

Sound Beach, established in 1929, is a hamlet and census-designated place (CDP) in the north part of the Town of Brookhaven in Suffolk County, New York, United States. As of the 2020 census, Sound Beach had a population of 7,416.

== Geography ==
Sound Beach is located at 40°57′25″N 72°58′15″W (40.956986, -72.970765). It is bordered on the north by Long Island Sound, by Rocky Point to the east, and Miller Place to the west.

According to the United States Census Bureau, the CDP has a total area of 1.6 square miles (4.2 km^{2}), all land.

Historical population
Census	Pop.	Note	%±
2020	7,416		—
U.S. Decennial Census

== Demographics ==
As of the census of 2000, there were 9,807 people, 3,358 households, and 2,612 families residing in the CDP. The population density was 3,691.1 inhabitants per square mile (1,425.1/km^{2}). There were 3,640 housing units at an average density of 1,370.0 per square mile (529.0/km^{2}). The racial makeup of the CDP was 96.22% White, 0.63% African American, 0.14% Native American, 1.19% Asian, 0.07% Pacific Islander, 0.69% from other races, and 1.05% from two or more races. Hispanic or Latino of any race were 3.48% of the population.

There were 3,358 households, out of which 42.0% had children under the age of 18 living with them, 62.0% were married couples living together, 11.4% had a female householder with no husband present, and 22.2% were non-families. 16.7% of all households were made up of individuals, and 5.2% had someone living alone who was 65 years of age or older. The average household size was 2.91 and the average family size was 3.29.

In the CDP, the population was spread out, with 28.7% under the age of 18, 7.7% from 18 to 24, 33.7% from 25 to 44, 21.7% from 45 to 64, and 8.2% who were 65 years of age or older. The median age was 34 years. For every 100 females, there were 97.8 males. For every 100 females age 18 and over, there were 93.7 males.

The median income for a household in the CDP was $60,851, and the median income for a family was $66,018. Males had a median income of $47,079 versus $28,142 for females. The per capita income for the CDP was $22,550. About 5.0% of families and 6.9% of the population were below the poverty line, including 9.5% of those under age 18 and 2.9% of those age 65 or over.

== Education ==
Residents attend school in either the Rocky Point Union Free School District or the Miller Place Union Free School District. Residents in the eastern two-thirds attend Rocky Point and the western third attends Miller Place.

== Community ==
Sound Beach Boulevard, Echo Avenue, New York Avenue, and Lower Rocky Point Road are the main thoroughfares. The heart of this small beach hamlet's downtown district is known as "The Square", and can be found where Sound Beach Boulevard and New York Avenue meet. The local volunteer fire department sits near the square on Sound Beach Boulevard. The Sound Beach Property Owners Association private family-friendly beach access, parklands and clubhouse are within walking distance.

== Beaches ==
The beaches along the coast of Long Island Sound are constantly endangered by harsh winter storms. Many of the stairs leading down from the bluffs to the shore have had to be rebuilt several times. The Sound Beach Property Owners Association (SBPOA) offers these to residents of the town for access to the beaches. Passes are required year round. The terrain of the beaches is sandy on and near the cliffs and gradually becomes rockier along the immediate shoreline. Many small fish and other small aquatic animals live in the waters of the area.
