= Rocky Point, New York =

- Hamlet and census-designated place
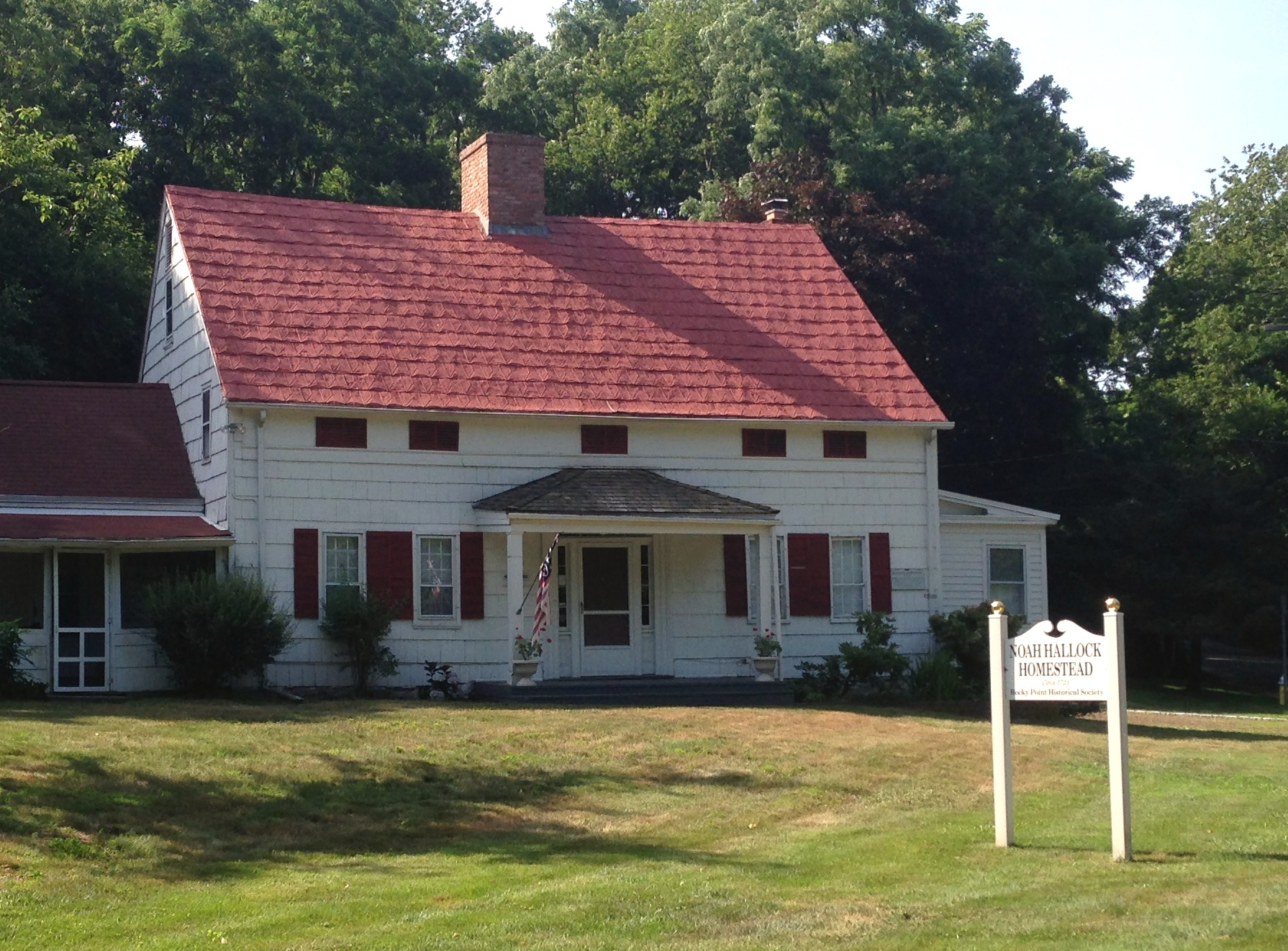
- The c. 1721 Noah Hallock homestead, the oldest extant structure in Rocky Point

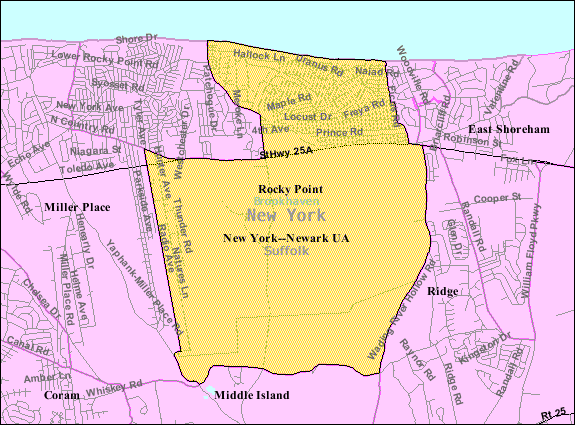
- U.S. Census map

- Location within the state of New York Rocky Point (New York)
- Coordinates: 40°57′13″N 72°55′38″W
- Country: United States
- State: New York
- County: Suffolk
- Town: Brookhaven

Area
  - Total: 12.65 sq mi (32.77 km^{2})
  - Land: 11.32 sq mi (29.32 km^{2})
  - Water: 1.33 sq mi (3.45 km^{2})
- Elevation: 194 ft (59 m)

Population (2020)
  - Total: 13,633
  - Density: 1,200/sq mi (465/km^{2})
- Time zone: UTC−05:00 (Eastern Time Zone)
  - Summer (DST): UTC−04:00
- ZIP Code: 11778
- Area codes: 631, 934
- FIPS code: 36-63319
- GNIS feature ID: 0962792

Rocky Point is a hamlet and census-designated place (CDP) in the town of Brookhaven, New York, United States. As of the 2020 census, Rocky Point had a population of 13,633.

== History ==
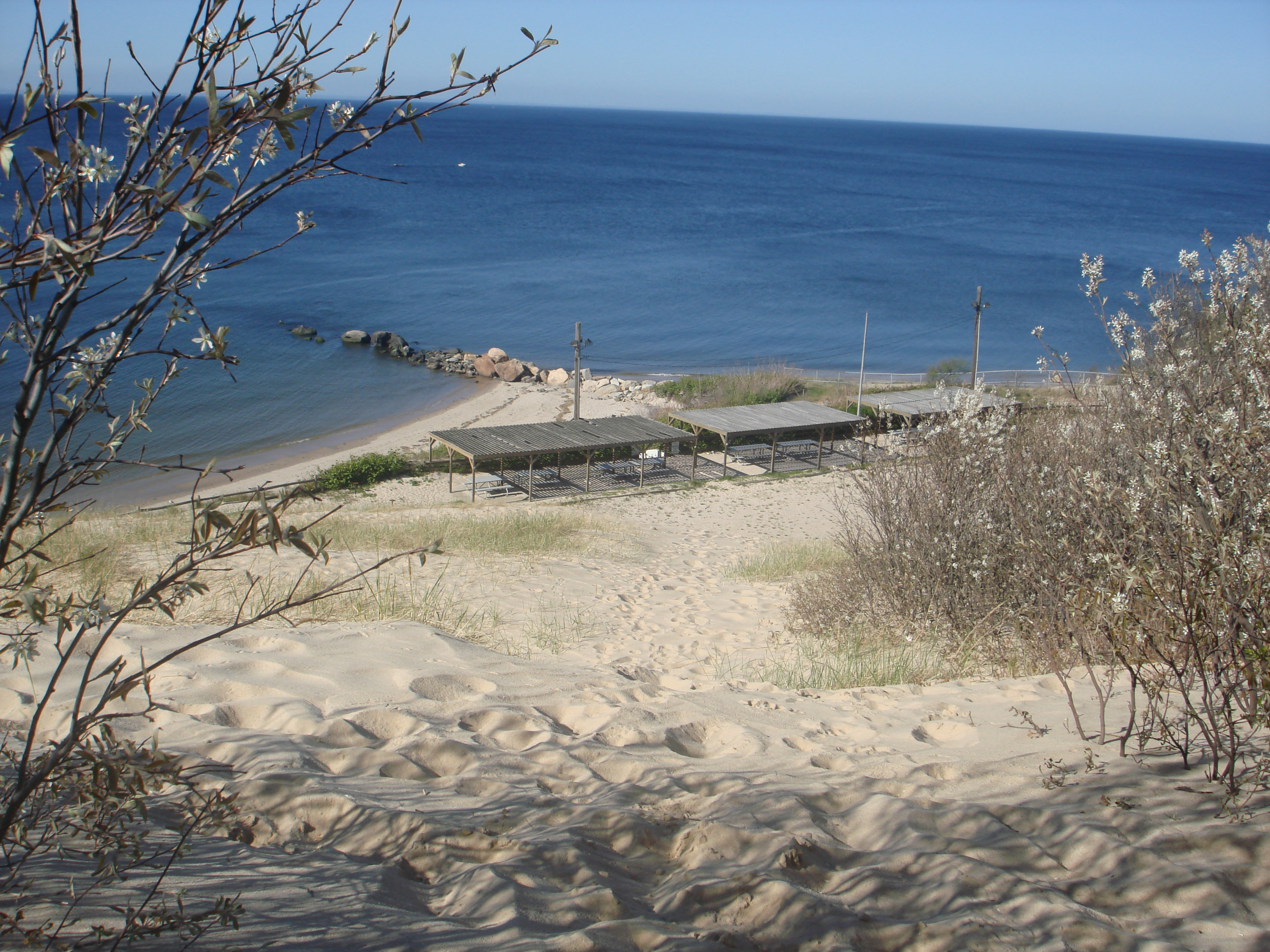
Rocky Point Landing

Rocky Point is home to the site where American radio company RCA once operated a large transmitting and transmitter research facility, known as Radio Central. RCA began to transmit transatlantic radio messages from Radio Central over longwave after its opening on November 5, 1921.

On January 7, 1927, AT&T initiated the first transatlantic commercial telephone service, linking London and New York. AT&T's transmitter was at Radio Central, and their receiver was in Houlton, Maine. The radiotelephone signal from Radio Central was received by the British General Post Office’s receiver facility in Cupar, Scotland.

The 5,200-acre (21 km^{2}) Rocky Point site was decommissioned in 1978 and demolished in the 1980s. It now consists of many concrete ruins and downed telephone poles and radio towers, owned by the New York State Department of Environmental Conservation. It is part of the Rocky Point Pine Barrens State Forest, which is in the Long Island Central Pine Barrens. The site gives an interesting insight into the 1920s, because—being in the middle of the forest—the footprints of the site remain largely untouched since its operational period. The western terminus of the 125-mile-long (201 km) Paumanok Path hiking trail is in the forest, with the eastern terminus at the Montauk Point Light.

The hamlet was also served by a station of the Long Island Rail Road, located just east of Broadway between Prince Road and King Road. The station was opened in 1895, with service heading east to Wading River and west to Port Jefferson and New York City. The station was abandoned in 1938, with a replica of the station, containing a Veterans of Foreign Wars (VFW) museum, standing on the site today.

== Geography ==
The community is on the North Shore of Long Island. According to the United States Census Bureau, the CDP has a total area of 11.3 square miles (29.3 km^{2}), all land.

Historical population
| Census | Pop. | Note | %± |
|---|---|---|---|
| 2000 | 10,185 | | — |
| 2010 | 14,014 | | 37.6% |
| 2020 | 13,633 | | −2.7% |
U.S. Decennial Census

== Demographics ==
=== 2020 census ===
As of the 2020 census, Rocky Point had a population of 13,633. The median age was 40.0 years. 22.5% of residents were under the age of 18 and 13.2% of residents were 65 years of age or older. For every 100 females there were 95.4 males, and for every 100 females age 18 and over there were 94.7 males age 18 and over.

97.4% of residents lived in urban areas, while 2.6% lived in rural areas.

There were 4,826 households in Rocky Point, of which 34.4% had children under the age of 18 living in them. Of all households, 55.7% were married-couple households, 15.2% were households with a male householder and no spouse or partner present, and 22.5% were households with a female householder and no spouse or partner present. About 20.3% of all households were made up of individuals and 8.3% had someone living alone who was 65 years of age or older.

There were 5,285 housing units, of which 8.7% were vacant. The homeowner vacancy rate was 2.0% and the rental vacancy rate was 6.0%.

Racial composition as of the 2020 census
| Race | Number | Percent |
|---|---|---|
| White | 11,548 | 84.7% |
| Black or African American | 191 | 1.4% |
| American Indian and Alaska Native | 19 | 0.1% |
| Asian | 242 | 1.8% |
| Native Hawaiian and Other Pacific Islander | 3 | 0.0% |
| Some other race | 544 | 4.0% |
| Two or more races | 1,086 | 8.0% |
| Hispanic or Latino (of any race) | 1,651 | 12.1% |

=== 2010 census ===
As of the census of 2010, there were 14,014 people, 4,820 households, and 3,615 families residing in the CDP. The population density was 1,240.2 inhabitants per square mile (478.8/km^{2}). There were 5,366 housing units at an average density of 474.9 per square mile (183.4/km^{2}). The racial makeup of the CDP was 93.7% White, 1.5% Black or African American, 0.1% Native American, 1.6% Asian, 0.04% Pacific Islander, 1.6% some other race, and 1.4% from two or more races. Hispanic or Latino of any race were 7.0% of the population.

There were 4,820 households, out of which 42.7% had children under the age of 18 living with them, 57.9% were headed by married couples living together, 11.8% had a female householder with no husband present, and 25.0% were non-families. 19.6% of all households were made up of individuals, and 5.7% were someone living alone who was 65 years of age or older. The average household size was 2.89, and the average family size was 3.34.

In the CDP, the population was spread out, with 27.2% under the age of 18, 8.1% from 18 to 24, 28.8% from 25 to 44, 27.2% from 45 to 64, and 8.8% who were 65 years of age or older. The median age was 36.8 years. For every 100 females, there were 98.7 males. For every 100 females age 18 and over, there were 98.0 males.

=== Income and poverty ===
For the period 2007–2011, the median annual income for a household in the CDP was $87,752, and the median income for a family was $99,304. Males had a median income of $66,103 versus $48,529 for females. The per capita income for the CDP was $33,183. About 3.6% of families and 5.6% of the population were below the poverty threshold, including 8.2% of those under age 18 and 1.6% of those age 65 or over.

== Notable people ==
- Danny Burawa (b. 1988), major league baseball pitcher for the New York Yankees and Atlanta Braves during the 2015 season
- John Wilson (b. 1986), filmmaker
