= Miller Place Union Free School District =

Public school district in New York, United States

Location
- Miller Place, Suffolk County, New York; United States

District information
- Motto: Empowering excellence today, developing tomorrow's, forever MP proud.
- Grades: K-12
- President: Lisa Reitan
- Superintendent: Seth A. Lipshie
- Schools: 4

Students and staff
- Students: 2,276
- District mascot: Panthers
- Colors: Red and blue

Other information
- District Offices: 7 Memorial Drive Miller Place, NY 11764
- Website: www.millerplace.k12.ny.us

Miller Place Union Free School District is a school district in the Town of Brookhaven in Suffolk County, New York. The district serves the vast majority of Miller Place and a large chunk of Sound Beach on the North Shore of Long Island.

== History ==
=== Early history ===
In 1813, the Town of Brookhaven created all of their school districts and established the number and location of all of them. The district was created as District #6 of Brookhaven Town, and was to take up what was then known as "Miller's Place" (the modern Miller Place) along with the Hopkins Settlement, which still stand today in Miller Place near the harbor in Mount Sinai. The first school in this district opened alongside it in 1813. Another one of the very first schools in Miller Place was the Miller Place Academy. It was opened in 1834 and is today a library. It is on North Country Road in Miller Place, where two schools in the modern school district stand today (North Country Road Middle School and Laddie A. Decker Sound Beach School). It closed in 1868, before opening again in 1894 as a public school to replace the very first school. It has been the Miller Place Free Library since 1938.

=== Recent history ===
The district really started to pick up steam in the 1960s and early 1970s, with all of today's schools in the district except for North Country Road Middle School (which opened in 1937) were opened in this time period. The district was even able to have enough students to warrant its first high school in 1972. Miller Place High School graduated its first class in 1975.

== Schools ==
The following is a table of the schools in the Miller Place Union Free School District.

| School name | Type of school | Address | Grades | Principal |
|---|---|---|---|---|
| Miller Place High School | High School | 15 Memorial Drive Miller Place, NY 11764 | 9-12 | Kevin Slavin |
| North Country Road Middle School | Middle School | 191 North Country Road Miller Place, NY 11764 | 6-8 | Christine Mangiamele |
| Laddie A. Decker Sound Beach School | Intermediate School | 197 North Country Road Miller Place, NY 11764 | 3-5 | Jean Marie D'Aversa |
| Andrew Muller Primary School | Elementary School | 65 Lower Rocky Point Road Miller Place, NY 11764 | K-2 | Laura Gewurz |
