= Shoreham station (LIRR) =

Former train station in New York, US

Shoreham
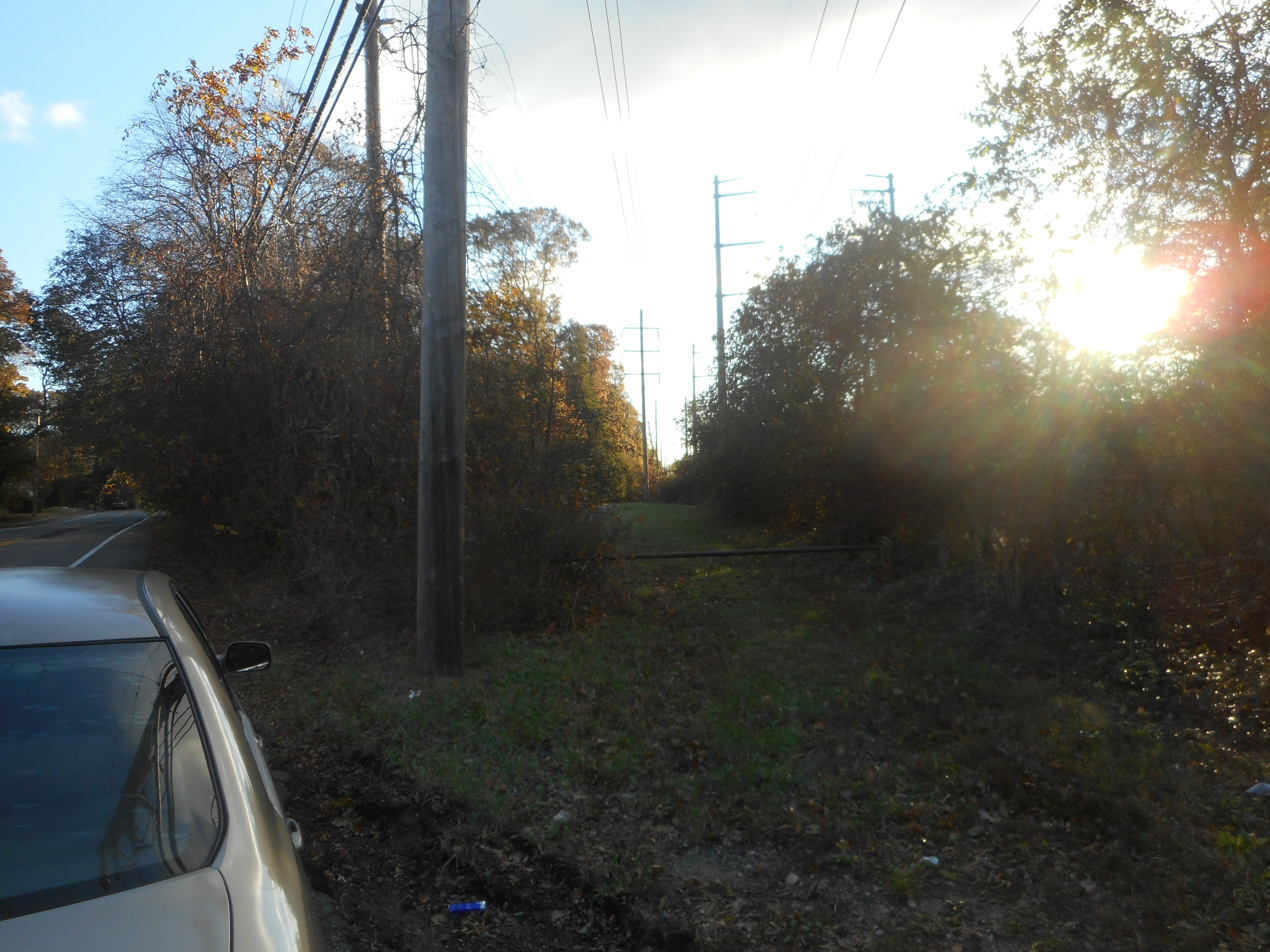
- Access road to a PSE&G Long Island power line that also leads to the site of the former station

General information
- Location: North Country Road and Randall Road; Shoreham, New York
- Coordinates: 40°56′57.6″N 72°53′58.3″W
- Line: Wading River Branch

History
- Opened: 1900
- Closed: 1938
- Former names: Wardenclyffe (1900–1910)

Former services
Preceding station	Long Island Rail Road	Following station
Rocky Point toward Hicksville	Wading River Branch	Wading River Terminus
Location

Shoreham was a station on the Wading River Extension on the Port Jefferson Branch of the Long Island Rail Road. This is an abandoned station just east of the intersection of North Country Road and Randall Road, along what is now access for Long Island Power Authority power lines.

== History ==
The Wardenclyffe station was originally built in 1900 in close proximity to Nikola Tesla's wireless transmission station Wardenclyffe Tower. The station was built during the extension of the Port Jefferson Branch to Wading River, which was once slated to continue eastward and rejoin the Main Line at either Riverhead or Calverton. In 1910, the station's name was changed to Shoreham.

The line east of Port Jefferson was abandoned in 1938 and the station was torn down in 1950. The right-of-way is now owned by the Long Island Power Authority and used for power lines, but there are plans to create a rail trail for bicycling, running, and walking.
