= Miller Place Historic District =

Historic district in New York, United States

- U.S. National Register of Historic Places
- U.S. Historic district
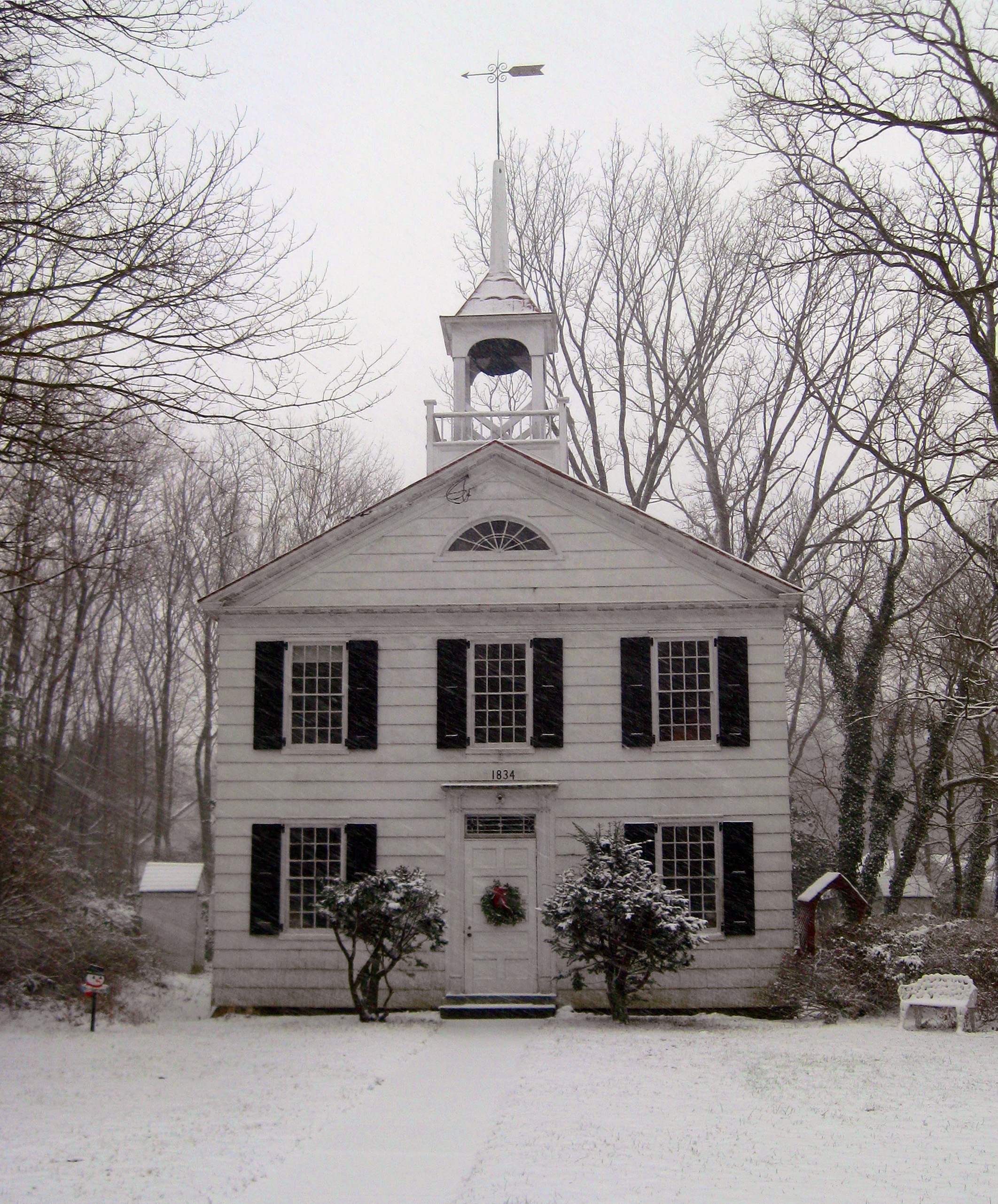
- Miller Place Academy, December 2008

- Location within New York Location within the United States
- Location: N. Country Rd., Miller Place, New York
- Coordinates: 40°57′30″N 72°59′56″W
- Area: 12.5 acres (5.1 ha)
- Architectural style: Greek Revival, Federal
- NRHP reference No.: 76001281
- Added to NRHP: June 17, 1976

Miller Place Historic District is a national historic district located at Miller Place in Suffolk County, New York. The district contains 27 contributing buildings. It encompasses a concentration of the rural vernacular architecture characteristic of Long Island from the mid-18th through late 19th century. They are largely 1- to 2 1/2-story, wood-frame dwellings sheathed in clapboard or wood shingles. Also included is the Miller Place Academy building.

The Historic District spans from the William Miller Homestead on North Country Road (CR 20) at the west end, to just beyond the Vassilaros house, then turns northeast along Lower Rocky Point Road until it reaches Gully Landing Road to the east end. It was added to the National Register of Historic Places in 1976 and was the first national historic district in the Town of Brookhaven.

== Gallery ==
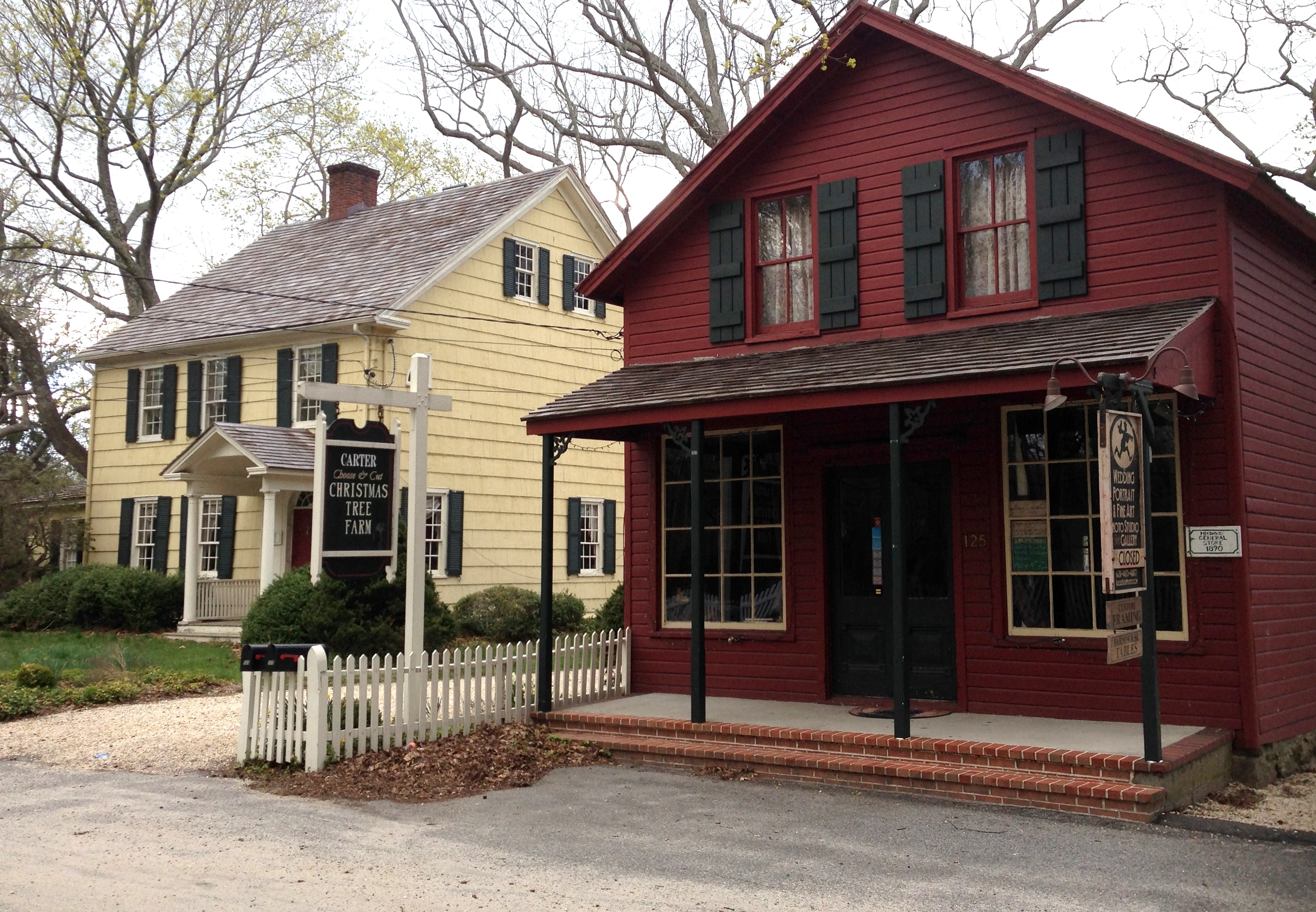
The Miller Place Country General Store.

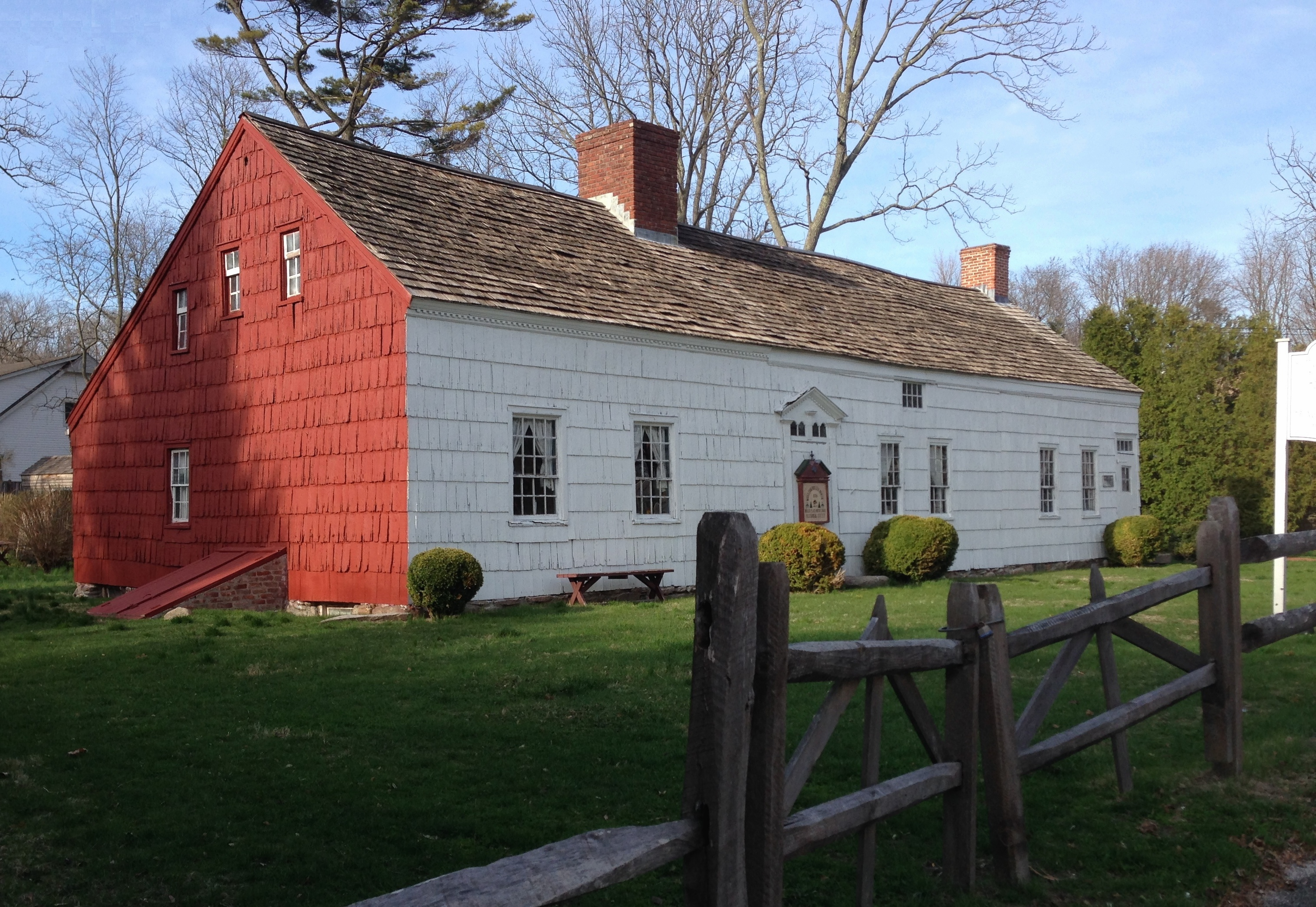
The historic William Miller Homestead, now home to the Miller Place-Mount Sinai Historical Society.

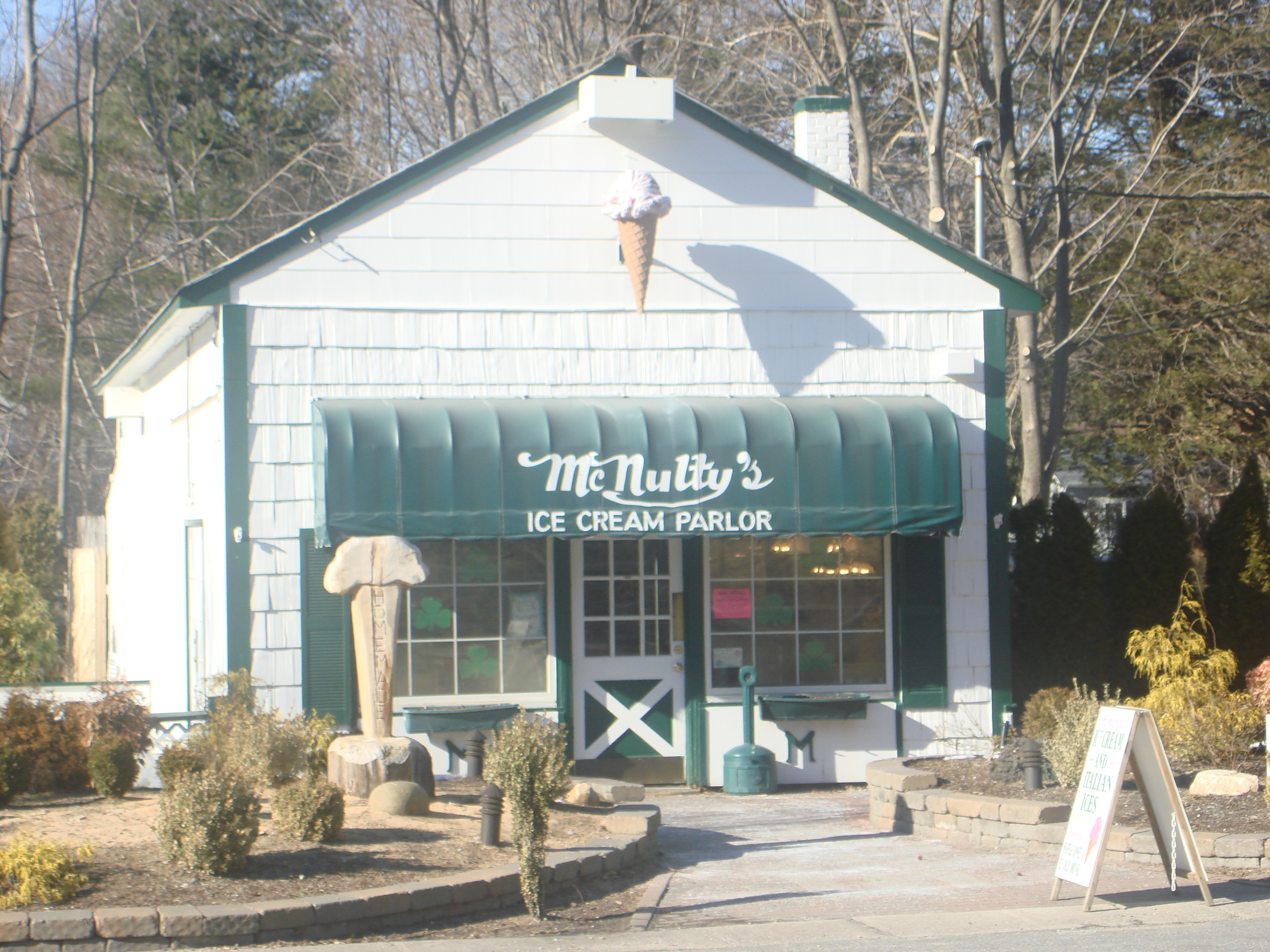
McNulty's Ice Cream Parlor is also part of the district.

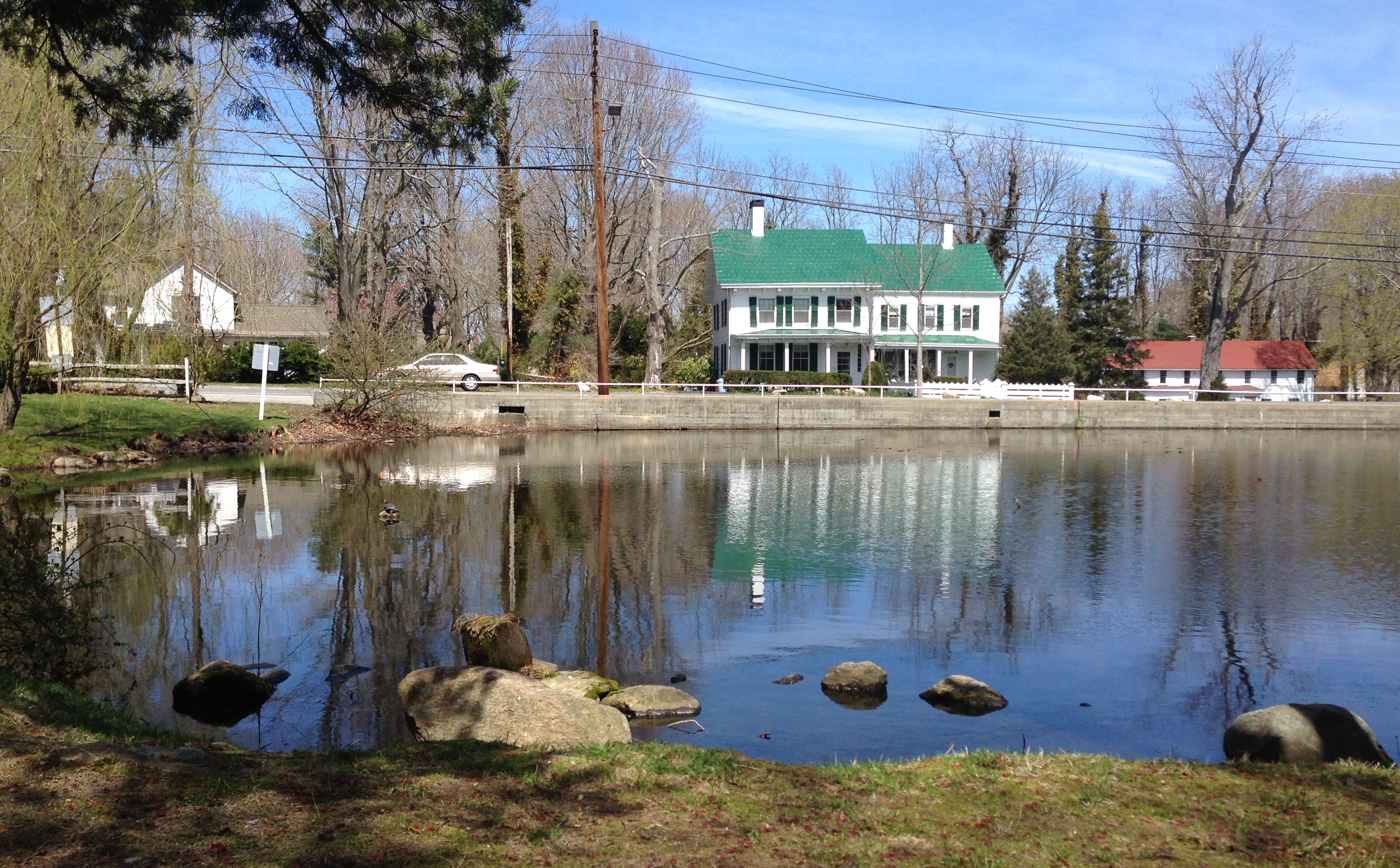
The John Woodhull House across from the Miller Place Duck Pond.
