= Sam Hopkins (artist) =

- Born: 1979 (age 46–47); Rome
- Occupation: Artist Researcher

Sam Hopkins (born 1979 in Rome) is an artist whose work is rooted in Kenya. His practice is characterised by modes of working together, such as collaboration, participation and co-production. Hopkins’ artworks, which tend to be project-based and involve people as the medium and the material of the work, can be described as Social Practice. In 2014, he was named one of the leading 100 Global Thinkers by Foreign Policy Magazine.

== Life ==
Hopkins was raised in Britain and Kenya and holds degrees from the University of Edinburgh (MA), Oxford Brookes University (MA) and the University of the Arts London (PhD). He currently works as an Artist Researcher at the Academy of Media Arts in Cologne.

== Selected works ==
- Slum TV (2007 – ongoing) – In 2007 Hopkins co-initiated Slum TV, together with Julius Mwelu, Fred Otieno, Alex Nikolic and Lukas Pusch. Slum TV is a participatory media organisation that trains young men and women in the neighbourhood of Mathare in digital image production. Slum TV members research, film and edit stories from the community, which are then shown in local public screenings.
- Logos of Non Profit Organisations working in Kenya (some of which are imaginary) (2010–14) – is an installation of 24 individual, silk-screen prints which displays a mixture of real and imaginary logos of Non-governmental organizations (NGOs) that work in Kenya. The work opens up questions about the ‘NGO aesthetic’, the manner in which humanitarian organisations represent themselves.
- Mashup the Archive (2013–15) was a 2 year research project dedicated to activating the archive of African art of the Iwalewahaus. Hopkins and co-curator Dr. Nadine Siegert invited 10 artists-in residence from the African continent and the diaspora to re-imagine and remix the African art of the collection. With Mashup, the final exhibition of the research project, the Iwalewahaus reopened to the public.
- Letter to Lagat (2015) (with Simon Rittmeier) – is an artist book which investigates the agency of objects in Postcolonial collections of the Global North. Hopkins and Rittmeier sift through the traces that museum objects have left behind after the fictive disappearance of a collection of African art from a European museum.
- The Bike Gang (2015–19) (with John Kamicha) is a project about bicycles and belonging in Nairobi. Hopkins and Kamicha employ strategies of collaborative filmmaking to portray an idiosyncratic bicycle subculture that complicates dominant narratives about fixed Kenyan identities.
- The Qilin (2017–19) (with David Lalé) – is a research and film project that explores the world of African traders living and working in Guangzhou. The project resulted in several artistic outcomes. GZ Calling (2017) is a 3-channel video installation that explores the labyrinthine wholesale markets of Guangzhou. The Qilin (2019) is an animated documentary about African businessmen working in Guangzhou.
- Die Dauercamperin (2019) (with Jens Mühlhoff) is an installation that combines dramatised audio fragments and stage design to celebrate the fictional offline community DEZENT. The work explores the agency of the individual and the notion of independence in a networked world

== Selected writings ==
- 2011. Hopkins, Sam and Johannes Hossfeld. Sam Hopkins: Contact Zones (vol 2). Nairobi: Native Intelligence. ISBN 978-9966-1553-1-3
- 2012. Hopkins, Sam and Vincenzo Cavallo, “Ghosts that Provoke Violence” in Heidenreich_Seleme, Lien and Sean O'Toole (eds), Ueber(W)unden: Art in Troubled Times. ISBN 978-1431404971
- 2015. Hopkins, Sam. Maasai Mbili: Contact Zones (vol 13). Nairobi: Native Intelligence. ISBN 978-9966-071-05-7
- 2015. Hopkins, Sam and Simon Rittmeier. Letter to Lagat, Cologne: Strzelecki Books. ISBN 978-3-942680-72-1
- 2017. Hopkins, Sam and Nadine Siegert (eds), MASHUP The Archive, Berlin: Revolver Books ISBN 978-3-95763-398-9

== Selected exhibitions ==
- Nairobi: A State of Mind (2012)
- Dakar Biennale (2014) (20)
- Guess who’s coming to dinner (2015)
- Post African Futures (2015)
- Lagos Biennale (2017)
- Precariat’s Meeting (2017)
- Urbane Kunst Ruhr (2019)

== Bibliography ==
- Bajorek, Jennifer. 'Beyond the “NGO Aesthetic”' Social Text (2016) 34 (2 (127)): 89–107.
- Vierke, Ulf. 'Archive, Art and Anarchy: From the Topological Archive to the Anarchic Archive', African Arts. (2016) 48 (2): 12–25
