= Port Jefferson station =

Long Island Rail Road station in Suffolk County, New York

Port Jefferson
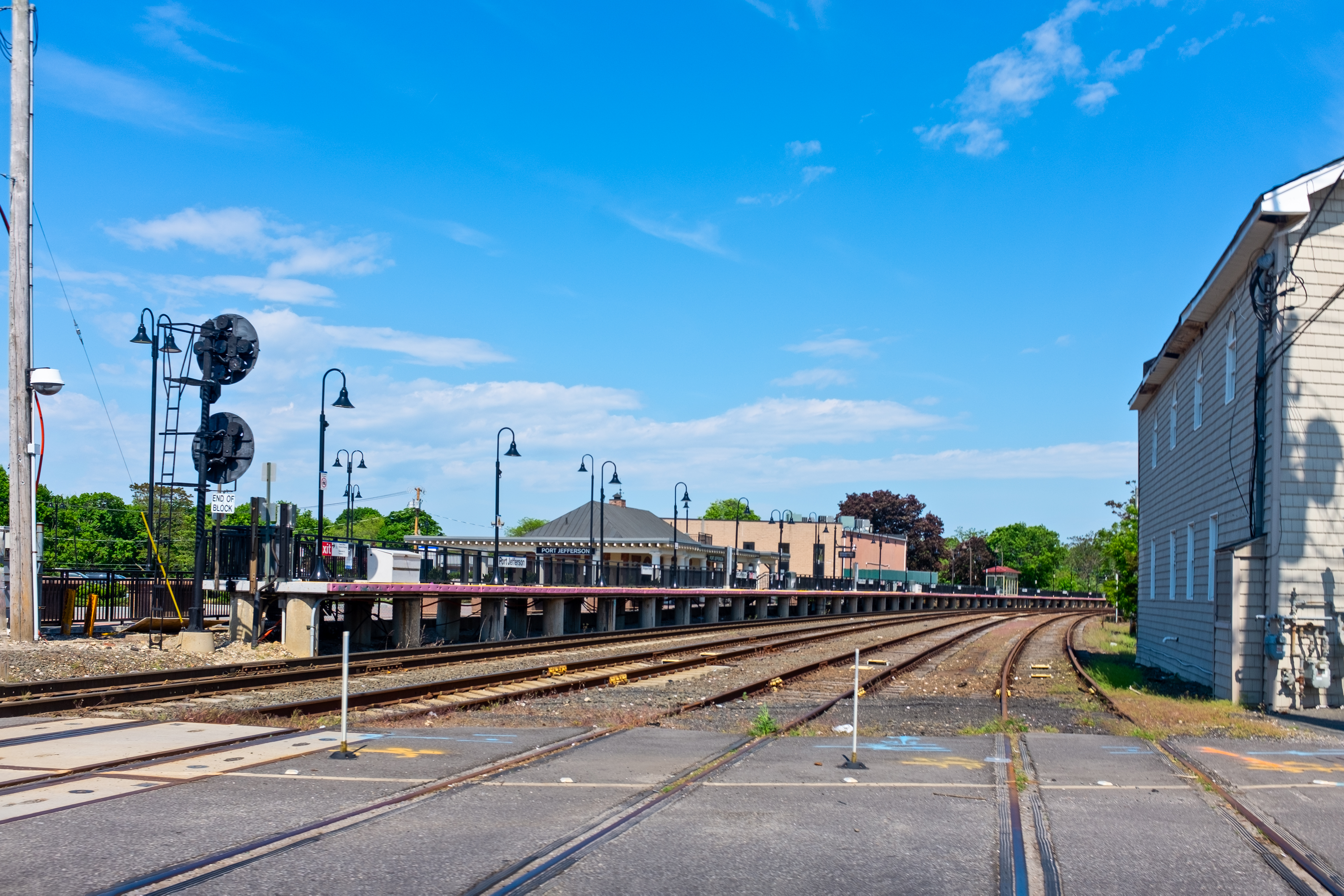
- Port Jefferson station in 2021

General information
- Location: Main Street and Oakland Avenue; Port Jefferson Station, New York
- Coordinates: 40°56′4.99″N 73°3′13.29″W
- Owner: Long Island Rail Road
- Platforms: 1 side platform
- Tracks: 4
- Connections: Suffolk County Transit: 51, 62; Port Jeff Jitney Buses

Construction
- Parking: Yes
- Cycle facilities: Yes
- Accessible: Yes

Other information
- Station code: PJN
- Fare zone: 10

History
- Opened: January 13, 1873
- Rebuilt: 1875, 1903, 1968, 2001, 2019

Passengers
- 2012—2014: 1,375 per weekday

Services
Preceding station	Long Island Rail Road	Following station
Stony Brook toward Penn Station or Long Island City	Port Jefferson Branch diesel service	Terminus
Former services
Preceding station	Long Island Rail Road	Following station
Setauket toward Hicksville	Wading River Branch	Miller Place toward Wading River
Location

Port Jefferson is the terminus for the Port Jefferson Branch of the Long Island Rail Road in Port Jefferson Station, New York, named for the nearby village of Port Jefferson. The station is located on New York State Route 25A (Main Street), on the north side of the tracks, but is also accessible from Oakland Avenue, as well as Railroad Avenue and Union Street on the south side of the tracks. All service is diesel-only, and most off-peak trains are shuttles requiring a transfer to an electric train at Huntington.

The station also serves Suffolk County Transit buses and occasionally the Village of Port Jefferson's own local jitney buses. One Suffolk County Transit bus, Route 51, leads to the Bridgeport & Port Jefferson Ferry, approximately one mile to the north. It features service to Bridgeport, Connecticut, hence the reason for some station name signs being adjacent to "Bridgeport Ferries" signs.

== History ==
Port Jefferson station was originally opened on January 13, 1873 by the Smithtown and Port Jefferson Railroad, but was burned on February 1, 1874. The second station was completed in June 1875. In 1895, the Port Jefferson Branch was extended to Wading River. The second Port Jefferson station was closed in 1903, and was used as a yard building, while the third station was built across Main Street. Designed by Petit & Green and funded by the residents of the nearby Village of Belle Terre, it opened on July 29, 1903. Port Jefferson Station resumed its status as the terminus of the line on October 9, 1938, when the line was abandoned between Port Jefferson and Wading River. The "yard building" was abandoned in April 1963. The station was remodeled in 1968, but restored in 2001 based on its previous 1903 design. Port Jefferson is 59.4 miles (95.6 km) from Penn Station and travel time varies between 1 hour, 40 minutes and 2 hours, depending on if one has to transfer to an electric train to reach the city.

In 2019, the LIRR completed an extensive renovation of the station building, restoring it to its prototypical appearance at the turn of the twentieth century. New signage, station artwork, and brick-paver walkways were also installed. In June 2022 a rail trail for bicycling, running, and walking was built east of the station.

== Station layout ==
This station has one 10-car-long high-level side platform north of the tracks. To the east of the station is the Port Jefferson Yard, which provides additional storage tracks.

== Gallery ==
Port Jefferson LIRR station

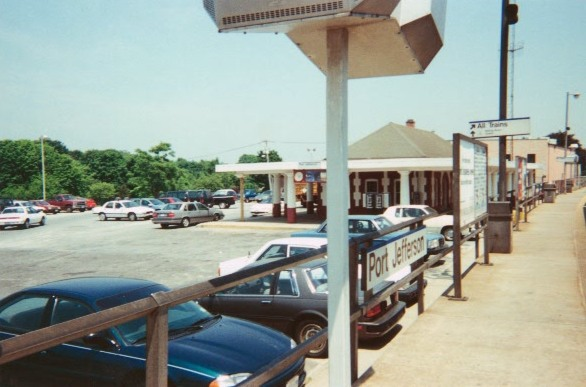
Parking lot and station building, as seen in 1999.

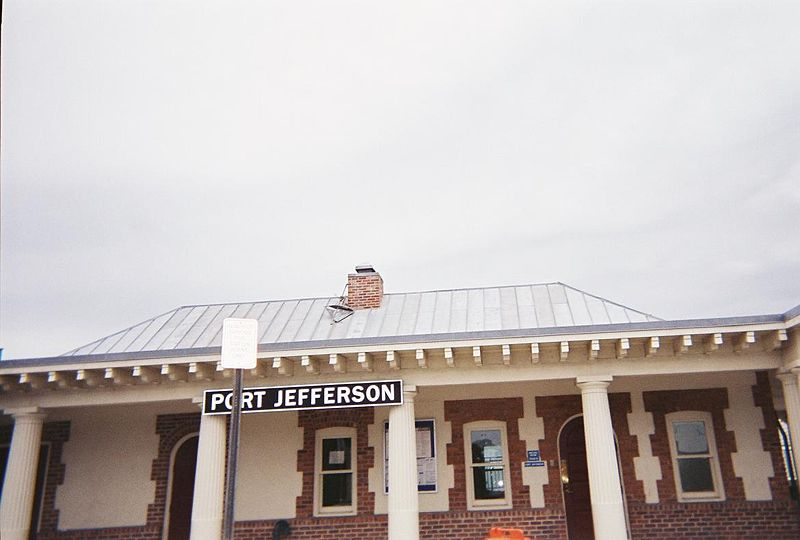
2007 image of station after the 2001 restoration project.

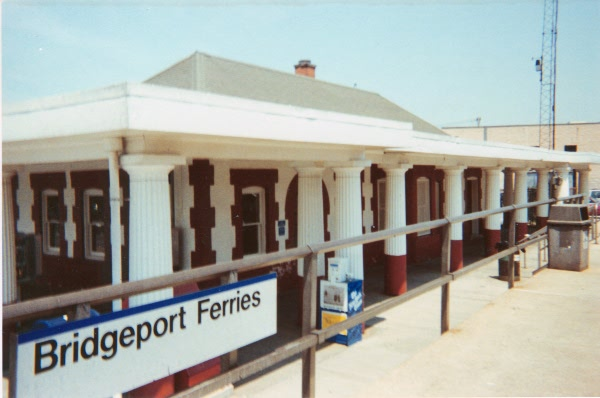
One of the signs at the station to complement the station name sign, showing the connection to the ferry to Bridgeport.
