= Miller Place High School =

Coordinates: 40°56′03″N 72°59′25″W

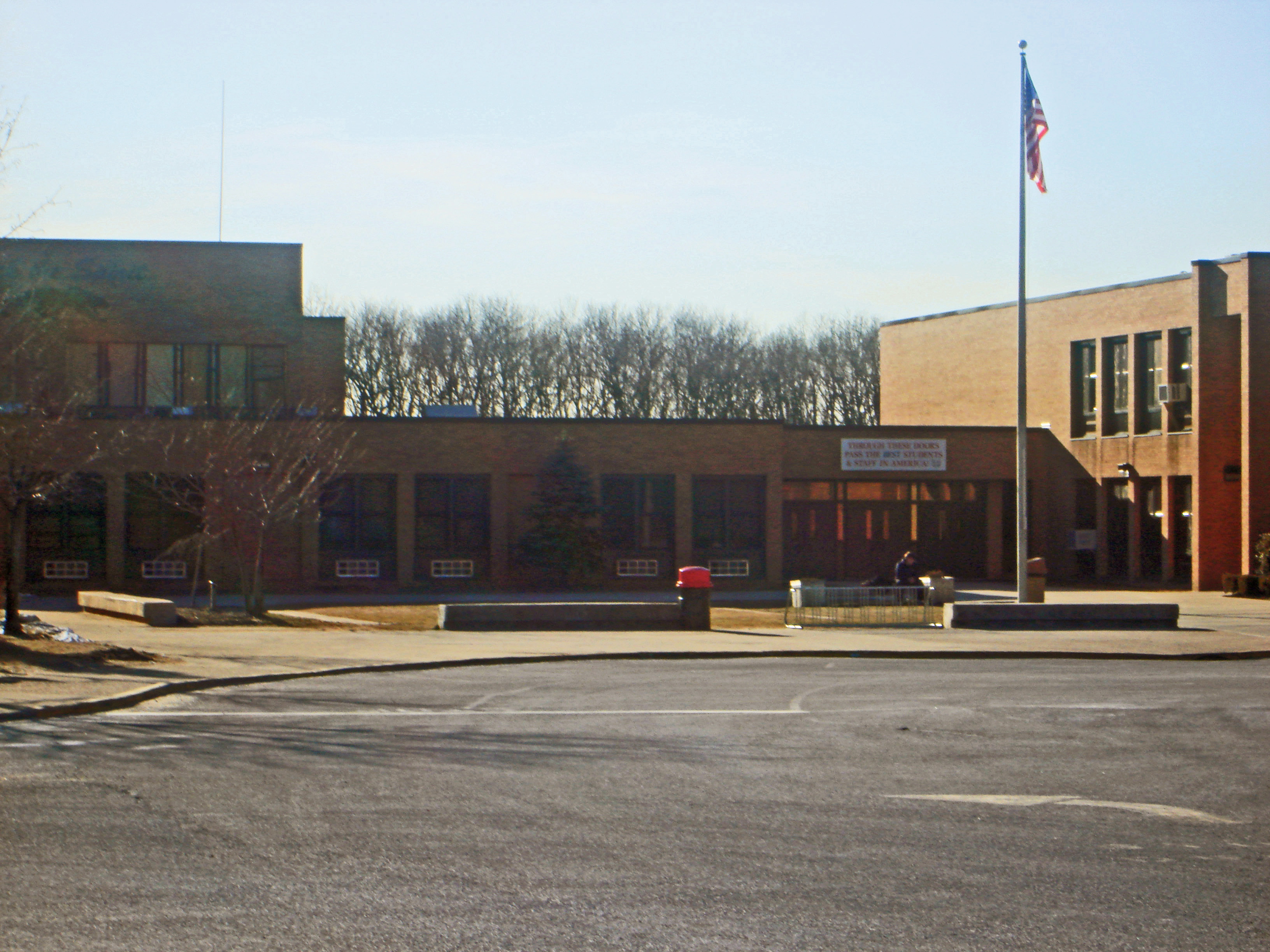

Location
- 15 Memorial Dr; Miller Place, New York 11764; United States

Information
- Type: Public high school
- Motto: "Excellence and Beyond"
- Opened: 1972
- Principal: Kevin Slavin
- Teaching staff: 73.97 (on FTE basis)
- Grades: 9-12
- Enrollment: 803 (2023–2024)
- Student to teacher ratio: 10.86
- Colors: Red, blue and white
- Mascot: Panthers
- Yearbook: Dawning
- Website: http://www.millerplace.k12.ny.us

Miller Place High School is a public high school in the Miller Place Union Free School District along the north shore of Long Island, New York, United States. It is the district's only high school, supporting grades 9-12.

In the 2025-2026 school year, the school had a student-teacher ratio of 11:1, with 49% of students participating in Advanced Placement courses.

== Location ==
Miller Place High School is located in the hamlet of Miller Place, Suffolk County, New York. Unlike the three other district schools, it is located south of Rt. 25A. Miller Place High School is the only Miller Place Union Free School District building not on the original property.

== Sports ==
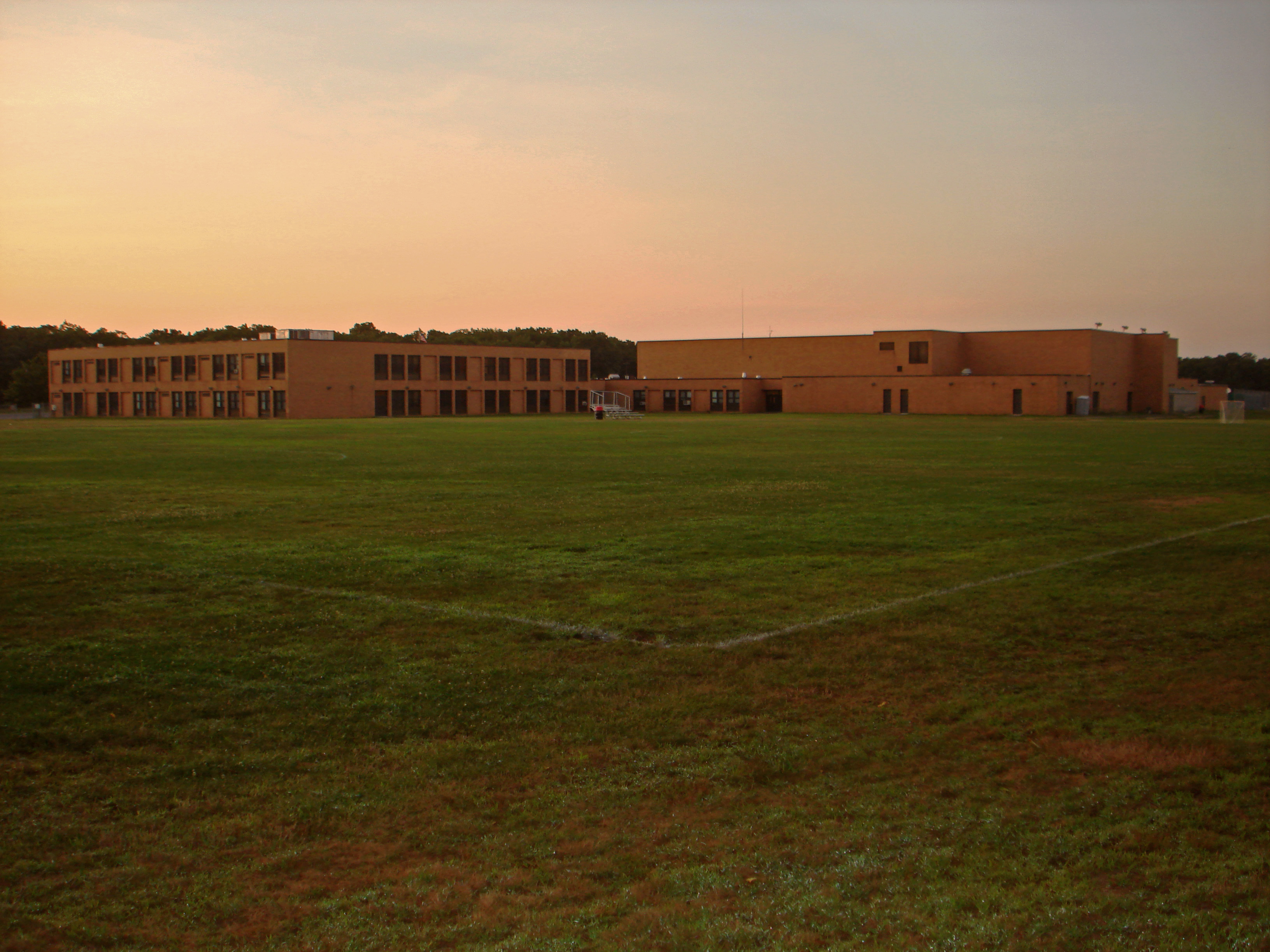
View of the school from its athletic fields

The Miller Place High School Panthers badminton team remained undefeated for 504 straight games from 1973 until April 2005, when they were defeated by Smithtown High School.

Among the 2021-22 school year sports are the following

Fall

- Spirit/Sideline Cheer
- Cross Country (Boys & Girls)
- Field Hockey
- Football
- Tennis (Girls)
- Volleyball (Girls)
- Soccer (Boys & Girls)
- Girls Gymnastics (Combined with William Floyd School District)
- Boys Golf (Combined with Comsewogue School District)

Winter

- Basketball (Boys & Girls)
- Competitive Cheer
- Winter/Indoor Track (Boys & Girls)
- Wrestling
- Fencing (Boys & Girls; Combined with Newfield High School)

Spring

- Badminton (Boys & Girls)
- Baseball (Boys)
- Lacrosse (Boys & Girls)
- Softball (Girls)
- Tennis (Boys)
- Track & Field (Boys & Girls)
