= Samuel Hopkins House =

Historic house in New York, United States

- U.S. National Register of Historic Places
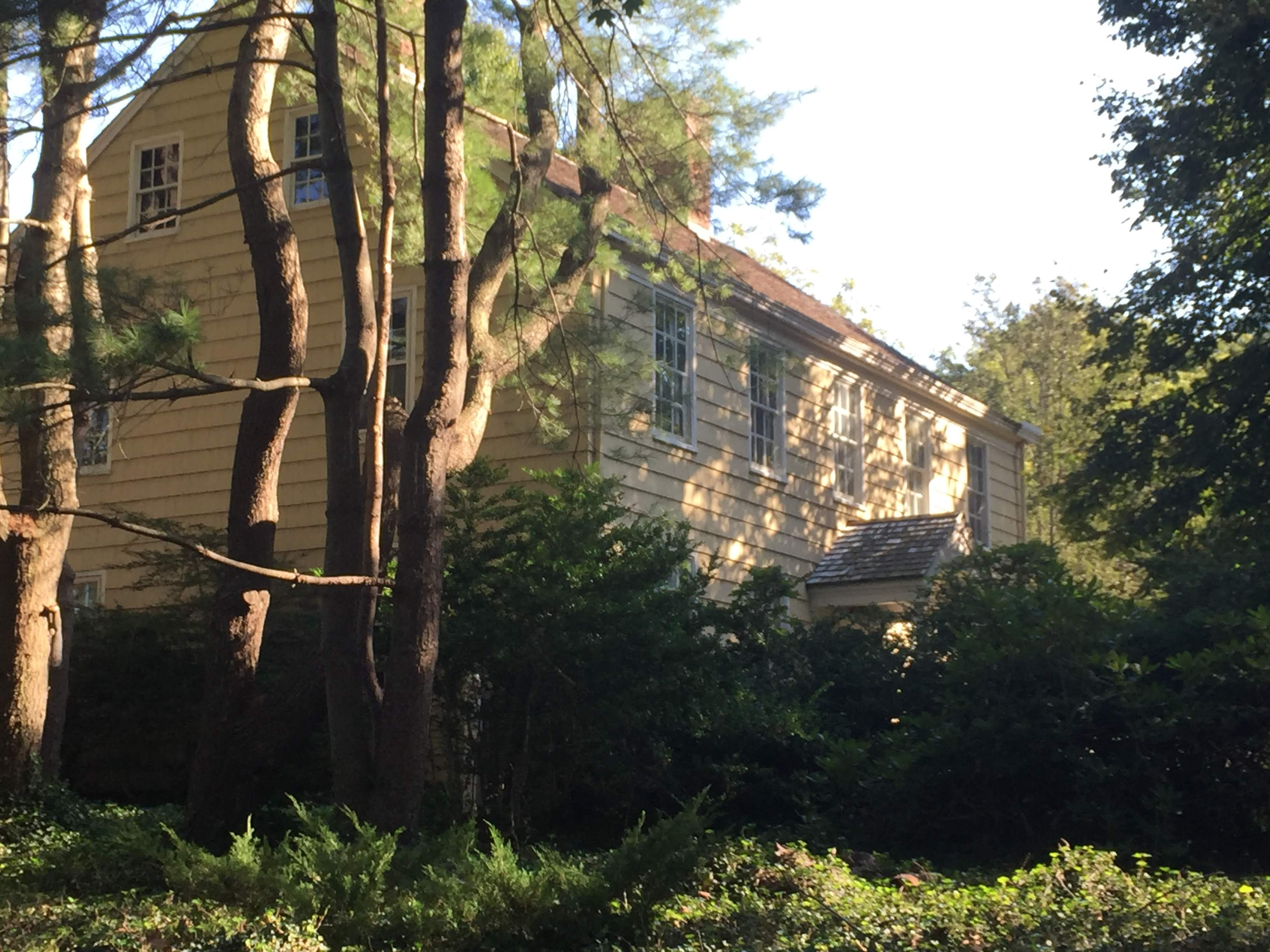
- Samuel Hopkins House, 2018

- Location within New York Location within the United States
- Location: 415 Pipe Stave Hollow Rd., Miller Place, New York
- Coordinates: 40°57′29.78″N 73°1′15.61″W
- Area: 2.16 acres (0.87 ha)
- Built: 1770
- Architectural style: Federal
- NRHP reference No.: 09000057
- Added to NRHP: February 26, 2009

Samuel Hopkins House is a historic home located at Miller Place in Suffolk County, New York. It is a 2 1/2-story frame residence with an earlier 1 1/2-story wing on the east side.

The main portion of the house was built about 1770 and remodeled in the Adam or Federal style in 1816.

It was added to the National Register of Historic Places in 2009.
