= Wading River station =

Former train station in New York, US

Wading River
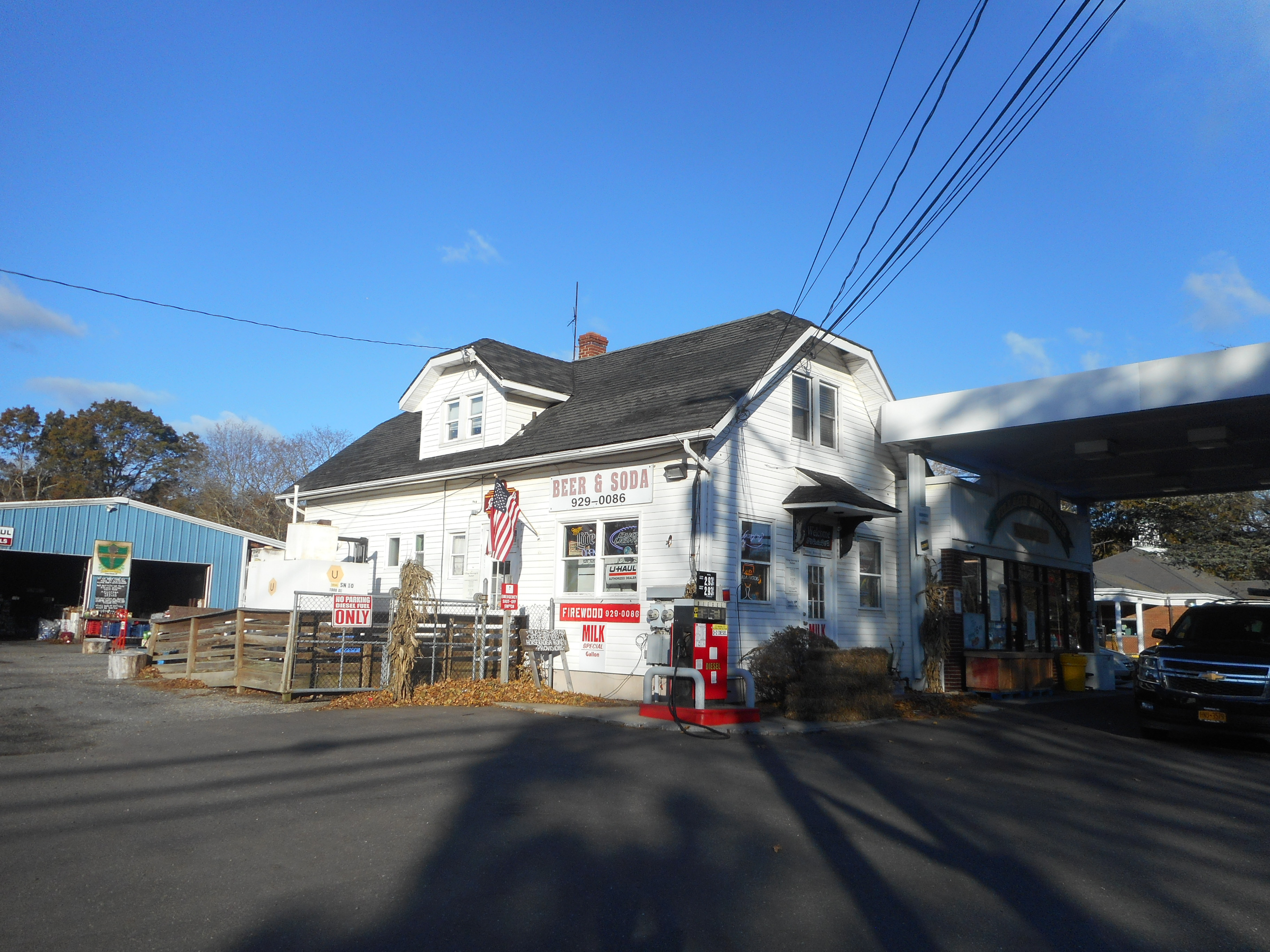
- A local country store and beverage distributor built with wood originally used at the site of the nearby Wading River LIRR station.

General information
- Location: Wading River–Manor Road; Wading River, New York
- Coordinates: 40.944638°N 72.842663°W
- Line: Wading River Branch

History
- Opened: June 27, 1895
- Closed: 1938

Former services
Preceding station	Long Island Rail Road	Following station
Shoreham toward Hicksville	Wading River Branch	Terminus
Location

Wading River was the terminus of the abandoned Wading River Extension on the Port Jefferson Branch of the Long Island Rail Road. This is an abandoned station just outside south of downtown Wading River, and was located on Wading River-Manor Road (former Suffolk CR 25) north of New York State Route 25A.

== History ==
Wading River station was originally built in 1895 during the extension of the Port Jefferson Branch to Wading River. It was once slated to continue eastward and rejoin the Main Line at either Riverhead or Calverton. Though neither of these proposals was carried out, it had a siding that crossed Wading River-Manor Road toward a coal bunker. It was extended to the site of an LIRR Demonstration farm from 1905 to 1928. The other demonstration farm was east of Medford station on the Main Line.

The station was originally a one-story structure that was converted to a two-story structure in 1906. Besides the previously mentioned coal bunker extension, it also had a siding on the south side of the tracks, for an engine house, smaller coal bunker and water tank. The line east of Port Jefferson was abandoned in 1938, and the lumber from the station was used to build a nearby store north of the former station. The right-of-way is now owned by the Long Island Power Authority and used for power lines. In June 2022 a rail trail for bicycling, running, and walking opened.

== Bibliography ==
- Allen, W.F. (1895). Travelers' Official Railway Guide for the United States, Canada and Mexico Containing Railway Time Schedules, Connections and Distances. New York, New York: The National Railway Publication Company.
