= St. James General Store =

- U.S. Historic district – Contributing property
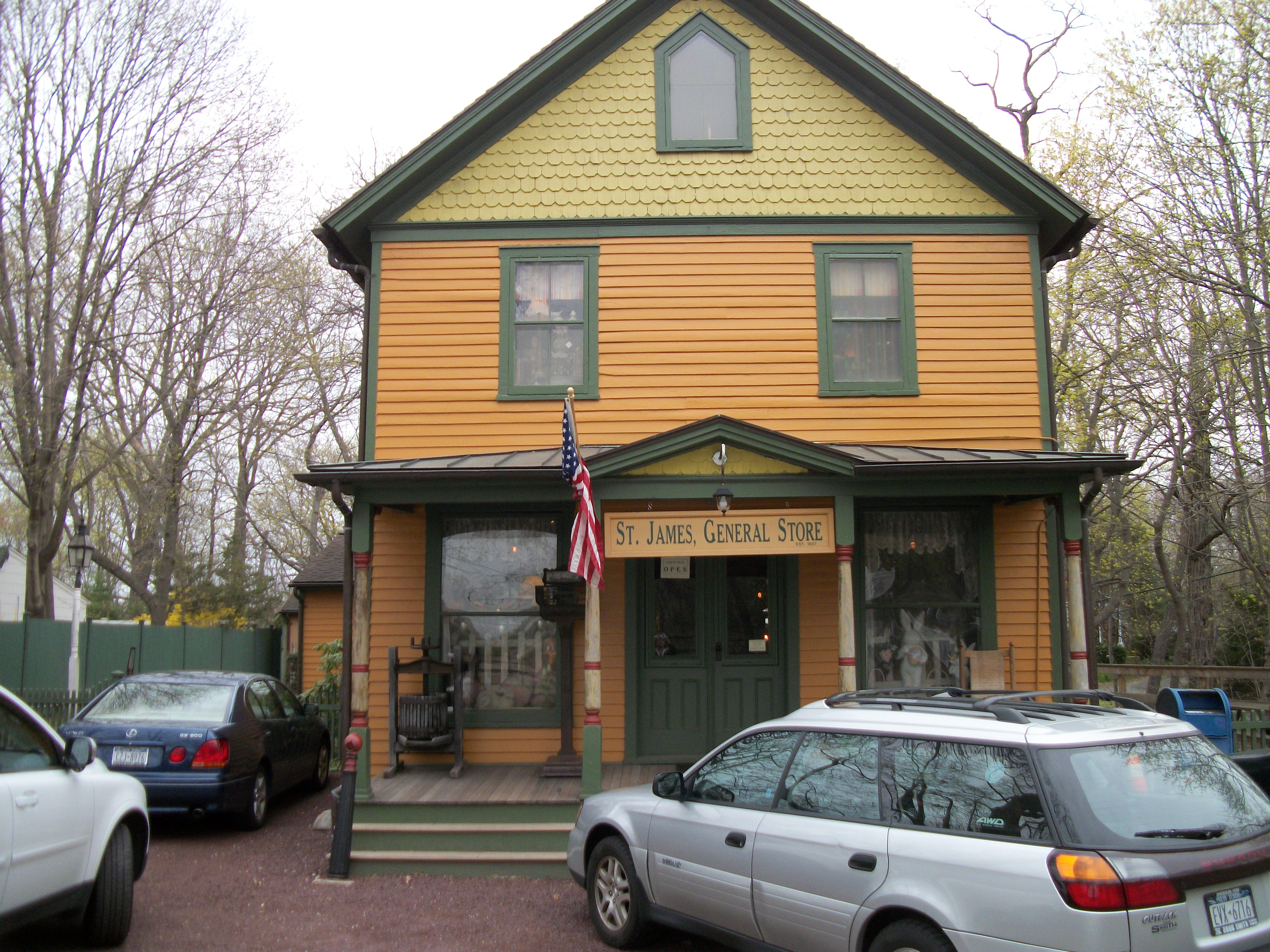
- The Saint James General Store in April 2011

- Location within New York Location within the United States
- Interactive map
- Location: Moriches Road & Harbor Hill Road, St. James, New York
- Coordinates: 40°53′15″N 73°9′42″W
- Built: 1857
- Architect: Ebenezer Smith
- Part of: Saint James District (ID73001275)
- Designated CP: July 20, 1973

The Saint James General Store is a general store located on the northwest corner of Moriches and Harbor Hill Roads in Saint James, New York. Established in 1857, it is a contributing property of the Saint James District, which is primarily in the vicinity of New York State Route 25A in St. James, although the store is located northwest of Route 25A.

== History ==
In the early-1840s Ebenezer Smith, a descendant of Town of Smithtown founder Richard "Bull" Smith sought adventure on a trading expedition west of the Mississippi River Valley with both white settlers and Native Americans. Upon hearing about the California Gold Rush, Smith headed further west in an attempt to expand his fortune.

Returning to Long Island with some level of success, Smith built the General Store in 1857. Much of the community was centered around the vicinity of the store at the time. The majority of customers consisted of local farmers and sailors who depended on the general store for their goods and services. The store also served as the local post office, and in the late-19th Century was the home of the hamlet's first telephone.

When the Smithtown and Port Jefferson Railroad, an LIRR subsidiary built Saint James Railroad Station further south, there was some concern it would lead to land speculators and rampant suburban sprawl. This never took place, and instead attracted various celebrities to the community, as well as to the store. The old store ledgers have been said to contain such names as silent film actor and playwright Willie Collier, former New York City Mayor William Jay Gaynor, architect Stanford White, Frank McNish, Lionel Barrymore, Virginia Lee and Joe Flynn. Later these early stars and personalities were followed by others such as Ethel and John Barrymore, Lillian Russell, Maud Adams, Buster Keaton, Myrna Loy, Ruth Roman, Irving Berlin and Heavyweight Champion James J. Corbett. At the turn of the century, the store was inherited by Ebenezer's son Everett. Everett Smith died in 1940, and the store was taken over by his father-in-law Karl Ericson, who continued to operate it until he was 90 years old.

== Preservation efforts ==
Despite the suburbanization of much of Long Island, the store has remained functional. In 1959, Louise and Andrew Havrisko kept it open and prevented it from becoming a local residence, determined to maintain the historical nature of the store. Structurally unchanged since 1894, it was arranged to represent the period between 1880 and 1910, and that atmosphere has generally remained intact since. In 1973, it became one of a number of contributing properties to the Saint James Historic District, which was listed on the National Register of Historic Places. By 1980 it was bought by another couple named John and Eleanor Oakley, and by 1990 it was purchased by the Suffolk County Department of Parks, and dedicated to the Suffolk County Historical Trust.

Today, as it has done during the second half of the 20th century, the store has sold various late-Victorian-era artifacts. The second floor contains old books and children's toys related to Long Island history.
