= Flowerfield station =

Former train station in New York, US

Flowerfield
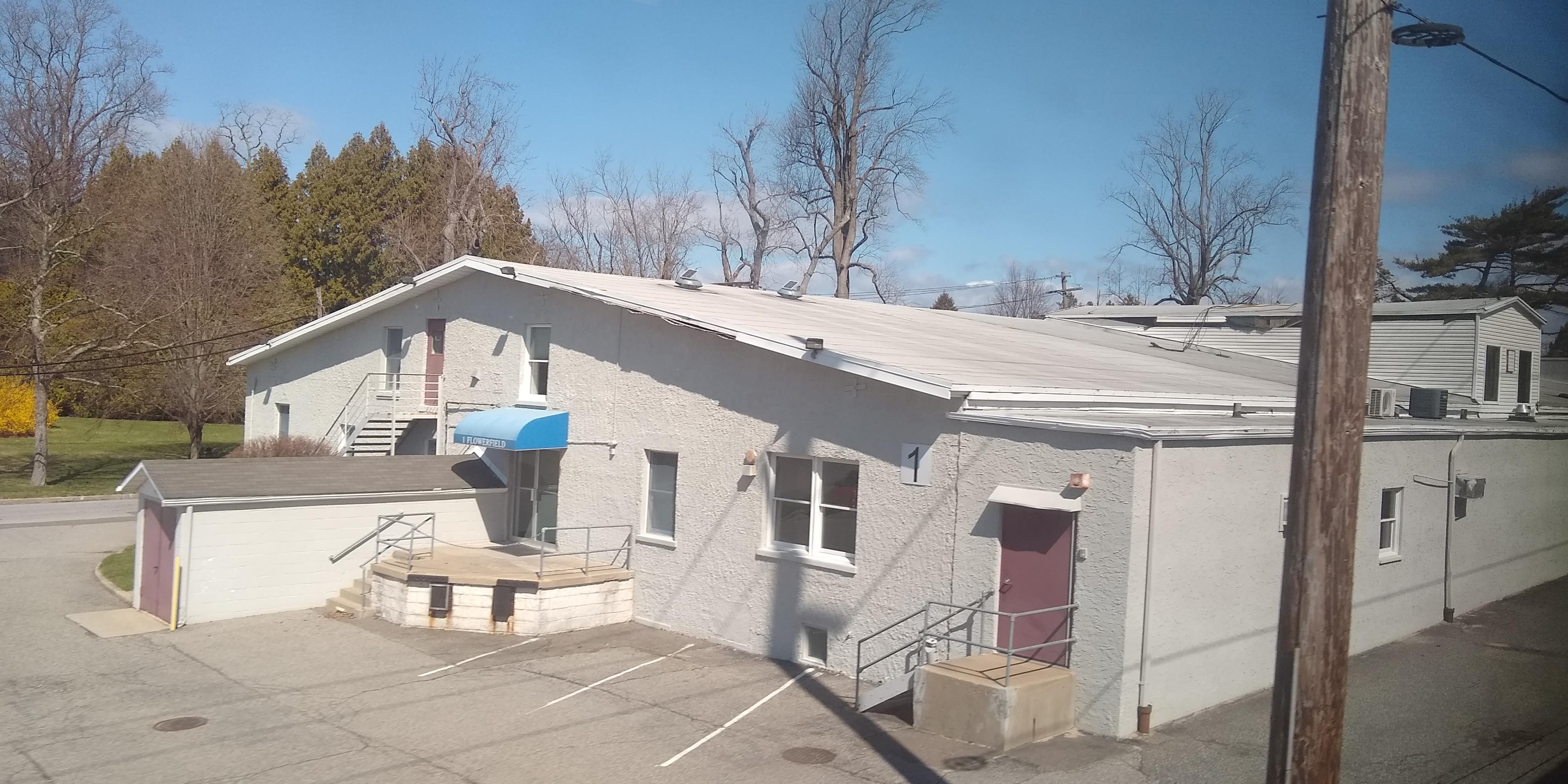
- Building near the former Flowerfield station, viewed from a passing train in 2022

General information
- Location: Parkside Drive; St. James, New York
- Coordinates: 40°53′50″N 73°8′35″W
- Owner: Long Island Rail Road
- Line: Port Jefferson Branch
- Platforms: 1 side platform
- Tracks: 1

Other information
- Station code: None
- Fare zone: 10

History
- Opened: 1910
- Closed: 1959

Services
None
Preceding station	Long Island Rail Road	Following station
Former services
St. James	Port Jefferson Branch	Stony Brook
Location

Flowerfield was a station along the Port Jefferson Branch of the Long Island Rail Road (LIRR) in St. James, New York. Opened in 1910, it served the nursery estate of John Lewis Childs, which cultivated and shipped flowers, bulbs, and seeds. The LIRR discontinued the station agent in 1925, although passenger service continued. The station agency closed in 1944. The station closed in 1959, and its building was demolished in July of that year.

== History ==
Around 1909, horticulturist John Lewis Childs purchased 20 farms east of St. James, New York, which he consolidated to form a nursery estate named Flowerfield and used to expand his mail-order flower and seed business based in Floral Park. The new estate, located adjacent to North Country Road (Route 25A) and the Wading River Branch of the Long Island Rail Road (LIRR), encompassed hundreds of acres devoted to flower cultivation.

In 1910, Childs had a railroad station built to serve his Flowerfield nursery estate. The ground floor of the station building was built of roughly finished concrete and housed the railroad's facilities, including the station office and waiting room. The second floor, which was used by Childs, contained two large rooms, including a sun parlor at its west end. The upper story projected beyond the lower floor, with its overhanging sections supported by four large columns constructed of cobblestones set in cement. It was topped by a hip roof with dormer windows.

Childs' fireproof bulb house at Flowerfield, measuring 90 by 200 feet.

The railroad station served passenger traffic as well as freight and express shipments associated with the nursery estate. It also had a railroad siding. A 90-by-200-foot (27 by 61 m) fireproof bulb house with a 40-by-90-foot (12 by 27 m) basement was built near the station to pack and ship flowers as well as to store bulbs and seeds. A post office was also established at Flowerfield and began operation in November 1910. These facilities supported Childs' large mail-order business, which annually sent out over one million catalogs and received as much as three million pieces of mail. The nursery shipped bulbs around the world from its railroad station, while a regular afternoon train carried freshly cut flowers to markets and bulk purchasers.

In 1925, the LIRR sought permission from the New York State Public Service Commission to abolish Flowerfield station, arguing that it had insufficient business to justify its continued operation. At the time, the station reportedly had only one commuter. The Public Service Commission authorized the removal of the station agent but required passenger service to continue. A caretaker was to maintain the building and attend to freight deliveries. The station agency closed in 1944.

Childs died in 1921, and portions of his estate were offered for sale in 1934. A total of 314 acres (127 ha) of vacant land from the Flowerfield tract were sold in 1935. In 1937, a 335-acre (136 ha) portion of the estate, including residences, barns, and bulb storage buildings, was reported sold to an unnamed General Motors Corporation official. By March 1942, Mrs. James D. Mooney owned the Flowerfield Bulb Farm. A later account reported that she had attempted to operate Flowerfield as both a business and a horticultural hobby, but the venture was consistently unprofitable. In 1950, Flowerfield Bulb Farm advertised its business for sale, noting among its facilities a bulb storage warehouse adjacent to a railroad siding. One year later, the Gyrodyne Company of America acquired a 362-acre (146 ha) tract of the property from the interests of James D. Mooney.

Few trains stopped at Flowerfield station after the nursery was abandoned. On July 2, 1959, the LIRR petitioned the Public Service Commission for permission to discontinue all passenger services and team tracks at the station. The station building was demolished in July 1959.

Gyrodyne ceased operations building helicopters at the site in 1975 and turned some of the property into an industrial park. A proposal to redevelop the Gyrodyne site in the mid-1990s included reopening Flowerfield station and closing St. James station.
