= Setauket station =

Former train station in New York, US

Setauket
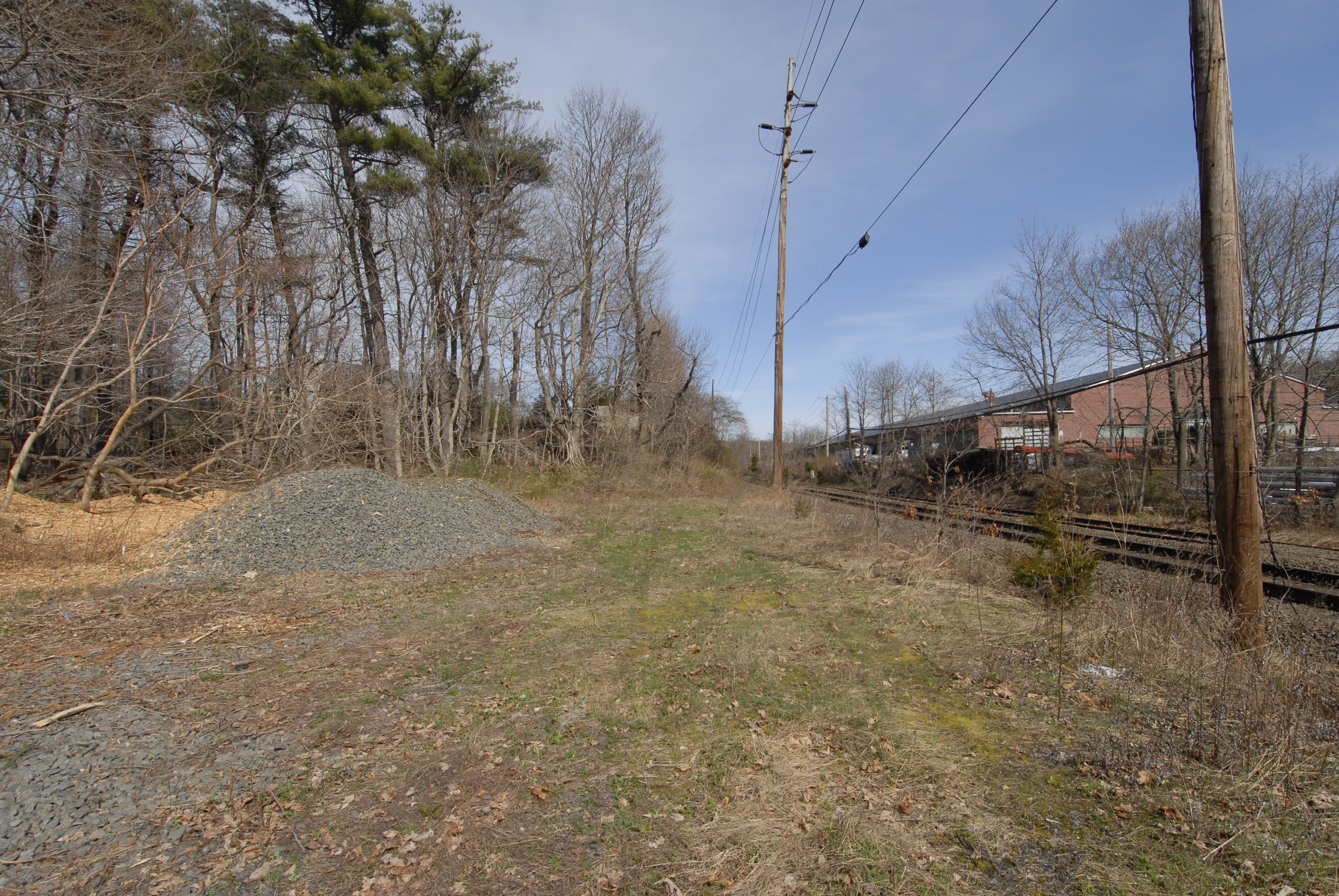
- The site of the former Setauket station in 2010

General information
- Location: Gnarled Hollow Road; East Setauket, New York
- Coordinates: 40.931979°N 73.098607°W
- Owner: Long Island Rail Road
- Line: Port Jefferson Branch
- Platforms: 1 side platform
- Tracks: 2

Other information
- Station code: None
- Fare zone: 10

History
- Opened: July 1873
- Closed: June 27, 1980

Services
None
Preceding station	Long Island Rail Road	Following station
Former services
Stony Brook	Port Jefferson Branch	Port Jefferson
Location

Setauket was a station stop along the Port Jefferson Branch of the Long Island Rail Road. The station was located on the north side of the tracks just east of the bridge where Gnarled Hollow Road passes under the tracks in East Setauket. Access to the station was through a driveway that emptied onto Gnarled Hollow Road just north of the bridge on the east side of the road. The station opened in July 1873 and closed on June 27, 1980.

== History ==
The station was established by the Smithtown and Port Jefferson Railroad (a Long Island Rail Road subsidiary) in July 1873, marked by a sand bank. In February 1877, a new freight depot was built. No depot appears to have been built until January–February 1883.

In June 1912, the Long Island Rail Road (LIRR) began and completed work to install a larger platform around the station depot. In 1938, agent service at the station was discontinued, though it was restored during morning hours in October 1947.

On August 9, 1959, the LIRR petitioned with the New York State Public Service Commission for permission to discontinue all facilities and services at the station except for the handling of carload freight. Ticket service was discontinued in November 1959, as the LIRR planned to replace the station depot with a shelter. This depot was razed on October 3, 1960. In April 1980, the Suffolk County Legislature ceased paying the $5,677 cost to the Metropolitan Transportation Authority for the maintenance and operation of the station, which consisted of a 12 foot by 5 foot concrete slab. There was no station sign at the stop. The station had a shelter, though it had fallen down about a decade earlier and was later burnt down. At the time, the station had three weekday westbound trains, five weekday eastbound trains, and no weekend service.

It was discontinued as a stop on June 27, 1980, due to vandalism and low ridership.

There was also a car named Setauket (LIRR 2038) which was later renamed to LIRR 99 Jamaica. It commonly served on the Cannonball.

== Station layout ==
The station had one track and one small side platform on the north side of the track. Today, the site, across the tracks from the current location of the All-Flags & Flagpoles company (formerly the site of the American Flagpole Factory), is occupied by pole-tech.
