= Saint James District =

Historic district in New York, United States

- U.S. National Register of Historic Places
- U.S. Historic district
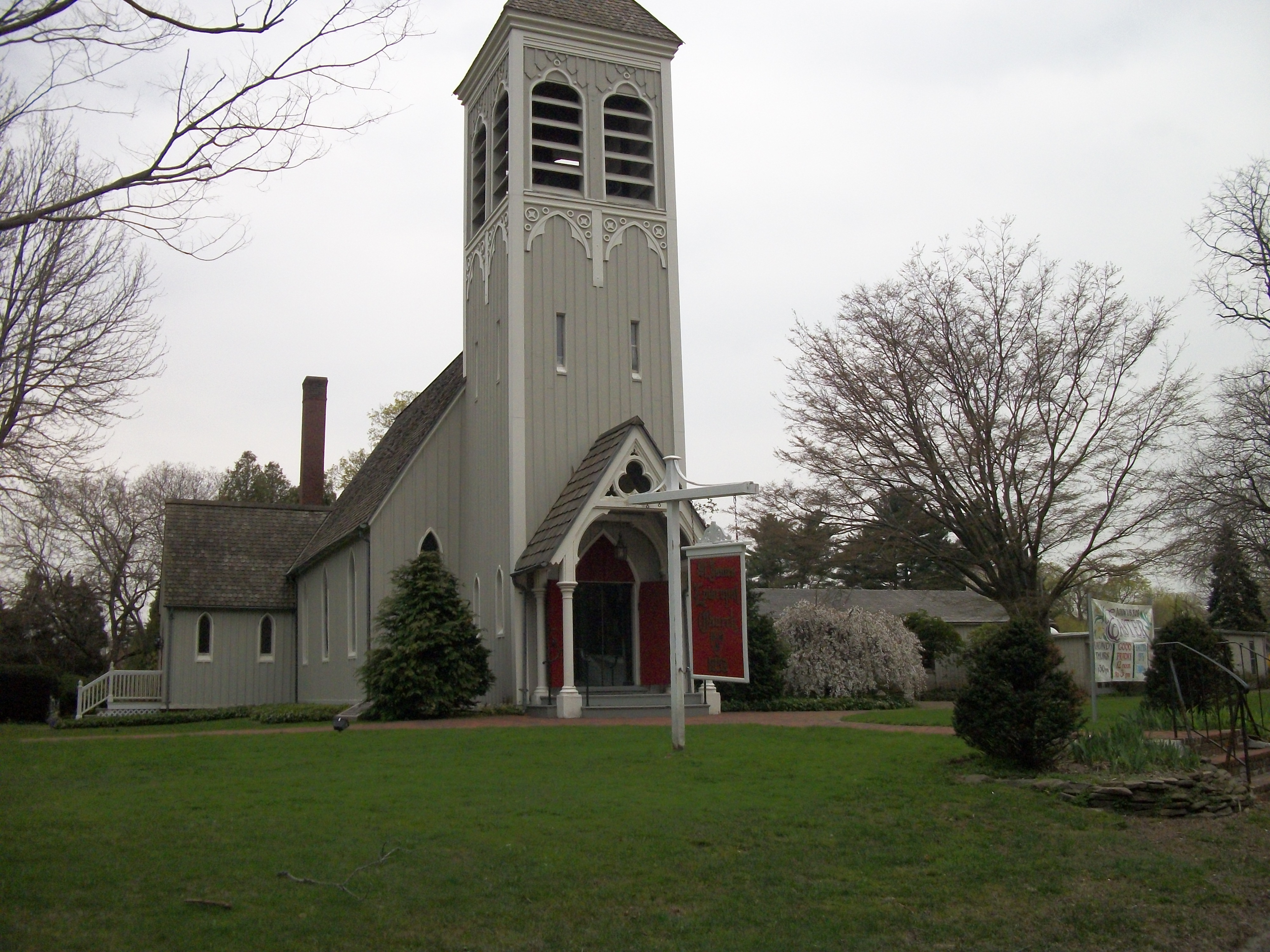
- The St. James Episcopal Church on NY 25A, part of the Saint James Historic District.

- Location within New York Location within the United States
- Location: On NY 25A, St. James, New York
- Coordinates: 40°53′2″N 73°9′46″W
- Area: 90 acres (36 ha)
- Built: 1800
- Architect: Curtis, George
- Architectural style: Greek Revival, Gothic
- NRHP reference No.: 73001275
- Added to NRHP: July 20, 1973

Saint James District is a national historic district located at St. James in Smithtown Town, Suffolk County, New York. The district includes 21 contributing buildings, two contributing sites, and one contributing structure. Prominent buildings within the district are the Timothy Smith House (ca. 1800) and dependencies, "Deepwells" (1845–47) and dependencies, St. James Episcopal Church and dependencies, the St. James Railroad Station (built in 1873), and St. James General Store (built in 1857). The newest structure, the 1922-built Saint James Fire Department was also included in the district, but was modernized in recent decades.

It was added to the National Register of Historic Places in 1973.

== Image gallery ==
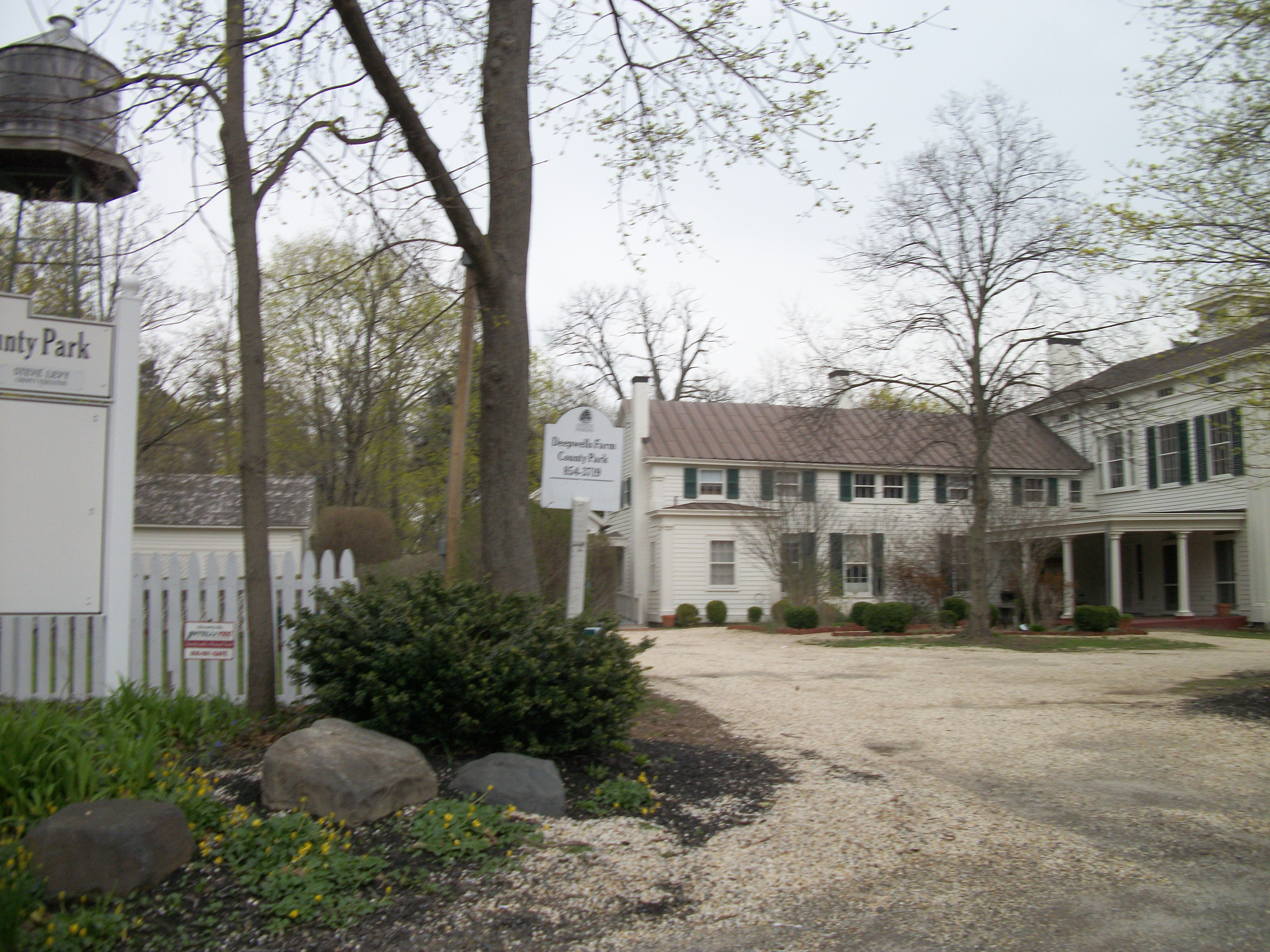
Deepwell's Farm along Taylor Lane.

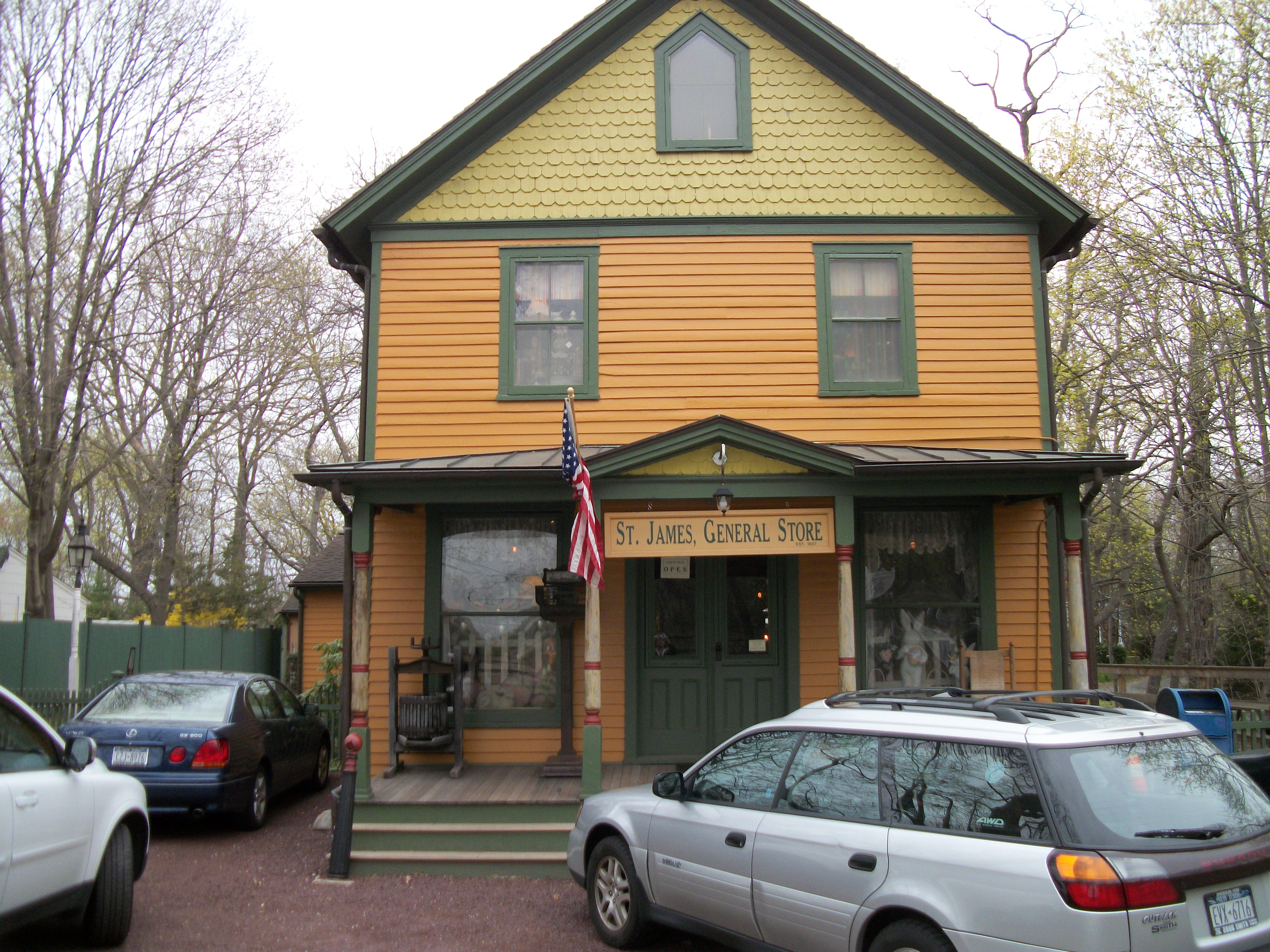
The General Store on Moriches Road.

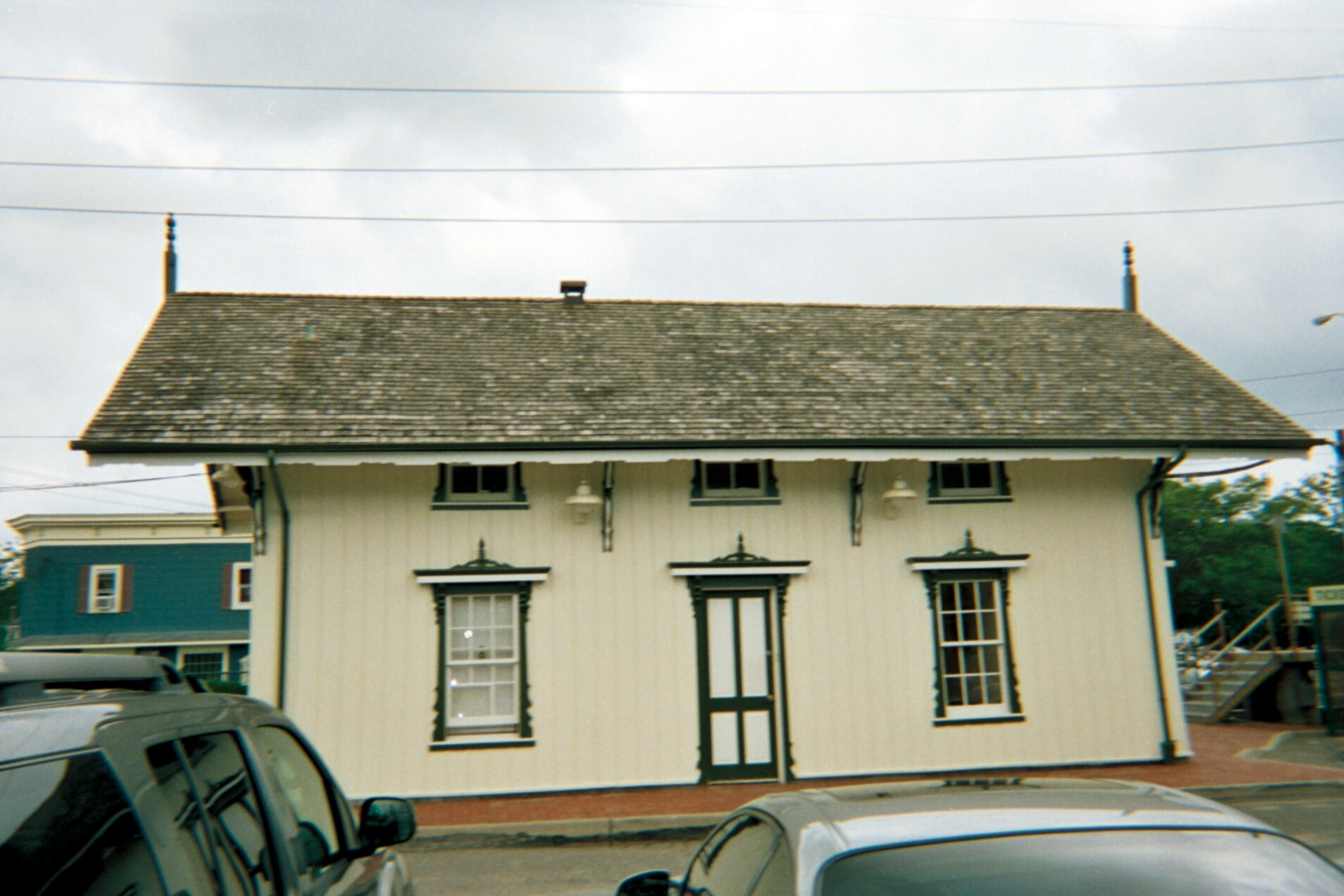
Saint James LIRR station along Lake Avenue South.
