= Hewlett station =

Long Island Rail Road station in Nassau County, New York

Hewlett
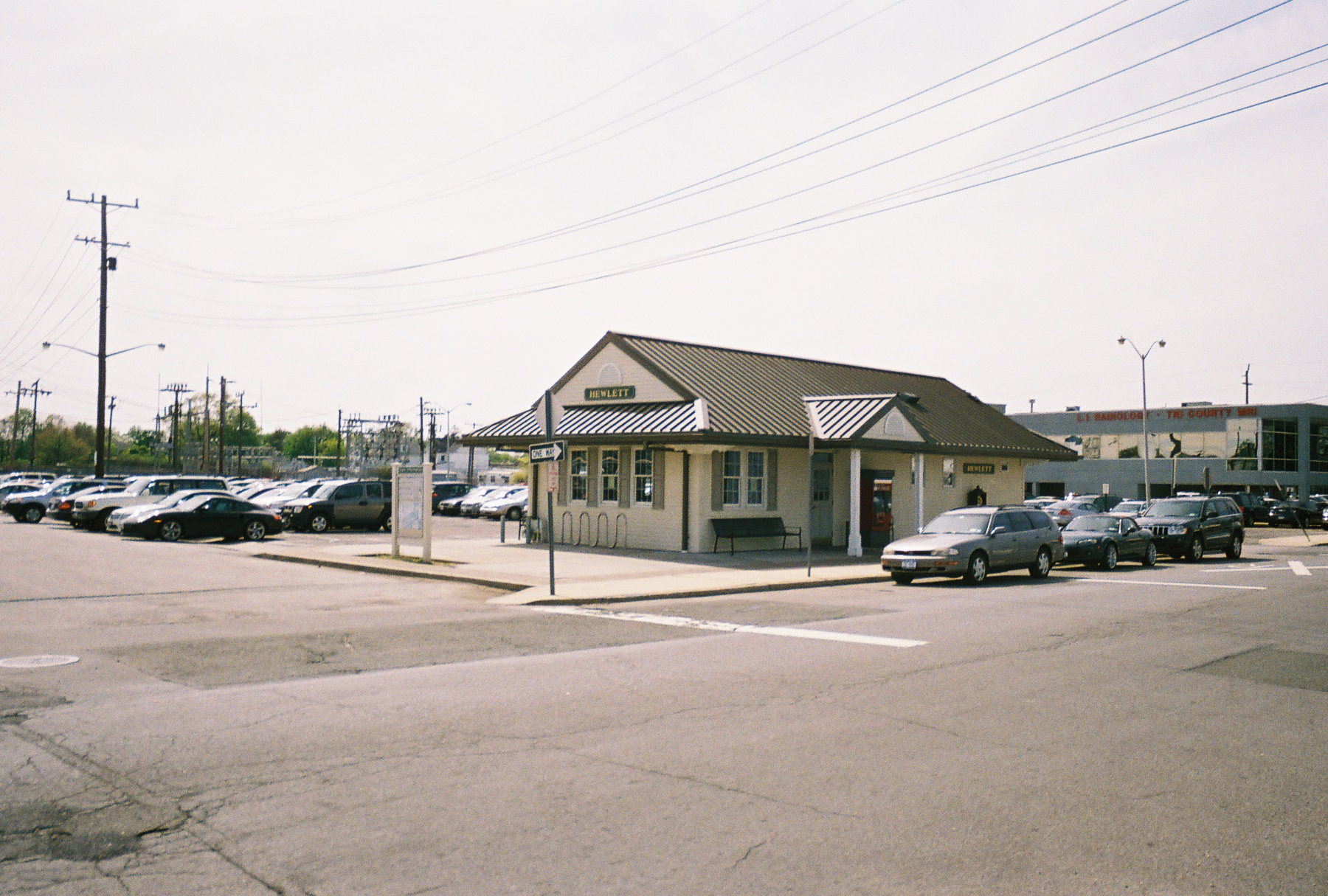
- The 2003 Hewlett station building in 2009, across the tracks and the grade crossing from the long-standing former station.

General information
- Location: Franklin Avenue; Hewlett, New York
- Coordinates: 40.636737°N 73.705151°W
- Owner: Long Island Rail Road
- Line: Far Rockaway Branch
- Platforms: 2 side platforms
- Tracks: 2
- Connections: Nassau Inter-County Express: n1, n31, n31x, n32

Construction
- Parking: Yes; Free
- Cycle facilities: Yes; Bike Rack (at old and new station houses)
- Accessible: yes

Other information
- Station code: HWT
- Fare zone: 4

History
- Opened: July 29, 1869 (SSRRLI)
- Rebuilt: 1870
- Electrified: December 11, 1905; 750 V (DC) third rail
- Former names: Cedar Grove (July–October 1869); Hewletts (1869 – ?)

Passengers
- 2012—2014: 1,838 per weekday

Services
Preceding station	Long Island Rail Road	Following station
Gibson toward Penn Station or Grand Central	Far Rockaway Branch	Woodmere toward Far Rockaway
Former services
Preceding station	Long Island Rail Road	Following station
Gibson toward Valley Stream	Far Rockaway Branch	Woodmere toward Hammels
Gibson Terminus	Rockaway Beach Division	Woodmere toward Woodside
Location

Hewlett is a station on the Long Island Rail Road's Far Rockaway Branch in Hewlett, in Nassau County, New York, United States. The station is located at Franklin Avenue between Broadway and West Broadway.

== History ==
Hewlett station was originally built by the South Side Railroad of Long Island as Cedar Grove station in July 1869. This name would only last until October, when it was changed to Hewletts station. In 1870, the station was replaced with a new building, that has remained intact ever since, making it the oldest railroad station on Long Island, and the only existing building constructed by an LIRR predecessor. High-level sheltered platforms were added across Franklin Avenue during the late-1990s, and a new station house was built diagonally across the grade crossing from the original one between November 25, 2002, and July 28, 2003. After the LIRR built the new Hewlett Station, the oldest active station became the 1873-built Saint James on the Port Jefferson Branch in Suffolk County. Today the former SSRLI Depot is owned by the Long Island Rail Road, but leased to a local taxi company.

== Station layout ==
This station has two high-level side platforms. The east platform (adjacent to Track 1) is 10 cars long and the west platform (adjacent to Track 2) is eight cars long.
