= Stony Brook station (LIRR) =

Long Island Rail Road station in Suffolk County, New York

Stony Brook
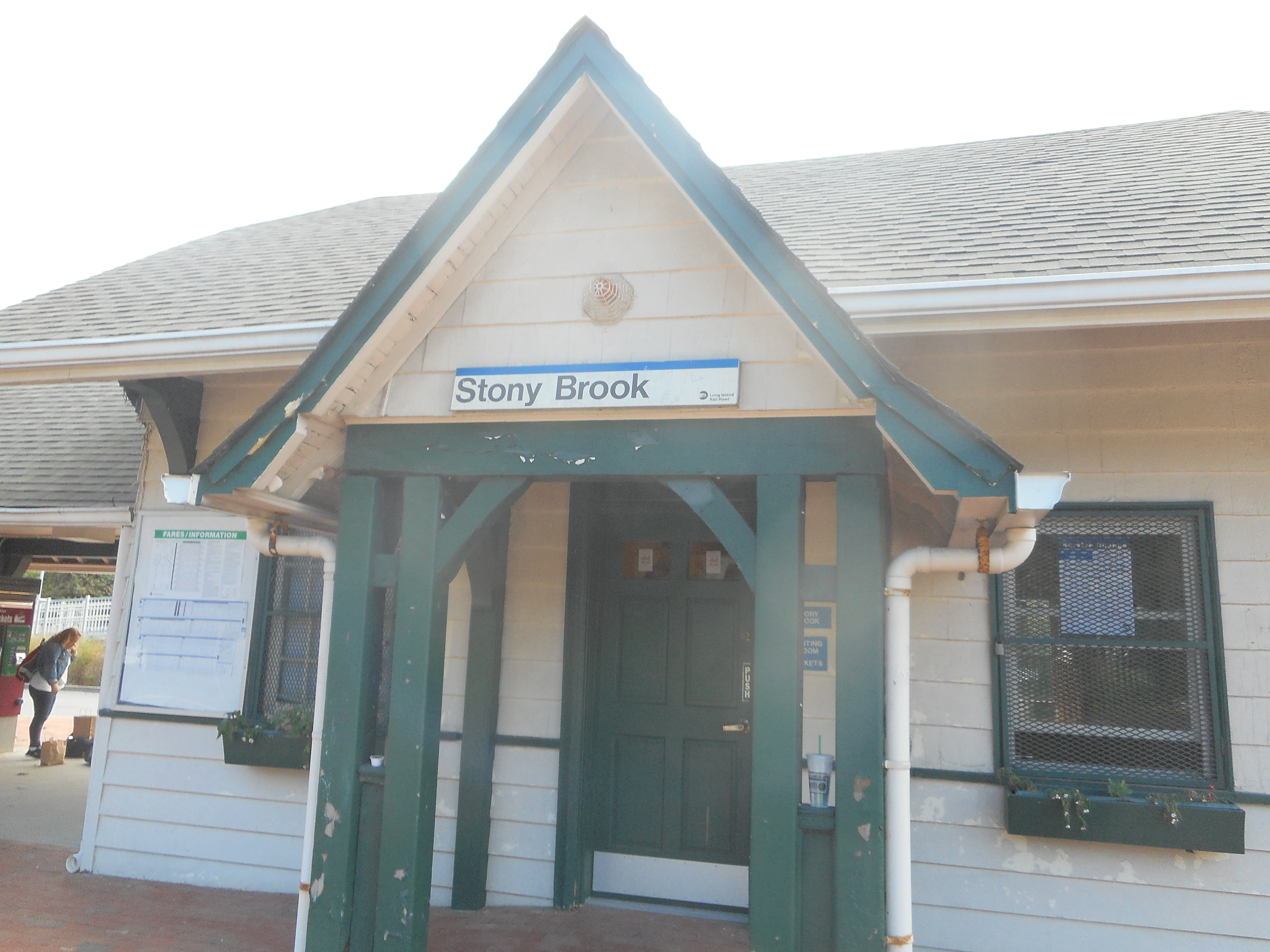
- The Stony Brook station house prior to being restored, as seen from the south side of NY 25A.

General information
- Location: New York State Route 25A and Chapman Street; Stony Brook, New York
- Coordinates: 40°55′12.99″N 73°7′42.65″W
- Owner: MTA
- Platforms: 2 side platforms
- Tracks: 2
- Connections: Suffolk County Transit: 51; Stony Brook University Buses: O (outer loop), R (railroad)

Construction
- Parking: Yes
- Cycle facilities: Yes
- Accessible: Yes

Other information
- Station code: BK
- Fare zone: 10

History
- Opened: 1873
- Rebuilt: 1917, 2010–2011, 2018

Passengers
- 2012–2014: 2,330 per weekday

Services
Preceding station	Long Island Rail Road	Following station
St. James toward Penn Station or Long Island City	Port Jefferson Branch diesel service	Port Jefferson Terminus
Former services
Preceding station	Long Island Rail Road	Following station
Flowerfield toward Hicksville	Wading River Branch	Setauket toward Wading River
Location

Stony Brook (co-signed as Stony Brook University) is a station on the Port Jefferson Branch of the Long Island Rail Road. It is located in Stony Brook, New York, adjacent to the campus of Stony Brook University, on the southeast side of New York State Route 25A, across the street from the intersection with Cedar Street. There is also a gated at-grade pedestrian crossing between the station and a parking lot at the University – one of only a few stations on the Long Island Rail Road to feature such crossings.

== History ==
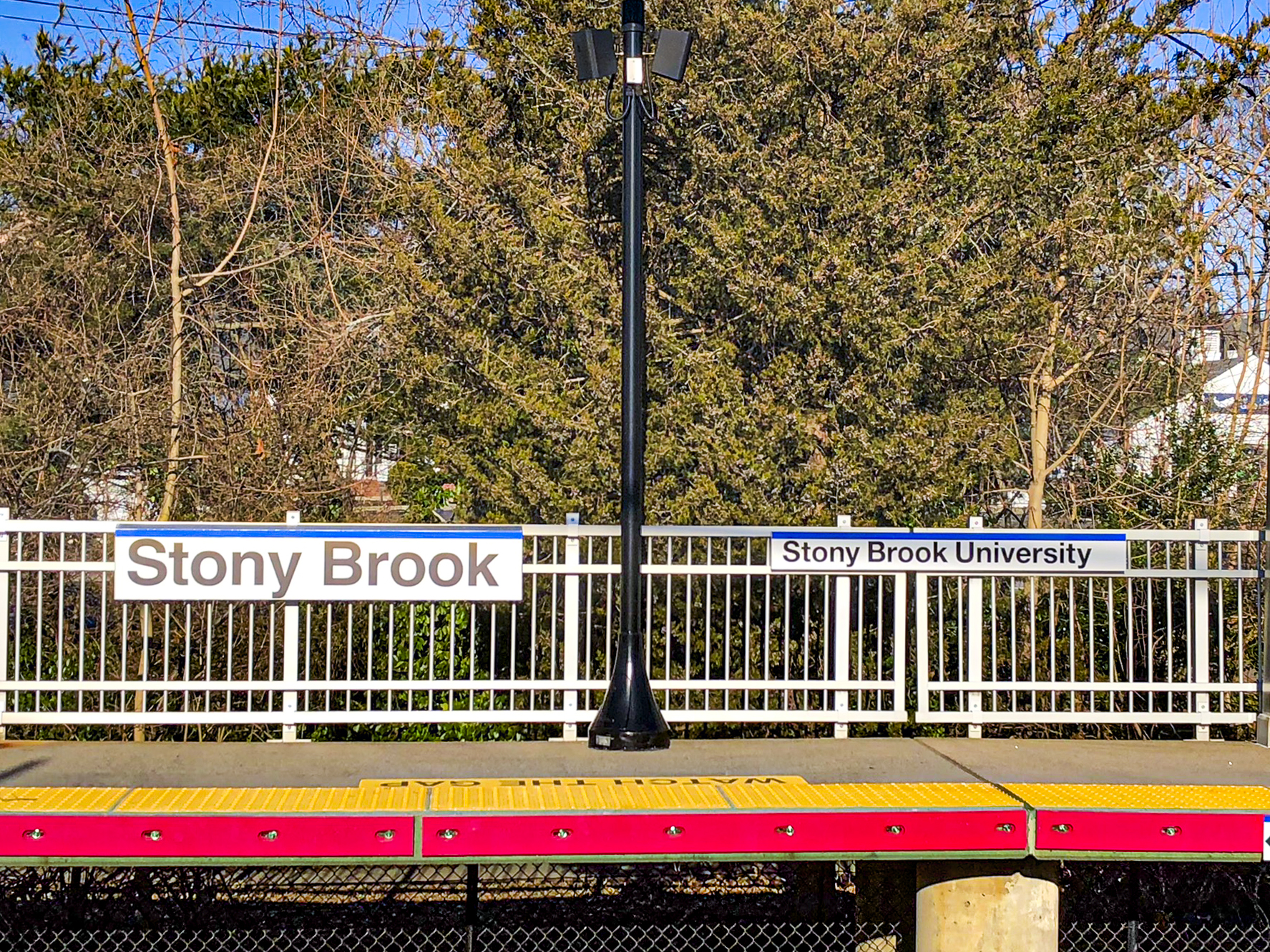
The Stony Brook University sign at the Stony Brook LIRR station

The Stony Brook station was built in 1873 by the Smithtown and Port Jefferson Railroad (although some sources have claimed it was built in 1888), and rebuilt in 1917. Despite the impact of the arrival of Stony Brook University in 1957, the station has remained a small one-story depot. Parking has always been limited, but efforts to increase capacity at the station have been attempted both by SUNY and NYSDOT.

When the Flowerfield station (to the west) closed in 1958 and the Setauket station (to the east) closed in 1980, Stony Brook station became the penultimate station on the Port Jefferson Branch. In 1989, the station underwent a renovation project, including 12-car-long high-level platforms, a pedestrian overpass, and straightening of the tracks, as well as a new parking lot on the Stony Brook University campus. Beginning in April 2010, the Metropolitan Transportation Authority planned a renovation project that was intended to last until January 2011.

In 2018, the station underwent a major renovation project, taking place between that August and October. The renovation updated the interior and exterior of the station house, added USB charging stations, free public Wi-Fi, new benches and new CCTV security cameras.

== Station layout ==
Stony Brook is a double-tracked station, allowing trains traveling in opposite directions to pass each other; on both ends of the station, the two tracks merge into one. Between 1986 and 1988, high level platforms were added and the two tracks were slightly realigned, creating a small parking lot between the station building and the platforms.
