= St. James, New York =

- Hamlet and census-designated place
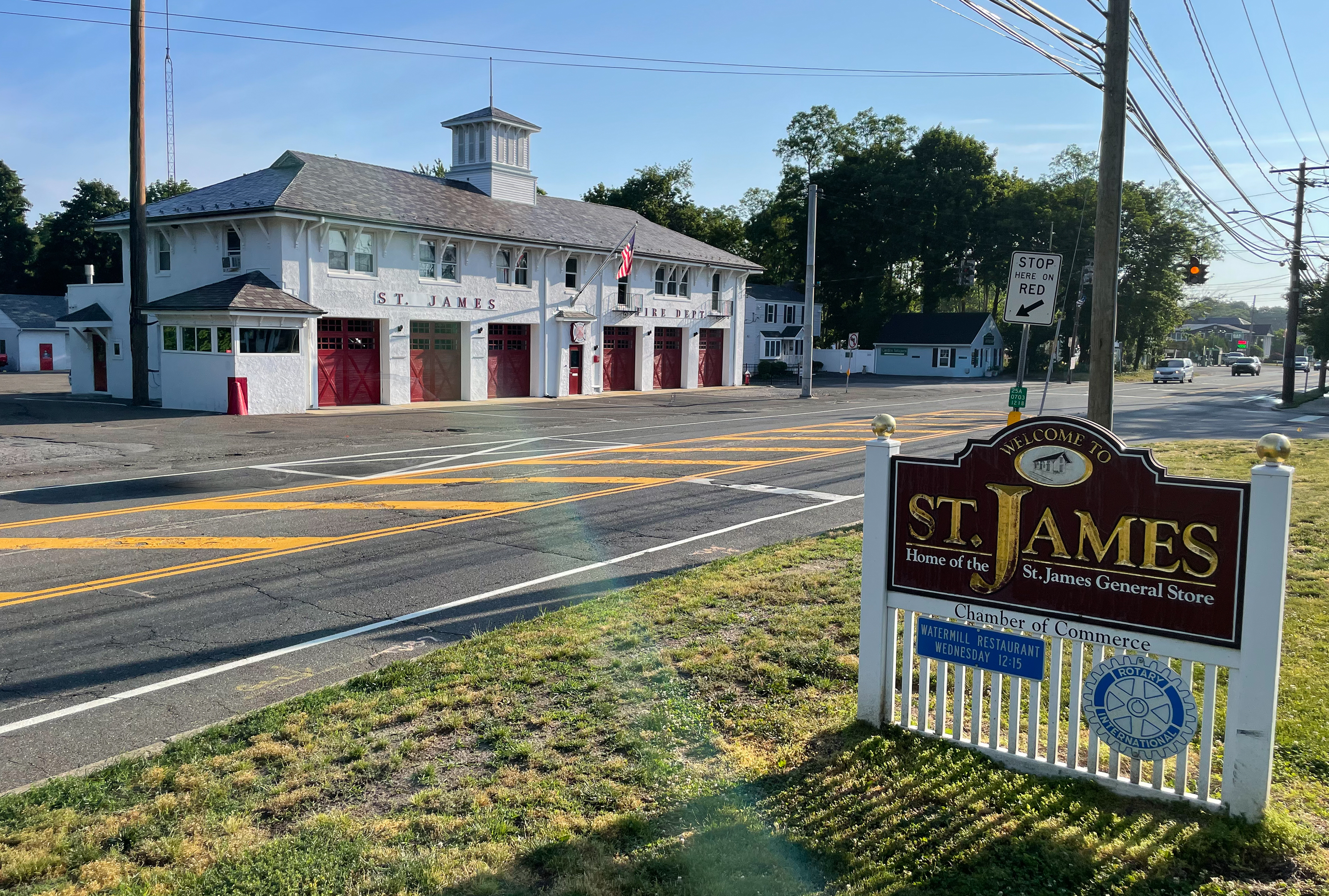
- Welcome to St. James

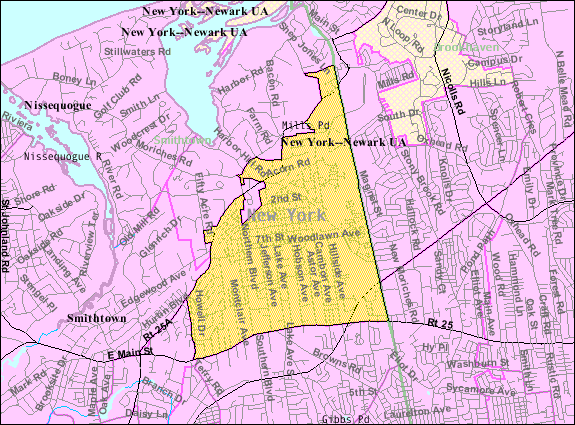
- U.S. Census map

- Location within New York
- Coordinates: 40°52′38″N 73°9′19″W
- Country: United States
- State: New York
- County: Suffolk
- Towns: Huntington, Smithtown

Area
  - Total: 4.56 sq mi (11.82 km^{2})
  - Land: 4.56 sq mi (11.82 km^{2})
  - Water: 0 sq mi (0.00 km^{2})
- Elevation: 151 ft (46 m)

Population (2020)
  - Total: 13,487
  - Density: 2,960/sq mi (1,141/km^{2})
- Time zone: UTC-5 (Eastern (EST))
  - Summer (DST): UTC-4 (EDT)
- ZIP codes: 11755, 11780, 11787
- Area code(s): 631, 934
- FIPS code: 36-64584
- GNIS feature ID: 0963553

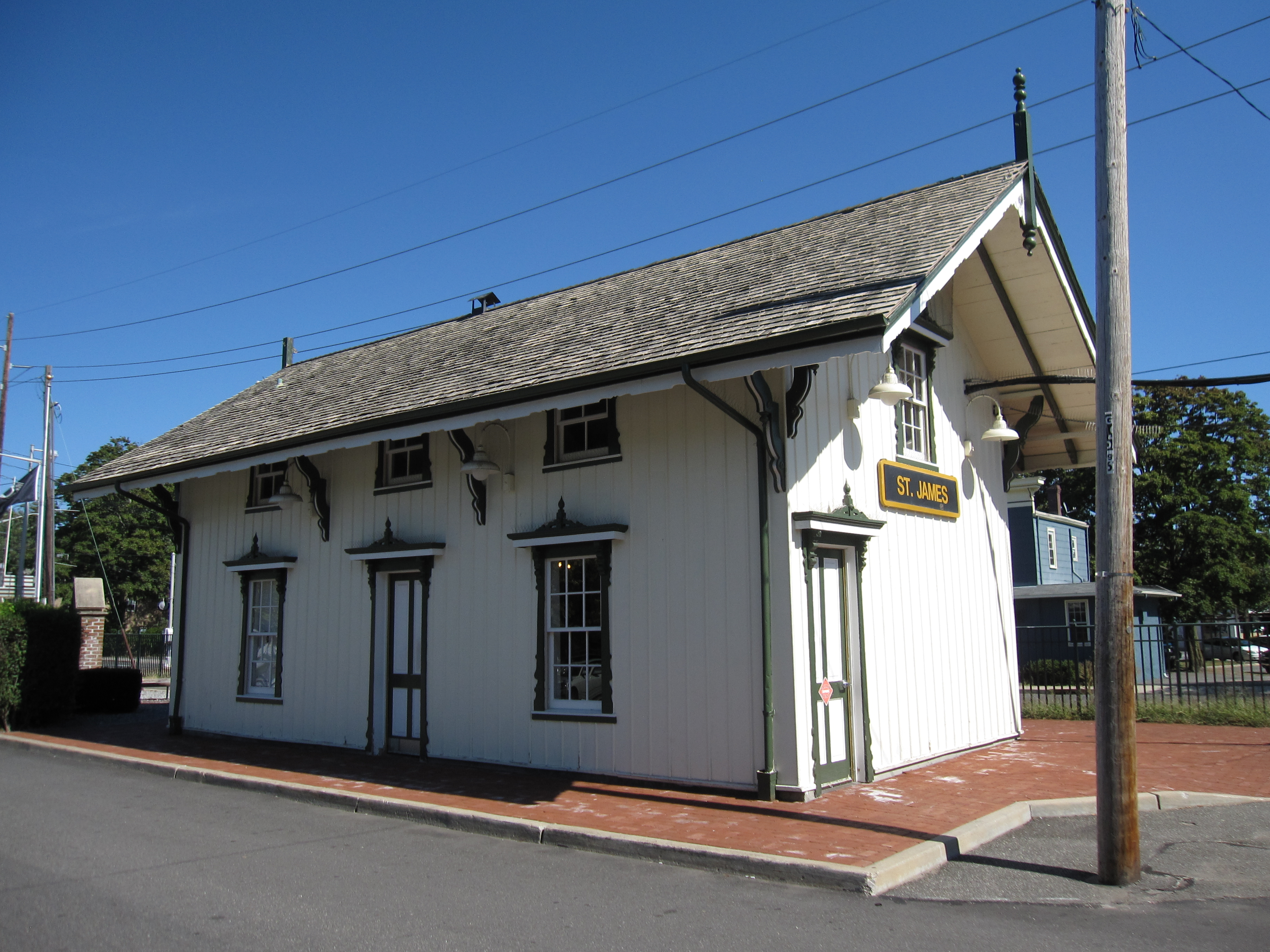
St. James (LIRR station)

St. James is a hamlet and census-designated place (CDP) in Suffolk County, New York, United States. The population of the CDP was 13,487 at the 2020 census. St. James is part of the Town of Smithtown and is located on the North Shore of Long Island. The ZIP code is 11780.

== History ==
In the early 20th century, St. James was a popular vacation spot for glitterati of the stage and screen. Summer residents included Lionel, Ethel, and John Barrymore, Buster Keaton, Myrna Loy, and Irving Berlin, among others. Noteworthy persons of the hamlet have included Stanford White, architect; William Jay Gaynor, New York State Supreme Court Justice and Mayor of New York City; Wilton Decker, inventor of the electronic piano; Mick Foley, professional wrestler; Soledad O'Brien, television personality; John Miceli, drummer for Meat Loaf; and John Petrucci, lead guitar player for Dream Theater.

The St. James General Store, located on Moriches Road, is said to be the oldest continuously operating general store in the United States. It and a number of other historic structures were added to the National Register of Historic Places in 1973 as part of the Saint James District.

Many of these 19th-century structures are located along New York State Route 25A, otherwise known as North Country Road. Among them is Saint James Episcopal Church, the source of the hamlet's name during the 1850s. In 1873, St. James Rail Road Station was established. Although small, the historic station-house is the second-oldest on the Long Island Rail Road.

== Geography ==
St. James is located at 40°52′38″N 73°9′19″W (40.877202, -73.155260).

According to the United States Census Bureau, the CDP has a total area of 4.5 square miles (12 km^{2}), all land. To the north of the hamlet lies the Village of Head of the Harbor and Stony Brook Harbor.

St. James is situated in the eastern part of the town of Smithtown, east of the hamlet of Smithtown. Immediately due east of St. James sits the main campus of Stony Brook University, a major public research university.

It is approximately 15 minutes from Port Jefferson. This allows for quick access to the Bridgeport & Port Jefferson Ferry, which offers transportation across the Long Island Sound to New England while avoiding New York City traffic.

== Education ==
St. James is entirely within the boundaries of the Smithtown Central School District.

Smithtown High School East is located within St. James.

== Demographics ==
Historical population
Census	Pop.	Note	%±
2000	13,268		—
2010	13,338		0.5%
2020	13,487		1.1%
U.S. Decennial Census

=== 2020 census ===
As of the 2020 census, St. James had a population of 13,487. The median age was 47.2 years. 19.4% of residents were under the age of 18 and 22.2% of residents were 65 years of age or older. For every 100 females, there were 88.6 males, and for every 100 females age 18 and over, there were 86.8 males age 18 and over.

100.0% of residents lived in urban areas, while 0.0% lived in rural areas.

There were 4,729 households in St. James, of which 30.9% had children under the age of 18 living in them. Of all households, 59.7% were married-couple households, 11.5% were households with a male householder and no spouse or partner present, and 24.9% were households with a female householder and no spouse or partner present. About 22.8% of all households were made up of individuals, and 15.4% had someone living alone who was 65 years of age or older.

There were 4,921 housing units, of which 3.9% were vacant. The homeowner vacancy rate was 1.1% and the rental vacancy rate was 5.3%.

Racial composition as of the 2020 census
Race	Number	Percent
White	11,859	87.9%
Black or African American	137	1.0%
American Indian and Alaska Native	16	0.1%
Asian	514	3.8%
Native Hawaiian and Other Pacific Islander	2	0.0%
Some other race	234	1.7%
Two or more races	725	5.4%
Hispanic or Latino (of any race)	1,037	7.7%

=== 2000 census ===
As of the 2000 census, there were 13,268 people, 4,555 households, and 3,466 families residing in the CDP. The population density was 2,924.6 inhabitants per square mile (1,129.2/km^{2}). There were 4,674 housing units at an average density of 1,030.3 per square mile (397.8/km^{2}). The racial makeup of the CDP was 97.36% White, 0.27% African American, 0.05% Native American, 1.24% Asian, 0.01% Pacific Islander, 0.55% from other races, and 0.52% from two or more races. Hispanic or Latino of any race were 3.45% of the population.

There were 4,555 households, out of which 36.6% had children under the age of 18 living with them, 66.5% were married couples living together, 7.2% had a female householder with no husband present, and 23.9% were non-families. 20.6% of all households were made up of individuals, and 13.3% had someone living alone who was 65 years of age or older. The average household size was 2.81 and the average family size was 3.27.

In the CDP, the population was spread out, with 25.9% under the age of 18, 5.0% from 18 to 24, 29.8% from 25 to 44, 21.2% from 45 to 64, and 18.1% who were 65 years of age or older. The median age was 39 years. For every 100 females, there were 88.4 males. For every 100 females age 18 and over, there were 82.6 males.

The median income for a household in the CDP was $71,144, and the median income for a family was $82,291. Males had a median income of $59,018 versus $38,103 for females. The per capita income for the CDP was $29,643. About 1.6% of families and 2.6% of the population were below the poverty line, including 1.8% of those under age 18 and 2.2% of those age 65 or over.
