= St. James station (LIRR) =

Long Island Rail Road station in Suffolk County, New York

St James
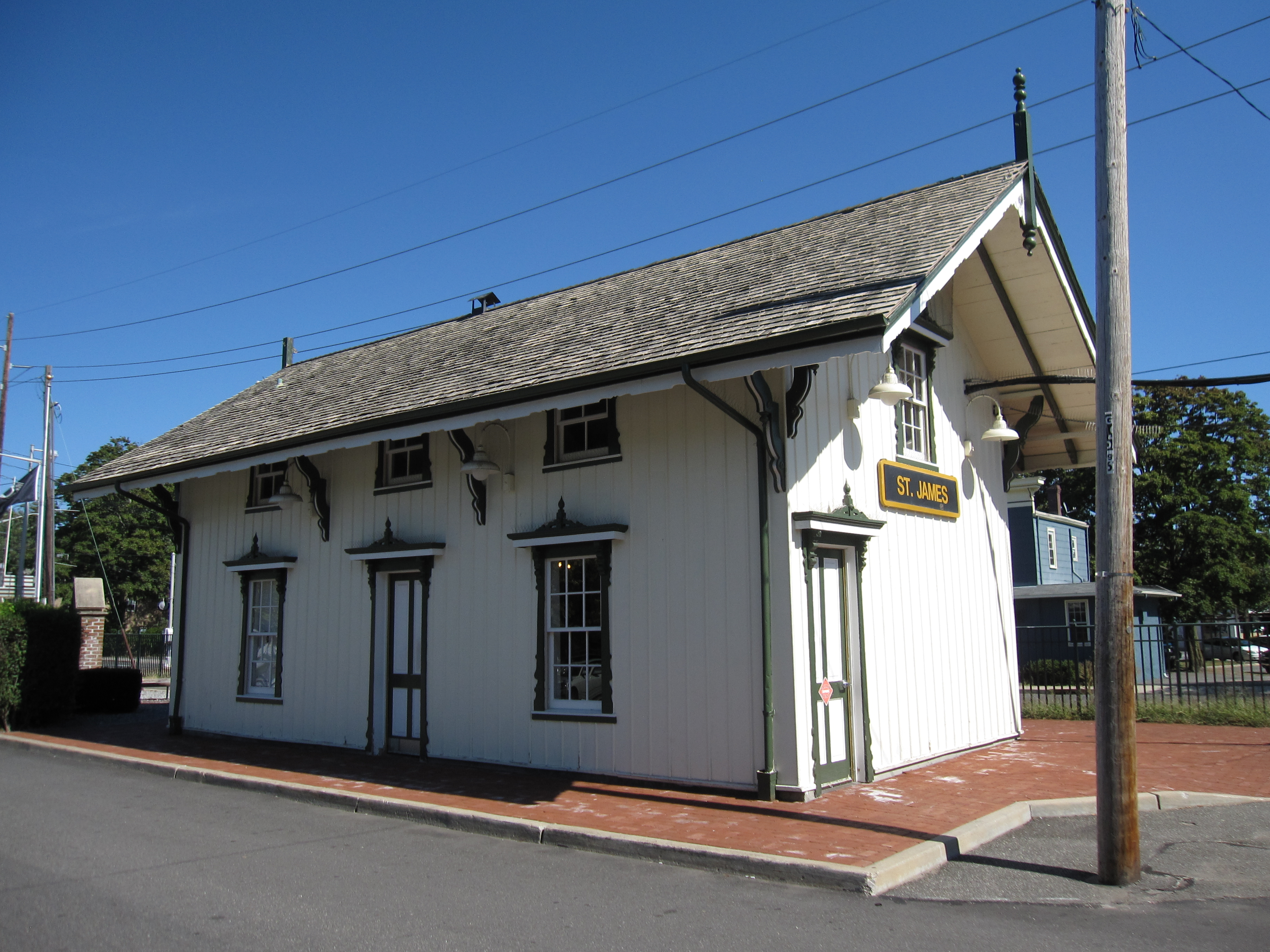
- St. James Long Island Rail Road station

General information
- Location: Lake Avenue and Railroad Avenue; St. James, New York
- Owner: Long Island Rail Road
- Platforms: 1 side platform
- Tracks: 1
- Connections: NYS Bike Route 25

Construction
- Parking: Yes; Free and Town of Smithtown permits
- Cycle facilities: Yes
- Accessible: Yes

Other information
- Station code: SJM
- Fare zone: 10

History
- Opened: 1873
- Rebuilt: 1974, 1997

Passengers
- 2012–2014: 750 per weekday

Services
Preceding station	Long Island Rail Road	Following station
Smithtown toward Penn Station or Long Island City	Port Jefferson Branch diesel service	Stony Brook toward Port Jefferson
Former services
Preceding station	Long Island Rail Road	Following station
Smithtown toward Hicksville	Wading River Branch	Flowerfield toward Wading River
- Saint James Railroad Station
- U.S. Historic district – Contributing property
- Location: Saint James, New York, USA
- Coordinates: 40°52′59.78″N 73°9′29.35″W
- Built: 1873
- Architect: Calvin L'Hommedieu
- Part of: Saint James Historic District (ID73001275)
- MPS: Saint James District MRA
- Added to NRHP: July 20, 1973
Location

St. James is a station and historic landmark on the Port Jefferson Branch of the Long Island Rail Road. The station is located on Lake Avenue and Railroad Avenue, just south of New York State Route 25A in St. James, Suffolk County, New York.

== History ==
St. James station was built in 1873, along the Smithtown and Port Jefferson Railroad in the northern part of the Town of Smithtown. The station house, designed by Calvin L'Hommedieu, remains the second-oldest existing station-house of the Long Island Rail Road, surpassed only by Hewlett station, which was originally built in 1869 by the South Side Railroad of Long Island. When the Flowerfield station to the east was abandoned in 1958, the commuters who previously used that depot at the Gyrodyne Company of America were redirected to the St. James and Stony Brook, New York depots. Until 1964, the station also contained an express house and an outhouse, both of which were demolished along with some trees to make room for an expanded parking lot, much to the chagrin of the community. The station is located within the Saint James District, which was added to the National Register of Historic Places in 1973.

The station faced two restoration projects in the MTA era. The first took place in 1974, and the second took place in 1997, when the LIRR installed high-level platforms at the station.

No buses stop at the station. However, local suburban taxicab service is available, and the station serves as a stop along New York State Bicycle Route 25. The only modifications to the depot in recent years have been to make the station more accessible to the disabled.

== Station layout ==
This station has one 12-car-long high-level side platform north of the track.

== Image gallery ==
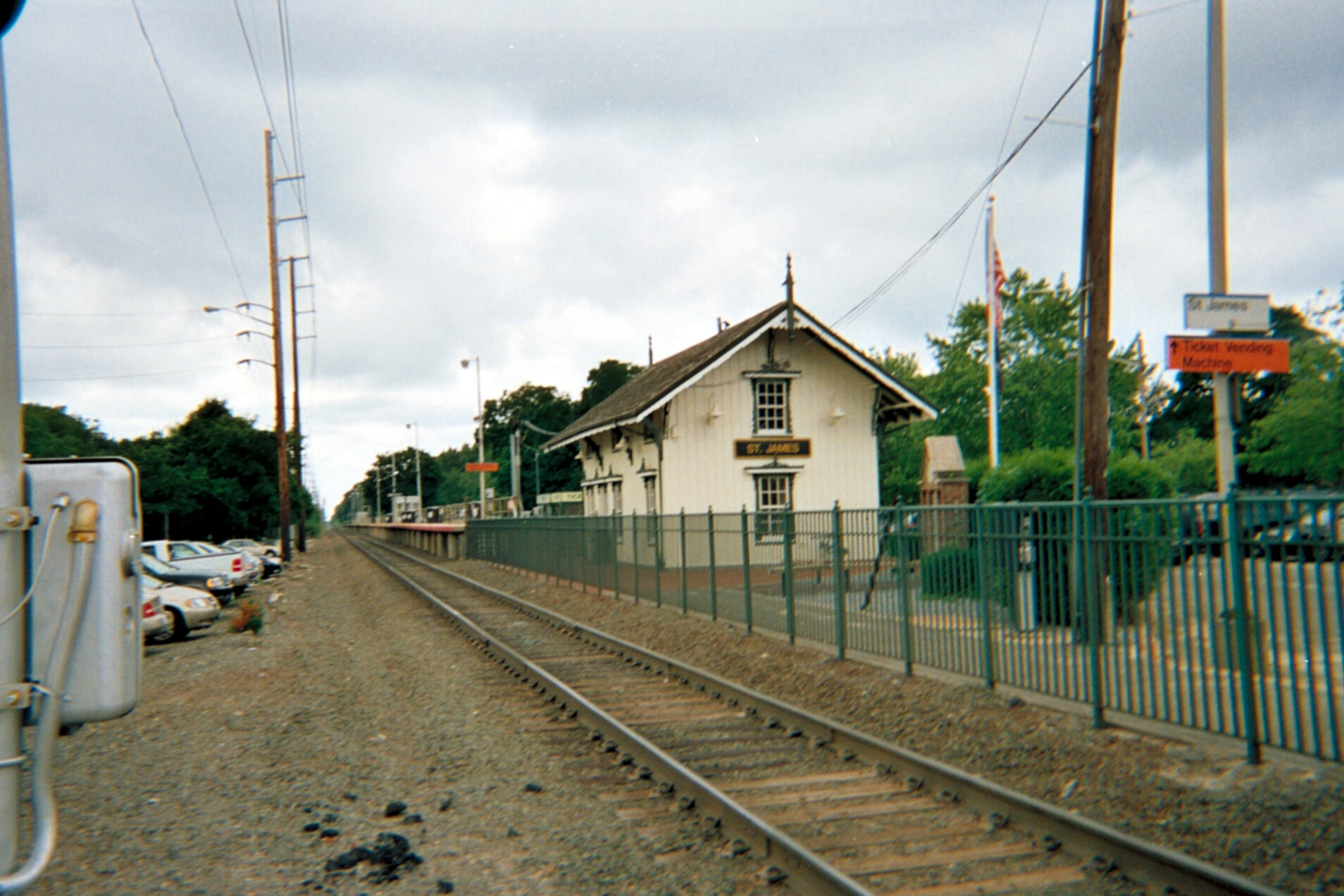
St. James station looking west from Lake Avenue South crossing

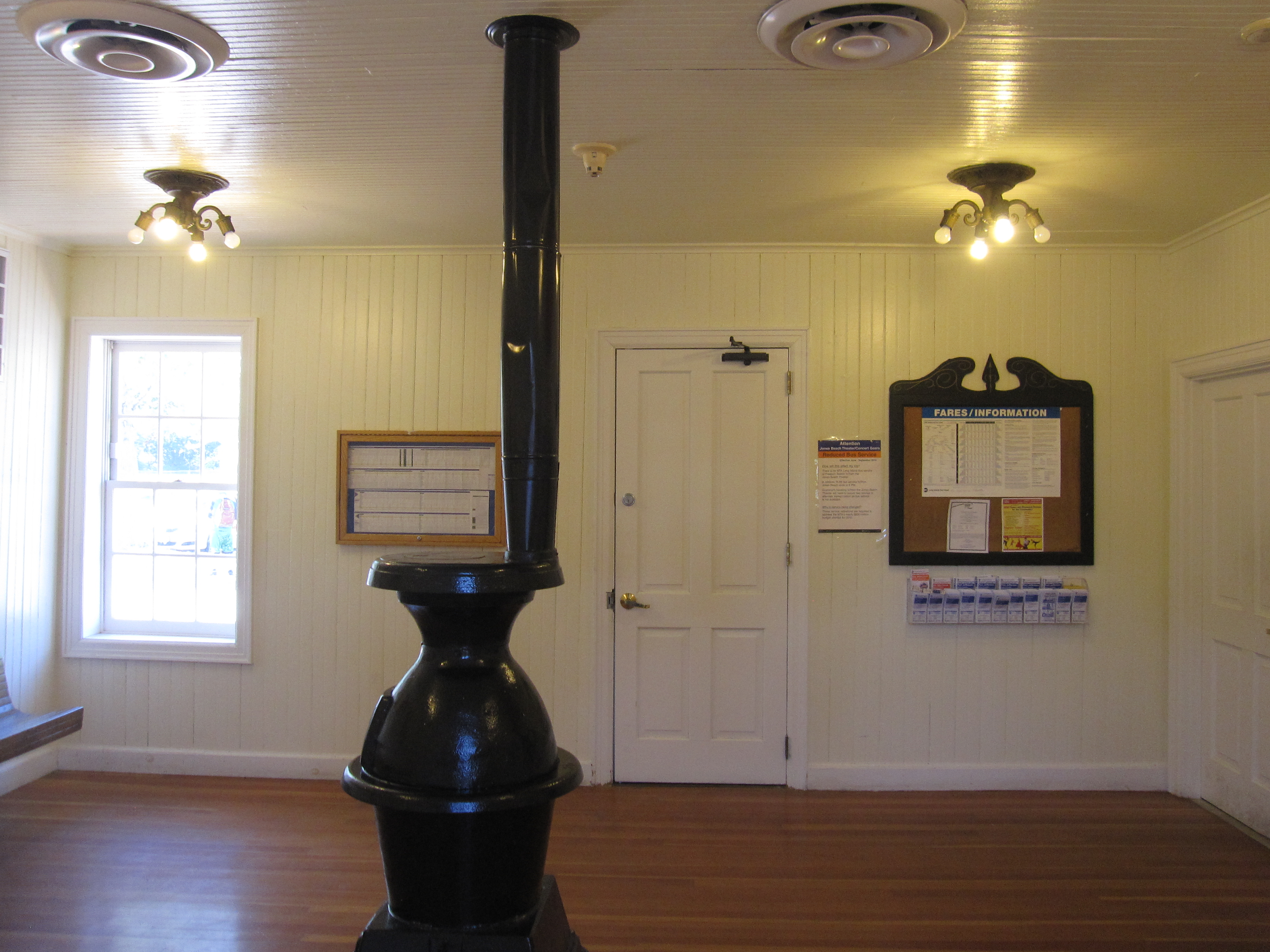
Interior of the station

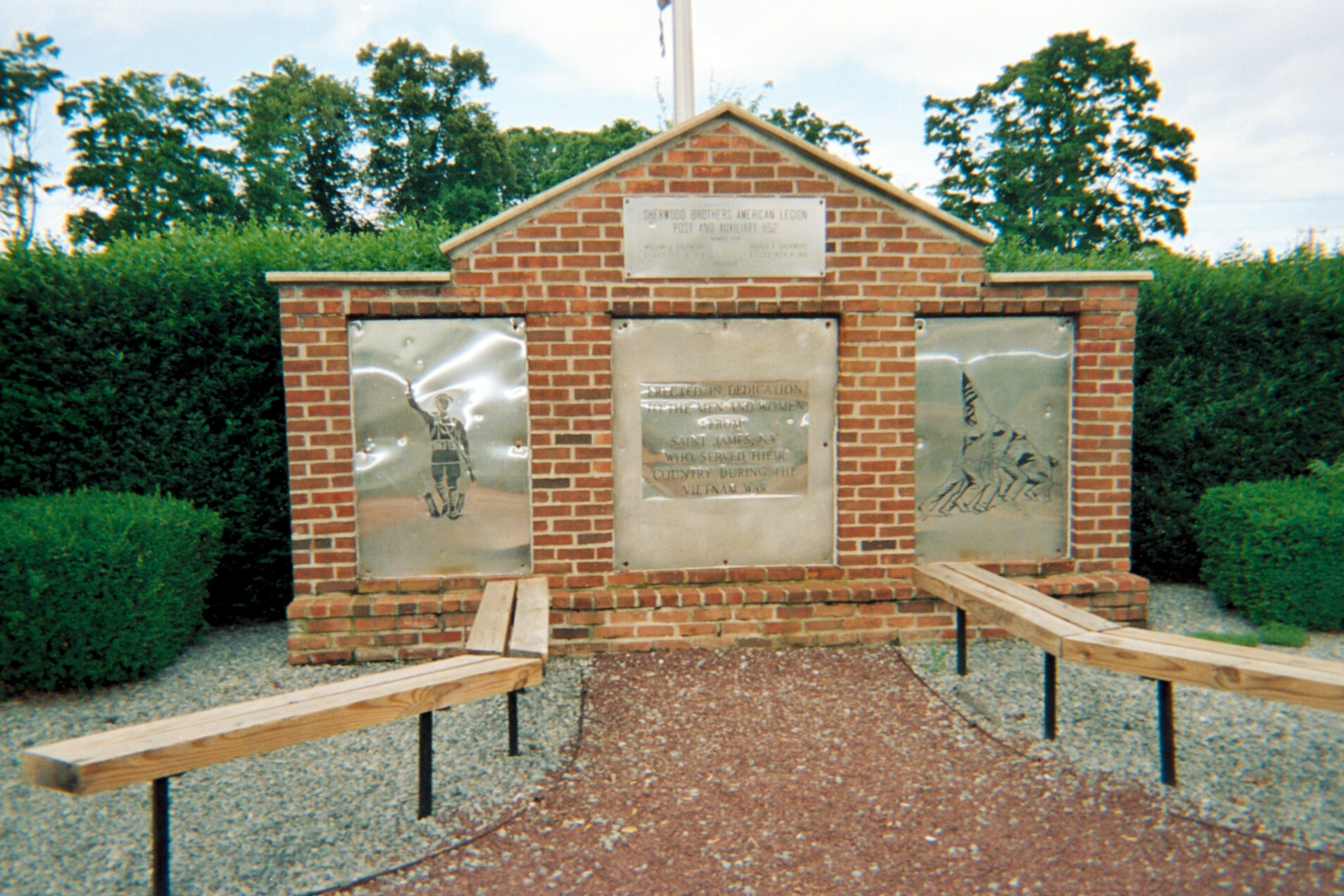
St. James station war memorial, sponsored by the American Legion

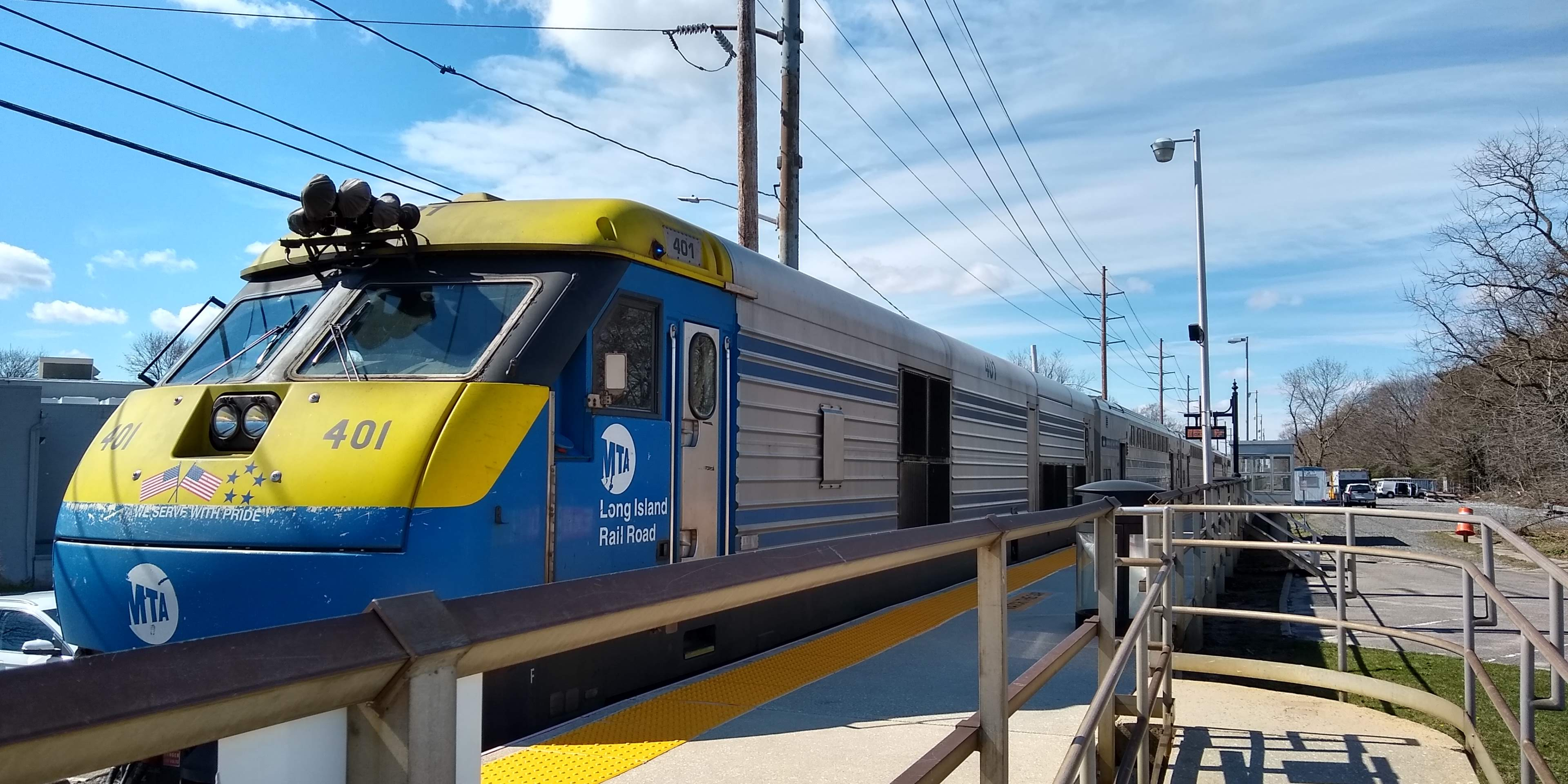
Westbound train leaving the station
