= Michele Titus =

American politician

Michele R. Titus
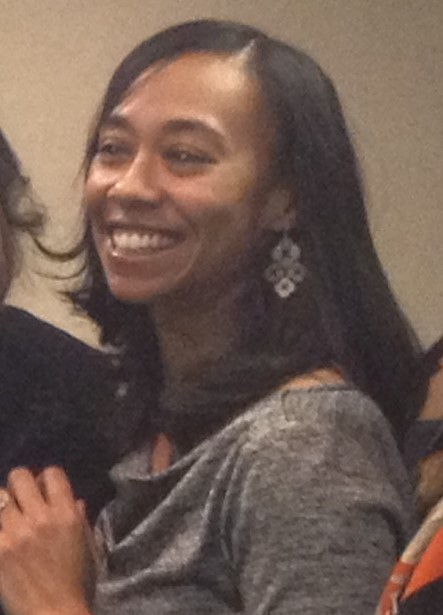

New York City Civil Court Judge
- Incumbent
- Assumed office January 1, 2020

Member of the New York State Assembly from the 31st district
- In office April 22, 2002 – January 1, 2020
- Preceded by: Pauline Rhodd-Cummings
- Succeeded by: Khaleel Anderson

Personal details
- Born: September 22, 1969 (age 57) Queens, New York, U.S.
- Party: Democratic
- Spouse: Eric DeBerry
- Children: Two
- Education: Binghamton University; Albany Law School
- Profession: Politician; judge

Michele R. Titus is an American politician and jurist from Queens, New York who has served as a New York City Civil Court Judge since January 2020. A Democrat, Titus previously represented District 31 in the New York State Assembly from 2002 to 2020.

== Biography ==
Titus is a lifelong resident of Queens and graduated from John Adams High School. She received a B.A. degree in political science from Binghamton University (State University of New York) in 1990. Titus earned her J.D. from the Albany Law School in 1993 and was admitted to the New York State Bar in 1994.

Before her election to the Assembly, Titus served as Chief of Staff to Senator Ada Smith and an executive director for the New York State Black and Puerto Rican Legislative Caucus. She had previously been an attorney for the New York City Board of Education. She has also been, at various times, a member of the staff of the Consumer Frauds Bureau of the New York State Attorney General's Office as well as the Integrity Bureau for the Queens County District Attorney's office.

A Democrat, Titus was first elected to the State Assembly in a special election held on April 16, 2002 to replace Assembly member Pauline Rhodd-Cummings, who died while in office. Titus also won the general election that November with 86 percent of the vote. She ran uncontested in the 2008 and 2010 general elections. The district comprised Far Rockaway, Rosedale, Laurelton, Springfield Gardens, South Ozone Park and South Richmond Hill. She served on several standing committees, including Children and Families, Codes, Judiciary, Small Business and Local Governments, among others. In 2017, Titus made headlines when she and her husband, Eric DeBerry, sued the state's Unified Court System. The suit alleged that DeBerry had been wrongfully terminated from his job as a court officer; it included a claim that the defendant's actions had affected the couple's sex life.

On November 5, 2019, Titus was elected as a New York City Civil Court Judge. She took office in January 2020, stepping down from her Assembly seat.

New York State Assembly
Preceded by Pauline Rhodd-Cummings	New York State Assembly, 31st District; 2002–2020	Succeeded by Khaleel Anderson
