= Howard Beach =

Neighborhood in New York City

- Neighborhood in Queens
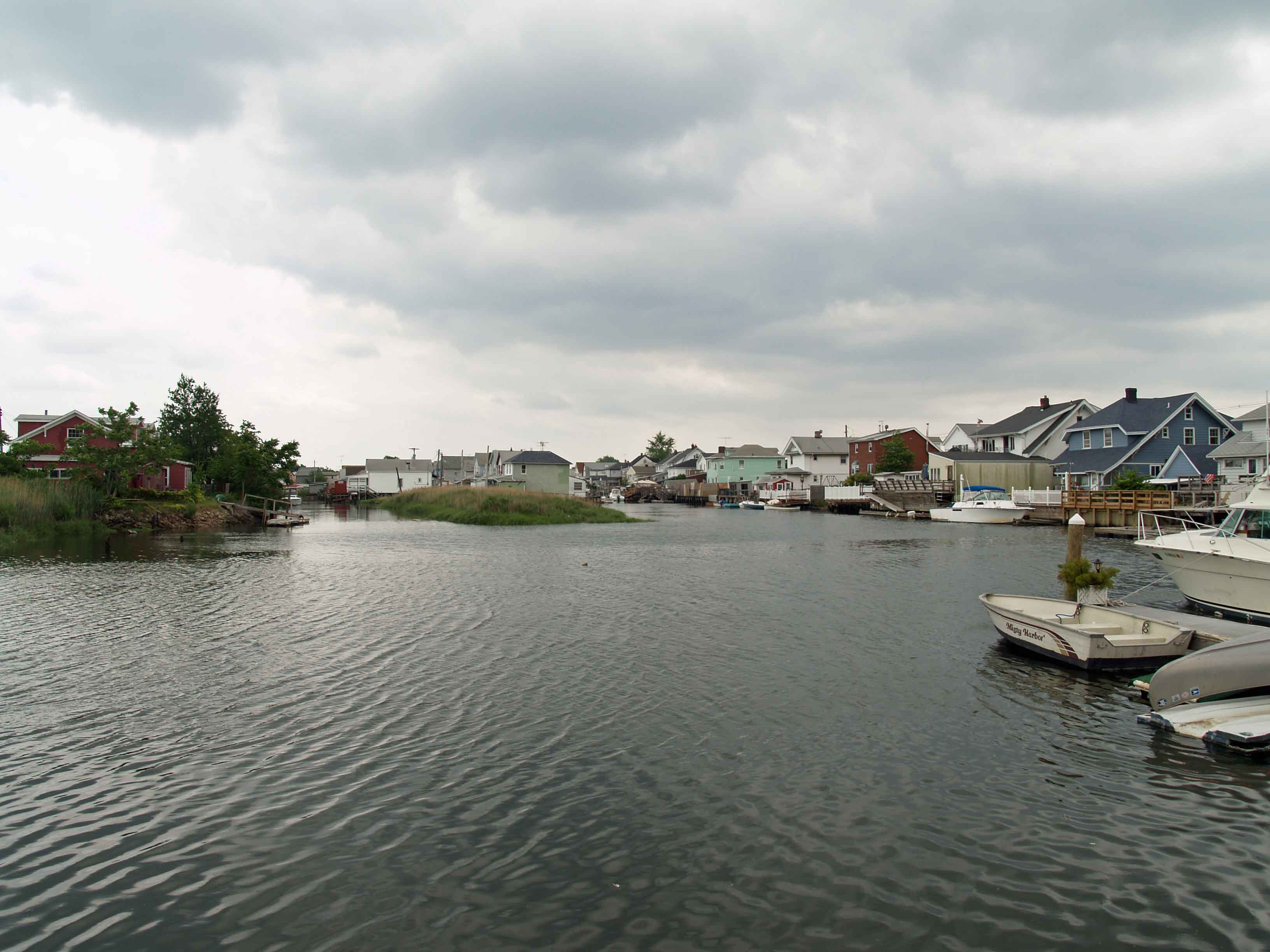
- Homes on Hawtree Creek
- Location within New York City
- Coordinates: 40.658°N 73.840°W
- Country: United States
- State: New York
- City: New York City
- County/Borough: Queens
- Community District: Queens 10
- Named for: William J. Howard

Population (2020)
  - Total: 27,320

Economics
  - Median income: $91,175
- Time zone: UTC−05:00 (EST)
  - Summer (DST): UTC−04:00 (EDT)
- ZIP Code: 11414
- Area codes: 718, 347, 929, and 917

Howard Beach is a neighborhood in the southwestern portion of the New York City borough of Queens. It is bordered to the north by the Belt Parkway and Conduit Avenue in Ozone Park, to the south by Jamaica Bay in Broad Channel, to the east by 102nd–104th Streets in South Ozone Park, and to the west by 75th Street in East New York, Brooklyn. The area consists mostly of low-rise single-family detached houses.

Howard Beach is located in Queens Community District 10 and its ZIP Code is 11414. It is patrolled by the New York City Police Department's 106th Precinct. Politically, Howard Beach is represented by the New York City Council's 32nd District.

== History ==
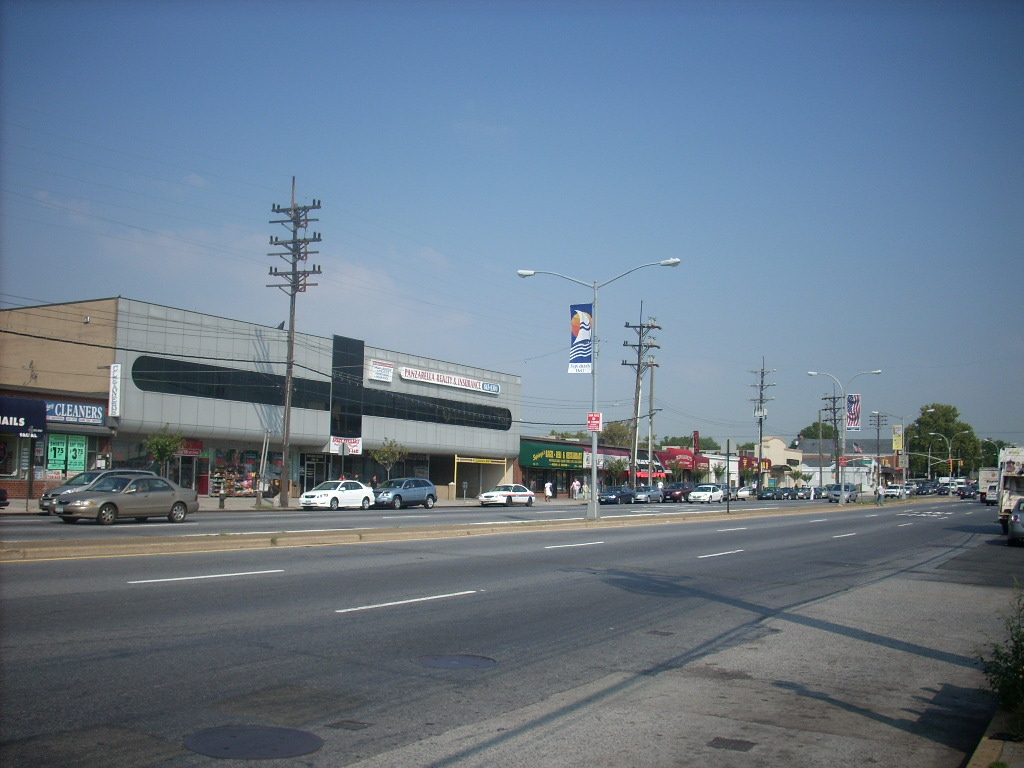
Cross Bay Boulevard

=== Early development ===
Howard Beach was established in 1897 by William J. Howard, a Brooklyn glove manufacturer who operated a 150-acre (61 ha) goat farm on meadow land near Aqueduct Racetrack as a source of skin for kid gloves. In 1897, he bought more land and filled it in. In the following year, he built 18 cottages. He opened a hotel near the water, which he ran until it was destroyed by fire in October 1907. Gradually, he bought more land. In 1909, he formed the Howard Estates Development Company. He dredged and filled the land until he was able to accumulate 500 acres (200 ha) by 1914. He laid out several streets, water mains and gas mains, and built 35 houses that were priced in the $2,500–$5,000 range.

The Long Island Rail Road established a station named Ramblersville in 1905 and a Post Office by the same name opened soon thereafter. A casino, beach, and fishing pier were added in 1915 and the name of the neighborhood was changed to Howard Beach on April 6, 1916. Development continued and ownership was expanded to a group of investors who sold lots for about $690 each starting in 1922. Development, however, was limited to the areas east of Cross Bay Boulevard near the LIRR station now known as Bernard Coleman Memorial Square (then Lilly Place). The rest of Howard Beach consisted of empty marsh land except for the area to the south of Coleman Square, centered around Russell and 102nd Streets, which consisted of many small fishing bungalows that dotted alongside Hawtree Creek and Jamaica Bay. This area of Howard Beach retained the name Ramblersville. In 1919, the LIRR established opened the Hamilton Beach station, located about a quarter-mile south of the Howard Beach station at Coleman Square.

After World War II, Queens and Long Island experienced a significant suburban building boom. The marshland west of Cross Bay Boulevard was filled in, paving the way for the construction of numerous Cape Cod and High Ranch-style homes on 50-by-100-foot (15 by 30 m) and 60-by-100-foot (18 by 30 m) lots. This area was developed as Rockwood Park to the north and Spring Park to the south, together comprising what would be known as New Howard Beach, while the area east of the boulevard became known as Old Howard Beach.

In the early 1950s, farmland north of Rockwood Park was transformed with the addition of red-brick, two-story garden-style cooperative apartments, six-story co-op and condo buildings, and private two-family homes. This new neighborhood was named Lindenwood. Development continued through the 1960s and 1970s, with Cross Bay Boulevard emerging as the primary shopping district for the area.

In the 1990s and 2000s, many older homes in the neighborhood were demolished and replaced with McMansions.

=== Post-1980s ===
==== Hate crimes ====
In 1986 and 2005, Howard Beach became the site of two widely publicized anti-Black hate crimes.

On December 20, 1986, Michael Griffith, a 23-year-old black man, was killed in Howard Beach following a racial attack. Griffith, along with Cedric Sandiford and Timothy Grimes, sought assistance in Howard Beach after their car broke down on Cross Bay Boulevard. They were attacked at New Park Pizza by a group of White youths, who severely beat Griffith and Sandiford. Fleeing the assault, Griffith ran onto the Belt Parkway and was struck and killed by a car. New York City Mayor Ed Koch compared the attack to a lynching.

Black civil rights activists organized protests in Howard Beach and surrounding neighborhoods, calling for boycotts of White-owned businesses. During protests, mostly black marchers carried signs comparing Howard Beach to apartheid-era South Africa, while White residents displayed racist signs. Three local teenagers—Jon Lester, Scott Kern, and Jason Ladone—were convicted of manslaughter, while another assailant was acquitted.

On June 29, 2005, a group of local White men in Howard Beach attacked three black men with baseball bats, resulting in one victim being hospitalized with serious injuries. Police arrested two of the attackers, including Nicholas Minucci, who claimed the victims had attempted to rob him. Minucci, 20, was found guilty on June 10, 2006 of robbery and the racist attack of Glenn Moore, during which he used a racial slur. On July 17, 2006, Minucci was sentenced to 15 years in prison.

==== Hurricane Sandy ====
As Hurricane Sandy approached New York on October 28, 2012, city officials ordered the evacuation of residents in Zone A neighborhoods, including the Hamilton Beach section of Howard Beach, due to the threat of severe storm surges. Most of Howard Beach was in Zone B, where evacuation was voluntary. Many residents chose to remain, influenced by the relatively minor impact of Hurricane Irene the previous year.

On October 29, Sandy made landfall, bringing a ten-foot storm surge from Jamaica Bay that flooded Old Howard Beach, New Howard Beach, Broad Channel, the Rockaways, parts of Lindenwood, and sections of Ozone Park. The storm caused widespread destruction, including extensive damage to homes, businesses along Cross Bay Boulevard, the Howard Beach–JFK Airport subway station, and the IND Rockaway Line trestle over Jamaica Bay. Power outages lasted upwards three weeks.

After Sandy, the Federal Emergency Management Agency and the New York City Office of Emergency Management provisionally re-classified Howard Beach, along with the Brooklyn neighborhoods of Gerritsen Beach and Red Hook, as Zone A neighborhoods. The Howard Beach post office, heavily damaged during the storm, reopened on April 5, 2013, following significant repairs.

== Geography ==
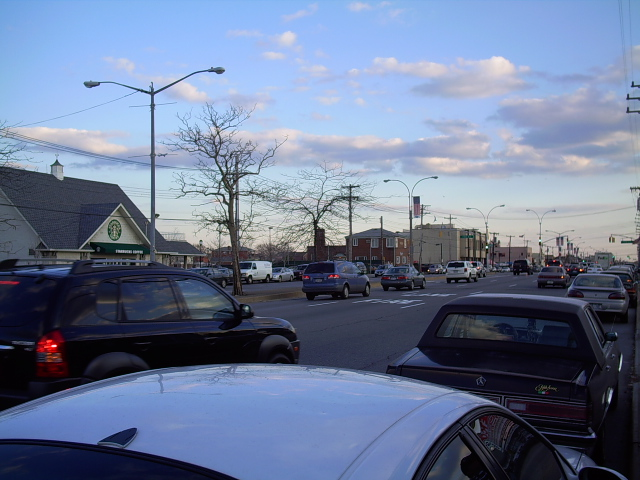
Cross Bay Boulevard

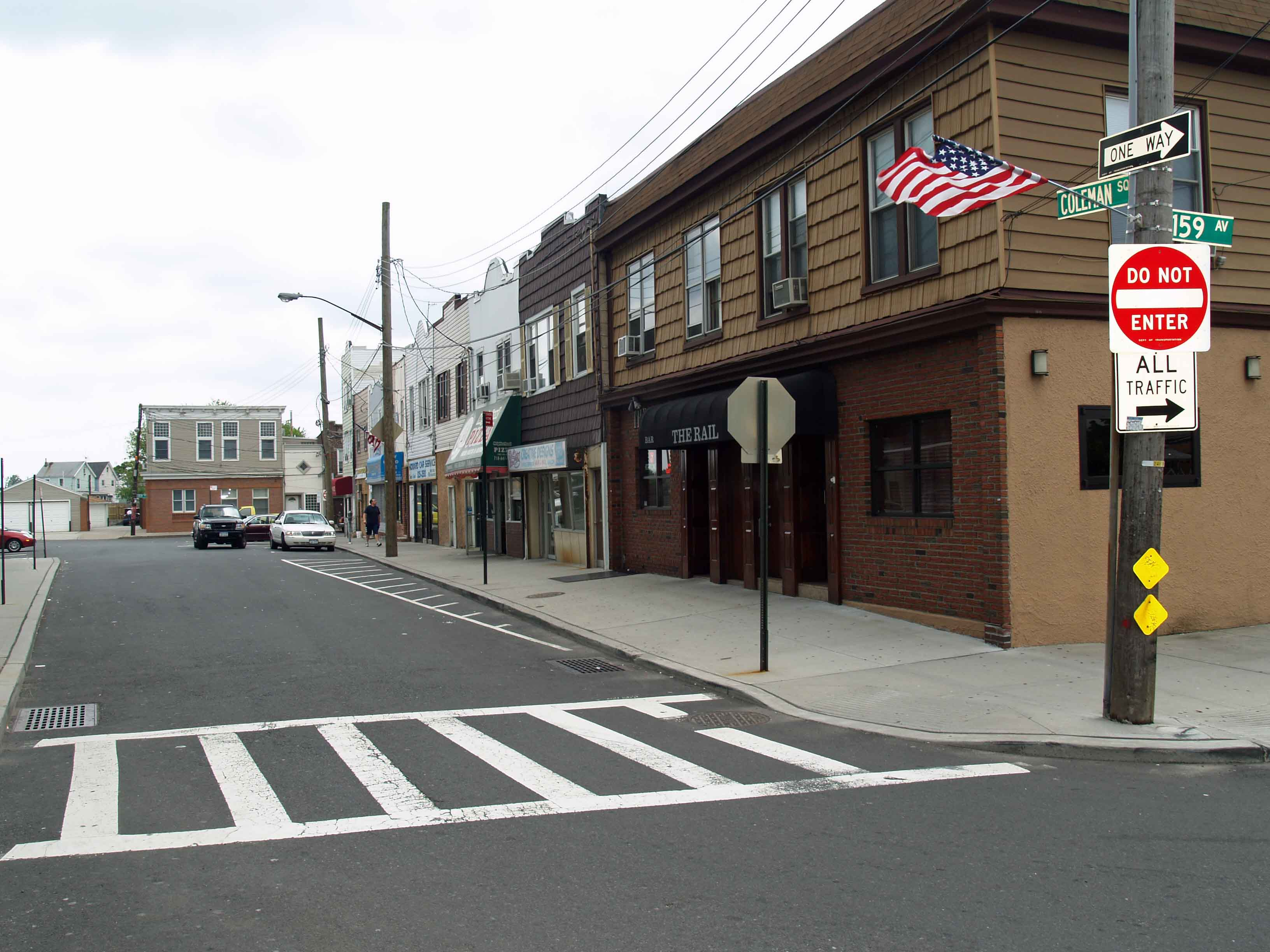
Coleman Square

Like many New York City neighborhoods, Howard Beach is composed of several smaller neighborhoods including Howard Beach, Old Howard Beach, Hamilton Beach, Ramblersville, Spring Park, Rockwood Park, Lindenwood, and Howard Park. Often, Old Howard Beach, Ramblersville, Howard Park, and Hamilton Beach are collectively referred to as "Old Howard Beach." The main section of Howard Beach is a small peninsula bordered by the Belt Parkway and Conduit Avenue to the north, Jamaica Bay to the south, Hawtree Creek to the east (separating it from Hamilton Beach), and Shellbank Basin to the west, which separates it from Cross Bay Boulevard.

Cross Bay Boulevard serves as Howard Beach's primary commercial hub. In the 1970s and 1980s, it was lined predominantly with locally owned shops and restaurants. Since the 1990s, chain stores and franchises have become more prominent along the boulevard. Former entertainment landmarks included Kiddie-Park and Cross-Bay Lanes. The Joseph P. Addabbo Memorial Bridge, named after a former U.S. Representative from the district, carries Cross Bay Boulevard over Jamaica Bay, linking mainland Queens to Broad Channel.

Bernard Coleman Memorial Square, near the Howard Beach – JFK Airport station, is a small plaza featuring a memorial honoring soldiers from Howard Beach who died in World War I, World War II, the Korean War, and the Vietnam War.

=== Hamilton Beach ===
Hamilton Beach is bordered by the 102nd Street Creek to the north, the IND Rockaway Line tracks and JFK Airport to the east, Hawtree Creek to the west, and Jamaica Bay to the south. Before incorporation, Hamilton Beach was characterized by dirt roads, bungalow-style homes, and the absence of a sewer system. Often referred to as West Hamilton Beach, it is one of the few New York City communities with its own volunteer fire department. East Hamilton Beach, once located on the east side of the Long Island Rail Road tracks, was demolished in the 1940s to allow for the expansion of Idlewild Airport (now JFK Airport). The neighborhood has no connection to Hamilton Beach Brands.

Until June 27, 1955, Hamilton Beach had a station on the LIRR's Rockaway Beach Branch. The station was closed when much of the branch was sold to the New York City Transit Authority. The community consists of one main road, 104th Street, with ten dead-end blocks connected to it, surrounded mostly by water. There is a single vehicular entrance and two pedestrian access points: a boardwalk linking the Howard Beach-JFK Airport station at Coleman Square to 104th Street, and the Hawtree Basin pedestrian bridge, which connects Hamilton Beach to Old Howard Beach.

Hamilton Beach features a small park at its southern end, including a 200-foot baseball field, a handball court, a jungle gym, and a beach. Gateways Hamilton Beach Park, located south of 165th Avenue, serves as the final stop for the Q11 bus. Since the early 21st century, housing development in the area has increased.

=== Lindenwood ===
Lindenwood, a section of Howard Beach, was developed in the 1950s and 1960s on landfill property and is considered part of New Howard Beach. The neighborhood features six-story orange- and red-brick apartment buildings constructed in the early to mid-1960s, smaller red-brick "garden apartments" built in the 1950s (visible from the Belt Parkway), and two-family homes, some attached, built in the 1960s. High-rise apartment buildings are primarily co-ops (red brick) or condominiums (orange brick), including Heritage House East and West, among the first condominium apartments in New York State. Additional townhouses near the Brooklyn border have been constructed since the 1970s. Many former playgrounds around apartment buildings have since been converted into sitting areas, with restrictions such as no dogs allowed.

At the heart of Lindenwood is P.S. 232, now known as the Walter Ward School, named after a longtime local City Councilman. The Lindenwood Shopping Center features a supermarket and about 20 stores. A second supermarket, "The Village," opened in the early 1970s but later housed a mall, flea market, bingo hall, private school, and ultimately became a walk-in medical center. Another small strip mall is located on Linden Boulevard, next to the Lindenwood Diner.

Historically, Lindenwood's population was predominantly Jewish, Italian, and Hispanic. When the Jewish population was larger, Temple Judea on 153rd Avenue and 80th Street served the community. The building was later converted into apartments after the synagogue merged with the Howard Beach Jewish Center in Rockwood Park. The neighborhood once had two pool clubs, later replaced by walk-up apartments and townhouses, including one near P.S. 232 that was redeveloped in 1980. A tennis bubble at 153rd Avenue and 79th Street was built around 1980.

=== Old Howard Beach ===
Old Howard Beach is a section of Howard Beach that lies between Shellbank Basin and Hawtree Creek to the east of Cross Bay Boulevard. Coleman Square, Wetzel Triangle and Frank M. Charles Park are located in Old Howard Beach. The area is locally referred to as "Old Howard Beach" since it was the original place in which founder William Howard built his famous hotel, and later the area's first houses in the 1920s. The current housing in Old Howard Beach consists of several different types of houses. Those located near the former Howard Beach General Hospital (built in 1962) are mainly 1950s and 1960s detached two-family homes, while the areas near Coleman Square, Frank M. Charles Park, and Shellbank Basin contain primarily single-family homes. The Q11 bus serves the neighborhood.

=== Ramblersville ===
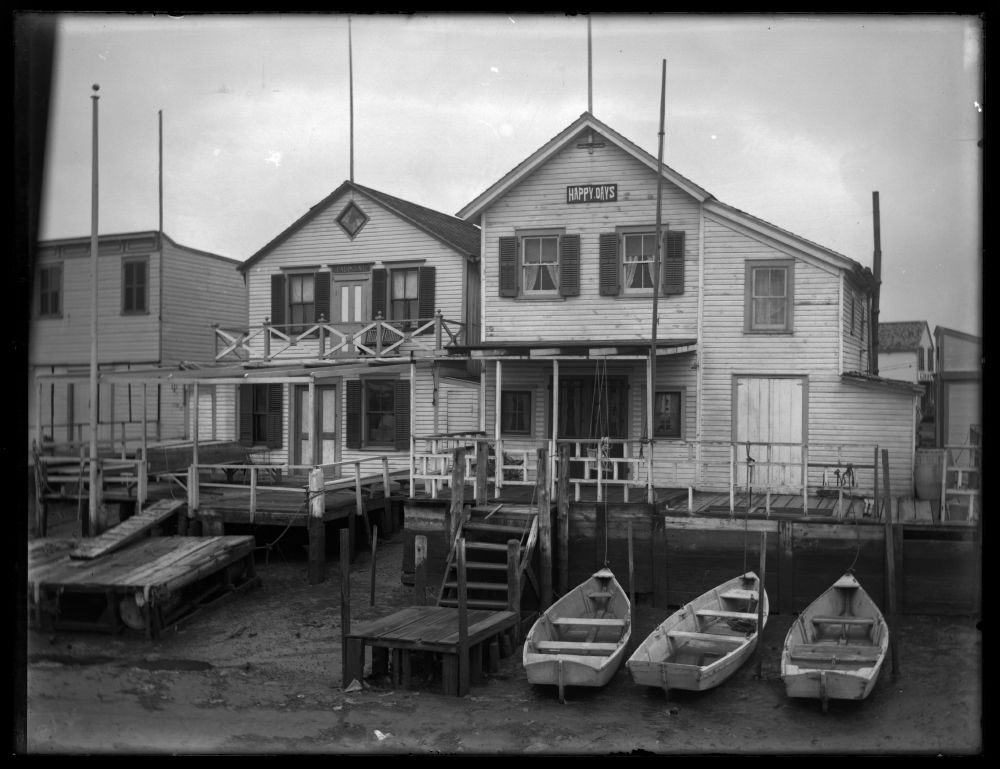
c. 1900 photograph of Ramblersville by William M. Vander Weyde (1871–1929)

Ramblersville is a small neighborhood of about a dozen blocks between Hawtree Creek and JFK Airport. It is nearly surrounded by waterways leading into Jamaica Bay. The neighborhood is bordered by 160th Avenue to the north, Hawtree Creek to the west (across which lies Old Howard Beach), the IND Rockaway Line to the east (beyond which are Bergen Basin and JFK Airport), and 102nd Street Creek to the south. 102nd Street crosses the creek to connect to Hamilton Beach at Russell Street. The neighborhood spans approximately 1,000 feet (300 m) on each side, and lacks the rectangular street grid of the surrounding neighborhoods.

Ramblersville is purportedly the oldest neighborhood in what later became Howard Beach and once considered itself independent of New York City when the city was unified. A 1905 Washington Post article described the neighborhood as having houses built on stilts, with a population of 1,000 in the summer and a dozen in the winter. In 1962, the city replaced the neighborhood’s private water mains; at that time, the population consisted of approximately 130 families.

Fishing was a significant industry in the neighborhood. In 2001, The New York Times compared Ramblersville to a fishing village, having pebbled streets and wooden bungalows built on pilings, surrounded by tall grass and marshy fields.

North of Ramblersville is 159th Drive, also called Remsen Place, named after Jeromus Remsen, an American Revolutionary War officer. This area was historically known as "Remsen's Landing." Before 1916, the entire area now known as Howard Beach was commonly referred to as Ramblersville, including Hamilton Beach to the south and Old Howard Beach to the west. The Howard Beach – JFK Airport station was originally the Ramblersville Station of the Long Island Rail Road.

Ramblersville is the smallest neighborhood in New York City in terms of real estate per square foot.

=== Rockwood Park ===
Rockwood Park primarily consists of single-family detached houses. Often referred to as part of "New Howard" by local residents, it is bounded by 78th and 92nd Streets (running north-south) and 156th and 165th Avenues (running east-west). Public transportation in the area is provided by the Q41 and Q21 bus routes. To the west of 78th Street, the neighborhood's westernmost boundary, lies Spring Creek Park, marking the border between Brooklyn and Queens.

The area remained undeveloped through the first half of the 1900s. After World War II, marshland west of Cross Bay Boulevard was filled in, leading to the construction of Cape Cod-style houses. In the 1960s and 1970s, high ranch-style houses were built. The area became associated with upscale living and was home to notable figures, including Gambino crime family boss John Gotti, who lived on 85th Street. Starting in the late 1980s and continuing through the 2000s, many original Cape Cod-style homes were replaced with McMansions.

Folk singer Woody Guthrie also lived in the neighborhood, at 159-13 85th Street, after moving from Coney Island.

== Demographics ==
Howard Beach, which is stipulated as Neighborhood Tabulation Area QN1003 by the New York City Department of City Planning, had 27,320 inhabitants based on data from the 2020 United States Census. This was an increase of 1,172 persons (4.48%) from the 26,148 counted in 2010. The neighborhood had a population density of 22.6 inhabitants per acre (14,500/sq mi; 5,600/km^{2}).

The racial makeup of the neighborhood was 62.7% (17,123) White (Non-Hispanic), 3.1% (842) Black (Non-Hispanic), 5.8% (1,584) Asian, 1.1% (297) from other races, and 2.2% (609) from two or more races. Hispanic or Latino of any race were 25.1% (6,865) of the population.

According to the 2020 United States Census, South Ozone Park has many cultural communities of over 1,000 inhabitants. This include residents who identify as Dominican, Puerto Rican, German, Irish, and Italian. 18.9% of the residents in South Ozone park were foreign born.

Most inhabitants are higher-aged adults: 19.7% are between the ages of between 0–19, 23.3% between 20-39, 26.7% between 40-59, and 30.3% older than 60. 65.3% of the households had at least one family present.

As of 2017, the median household income in Community Board 10, which comprises Howard Beach, southern Ozone Park, and South Ozone Park was $73,891. In 2018, an estimated 19% of South Ozone Park and Howard Beach residents lived in poverty, compared to 19% in all of Queens and 20% in all of New York City. One in ten residents (10%) were unemployed, compared to 8% in Queens and 9% in New York City. Rent burden, or the percentage of residents who have difficulty paying their rent, is 56% in Howard Beach and South Ozone Park, higher than the boroughwide and citywide rates of 53% and 51% respectively. Based on this calculation, as of 2018, South Ozone Park and Howard Beach are considered to be high-income relative to the rest of the city and not gentrifying.

== Politics ==
Howard Beach is part of the 15th State Senate district, represented by Joseph Addabbo Jr., and the 23rd State Assembly district, represented by Stacey Pheffer Amato. It is part of District 32 in the New York City Council, represented by Joann Ariola.

Following redistricting in 2012, the neighborhood was split between the 5th and 8th congressional districts. The 5th District covered the parts of Howard Beach east of 104th Street and the 8th District covered the rest of the neighborhood west of 104th Street. These districts were represented by Gregory Meeks and Hakeem Jeffries respectively, as of 2025.

== Police and crime ==
Howard Beach, southern Ozone Park, and South Ozone Park are patrolled by the 106th Precinct of the NYPD, located at 103-53 101st Street. The 106th Precinct ranked 26th safest out of 69 patrol areas for per-capita crime in 2010. The rate of car thefts is high because of the area's proximity to the Belt Parkway. As of 2018, with a non-fatal assault rate of 32 per 100,000 people, Howard Beach and South Ozone Park's rate of violent crimes per capita is less than that of the city as a whole. The incarceration rate of 381 per 100,000 people is lower than that of the city as a whole.

The 106th Precinct has a lower crime rate than in the 1990s, with crimes across all categories having decreased by 81.3% between 1990 and 2018. In 2018, there were 6 murders, 16 rapes, 183 robberies, 246 felony assaults, 133 burglaries, 502 grand larcenies, and 97 grand larcenies auto recorded in the precinct.

== Fire safety ==
Howard Beach contains a New York City Fire Department (FDNY) fire station, Engine Co. 331/Ladder Co. 173, at 158-99 Cross Bay Boulevard.

Hamilton Beach is served by the West Hamilton Beach Volunteer Fire Department, which has Engine 2 (Brush Unit), Engine 4, Engine 6, Ambulance 947 & 947-1, and two Chiefs vehicles, as well as a water pump.

== Health ==
As of 2018, preterm births are more common in Howard Beach and South Ozone Park than in other places citywide, though births to teenage mothers are less common. In Howard Beach and South Ozone Park, there were 97 preterm births per 1,000 live births (compared to 87 per 1,000 citywide), and 14.2 births to teenage mothers per 1,000 live births (compared to 19.3 per 1,000 citywide). Howard Beach and South Ozone Park have a low population of residents who are uninsured. In 2018, this population of uninsured residents was estimated to be 8%, lower than the citywide rate of 12%.

The concentration of fine particulate matter, the deadliest type of air pollutant, in Howard Beach and South Ozone Park is 0.0068 milligrams per cubic metre (6.8×10^{−9} oz/ft^{3}), less than the city average. Twelve percent of Howard Beach and South Ozone Park residents are smokers, which is lower than the city average of 14% of residents being smokers. In Howard Beach and South Ozone Park, 27% of residents are obese, 19% are diabetic, and 34% have high blood pressure—compared to the citywide averages of 22%, 8%, and 23% respectively. In addition, 21% of children are obese, compared to the citywide average of 20%.

Eighty-three percent of residents eat some fruits and vegetables every day, which is less than the city's average of 87%. In 2018, 77% of residents described their health as "good", "very good", or "excellent", about equal to the city's average of 78%. For every supermarket in Howard Beach and South Ozone Park, there are eight bodegas.

The nearest major hospitals are Brookdale University Hospital and Medical Center in Brooklyn and Jamaica Hospital in Jamaica.

== Post offices and ZIP Code ==
Howard Beach is covered by the ZIP Code 11414. The United States Postal Service operates two post offices nearby: the Station A post office at 160-50 Cross Bay Boulevard and the Station B post office at 102-12 159th Avenue.

== Education ==
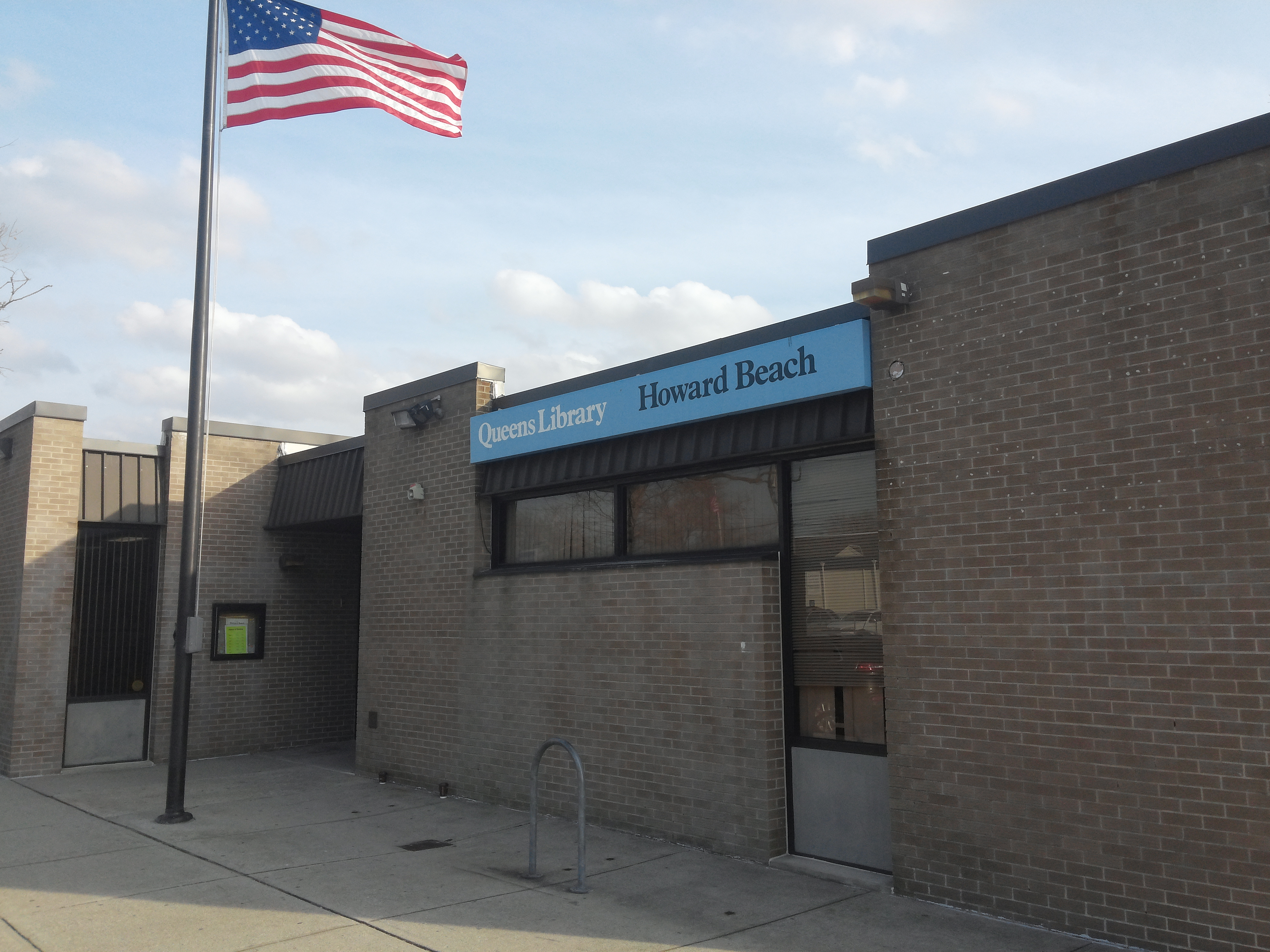
Queens Public Library, Howard Beach branch

Howard Beach and South Ozone Park generally have a lower rate of college-educated residents than the rest of the city as of 2018. While 28% of residents age 25 and older have a college education or higher, 23% have less than a high school education and 49% are high school graduates or have some college education. By contrast, 39% of Queens residents and 43% of city residents have a college education or higher. The percentage of Howard Beach and South Ozone Park students excelling in math rose from 33% in 2000 to 61% in 2011, and reading achievement rose from 37% to 48% during the same time period.

Howard Beach and South Ozone Park's rate of elementary school student absenteeism is less than the rest of New York City. In Howard Beach and South Ozone Park, 18% of elementary school students missed twenty or more days per school year, lower than the citywide average of 20%. Additionally, 82% of high school students in Howard Beach and South Ozone Park graduate on time, more than the citywide average of 75%.

=== Schools ===
- PS 146 The Howard Beach School
- PS 207 The Rockwood Park School
- PS 232 The Walter Ward School
- St. Helens Catholic Academy K–8 (Roman Catholic Diocese of Brooklyn)

Before the public elementary schools changed to K-8 schools, residents of Howard Beach that attended PS 207, PS 232 or PS 146 then went to Junior High School 202 (Robert H. Goddard Junior High School) for grades 7–8. It is located on the northwest corner of Conduit Boulevard and Lafayette Place, and a footbridge crosses over Conduit Boulevard, allowing students from southern Howard Beach to attend the school. Some 9th graders also attended JHS 202.

For grades 9–12, residents could attend their zoned school which is John Adams High School in nearby Ozone Park. Others attended specialty high schools such as Beach Channel High School in Rockaway Park, or Catholic high schools such as Christ the King, St. Francis Prep, Stella Maris or Archbishop Molloy.

In July 2020, Our Lady of Grace Catholic School made the announcement that it would no longer be operating, as the Diocese took over the property and decided to close the educational component due to financial strain as an indirect result of the COVID-19 pandemic.

=== Library ===
The Queens Public Library operates the Howard Beach branch at 92-06 156th Avenue.

== Transportation ==
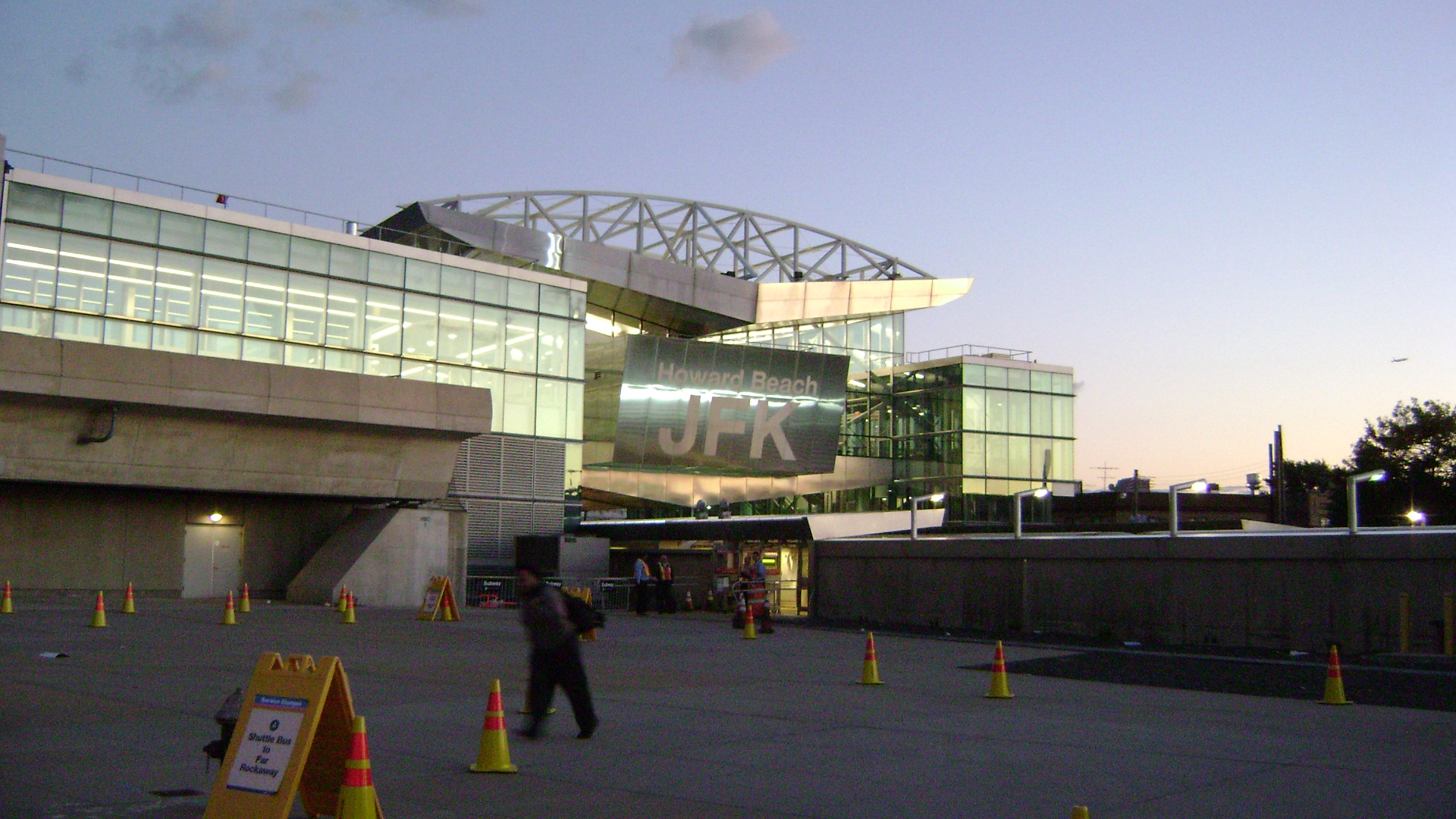
The structure of the Howard Beach–JFK Airport station

The New York City Subway's Howard Beach–JFK Airport station, on the IND Rockaway Line (A train) was formerly a Long Island Rail Road station on the Rockaway Beach Branch. Frequent fires on the trestle to Broad Channel forced the LIRR to file Chapter 11 bankruptcy protection in the 1950s, which allowed New York City Transit to purchase the line in 1956. The station provides a connection between the A train and Howard Beach JFK AirTrain route. Prior to the AirTrain JFK's opening, the Port Authority provided a free shuttle bus to the terminals at JFK Airport.

The MTA Bus Company provides service throughout Howard Beach on the Q11, Q41, Q52 SBS and Q53 SBS local buses and the QM15, QM16 and QM17 express buses. In addition, New York City Transit’s B15 bus makes one stop in Lindenwood before heading to JFK Airport.

== Notable people ==
Notable current and former residents of Howard Beach include:

- Gia Allemand (1983–2013), actress, model and reality television contestant
- Victor Amuso (born 1934), mobster who is boss of the Lucchese crime family
- Vito Antuofermo (born 1953), former boxer and actor
- Marco Battaglia (born 1973), former American football tight end in the National Football League
- Gene Borrello (born 1984), author, motivational speaker, podcaster, former Bonanno crime family associate, led a crew out of Howard Beach
- DJ Skribble (born 1968), DJ, producer, remixer, radio personality and TV actor
- Vitas Gerulaitis (1954–1994), professional tennis player
- Keith Gottfried (born 1966), former General Counsel and Chief Legal Officer of the U.S. Department of Housing and Urban Development and senior member of the administration of President George W. Bush, spent much of his childhood as a resident of Howard Beach
- John Gotti (1940–2002), Gambino crime family head, was a resident of 85th Street in Howard Beach
- Victoria Gotti (born 1962), John's daughter, who starred in Growing Up Gotti
- Woody Guthrie (1912–1967), folk music legend (son Arlo Guthrie's music is frequently copyrighted to "Howard Beach Music, Inc.")
- Rick Hearst (born 1965), soap-opera actor
- James Maritato (born 1972), professional wrestler
- George Martin (born 1953), defensive end who played in the NFL for the New York Giants
- Joseph Massino (1943–2023), Bonanno crime family boss and known as the "Last Godfather"
- Joey Ramone (1951–2001) and his brother Mickey Leigh (born 1954) lived in Howard Beach as children
- Pia Toscano (born 1988), top 10 contestant on American Idol Season 10
- Karina Vetrano (1986–2016), Howard Beach resident who was murdered in Spring Creek Park

== In popular culture ==
- A 1989 TV movie was made based on the 1986 racial incident entitled Howard Beach: Making a Case for Murder.
- In the 1989 Spike Lee movie Do the Right Thing, in a riot scene near the end of the film, a chant rises up: "Howard Beach! Howard Beach! Howard Beach!" referencing the murder of Michael Griffith. This immediately follows a scene wherein one of the main characters, Radio Raheem, a young Black man, is killed by police using excessive force to break up a fight.
- On The Chris Rock Show, comedian Chris Rock proposed renaming Cross Bay Boulevard after Tupac Shakur, asking the predominantly white residents of the neighborhood to sign a petition.

== See also ==
- The Hole, New York
