= Gregory Meeks =

American politician (born 1953)

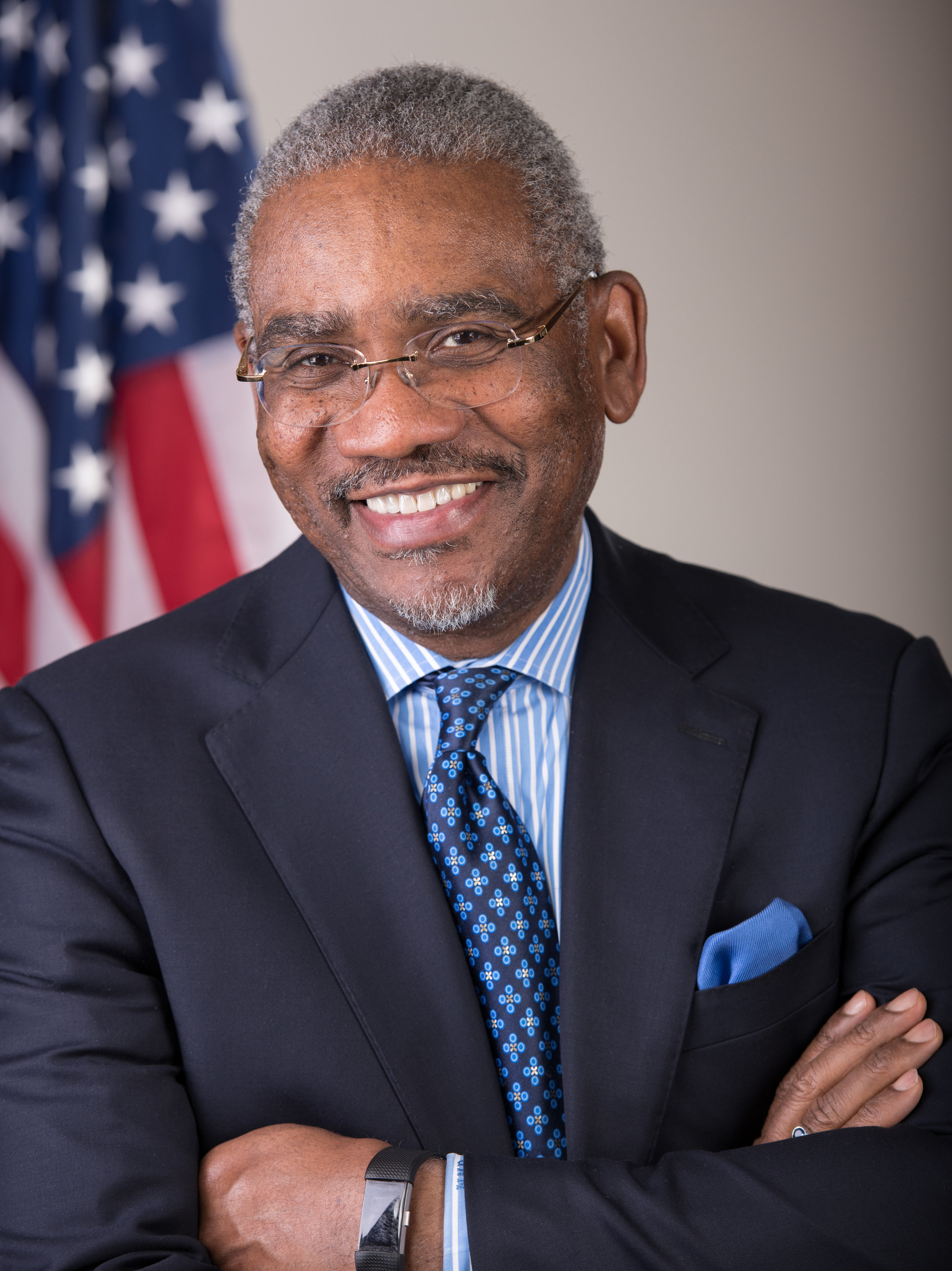
- Official portrait, 2018

Ranking Member of the House Foreign Affairs Committee
- Incumbent
- Assumed office January 3, 2023
- Preceded by: Michael McCaul

Chair of the House Foreign Affairs Committee
- In office January 3, 2021 – January 3, 2023
- Preceded by: Eliot Engel
- Succeeded by: Michael McCaul

Member of the U.S. House of Representatives from New York's 5th district
- Incumbent
- Assumed office February 3, 1998 (Note: Meeks's official service begins on the date of the special election, while he was not sworn in until February 5, 1998.)
- Preceded by: Floyd Flake
- Constituency: 6th district (1998–2013); 5th district (2013–present)

Member of the New York State Assembly from the 31st district
- In office January 1, 1993 – January 3, 1998
- Preceded by: Anthony S. Seminerio
- Succeeded by: Pauline Rhodd-Cummings

Personal details
- Born: Gregory Weldon Meeks; September 25, 1953 (age 73) New York City, New York, U.S.
- Party: Democratic
- Spouse: Simone-Marie Meeks
- Children: 3
- Education: Adelphi University (BA); Howard University (JD)
- Website: House website Campaign website
- Meeks's voice Meeks opening a House Foreign Affairs Committee hearing on the UN and U.S. global leadership. Recorded June 16, 2021

Gregory Weldon Meeks (born September 25, 1953) is an American lawyer and politician who has been a U.S. representative from New York since 1998, and since 2013, has represented the state's 5th congressional district. He is a member of the Democratic Party and chaired the House Committee on Foreign Affairs from 2021 to 2023. He still sits on the committee as ranking member. He is also the chair of the Queens County Democratic Party. He will become the dean of New York’s House delegation upon the retirements of Jerry Nadler and Nydia Velázquez in 2026.

In the last Congress, Meeks's district included most of southeastern Queens, including Jamaica, Laurelton, Rosedale, Cambria Heights, Saint Albans, Springfield Gardens, The Rockaways, and the John F. Kennedy International Airport. It was made up largely of economically diverse African-American and West Indian American communities, but also included a small part of Ozone Park and part of Howard Beach known as Old Howard Beach, both of which are predominantly middle-class Italian-American communities. He also represented much of Kew Gardens and northern Richmond Hill, as well as the largely Irish American western part of Rockaway Peninsula.

== Early life, education, and career ==
Meeks was born in East Harlem, New York City and raised in a housing project. He received his B.A. degree from Adelphi University and his J.D. degree from Howard University School of Law. He is a member of Alpha Phi Alpha fraternity. He worked as an Assistant District Attorney and for the Special Narcotics Prosecutor for the City of New York before joining the Investigations Commission on official misconduct and organized crime. He then was Supervising Judge for the New York State Workers Compensation System. Meeks was a member of the New York State Assembly (31st D.) from 1993 to 1998.

== U.S. House of Representatives ==
=== Elections ===
==== 2008 ====
Meeks was criticized for initially supporting Hillary Clinton over Barack Obama for president. His House primary election challenger was to be Ruben Wills, a former chief of staff for State Senator Shirley Huntley and an organizer for Obama. Wills said, "I was on board with Obama from Day 1; Meeks had to be dragged across the line." Some suggested that a young black political class was seeking to assert the neighborhood's power against what it saw as an older establishment, based in Harlem, that had long exercised disproportionate influence in New York City. Wills did not qualify for the ballot, so no primary election took place.

==== 2012 ====
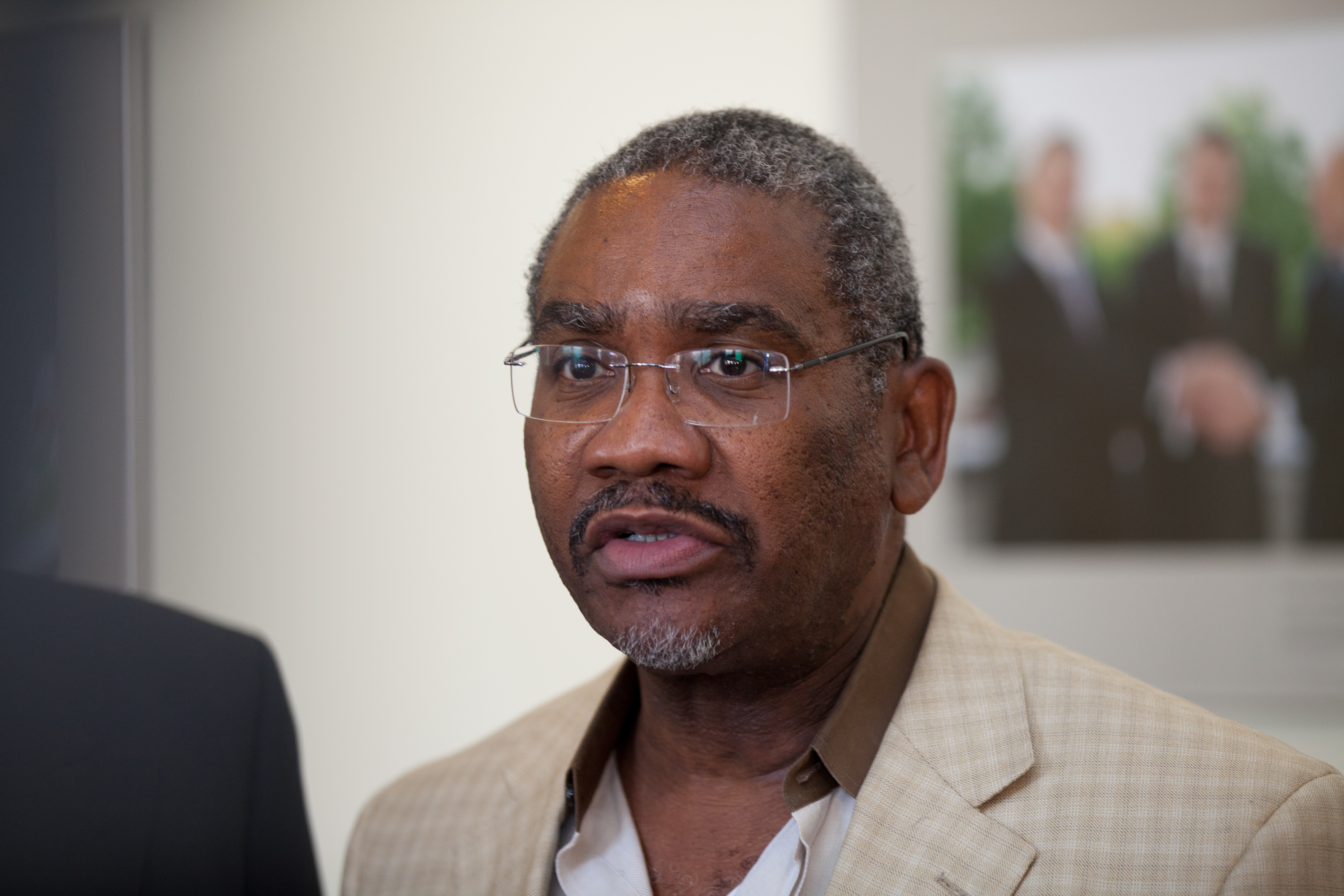
Meeks in June 2012

Citizens for Responsibility and Ethics in Washington (CREW) named Meeks one of the most corrupt members of Congress in 2011. It was subsequently reported that his continuing ethical and criminal probes would cause his premature exit from Congress, but Meeks has denied this. In October 2011, hip-hop artist and law school graduate Mike Scala announced his candidacy in the Democratic primary. Meeks won the primary and was reelected in the November general election with 90% of the vote.

=== Tenure ===
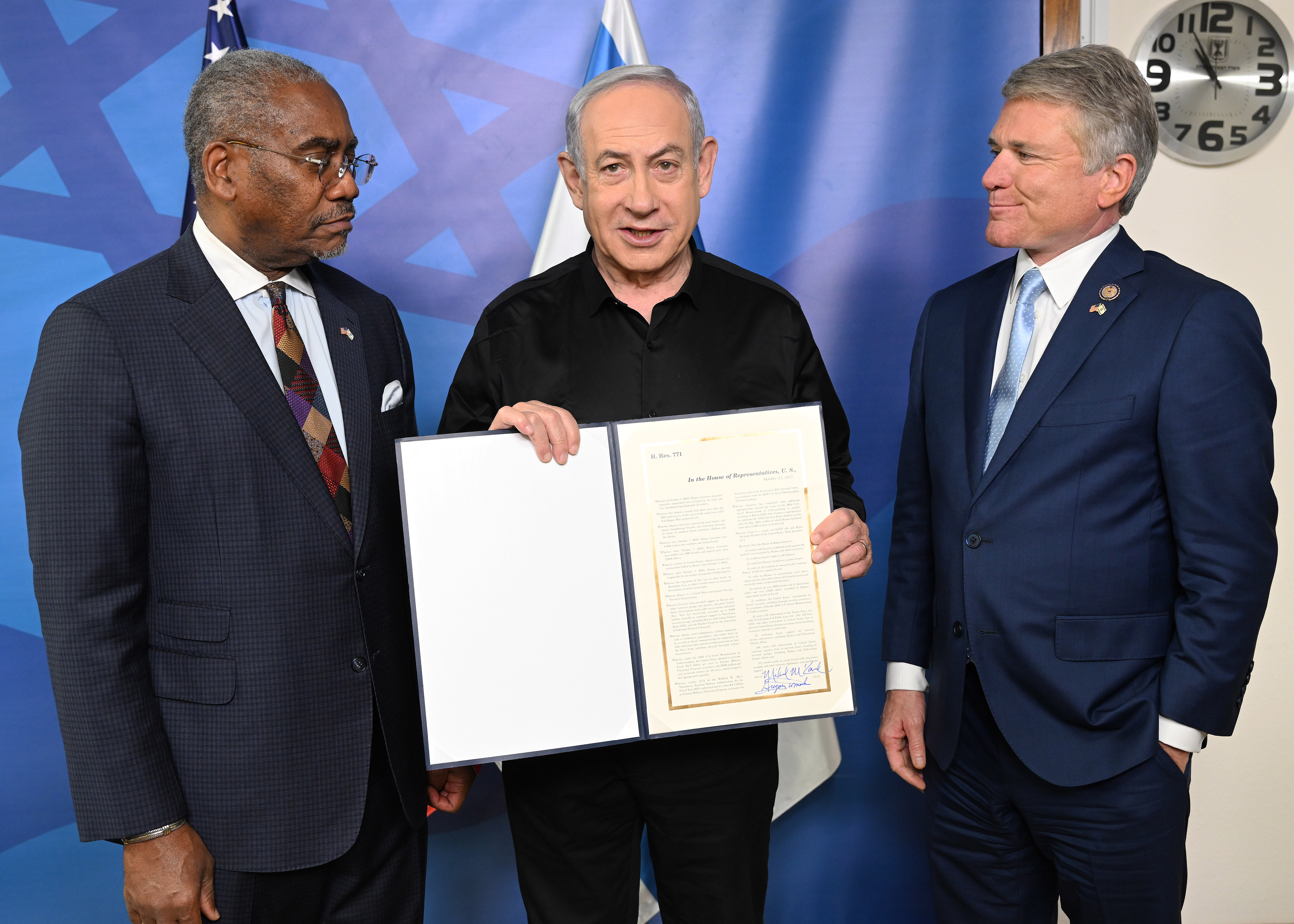
Meeks with Israeli prime minister Benjamin Netanyahu in Israel, November 12, 2023

On March 3, 2015, Meeks participated with fellow Democrats in a boycott of the speech delivered by Israeli prime minister Benjamin Netanyahu to Congress.

In July 2020, after the primary defeat of House Foreign Affairs Committee chair Eliot Engel, Meeks declared his candidacy for chair. On December 3, 2020, Meeks defeated Joaquin Castro 148-78 in a House Democratic Caucus vote.

Meeks voted with President Joe Biden's stated position 100% of the time in the 117th Congress, according to a FiveThirtyEight analysis.

In September 2026, Meeks placed a hold on a $2.8 billion weapons sale to Israel, joining Sen. Jeanne Shaheen. Meeks cited concerns over whether Netanyahu's government would use US-supplied weapons in accordance with international humanitarian law and US law.

==== SALT deductions ====
In November 2021, Meeks called for increasing the cap on SALT deductions.

==== Philippines visit ====
On August 25, 2007, Silvestre Reyes, chair of the Permanent Select Committee on Intelligence and the Armed Services Committee, and four other representatives visited American troops deployed in the southern Philippines to overview the US-Philippines relationship. Reyes headed the bipartisan delegation, which included Rodney P. Frelinghuysen, member of the Appropriations Committee and the select intelligence oversight panel; Heather Wilson of the Committee on Energy and the Intelligence Committee; Meeks; and Dutch Ruppersberger of the Appropriations and Intelligence Committees. They drove to the base of the Joint Special Operation Task Force Philippines (JSOTFP), a US-led body that trains Filipino soldiers against terror in Barangay Upper Calarian.

==== Fall of Afghanistan ====
On the day of the fall of Kabul, Meeks said in a statement that the Taliban victory was "inevitable". He also said, "It is abundantly clear that the Taliban's advance was ultimately inevitable, at least without a commitment to surge tens of thousands of U.S. troops for an unknown span of time. That is a commitment the American public has made clear it does not support."

==== 2013 CREW report ====
In 2013, Citizens for Responsibility and Ethics in Washington named Meeks as one of the most corrupt politicians in Washington. This was as a result of claims that he purchased a home for over $150,000 less than it was worth, met with former Venezuelan president Hugo Chávez on behalf of a donor, and failure to disclose a private loan on congressional financial statements.

==== Congressional auto lease ====
The New York Times reported that Meeks utilizes the option to use tax dollars to lease a car for use as a member of Congress. This option does not exist for Senate members. The lease is forgone by many members of Congress, but Meeks has held the most-expensive lease among all members. He has used tax dollars to lease a 2007 Lexus LS 460 for $998 per month. Meeks was unwilling to provide further comment when questioned by the Times about the lease arrangement, saying, "These are never lighthearted stories."

==== Malaysia visit ====
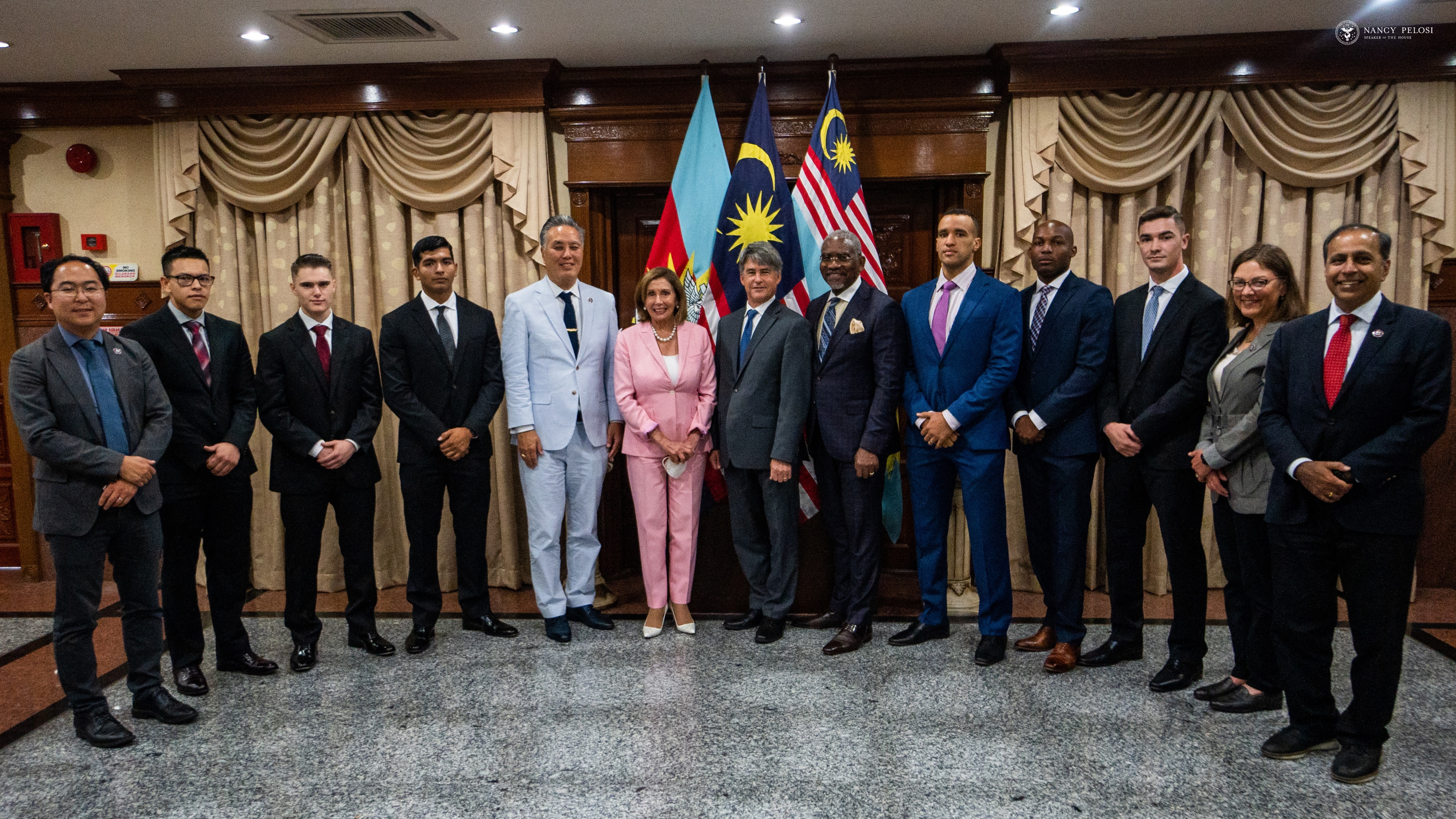
Meeks with House Speaker Pelosi at the U.S. embassy in Kuala Lumpur, Malaysia, 2022

In August 2022, Meeks traveled to Malaysia with House Speaker Nancy Pelosi and other members of Congress as part of Pelosi's Asia tour. Malaysia was their second stop after Singapore. They discussed security challenges, economic opportunities and governance priorities between Malaysia and the U.S.

==== G20 Bali summit ====
On October 6, 2022, The United States embassy at Jakarta stated that Meeks represented Pelosi and would deliver the keynote address at the G20 Bali summit's plenary session on "Effective Parliament, Dynamic Democracy". His speech discussed the importance of defending democratic values, combating climate change, strengthening food and energy security, advancing sustainable development and recovery from COVID-19, and deepening inter-parliamentary coordination to address these challenges.

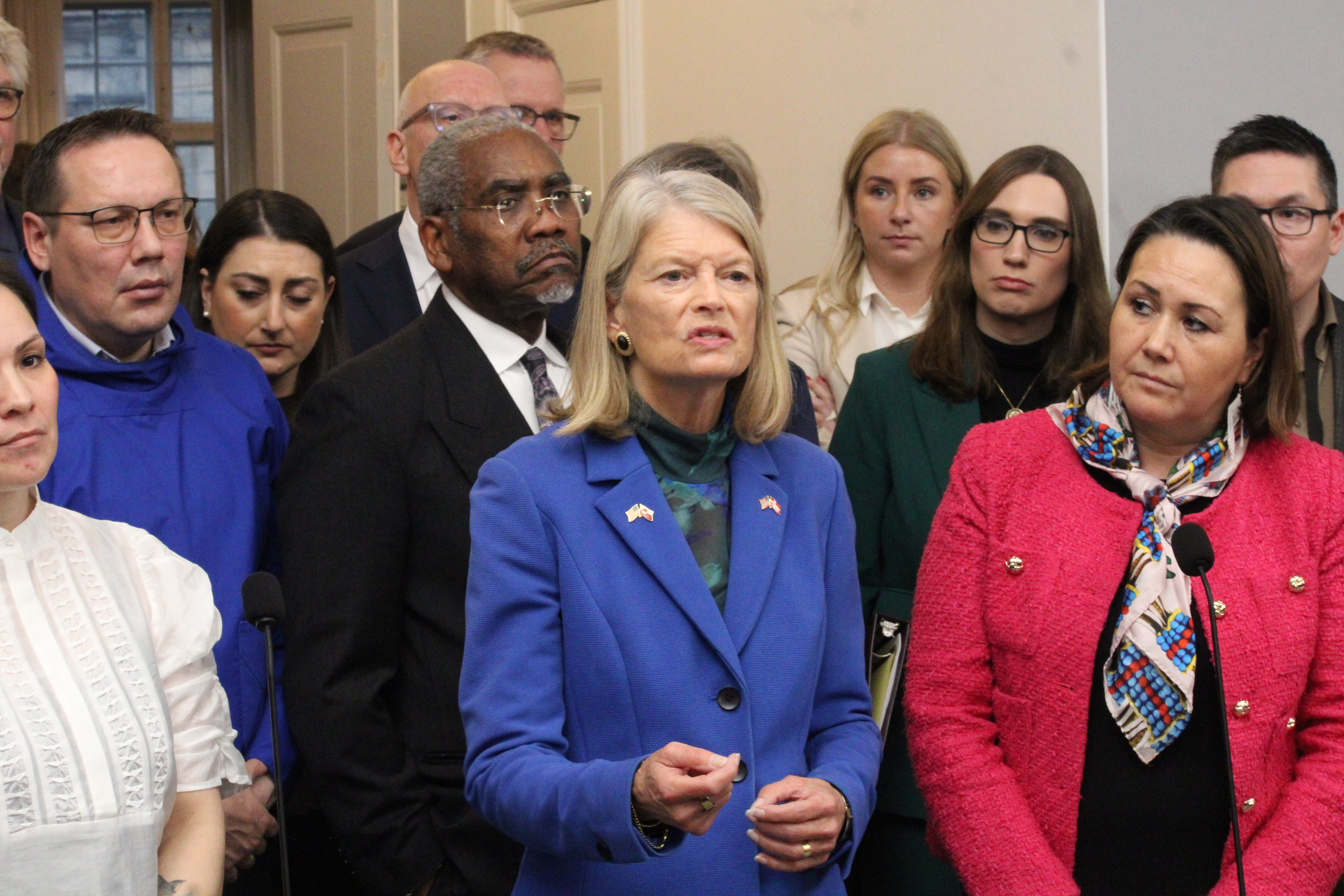
Meeks at a press conference in Copenhagen, Denmark at a visit in support of the country during the Greenland crisis, January 2026

=== Committee assignments ===
For the 119th Congress:

- Committee on Financial Services
  - Subcommittee on Capital Markets
  - Subcommittee on Financial Institutions
- Committee on Foreign Affairs (Ranking Member)

=== Caucus memberships ===
- Dialogue Caucus (Co-chair)
- Malaysia Caucus (Co-chair)
- Middle East Economic Partnership Caucus (Co-chair)
- Services Caucus (Co-chair)
- Caucus on US Russian Trade and Economic Relations (Co-chair)
- Black Maternal Health Caucus
- House Baltic Caucus
- Congressional Equality Caucus
- Congressional Asian Pacific American Caucus
- United States Congressional International Conservation Caucus
- U.S.-Japan Caucus
- Congressional Black Caucus,
- International Conservation Caucus
- New Democrat Coalition
- Afterschool Caucuses.
- Congressional Caucus on Turkey and Turkish Americans
- Congressional Taiwan Caucus

== Personal life ==
Meeks has African-American heritage. His great-grandparents lived in South Carolina when slavery was abolished. Using DNA testing, Meeks verified that his ancestry is traced to the Mende ethnicity in Sierra Leone.

== See also ==
- List of African-American United States representatives

U.S. House of Representatives
Preceded by Floyd Flake	Member of the U.S. House of Representatives from New York's 6th congressional district 1998–2013	Succeeded by Grace Meng
Preceded by Gary Ackerman	Member of the U.S. House of Representatives from New York's 5th congressional district 2013–present	Incumbent
Preceded by Eliot Engel	Chair of the House Foreign Affairs Committee; 2021–2023	Succeeded by Michael McCaul
U.S. order of precedence (ceremonial)
Preceded by Adam Smith	United States representatives by seniority 26th	Succeeded by John B. Larson
Preceded by Adam Smith	Order of precedence of the United States	Succeeded by John B. Larson
