= Shellbank Basin =

Coordinates: 40°39′16″N 73°50′16″W

Shellbank Basin is a tidal waterway in Queens, New York City. Located along the waterfront of Howard Beach, the basin separates Old Howard Beach from the surrounding communities to its west and provides access to Jamaica Bay. It is one of two principal waterways in the area, along with Hawtree Basin, and is used for recreational boating and fishing. New York City's Department of Environmental Protection has also operated a water-quality facility on the basin to reduce odors and improve aquatic conditions.

The basin was created through dredging and landfilling during the development of Howard Beach in the early 20th century. The Howard Estates Development Company, established by developer William J. Howard, dredged the basin and used material removed from it to raise surrounding marshland.

== History ==
The area surrounding Shellbank Basin was originally part of the extensive marshes and tidal wetlands bordering Jamaica Bay. Beginning in the late 19th and early 20th centuries, developer William J. Howard acquired large areas of marshland and began transforming the area into a residential and resort community. Howard established the Howard Estates Development Company in 1909, which continued the development of what became Howard Beach.

As part of this development, the Howard Estates Development Company dredged Shellbank Basin. Material removed during the dredging was used as fill to raise surrounding marshland and create developable land. The basin consequently became an important geographic feature of the developing community, separating the original Howard Beach development from the areas to its west.

The National Park Service records that Shellbank Basin was dredged in 1920 in connection with plans briefly considered by the United States Navy for construction of a submarine base. The proposed naval facility was never built.

By the 1920s, the surrounding area was increasingly developed with residences, roads, and waterfront facilities. The dredging and filling of the basin and nearby waterways helped transform the former marshland into the residential communities that make up present-day Howard Beach and its neighboring waterfront neighborhoods.

== Geography ==
Shellbank Basin lies along the western side of the Howard Beach waterfront. Old Howard Beach is situated between Shellbank Basin and Hawtree Basin, with the two waterways forming prominent physical boundaries of the neighborhood. New York City Department of City Planning identifies Shellbank Basin and Hawtree Basin as the two principal waterways that divide Old Howard Beach and Hamilton Beach from adjacent communities.

The basin connects to the larger Jamaica Bay waterway system and provides access for small recreational and commercial vessels. Waterfront properties along the basin include private docks and other boating facilities.

== Water quality ==
Because Shellbank Basin is a relatively enclosed waterway, portions of the basin have experienced problems with water circulation and oxygen levels. During periods of warm weather, temperature stratification can cause the deeper water to become depleted of oxygen, producing odors and conditions unsuitable for fish and other aquatic organisms.

In 2012, the New York City Department of Environmental Protection completed the Shellbank Basin Destratification Facility. The facility uses compressed air to circulate the water column and prevent the formation of temperature layers. The project cost approximately $3.5 million and included about 3,800 feet of perforated tubing installed along the basin floor.

== Recreation ==
Shellbank Basin is used for recreational boating and fishing. The basin's waterfront contains private docks and provides access to Jamaica Bay and, through the bay, the Atlantic Ocean. Kayaks and other small craft are also used on the basin.

== See also ==
- Howard Beach, Queens
- Old Howard Beach
- Jamaica Bay
