= Khaleel Anderson =

American politician

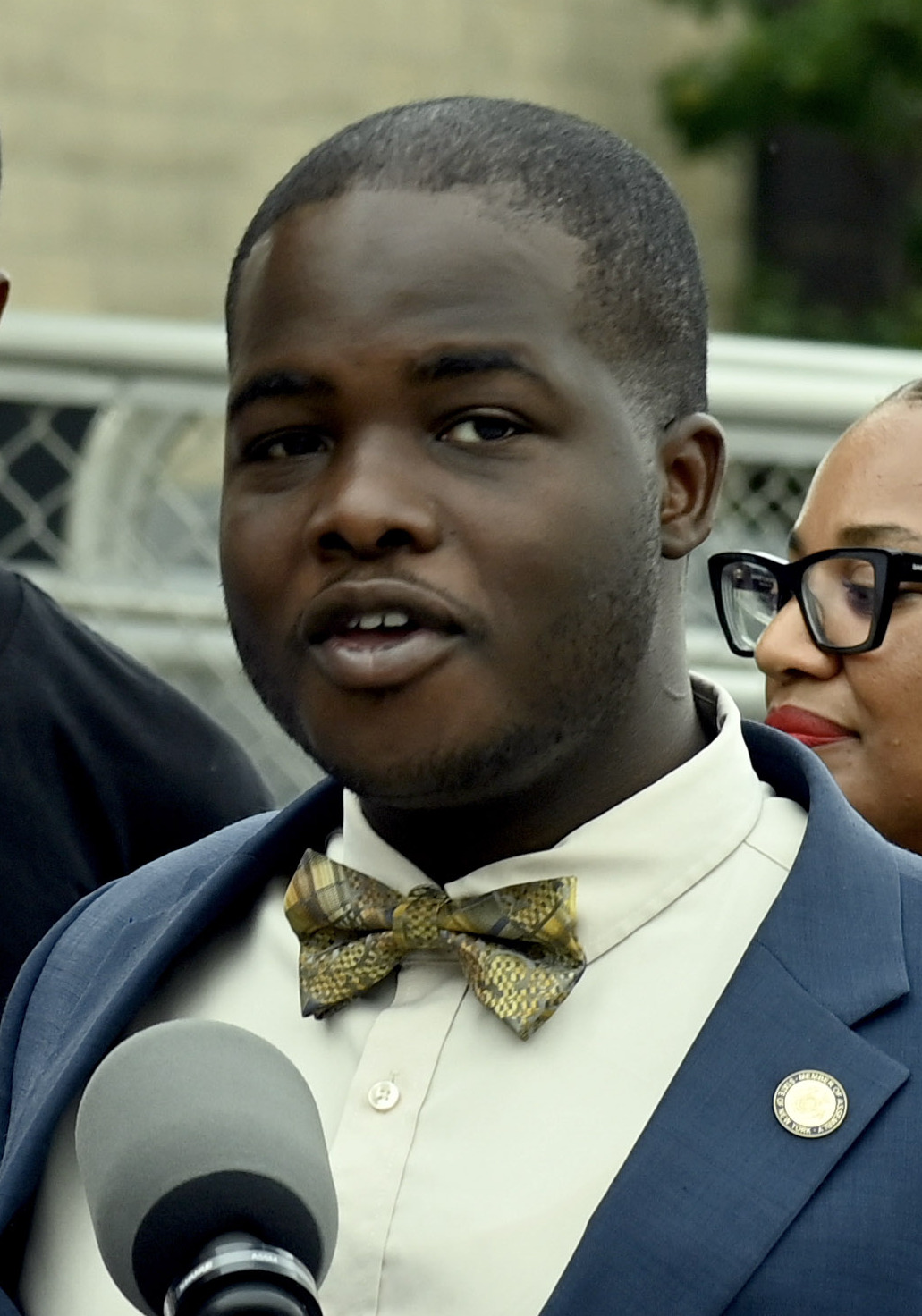
- Anderson in 2023

Member of the New York State Assembly from the 31st district
- Incumbent
- Assumed office November 12, 2020
- Preceded by: Michele Titus

Personal details
- Born: June 11, 1996 (age 30) Brooklyn, New York, U.S.
- Party: Democratic
- Education: Queens College (BA, MA)
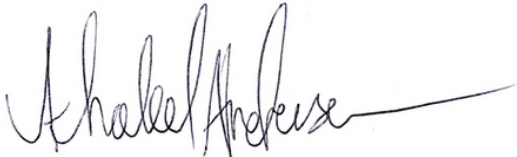
- Signature
- Website: State Assembly website Campaign website

Khaleel M. Anderson (born June 11, 1996) is an American politician from the state of New York. A Democrat, Anderson has represented the 31st district of the New York State Assembly, based in Southeast Queens, since November 2020.

== Early life ==
Anderson was born in Crown Heights, Brooklyn, before moving with his family to Far Rockaway, Queens in 2005 due to rising rent prices. Anderson graduated from Queens College in 2019 with a degree in Urban Studies.

== Career ==
Anderson ran as a Democrat for the New York State Assembly's 31st district in 2020, which was vacated by incumbent Michele Titus after she became a Civil Court judge. With the support of progressive groups and the Working Families Party, Anderson won the Democratic primary – the real contest in the heavily-Democratic seat – over Richard David, the choice of the Queens Democratic Party, and four other candidates. After easily winning the general election, Anderson became the youngest member of the Assembly in two decades, and the youngest Black member in history.

Prior to running for office, Anderson was a member of Queens Community Board 14. He also serves on the New York City Police Department 101st Precinct Community Council and the Far Rockaway chapter of the NAACP.

Anderson endorsed Brad Lander in the 2025 New York City Democratic mayoral primary, ranking Zohran Mamdani second on his slate. After the primary, he endorsed Mamdani in the 2025 New York City mayoral election.
