= Walter J. Wetzel Triangle =

Green space in Queens, New York

Coordinates: 40.663469°N 73.835467°W

Walter J. Wetzel Triangle is a small park bound by Cohancy Street, 156th Avenue, 99th Street, and 157th Avenue, in the Howard Beach neighborhood of Queens, New York City.

== Description ==
Walter 'Jo' Wetzel was born on September 16, 1944, and grew up in Howard Beach. An avid athlete, he attended the local grammar school (Our Lady of Grace) where he starred in both baseball and basketball. He also attended St. John's Preparatory School and Far Rockaway High School where he played varsity basketball.

After graduating from Far Rockaway High School, he worked briefly with the city's Parks Department. Wetzel was drafted into the Army in October 1965 and completed his training at Fort Dix, New Jersey before being deployed to Vietnam. He was the oldest of seven children, two of whom he never met. PFC Wetzel started his tour of Vietnam on May 8, 1966, and was killed in action 21 days later during the battle of LZ 10 Alpha. This .223-acre traffic triangle was named for Wetzel by Local Law 17 of 1977.

Triangular intersections that were too small to be developed were designated as public plazas, including this one. The park contains small hedges, trees, and a memorial flagpole honoring Wetzel and other local veterans.

== See also ==
- Macri Triangle
