= Keith Gottfried =

American lawyer (born 1966)

Keith E. Gottfried
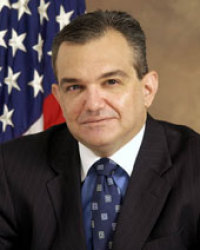
- Born: 1966 (age 59–60); Brooklyn, New York, U.S.
- Education: Wharton School of the University of Pennsylvania; Boston University School of Law; Boston University Graduate School of Management
- Occupations: CEO, Gottfried Shareholder Advisory LLC
- Years active: 1992 to Present
- Known for: Former General Counsel of the U.S. Department of Housing and Urban Development and Senior Official in the Administration of President George W. Bush; Veteran adviser to public companies and corporate boards on shareholder activism preparedness and defense

Keith Gottfried (born 1966) is an American strategic advisor to public companies and their board of directors in the areas of shareholder activism preparedness and defense. Over the course of a career that spans more than 30 years, Gottfried has advised numerous public companies and their boards of directors on shareholder activism preparedness and defense, including in connection with high-profile proxy contests, special meeting demands, consent solicitations, and withhold vote/vote no campaigns, as well as unsolicited takeover offers and negotiated and contested M&A situations. Earlier in his career, Gottfried served as a senior official in the administration of President George W. Bush and was notably nominated by President Bush on July 29, 2005, and unanimously confirmed by the U.S. Senate on October 7, 2005, to serve as the 19th General Counsel for the United States Department of Housing and Urban Development (HUD).

== Personal history ==
=== Early years ===
Gottfried was born in 1966 in Brooklyn, New York. At or around his first birthday, Gottfried's family moved from an apartment in the Sheepshead Bay, Brooklyn section of New York City to Howard Beach, Queens where they moved into a then newly built two-level ranch house in the Rockwood Park, Queens section of Howard Beach, Queens.

Gottfried is the son of Rosalie Gottfried and the late Bertram Gottfried. Gottfried's mother, a native of Brooklyn, NY, is the daughter of immigrants from Çanakkale, Turkey. Until relocating to Florida in 2021, Gottfried's mother was a long-time resident of Howard Beach, Queens. She worked as a middle-school math teacher for the New York City Board of Education for over 40 years until her retirement in 2004; her last teaching assignment prior to her retirement was the Albert Shanker School Of Visual And Performing Arts in Queens, New York. She also previously taught at the Horace Greeley Middle School JHS 10 in Long Island City, Queens. Prior to his death in 2011, Gottfried's father was a resident of Melbourne, Florida and a sales representative for various companies in the tobacco and cigar industries.

Gottfried spent much of his childhood growing up in the Howard Beach, Queens area of New York City. Until relocating to Florida in 2021, Gottfried's mother lived in the same house in Howard Beach that Gottfried's parents first moved into in 1967.

Gottfried has commented on his upbringing in Queens in regards to his views on housing and urban development; this can be seen in his public comments to the media and in his prepared statement (while a Nominee to be General Counsel of the U.S. Department of Housing and Urban Development) given to the U.S. Senate during a hearing of the United States Senate Committee on Banking, Housing, and Urban Affairs on September 15, 2005.

Gottfried attended the following New York City public schools: P.S. 207 in Howard Beach, Queens, Robert H. Goddard Junior High School 202 in Ozone Park, Queens, and John Adams High School (Queens) in Ozone Park, Queens.

Gottfried graduated from John Adams High School (Queens) in 1983. At John Adams High School, Gottfried served as the Editor-in-Chief of the high school's newspaper, The Campus.

=== Family ===
In August 2004, Gottfried became engaged to the former Cindy Goldwasser, an attorney, who was then employed as a mediator with the Peninsula Conflict Resolution Center in San Mateo, California.

On April 1, 2005, Gottfried and Mrs. Gottfried were married in a civil ceremony held in San Jose, California. Two weeks later, on April 17, 2005, they were married in a religious ceremony held at the Tierra del Sol Resort, Spa & Country Club in Aruba.

Mrs. Gottfried, a graduate of the McGeorge School of Law of the University of the Pacific in Sacramento, California, was admitted to the practice of law in the State of California on December 1, 2004. Mrs. Gottfried is also a member of the bar of the District of Columbia.

The Gottfrieds have two teenage children and reside in the Washington, DC suburb of Rockville, MD.

== Post-secondary education ==
Gottfried received his undergraduate education at the University of Pennsylvania in Philadelphia where he graduated from its Wharton School in 1987 with a Bachelor of Science degree in Economics concentrated in Accounting.

Gottfried received his J.D. degree cum laude from the Boston University School of Law in Boston where he was named an Edward F. Hennessey Distinguished Scholar of Law and a G. Joseph Tauro Scholar of Law. He also holds an M.B.A., with high honors, from the Boston University Graduate School of Management.

== Experience as a certified public accountant ==
=== Ernst & Young LLP ===
Following his graduation from the University of Pennsylvania's Wharton School, Gottfried practiced public accounting as an auditor with the Philadelphia office of the accounting firm Arthur Young & Company, and became a certified public accountant in 1989. At Arthur Young & Company, Gottfried advised clients in the hospitality, computer software, technology, manufacturing, retailing and defense sectors. He was also worked on a number of the firm's Atlantic City casino audits, including Bally's Park Place and the former Bally's Grand. In addition to working out of the Philadelphia office, Gottfried worked from the Berwyn, Pennsylvania office of Arthur Young & Company which served as the base of operations for the firm's Entrepreneurial Services Group.

== Experience as an M&A and shareholder activism defense advisor ==
=== Skadden, Arps, Slate, Meagher & Flom LLP ===
From 1994 until 2000, Gottfried was a corporate attorney in the New York City office of the law firm Skadden, Arps, Slate, Meagher & Flom LLP where he practiced in the mergers & acquisitions group.

Gottfried left Skadden, Arps, Slate, Meagher & Flom LLP in June 2000 to join the firm's client Borland Software Corporation, then known as Inprise Corporation, as Senior Vice President, General Counsel and Corporate Secretary.

=== Blank Rome LLP ===
As a law student, Gottfried worked as a summer associate, during the summers of 1990 and 1991, in the Philadelphia office of the law firm Blank Rome LLP. Following graduation from Boston University School of Law in 1992, Gottfried joined the Philadelphia office of Blank Rome LLP as a corporate associate. He left Blank Rome LLP in 1994 to join the mergers and acquisitions practice of Skadden, Arps, Slate, Meagher & Flom LLP in New York City. More than a dozen years later, following his service as a senior official in the administration of President George W. Bush, Gottfried rejoined Blank Rome LLP in March 2007 as a partner in its Washington, D.C. office where he practiced in the firm's public companies group.

=== Alston & Bird LLP ===
In April 2012, Gottfried joined the Washington, D.C. office of the law firm Alston & Bird LLP as a partner in its Corporate Transactions & Securities Group.

=== Morgan, Lewis & Bockius LLP ===
In June 2014, it was announced that Gottfried had joined the Washington, D.C. office of the law firm Morgan, Lewis & Bockius LLP as a partner in its Corporate and Business Transactions Group. During his tenure at Morgan Lewis, Gottfried led the firm's shareholder activism defense practice and concentrated his practice on advising public companies, based in the U.S. and abroad, on shareholder activism preparedness and defense.

=== Gottfried Shareholder Advisory LLC ===
In December 2021, it was announced that Gottfried had formed Gottfried Shareholder Advisory LLC, a boutique advisory firm focused on advising public companies on shareholder activism preparedness and defense.

== Recognition ==
In both 2018 and 2019, Keith was named by the National Association of Corporate Directors (NACD) to its list of Directorship 100 honorees, which recognizes the most influential people in the boardroom community, including directors, corporate governance experts, regulators, and advisors.

== Bar and court admissions ==
Gottfried was admitted to the practice of law in 1992 and is admitted to the state bars of California, New York, New Jersey and the District of Columbia. Gottfried is also admitted to practice before a number of federal courts, including the Ninth Circuit, the Northern District of California, the Southern District of California, the Eastern District of New York, the Southern District of New York, the Eastern District of Pennsylvania, and the District of New Jersey.

== Experience as a Silicon Valley executive ==
=== Borland Software Corporation ===
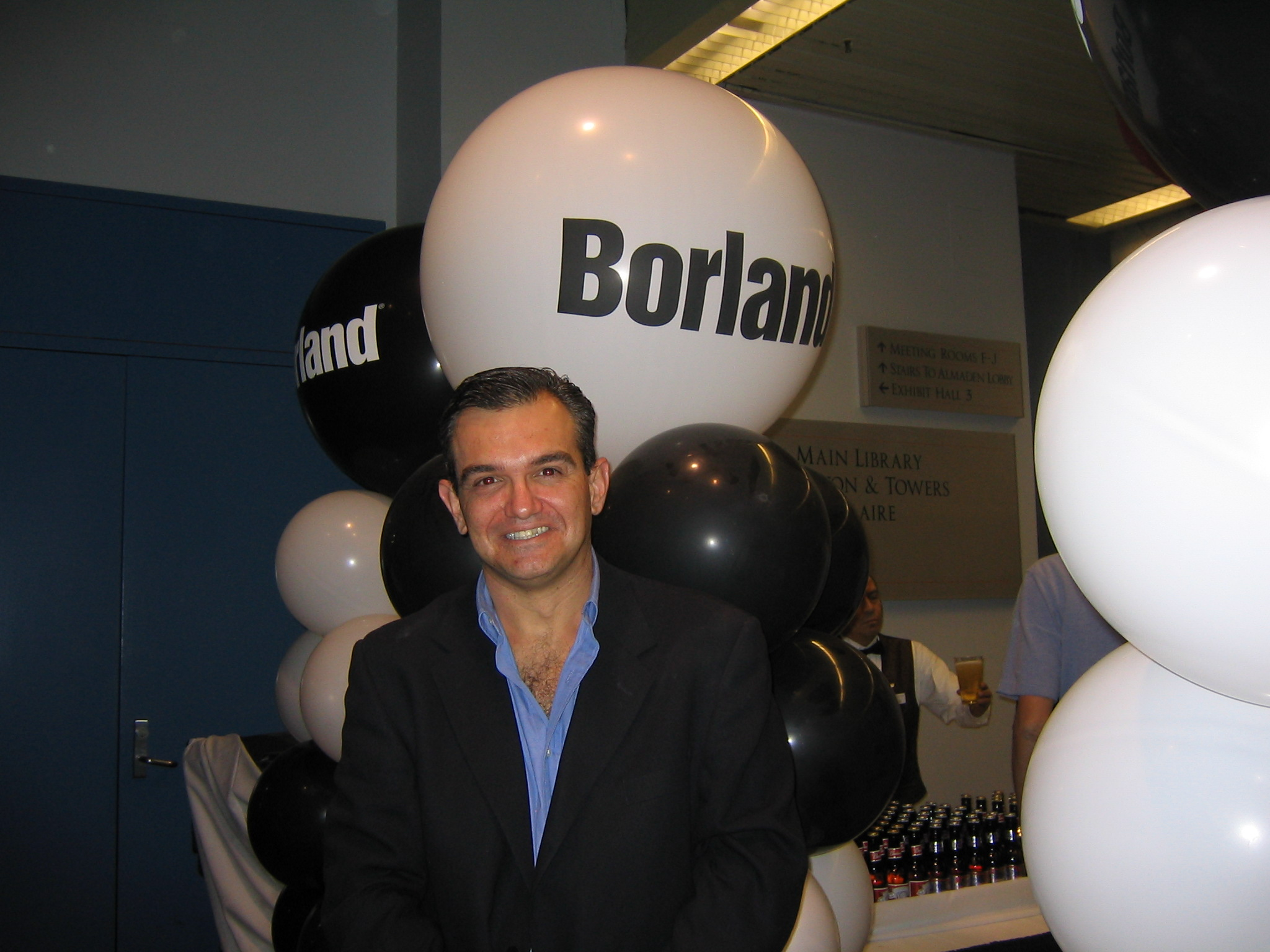
Keith Gottfried at Borland's Annual Users' Conference held in San Jose, CA in 2003

From 2000 to 2004, Gottfried served as a senior executive with Borland Software Corporation, a global provider of software development solutions located in Scotts Valley, California, formerly known as Inprise Corporation, having represented Borland (as its outside counsel) prior to joining Borland.

At Borland, Gottfried initially held the position of Senior Vice President, General Counsel, Chief Legal Officer and Corporate Secretary, which made him responsible for all aspects of the company's worldwide legal function. He was later named Borland's Senior Vice President of Corporate Affairs and Special Advisor to the CEO.

As Senior Vice President of Corporate Affairs and Special Advisor to the CEO, Gottfried was responsible for enhancing the company relationships with industry leaders, potential strategic partners, focal sales account, competitors, domestic and foreign government leaders, lobbyists and trade associations. He was also responsible for exploring new revenue generating initiatives that would leverage the company's existing assets.

==== Trade missions ====
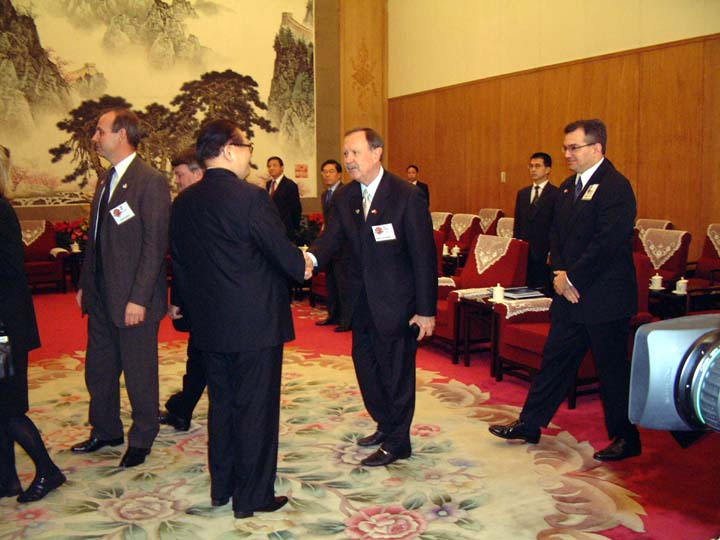
Keith Gottfried (right) about to greet General Secretary of the Chinese Communist Party Jiang Zemin in Beijing, China (April 2002)

During his time as a Borland executive, Gottfried also spearheaded Borland's exploration of new geographic markets (e.g., China, Malaysia, Thailand, India, Mexico, Morocco, Egypt, Poland, Czech Republic, Ghana and South Africa) and identifying potential customer/partner and strategic opportunities within such markets. Gottfried represented Borland on numerous trade missions across the world, including to China, Singapore, Malaysia, Thailand, Singapore, Mexico, Morocco, Egypt, Ghana and South Africa. A number of these trade missions were led by the then U.S. Secretary of Commerce, Donald L. Evans.

=== Business Software Alliance ===
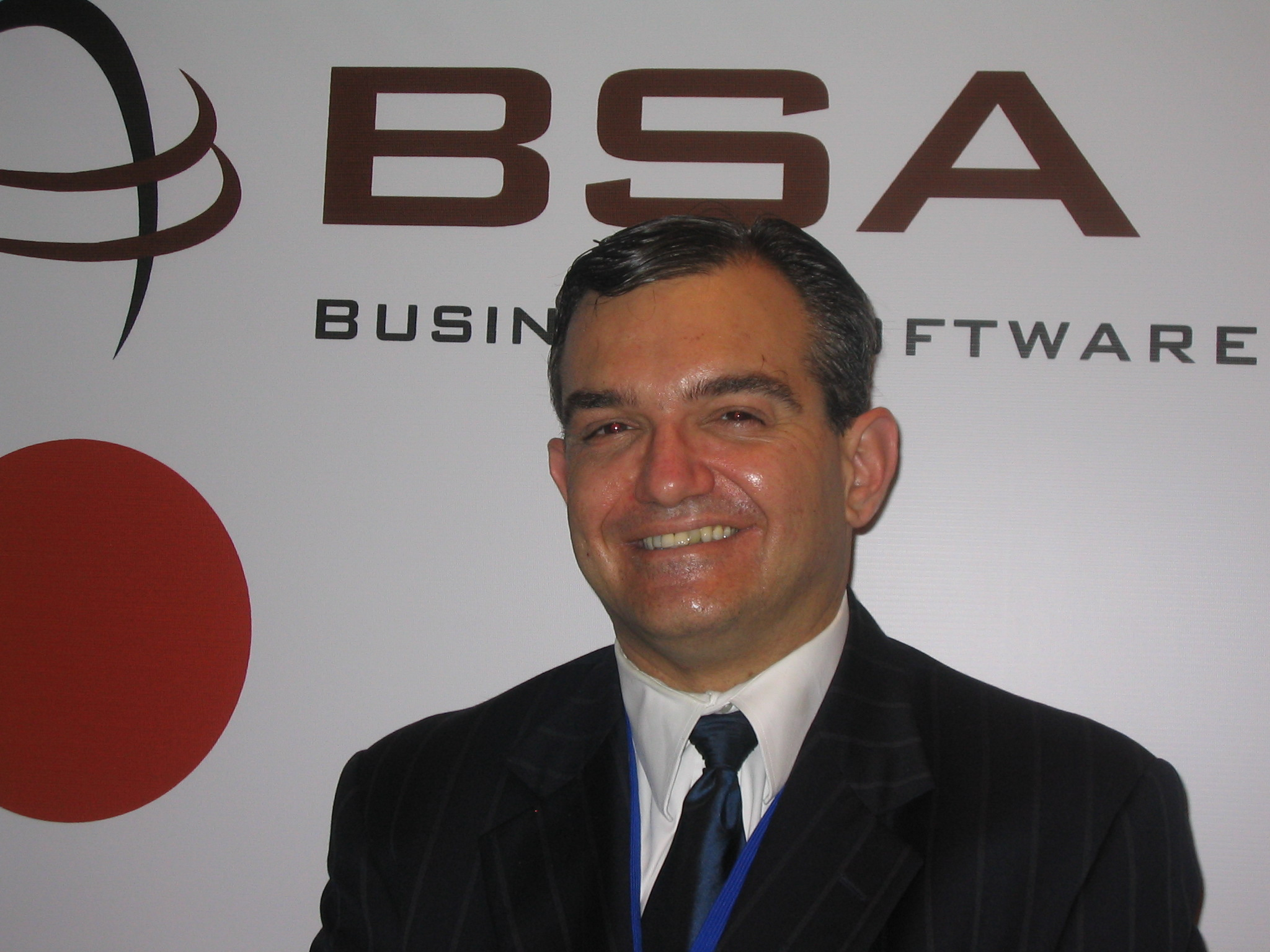
Keith Gottfried at BSA Tech Summit in India

During his tenure as an executive at Borland Software Corporation, Gottfried served as Borland's representative on the Board of Directors of the Business Software Alliance.

As a member of the Board of Directors of the Business Software Alliance, Gottfried represented the U.S. software industry in numerous meetings domestically and abroad.

Among other issues, Gottfried was a strong advocate for the passage of free trade agreements. On June 10, 2003, Gottfried testified on behalf of the Business Software Alliance before the Subcommittee on Trade, Committee on Ways and Means of the U.S. House of Representatives to advocate for the implementation of U.S. bilateral free trade agreements with Chile and Singapore.

== Political involvement ==
From 2003 to 2004, Gottfried was a significant fundraiser for the campaign to re-elect President George W. Bush to a second term. Together with numerous other Silicon Valley executives and representatives from the venture capital community, Gottfried served as a co-host for numerous events to raise funds for the President's re-election campaign (San Francisco, CA – June 2003; Fresno, CA, October 2003). In July 2003, in recognition of his efforts on behalf of the President's re-election campaign, he was among the supporters of President George W. Bush invited to visit with President Bush and the First Lady Laura Bush in Crawford, Texas.

During his time as a Silicon Valley executive, Gottfried, together with numerous other Silicon Valley executives and representatives from the venture capital community, was active in supporting other Republican candidates for national office. Gottfried was also among the California Republicans to lend early support to the campaign to elect former U.S. Treasurer Rosario Marin to the U.S. Senate representing California.

== Administration of President George W. Bush ==
=== General Counsel of the U.S. Department of Housing and Urban Development ===
On July 29, 2005, Gottfried was nominated by President George W. Bush to serve as General Counsel for the United States Department of Housing and Urban Development (HUD).

On September 15, 2005, Gottfried appeared before the United States Senate Committee on Banking, Housing, and Urban Affairs and provided testimony in connection with the committee's consideration of his nomination to be General Counsel of the HUD. On October 7, 2005, Gottfried's nomination was unanimously confirmed by the U.S. Senate.

On December 7, 2005, at a ceremony held at HUD's headquarters in Washington, D.C., the Robert C. Weaver Federal Building, Gottfried was sworn in as the 19th General Counsel of the HUD.

In addition to remarks by HUD Secretary Alphonso Jackson and HUD Deputy Secretary Roy Bernardi, the Honorable Nelson Diaz, himself a former General Counsel of the HUD in the administration of President Bill Clinton, was among the dignitaries providing remarks.

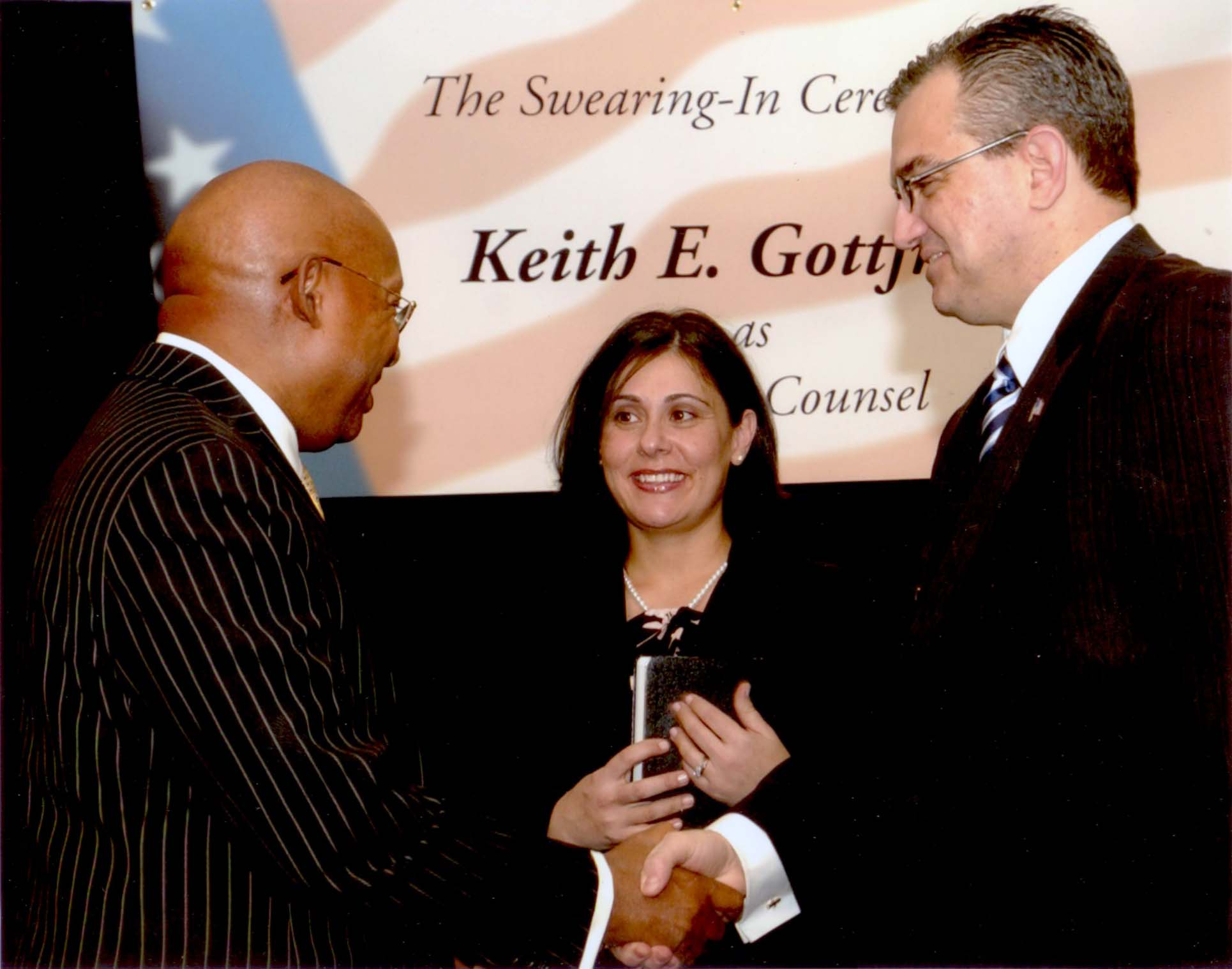
HUD Secretary Alphonso Jackson administering the Oath of Office to HUD General Counsel Keith Gottfried (pictured in middle holding a Bible is Cindy Gottfried)

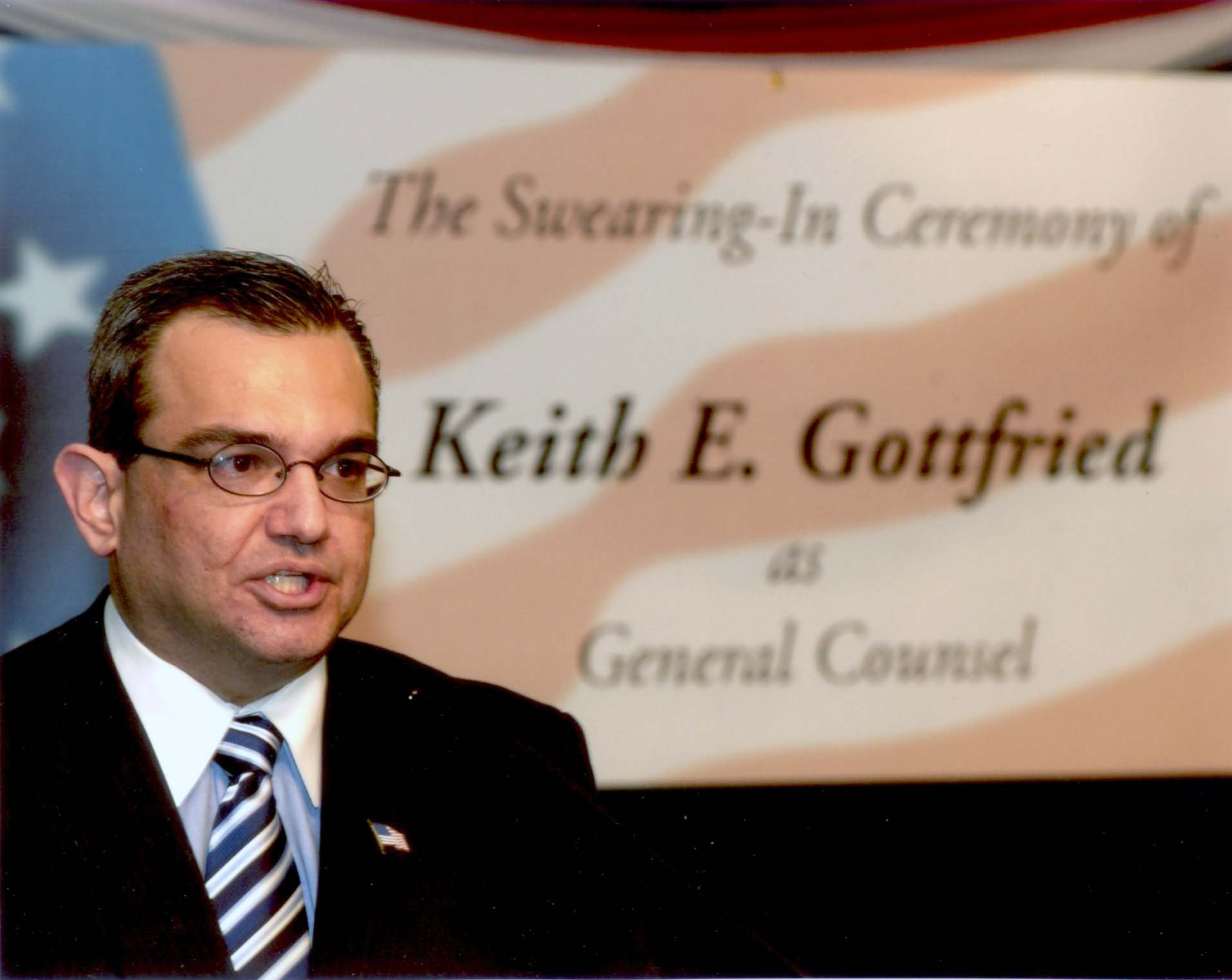
Swearing-in ceremony of Keith Gottfried as General Counsel of HUD

=== Service as HUD's General Counsel ===
As General Counsel of the HUD, Gottfried led a nationwide organization of approximately 700 employees, including close to 400 attorneys and 300 non-attorneys with headquarters in Washington, D.C., ten regional counsel offices and close to forty field counsel offices around the country. At the time, the Office of General Counsel of HUD had an annual budget of approximately $100 million.

Gottfried served as this cabinet agency's Chief Legal Officer and was the Senior Legal Advisor to the Secretary, Deputy Secretary and other agency principal staff in the department providing advice on all aspects of Federal laws, regulations and policies applicable to public and Indian housing, community development programs, mortgage insurance programs, complex mixed financing transactions for residential development and health care facilities, fair housing enforcement and urban development programs as well as federal laws, regulations and policies governing ethics, procurement, personnel management and labor relations.

As General Counsel of HUD, Gottfried was a member of the Federal Housing Administration's Mortgagee Review Board. He also served as the Chief Legal Officer for the Government National Mortgage Association (Ginnie Mae).

During his tenure as General Counsel of HUD, Gottfried was perhaps best known for his push for enhanced regulatory transparency at HUD as he pushed for HUD to adopt no-action and interpretative letter processes similar to those he had been familiar with as a securities lawyer practicing before the Securities and Exchange Commission.

During Gottfried's tenure as General Counsel, HUD announced the then largest settlement of an enforcement action in the history of the Federal Housing Administration (FHA).
