= Pauline Rhodd-Cummings =

American politician

Member of the New York State Assembly from the 31st district
- In office March 24, 1998 – January 27, 2002
- Preceded by: Gregory Meeks
- Succeeded by: Michele Titus

Personal details
- Born: Pauline Grace Monica Rhodd; August 24, 1945 Jamaica
- Died: January 27, 2002 (aged 56) Far Rockaway, Queens, New York, U.S.
- Party: Democratic

Pauline Rhodd-Cummings (August 24, 1945 – January 27, 2002) was an American politician from New York.

== Early life ==
Rhodd-Cummings was born Pauline Grace Monica Rhodd on August 24, 1945, in Jamaica, the daughter of Roy Rhodd (1917–2003). She emigrated to the United States in 1968, and settled in Queens. She married Michael Cummings, and they had one daughter.

== Career ==
She became active in community work, and entered politics as a Democrat. On March 24, 1998, she won a special election to fill the vacancy in the New York State Assembly caused by the election of Gregory Meeks to the U.S. Congress She was re-elected twice and remained in the Assembly until her death in 2002, sitting in the 192nd, 193rd and 194th New York State Legislatures.

On June 3, 2003, a street in Queens was named "Pauline Rhodd-Cummings Drive" in her honor.

== Death ==
She died on January 27, 2002, at her home in Far Rockaway, Queens, of cancer; and was buried at the Maple Grove Cemetery in Kew Gardens, Queens.

New York State Assembly
Preceded by Gregory Meeks	New York State Assembly; 31st District; 1998–2002	Succeeded by Michele Titus
