= New York's 31st State Assembly district =

Assemblymember
Khaleel Anderson; D–Far Rockaway
- Registration: 74.4% Democratic; 5.3% Republican; 17.8% No party preference
- Demographics: 6% White; 46% Black; 22% Hispanic; 16% Asian; 1% Native American; 0% Hawaiian/Pacific Islander; 5% Other
- Population (2020): 131,963
- Registered voters: 69,973

New York's 31st State Assembly district is one of the 150 districts in the New York State Assembly in the United States. It has been represented by Democrat Khaleel Anderson since 2021.

== Geography ==
=== 2020s ===
District 31 is located in Queens, comprising the neighborhoods of Far Rockaway, Arverne, Somerville, Springfield Gardens, Brookville, and parts of South Ozone Park and Rosedale. All of John F. Kennedy International Airport is within this district.

The district is entirely within New York's 5th congressional district, and overlaps the 10th and 15th districts of the New York State Senate, and the 28th, 31st and 32nd districts of the New York City Council.

=== 2010s ===
District 31 is located in Queens, comprising the neighborhoods of Far Rockaway, Arverne, Somerville, Bayswater, Springfield Gardens, Brookville, and parts of South Ozone Park. All of John F. Kennedy International Airport is within this district.

== Recent election results ==
=== 2026 ===
2026 New York State Assembly election, District 31
Party	Candidate	Votes	%
Democratic	Khaleel Anderson		
Working Families	Khaleel Anderson		
Total	Khaleel Anderson (incumbent)		
Write-in			
Total votes			100.0

=== 2024 ===
2024 New York State Assembly election, District 31
Party	Candidate	Votes	%
Democratic	Khaleel Anderson	26,045	
Working Families	Khaleel Anderson	2,082	
Total	Khaleel Anderson (incumbent)	28,127	99.4
Write-in		172	0.6
Total votes		28,299	100.0
Democratic hold			

=== 2022 ===
2022 New York State Assembly election, District 31
Party	Candidate	Votes	%
Democratic	Khaleel Anderson	14,837	
Working Families	Khaleel Anderson	743	
Total	Khaleel Anderson (incumbent)	15,580	99.4
Write-in		96	0.6
Total votes		15,676	100.0
Democratic hold			

=== 2020 ===
2020 New York State Assembly election, District 31
Primary election
Party	Candidate	Votes	%
Democratic	Khaleel Anderson	3,565	37.2
Democratic	Richard David	2,770	28.9
Democratic	Lisa George	1,819	19.0
Democratic	Shea Uzoigwe	690	7.2
Democratic	Derrick Deflorimonte	392	4.1
Democratic	Tavia Blakley	342	3.6
Write-in		17	0.1
Total votes		9,595	100.0
General election
Democratic	Khaleel Anderson	32,319	
Working Families	Khaleel Anderson	1,695	
Total	Khaleel Anderson	34,014	89.2
Republican	Joseph Cullina	4,086	10.7
Write-in		33	0.1
Total votes		38,133	100.0
hold			

=== 2018 ===
2018 New York State Assembly election, District 31
Party	Candidate	Votes	%
Democratic	Michele Titus	22,738	
Working Families	Michele Titus	563	
Total	Michele Titus (incumbent)	23,301	99.6
Write-in		82	0.4
Total votes		23,383	100.0
Democratic hold			

=== 2016 ===
2016 New York State Assembly election, District 31
Party	Candidate	Votes	%
Democratic	Michele Titus	31,019	
Working Families	Michele Titus	1,113	
Total	Michele Titus (incumbent)	32,132	99.8
Write-in		69	0.2
Total votes		32,201	100.0
Democratic hold			

=== 2014 ===
2014 New York State Assembly election, District 31
Party	Candidate	Votes	%
Democratic	Michele Titus	9,713	
Working Families	Michele Titus	374	
Total	Michele Titus (incumbent)	10,087	99.6
Write-in		45	0.4
Total votes		10,132	100.0
Democratic hold			

=== 2012 ===
2012 New York State Assembly election, District 31
Party	Candidate	Votes	%
Democratic	Michele Titus	22,247	
Working Families	Michele Titus	387	
Total	Michele Titus (incumbent)	22,634	99.9
Write-in		19	0.1
Total votes		22,653	100.0
Democratic hold			

=== 2010 ===
2010 New York State Assembly election, District 31
Party	Candidate	Votes	%
Democratic	Michele Titus	14,973	
Working Families	Michele Titus	693	
Total	Michele Titus (incumbent)	15,666	99.8
Write-in		25	0.2
Total votes		15,691	100.0
Democratic hold			

=== 2008 ===
2008 New York State Assembly election, District 31
Party	Candidate	Votes	%
Democratic	Michele Titus	25,451	
Working Families	Michele Titus	596	
Total	Michele Titus (incumbent)	26,047	100.0
Write-in		5	0.0
Total votes		26,052	100.0
Democratic hold			

=== 2006 ===
2006 New York State Assembly election, District 31
Party	Candidate	Votes	%
Democratic	Michele Titus	10,607	
Working Families	Michele Titus	465	
Total	Michele Titus (incumbent)	11,072	91.4
Independence	Michael Duvalle	1,037	8.6
Write-in		3	0.0
Total votes		12,112	100.0
Democratic hold			

=== 2004 ===
2004 New York State Assembly election, District 31
Party	Candidate	Votes	%
Democratic	Michele Titus	21,107	
Working Families	Michele Titus	605	
Total	Michele Titus (incumbent)	21,712	97.7
Independence	Michael Duvalle	511	2.3
Write-in		2	0.0
Total votes		22,225	100.0
Democratic hold			

=== 2002 general ===
2002 New York State Assembly election, District 31
Primary election
Party	Candidate	Votes	%
Democratic	Michele Titus (incumbent)	2,566	41.8
Democratic	Taj Rajkumar	1,122	18.3
Democratic	Charles Pringle	701	11.4
Democratic	Bryan Block	672	11.0
Democratic	Henrietta Fullard	601	9.8
Democratic	Michael Duvalle	469	7.6
Write-in		1	0.0
Total votes		6,132	100.0
General election
Democratic	Michele Titus	11,020	
Working Families	Michele Titus	408	
Liberal	Michele Titus	122	
Total	Michele Titus (incumbent)	11,550	85.8
Republican	Marina Rejas	1,110	8.2
Independence	Michael Duvalle	605	4.5
Conservative	Bryan Block	198	1.5
Write-in		0	0.0
Total votes		13,463	100.0
Democratic hold			

=== 2002 special ===
Incumbent Pauline Rhodd-Cummings died on January 27, 2002, triggering a special election. triggering a special election. In special elections for state legislative offices, primaries are usually not held – county committee members and district leaders for each party select nominees.

2002 New York State Assembly special election, District 31
Party	Candidate	Votes	%
Democratic	Michele Titus	994	
Working Families	Michele Titus	63	
Liberal	Michele Titus	37	
Total	Michele Titus	1,094	68.8
Independence	Michael Duvalle	276	
Conservative	Michael Duvalle	103	
Total	Michael Duvalle	379	23.9
Republican	Marina Rejas	115	7.2
Write-in		1	0.1
Total votes		1,589	100.0
Democratic hold			

=== 2000 ===
2000 New York State Assembly election, District 31
Party	Candidate	Votes	%
Democratic	Pauline Rhodd-Cummings (incumbent)	22,451	95.5
Independence	Michael Duvalle	1,049	4.5
Write-in		1	0.0
Total votes		23,501	100.0
Democratic hold			

=== Federal results in Assembly District 31 ===
Year	Office	Results
2024	President	Harris 78.0 - 21.0%
2024	Senate	Gillibrand 80.7 - 18.6%
2022	Senate	Schumer 85.6 - 14.0%
2020	President	Biden 87.1 - 12.3%
2018	Senate	Gillibrand 93.8 - 6.1%
2016	President	Clinton 90.5 - 7.8%
2016	Senate	Schumer 92.9 - 5.9%
2012	President	Obama 94.6 - 5.1%
2012	Senate	Gillibrand 95.4 - 4.2%
