= Queens Community Board 10 =

Queens Community District 10
- Community District
- Country: United States
- State: New York
- City: New York City
- Borough: Queens
- Neighborhoods: list: Howard Beach; Ozone Park; Richmond Hill; South Ozone Park; Tudor Village

Government
  - Chair: Betty Braton
  - District Manager: Karyn Petersen

Area
  - Total: 6.1 sq mi (16 km^{2})

Population (2016)
  - Total: 137,073
  - Density: 22,000/sq mi (8,700/km^{2})

Ethnicity
  - African-American: 15.1%
  - Asian: 21.0%
  - Hispanic and Latino Americans: 25.7%
  - White: 21.6%
  - Others: 16.6%
- Time zone: UTC−5 (Eastern)
  - Summer (DST): UTC−4 (EDT)
- Area code: 718, 347, 929, and 917
- Police Precinct: 106th (website)
- Website: www1.nyc.gov/site/queenscb10/index.page

The Queens Community Board 10 is a local government in the New York City borough of Queens, encompassing the neighborhoods of Howard Beach, Ozone Park, South Ozone Park, Richmond Hill, Tudor Village and Lindenwood. It is delimited by the Brooklyn border to the west, Liberty Avenue and 103rd Avenue to the north, Van Wyck Expressway to the east and Jamaica Bay and John F. Kennedy International Airport to the south.

Queens Community Board 10 is located at 115-01 Lefferts Boulevard in South Ozone Park.
