= Hawtree Creek =

Tidal creek in Queens, New York

Coordinates: 40.6532°N 73.8317°W

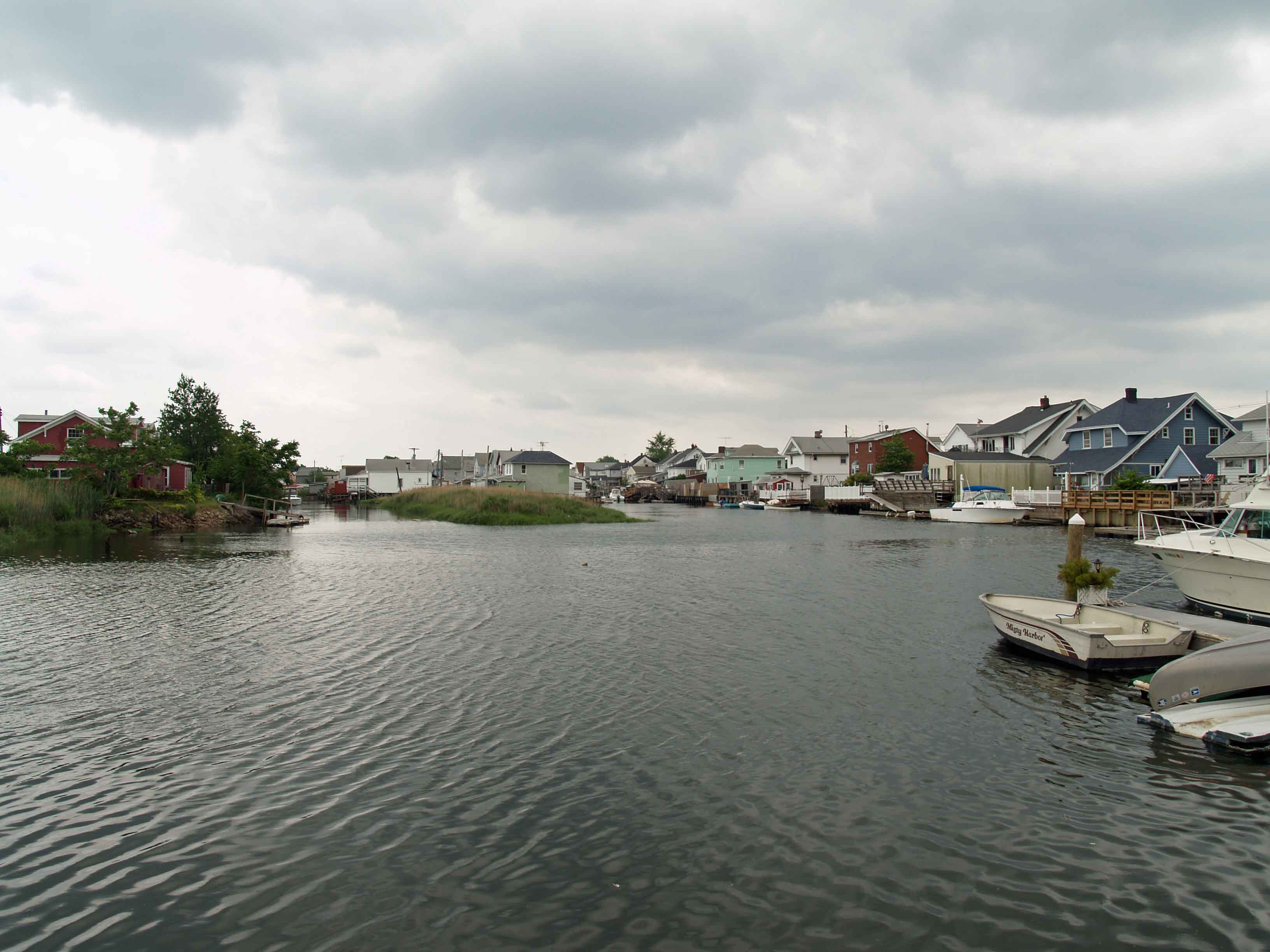
Homes on Hawtree Creek in Howard Beach

Hawtree Creek is a small saltwater creek that empties into Jamaica Bay in Queens, New York. The creek separates the neighborhoods of Hamilton Beach and Howard Beach.

In the early 1900s, a canal was dug at the southern end of the creek to create Hawtree Basin. During colonial times, fishermen would build fishing shacks along its banks.
