= John Adams High School (Queens) =

Public school in New York City

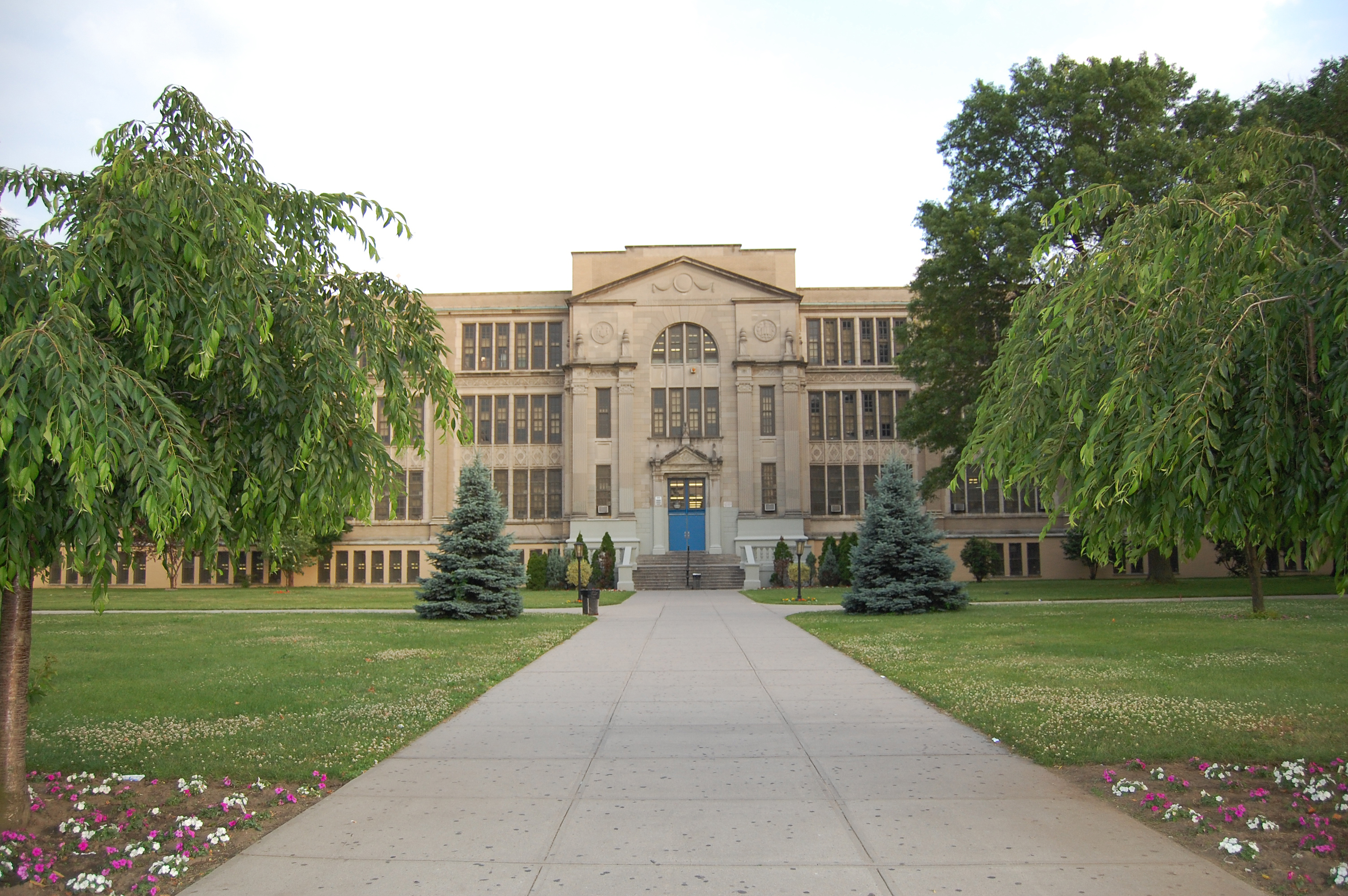

Location
- 101-01 Rockaway Blvd; Ozone Park, Queens, New York 11417; United States
- 40°40′44″N 73°50′13″W

Information
- Type: Public
- Established: 1927
- School district: New York City Department of Education
- School number: Q480
- NCES School ID: 360012302013
- Principal: Daniel Scanlon
- Teaching staff: 172.92 (on an FTE basis)
- Grades: 9-12
- Enrollment: 2,431 (2023-2024)
- Student to teacher ratio: 14.06
- Campus: City: Large
- Colors: Blue and White
- Mascot: Spartans
- Nickname: Adams
- Newspaper: The Campus
- Yearbook: The Clipper
- Website: www.johnadamsnyc.org

John Adams High School (H.S. 480; often referred to locally as John Adams) is a public high school in the Ozone Park neighborhood of Queens, New York City, New York, United States. Planning for the school began in 1927 and classes commenced in September 1930. At around the same time the city built several other high schools from the same plans, including Samuel J. Tilden High School, Far Rockaway High School, Abraham Lincoln High School, Bayside High School, and Grover Cleveland High School.

As of the 2022-23 school year, the school had an enrollment of 2,366 students and 173.5 classroom teachers (on an FTE basis), for a student–teacher ratio of 13.6:1. There were 1,764 students eligible for free lunch and 73 eligible for reduced-cost lunch.

== Facilities ==
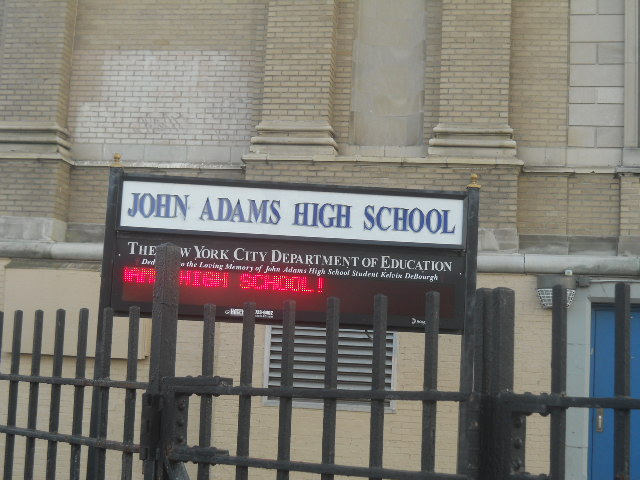
Sign at the entrance

John Adams has three floors and a basement. The basement contains the cafeteria, locker rooms, weight-training room, a swimming pool, numerous classrooms, and a Northwell-LIJ School Based Health Center that opened in 2015. The campus of John Adams is roughly six by three city blocks, with baseball, tennis, track, and football fields behind the school. The school also has three gymnasiums. There is also a library, an auditorium, a Virtual Enterprise Room which is a simulated business class, and several computer and science labs throughout all three floors.

=== Academics ===
- Grade levels: 9 to 12
- Ethnicity:
  - 4% White 28% Black 37% Hispanic 28% Asian/Pacific Islander.
- Gender %: 52.8 Male, 47.2 Female
- Attendance: 79.9%
- Graduation rate: 53.6%.
- 6-year graduation rate: 67.2% as of 2009–2010.
- College enrollment: 42.8%
- Current School Grade: John Adams recently received a [D] from the Board of Education. - 2009–2010.

=== Special programs ===
- The school offers specialized programs in vision care as well as medical and dental technology.
- Taking single sessions of math and English also frees up more time for students to enjoy electives and Advanced Placement courses.
- The school offers College Now, a program run by CUNY offering accredited college courses on site at the high school.
- The school has "collaborative team teaching" (CTT) classes, where two teachers work with a group of special- and general education students. (Laura Zingmond, October 2005)
- All incoming freshman may take classes the summer before and after the 9th grade, which means that they can start the 10th grade with as many as 19 of the 44 credits required for graduation.
- For older students who are at risk of dropping out, there is the PM program—an afternoon session designed to deliver instruction of core subjects in a single classroom environment.
- The school offers day and nighttime GED (General Equivalency Diploma) programs and vocational training. Vocational training is handled off-site.
- The school offers special education for those with learning challenges.

== Notable people ==
=== Alumni ===
- Jimmy Breslin, acclaimed columnist for the New York Herald Tribune, the Daily News, the New York Journal American, Newsday, and other venues and author of numerous books. He is also the winner of the Pulitzer Prize for Commentary.
- Eddie Buczynski, prominent Wiccan and gay activist. He attended from 1962 until dropping out in 1964, largely because of the bullying that he had faced at the school.
- Dan Burros, Jewish neo-Nazi
- Steve Cangialosi, play-by-play voice of the New Jersey Devils on MSG Plus and the New York Red Bulls on the MSG Network.
- Mortimer Caplin, Internal Revenue Service commissioner, law professor and tax attorney
- Thomas Von Essen, 30th FDNY Commissioner of New York City
- Jackie Gleason, American actor, bandleader.
- Keith Gottfried, former general counsel and chief legal officer of the U.S. Department of Housing and Urban Development and a senior official in the administration of President George W. Bush, is a 1983 graduate and the former Editor-in-Chief of the school's newspaper, The Campus.
- Jack Lord (John Joseph Patrick Ryan), American actor, director and the star of the long-running TV show Hawaii Five-O (the original version from the 1960s) .
- Richard (Dick) Parsons, business leader, former CEO of Time Warner, chairman of Citigroup, legal counsel to Vice President Nelson Rockefeller, Presidential Advisor.
- Bernadette Peters, American actress
- Joseph Pintauro, American playwright, novelist and poet
- Chester Riley, American actor, editor, and composer.
- Nick Santamaria, Mike Mincelli and Vinnie Narcardo, founding members of The Capris vocal Doo Wop group whose most famous recording was "There's a Moon Out Tonight".
- Jermaine Turner, American professional basketball player
- Jason Wingreen, American actor who was the original voice of Boba Fett in The Empire Strikes Back.
- Joseph Wiseman, American actor.

=== Former teachers ===
- Lenny Schultz, acclaimed television comedian and stand-up comic who taught physical education at John Adams High School while at the same time appearing on television shows such as the Tonight Show, Late Night With David Letterman, the Merv Griffin Show, Rowan & Martin's Laugh-In (1977), Blansky's Beauties (1977), Ball Four (TV series) (1976), The Pink Panther Laugh and a Half Hour and a Half Show (1976-1977), and Drawing Power (a children's Saturday morning TV series) (1980)
- Bob Sheppard, New York Yankees announcer (English teacher and Chairman of the Speech Dept)

== See also ==
- List of high schools in New York City
- List of school districts in New York
