= South Ozone Park =

Neighborhood in New York City

- Neighborhood of Queens
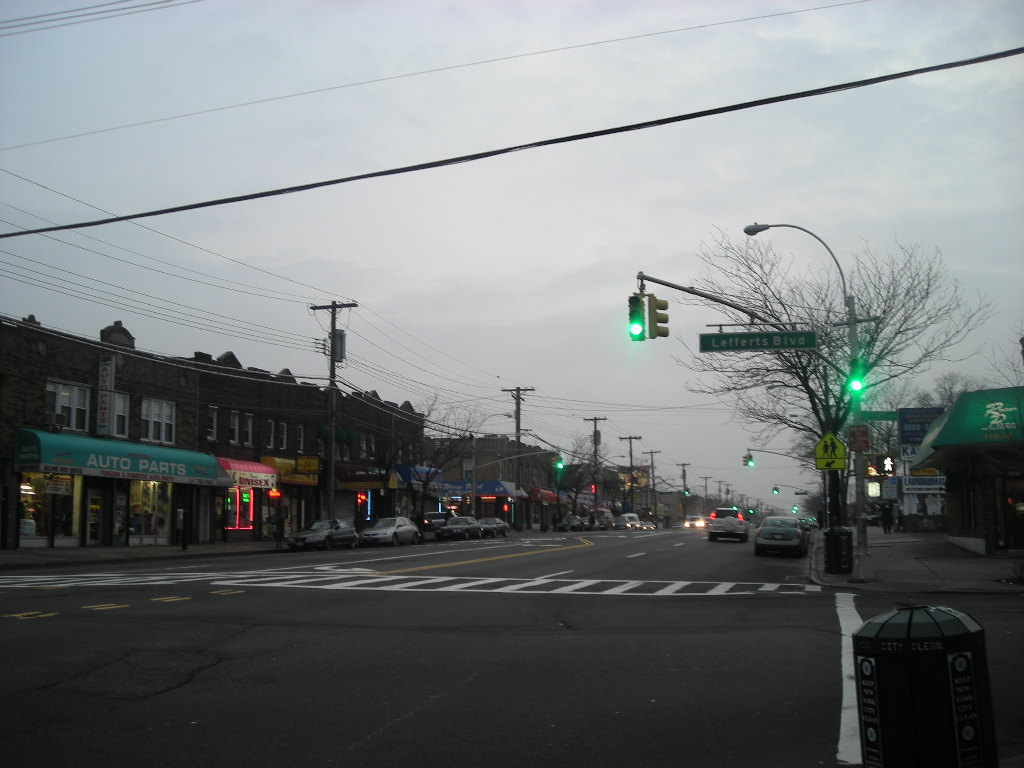
- Rockaway Boulevard
- Location within New York City
- Coordinates: 40.676°N 73.812°W
- Country: United States
- State: New York
- City: New York City
- County/Borough: Queens
- Community District: Queens 10

Population (2020)
  - Total: 79,540

Economics
  - Median income: $73,891
- Time zone: UTC−5 (EST)
  - Summer (DST): UTC−4 (EDT)
- ZIP Code: 11420
- Area codes: 718, 347, 929, and 917

South Ozone Park is a neighborhood in the southwestern section of the New York City borough of Queens. It is just north of John F. Kennedy International Airport, between Aqueduct Racetrack to the west and the Van Wyck Expressway to the east. Adjacent neighborhoods include Ozone Park to the west; Richmond Hill to the north; Jamaica, South Jamaica, and Springfield Gardens to the east; and Howard Beach and Old Howard Beach to the southwest.

Rockaway Boulevard is South Ozone Park's main business strip. There is also a high concentration of small businesses along Liberty Avenue, which is also one of South Ozone Park's main source of revenue.

South Ozone Park is located in Queens Community District 10 and its ZIP Code is 11420. It is patrolled by the New York City Police Department's 106th Precinct. Politically, South Ozone Park is represented by the New York City Council's 28th and 32nd Districts.

== Demographics ==
South Ozone Park, which is stipulated as Neighborhood Tabulation Area QN1001 by the New York City Department of City Planning, had 79,540 inhabitants based on data from the 2020 United States Census and covered an area of 1,878.12 acres (760.05 ha). This was an increase of 3,662 persons (4.83%) from the 75,878 counted in 2010. The neighborhood had a population density of 42.4 inhabitants per acre (27,100/sq mi; 10,500/km^{2}).

The racial makeup of the neighborhood was 5.1% (4,091) White (Non-Hispanic), 19.6% (15,595) Black (Non-Hispanic), 25.9% (20,619) Asian, 18.6% (14,798) from other races, and 12.2% (9,668) from two or more races. Hispanic or Latino of any race were 18.6% (14,769) of the population.

According to the 2020 United States Census, South Ozone Park has many cultural communities of over 1,000 inhabitants. This include residents who identify as Ecuadorian, Dominican, Puerto Rican, Italian, Trinidadian and Tobagonian, Guyanese, Indo-Guyanese, Indian, and African American. 56.5% of the residents in South Ozone park were foreign born.

Most inhabitants are middle-aged adults: 21.4% are between the ages of between 0–19, 28.5% between 20-39, 28.9% between 40-59, and 21.3% older than 60. 78.9% of the households had at least one family present.

As of 2017, the median household income in Community Board 10, which comprises Howard Beach, southern Ozone Park, and South Ozone Park was $73,891. In 2018, an estimated 19% of South Ozone Park and Howard Beach residents lived in poverty, compared to 19% in all of Queens and 20% in all of New York City. One in ten residents (10%) were unemployed, compared to 8% in Queens and 9% in New York City. Rent burden, or the percentage of residents who have difficulty paying their rent, is 56% in Howard Beach and South Ozone Park, higher than the boroughwide and citywide rates of 53% and 51% respectively. Based on this calculation, as of 2018, South Ozone Park and Howard Beach are considered to be high-income relative to the rest of the city and not gentrifying.

== Police and crime ==
Howard Beach, South Ozone Park, and South Richmond Hill are patrolled by the 106th Precinct of the NYPD, located at 103-53 101st Street. The 106th Precinct ranked 26th safest out of 69 patrol areas for per-capita crime in 2010. The rate of car thefts is high because of the area's proximity to the Belt Parkway, a major travel corridor. As of 2018, with a non-fatal assault rate of 32 per 100,000 people, Howard Beach and South Ozone Park's rate of violent crimes per capita is less than that of the city as a whole. The incarceration rate of 381 per 100,000 people is lower than that of the city as a whole.

The 106th Precinct has a lower crime rate than in the 1990s, with crimes across all categories having decreased by 81.3% between 1990 and 2018. The precinct reported 6 murders, 16 rapes, 183 robberies, 246 felony assaults, 133 burglaries, 502 grand larcenies, and 97 grand larcenies auto in 2018.

== Fire safety ==
South Ozone Park contains a New York City Fire Department (FDNY) fire station, Engine Co. 308/Battalion 51, at 107-12 Lefferts Boulevard.

== Health ==
As of 2018, preterm births are more common in South Ozone Park and Howard Beach than in other places citywide, though births to teenage mothers are less common. In Howard Beach and South Ozone Park, there were 97 preterm births per 1,000 live births (compared to 87 per 1,000 citywide), and 14.2 births to teenage mothers per 1,000 live births (compared to 19.3 per 1,000 citywide). South Ozone Park and Howard Beach have a low population of residents who are uninsured. In 2018, this population of uninsured residents was estimated to be 8%, lower than the citywide rate of 12%.

The concentration of fine particulate matter, the deadliest type of air pollutant, in South Ozone Park and Howard Beach is 0.0068 milligrams per cubic metre (6.8×10^{−9} oz/ft^{3}), less than the city average. Twelve percent of South Ozone Park and Howard Beach residents are smokers, which is lower than the city average of 14% of residents being smokers. In Howard Beach and South Ozone Park, 27% of residents are obese, 19% are diabetic, and 34% have high blood pressure—compared to the citywide averages of 22%, 8%, and 23% respectively. In addition, 21% of children are obese, compared to the citywide average of 20%.

Eighty-three percent of residents eat some fruits and vegetables every day, which is less than the city's average of 87%. In 2018, 77% of residents described their health as "good", "very good", or "excellent", about equal to the city's average of 78%. For every supermarket in Howard Beach and South Ozone Park, there are 8 bodegas.

The nearest major hospitals are Brookdale University Hospital and Medical Center in Brooklyn and Jamaica Hospital in Jamaica.

== Post offices and ZIP Code ==
South Ozone Park is covered by the ZIP Code 11420. The United States Post Office operates two post offices nearby: the South Richmond Hill Station at 117-04 101st Avenue, and the Ozone Park Station at 91-11 Liberty Avenue.

== Education ==
South Ozone Park and Howard Beach generally have a lower rate of college-educated residents than the rest of the city as of 2018. While 28% of residents age 25 and older have a college education or higher, 23% have less than a high school education and 49% are high school graduates or have some college education. By contrast, 39% of Queens residents and 43% of city residents have a college education or higher. The percentage of South Ozone Park and Howard Beach students excelling in math rose from 33% in 2000 to 61% in 2011, and reading achievement rose from 37% to 48% during the same time period.

South Ozone Park and Howard Beach's rate of elementary school student absenteeism is less than the rest of New York City. In Howard Beach and South Ozone Park, 18% of elementary school students missed twenty or more days per school year, lower than the citywide average of 20%. Additionally, 82% of high school students in South Ozone Park and Howard Beach graduate on time, more than the citywide average of 75%.

=== Schools ===
- P.S. 63Q Old South educates students from Pre Kindergarten to fifth grade. It is located on 90-15 Sutter Avenue.
- Our Lady's Catholic Academy Our Lady's Catholic Academy is a diverse, child-centered Catholic elementary school with 2 campuses that serves the South Ozone Park community. The first school campus located on 126th Street and Rockaway Boulevard, was founded in September 2009, under the direction and guidance of the board of directors. The school expanded to a second campus in September 2012 and is located on 128th Street and 111th Avenue
- Our Lady of Perpetual Help School is the parish school for the church of the same name. It is located on 115th Street and is within the Roman Catholic Diocese of Brooklyn. Established on September 12, 1927, it educates in grades PK-8.
- P.S. 108Q - Captain Vincent G. Fowler is an elementary school that educates an average of 1400 students from Pre K-5th Grade. It is located across from the Aqueduct Racetrack.
- Virgil I Grissom, J.H.S. 226, Rockaway Blvd and 122nd Street. This middle school is named for the late astronaut, it features Grades 6-8 and specializes in several areas of general education practices. It is a zoned school.
- P.S. 124 Osmond A Church
- P.S. 45 The Clarence E. Witherspoon School, at 126-28 150th Street, serves grades K-6.
- P.S 121 is located at 126-10 109th Avenue.

=== Library ===
The Queens Public Library operates the South Ozone Park branch at 128-16 Rockaway Boulevard.

== Transportation ==
South Ozone Park is served by the Q7, Q8, Q9, Q10, Q37, Q41, Q51, Q80, Q112 and QM18 buses. The New York City Subway stations in the neighborhood include 104th Street, 111th Street, Lefferts Boulevard, Aqueduct Racetrack, and North Conduit Avenue, all served by the A train.
