= JFK Airport station =

JFK Airport station may refer to:

== New York City Subway ==
- Howard Beach–JFK Airport station
- Sutphin Boulevard–Archer Avenue–JFK Airport station

== See also ==
- Jamaica station
- JFK Airport
