= 104th Street station (IND Fulton Street Line) =

New York City Subway station in Queens

104 Street
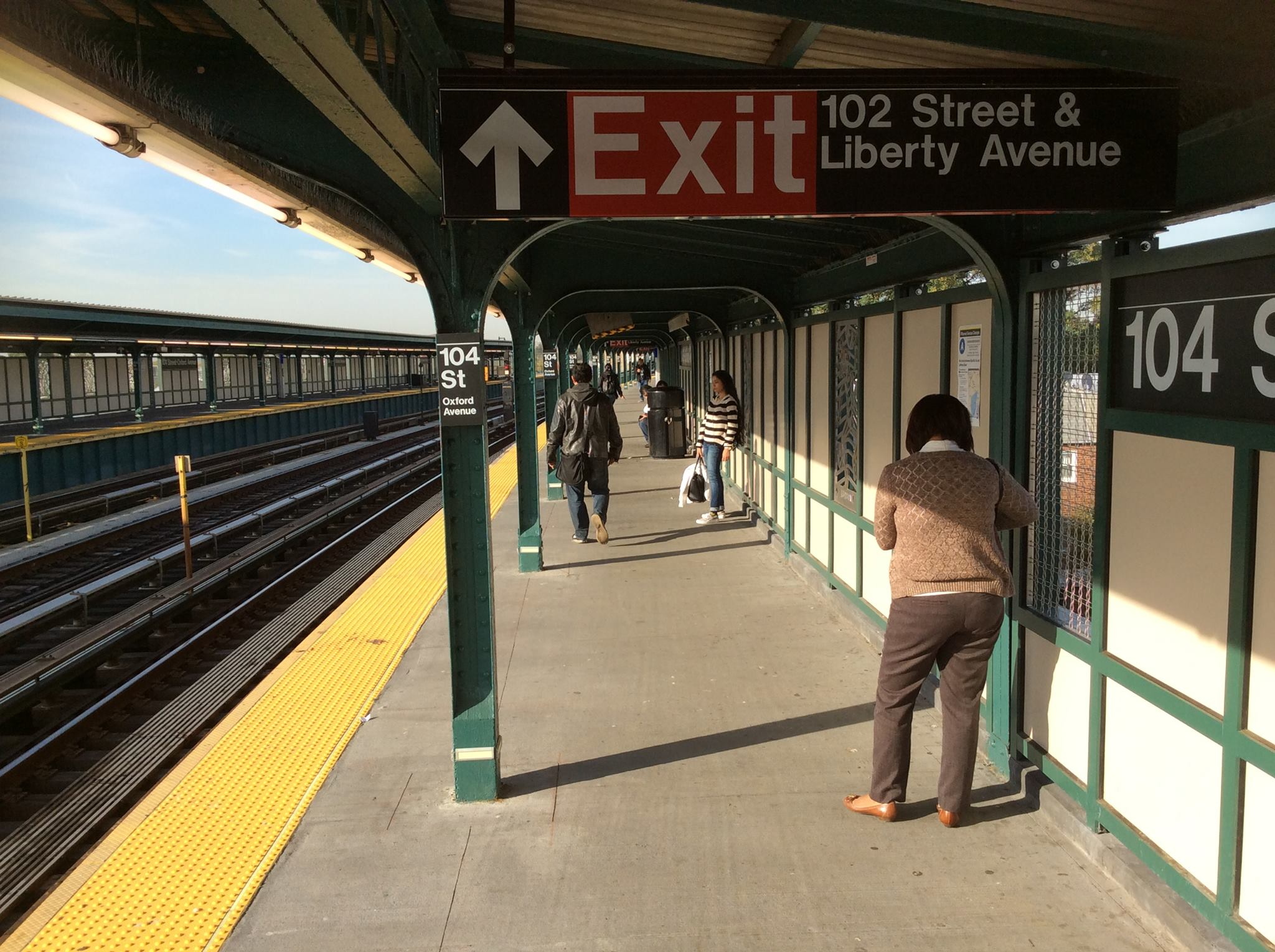
- Brooklyn-bound platform

Station statistics
- Address: 104th Street and Liberty Avenue; Queens, New York
- Borough: Queens
- Locale: South Ozone Park; South Richmond Hill
- Coordinates: 40.682233°N 73.837352°W
- Division: B (IND, formerly BMT)
- Line: IND Fulton Street Line; BMT Fulton Street Line (formerly)
- Services: A (all times)
- Transit: MTA Bus: Q112
- Structure: Elevated
- Platforms: 2 side platforms
- Tracks: 3 (2 in regular service)

Other information
- Opened: September 25, 1915 (111 years ago)
- Former/other names: Oxford Avenue; 104th Street–Oxford Avenue

Traffic
- 2025: 383,569 ▲6.2%
- Rank: 407 out of 423
Services
Preceding station	New York City Subway	Following station
Rockaway Boulevard toward Inwood–207th Street	Local	111th Street–Greenwood Avenue toward Ozone Park–Lefferts Boulevard
Location
Location within New York City Subway
Location within New York City
Location within New York
Track layout
Street map
Station service legend
Symbol	Description
Stops all times	Stops all times

The 104th Street station (signed as the 104th Street–Oxford Avenue station) is a local station on the IND Fulton Street Line of the New York City Subway, located on Liberty Avenue at 104th Street in South Ozone Park, and partially in South Richmond Hill, Queens. The station is served by the Lefferts Boulevard A train at all times.

== History ==
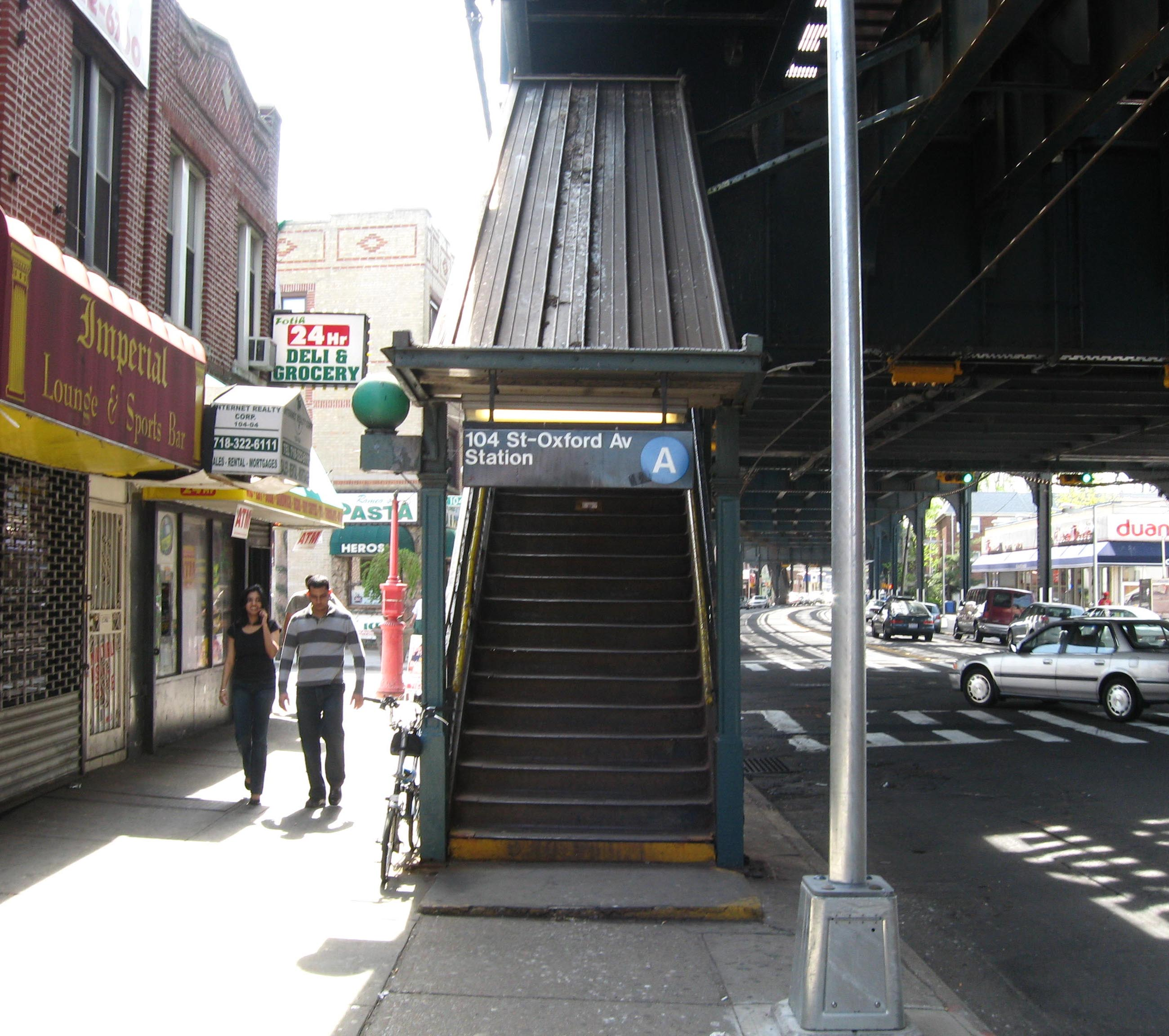
Southeastern stair

104th Street was one of the six stations along Liberty Avenue in Queens, from 80th Street through Ozone Park–Lefferts Boulevard, as well as the current three track elevated structure, built for the BMT Fulton Street Line in 1915 as part of BMT's portion of the Dual Contracts. The connection to the BMT was severed on April 26, 1956, and the IND was extended east (railroad south) from Euclid Avenue via a connecting tunnel and new intermediate station at Grant Avenue, with the new service beginning on April 29, 1956. The Fulton Street Elevated west of Hudson Street was closed, and eventually demolished.

The station has gone by a number of different names. It opened as Oxford Avenue. A 1924 system map portrayed the station as "Oxford Avenue", with "104th St." shown below the name in parentheses, and in a smaller print. By 1948, "Oxford" and "104" were shown in equal sizes, and by 1959 the name was shown as "104 St–Oxford". The current official map shows the name as just "104 St". Station signage still shows "104th Street – Oxford Avenue".

The station was completely renovated in 2014. The project, which was part of a $39 million program to renovate five stations from 80th Street to 111th Street, involved closing each platform for several months at a time.

== Station layout ==
The station has three tracks and two side platforms. The middle track is not currently used in revenue service. The A train stops here at all times except nights, running to Brooklyn and Manhattan; a shuttle train from Euclid Avenue to Ozone Park–Lefferts Boulevard serves the station during late nights. The next stop to the east (railroad south) is 111th Street, while the next stop to the west (railroad north) is Rockaway Boulevard. Northwest of the station, there is a view of the abandoned LIRR's Rockaway Beach Branch tracks from the IND Rockaway Line.

After the station was renovated in 2014 and the beginning of 2015, artwork commissioned by MTA Arts & Design and designed by Béatrice Coron was installed, titled On the Right Track.

=== Exits ===
The exit at the northeastern end of the station (railroad south) leads to either eastern corner of Liberty Avenue and 104th Street. At the opposite end of the station there is an exit to either western corner of Liberty Avenue and 102nd Street. These exits were closed due to security concerns but were reopened following the station's renovation from 2014 to 2015.
