= Aqueduct–North Conduit Avenue station =

New York City Subway station in Queens

Aqueduct–North Conduit Avenue
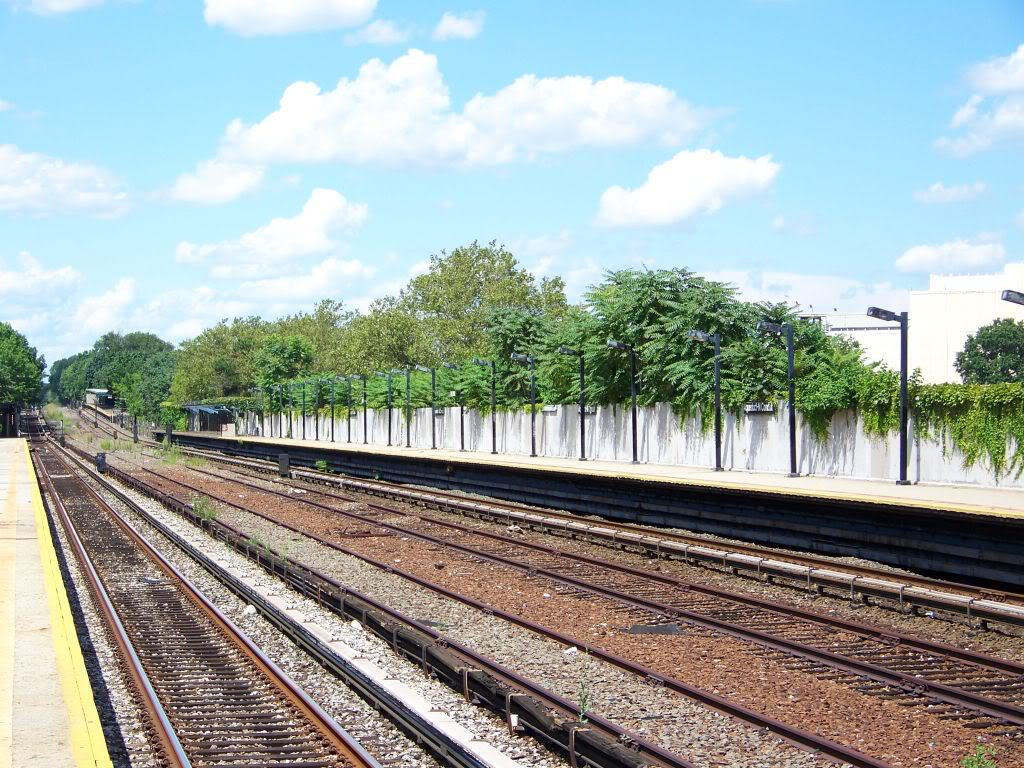
- View across tracks from southbound platform

Station statistics
- Address: North Conduit Avenue near Cohancy Street; Queens, New York
- Borough: Queens
- Locale: South Ozone Park; Ozone Park
- Coordinates: 40.668325°N 73.834034°W
- Division: B (IND, formerly LIRR Rockaway Beach Branch)
- Line: IND Rockaway Line
- Services: A (all times)
- Transit: MTA Bus: Q11
- Structure: Embankment/At-Grade
- Platforms: 2 side platforms
- Tracks: 4 (2 in passenger service)

Other information
- Opened: 1883; 143 years ago (LIRR station)
- Rebuilt: June 28, 1956; 70 years ago (as a Subway station)

Traffic
- 2025: 176,916 ▲5%
- Rank: 414 out of 423
Services
Preceding station	New York City Subway	Following station
Aqueduct Racetrack toward Inwood–207th Street	A (New York City Subway service)	Howard Beach–JFK Airport toward Far Rockaway–Mott Avenue
Rockaway Boulevard One-way operation	A (New York City Subway service)	Howard Beach–JFK Airport toward Far Rockaway–Mott Avenue
Former services
Preceding station	Long Island Rail Road	Following station
Ozone Park toward Woodside	Rockaway Beach Division	Howard Beach toward Gibson or Rockaway Park
Location
Location within New York City Subway
Location within New York City
Location within New York
Track layout
Street map
Station service legend
Symbol	Description
Stops all times	Stops all times

The Aqueduct–North Conduit Avenue station is a local station on the IND Rockaway Line of the New York City Subway. Served at all times by the A train and in the summertime on weekends during the day by the Rockaway Park Shuttle, it is located at North Conduit Avenue near the intersection of Cohancy Street in the South Ozone Park neighborhood of Queens. The southbound platform is partially in Ozone Park.

== History ==
The station was originally built by the New York, Woodhaven and Rockaway Railroad in 1883 as Aqueduct, along what became the now-former Rockaway Beach Branch of the Long Island Rail Road in 1887, and was taken out of service on November 29, 1939, as part of a grade elimination project. A temporary center-island station was built west of the station between that date and the opening of the new high-level station on September 24, 1940. This station was located 26 feet (7.9 m) south of the previous station. On October 3, 1955, the station, like most of the Rockaway Beach Branch was acquired by the New York City Transit Authority and reopened as a subway station along the IND Rockaway Line on June 28, 1956. Evidence of the station's previous incarnation is in the Long Island Rail Road-type exit steps near the south end, and the aforementioned longer platforms.

The station was planned to be renovated starting in 2016, as part of the 2010–2014 MTA Capital Program. However, the planned renovation did not occur at that time.

== Station layout ==
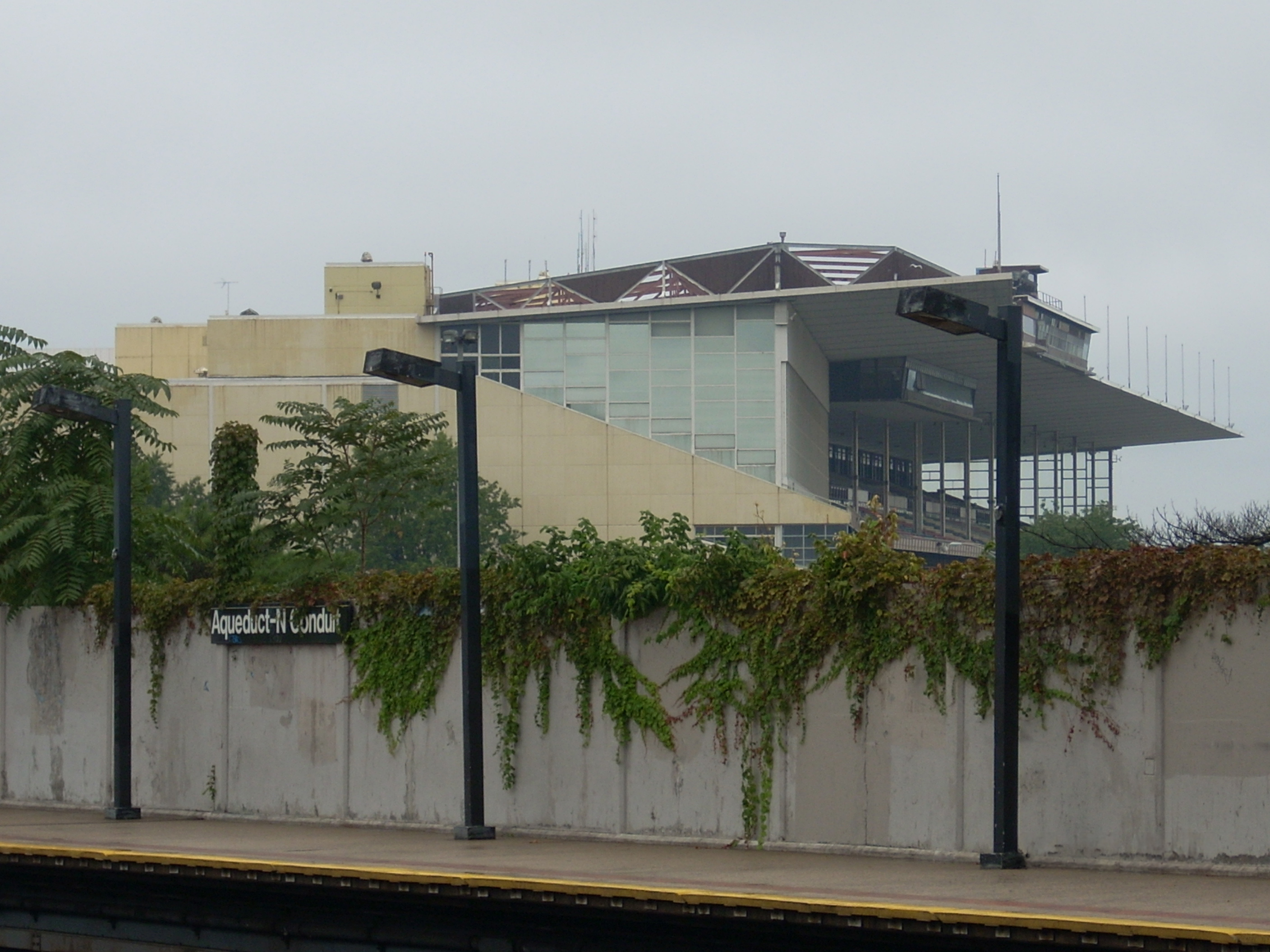
View of Aqueduct Grandstand from the North Conduit station

The station has two side platforms and four tracks, but the two center express tracks are permanently removed from service. A portion of the northbound express track, unused in regular service, reconnects with the local tracks south of this station. The subway station is served by the A train at all times and is between Howard Beach–JFK Airport to the south and Aqueduct Racetrack to the north. In the summertime on weekends during the day, Rockaway Park Shuttle trains are extended to Rockaway Boulevard from their normal northern terminus at Broad Channel, so they also serve this station.

The platforms are only canopied on the north and south ends. The remaining section has beige concrete windscreens on the Brooklyn-bound platform and black steel fence on the Rockaway-bound platform. The platforms are extra long, about 800 feet (240 m) in length – 200 feet (61 m) more than a standard IND platform length – since it was built to Long Island Railroad standards (see History). The extra length and short distance north to the Aqueduct/Resorts World special service station to the north mean that a single full length train can straddle both stations.

North of the station, the line is at-grade. As a result, the platforms are about 2 meters above street level at this section. The tracks are also less than 1 meter above street level at this section. Due to this, most roads heading toward the line are blocked off by Hawtree Street. However, there is a pedestrian tunnel that runs underneath the line. South of the station, the line is on a concrete embankment due to North Conduit Avenue changing its level of grade by ramping down into an open-cut on both sides.

=== Exits ===
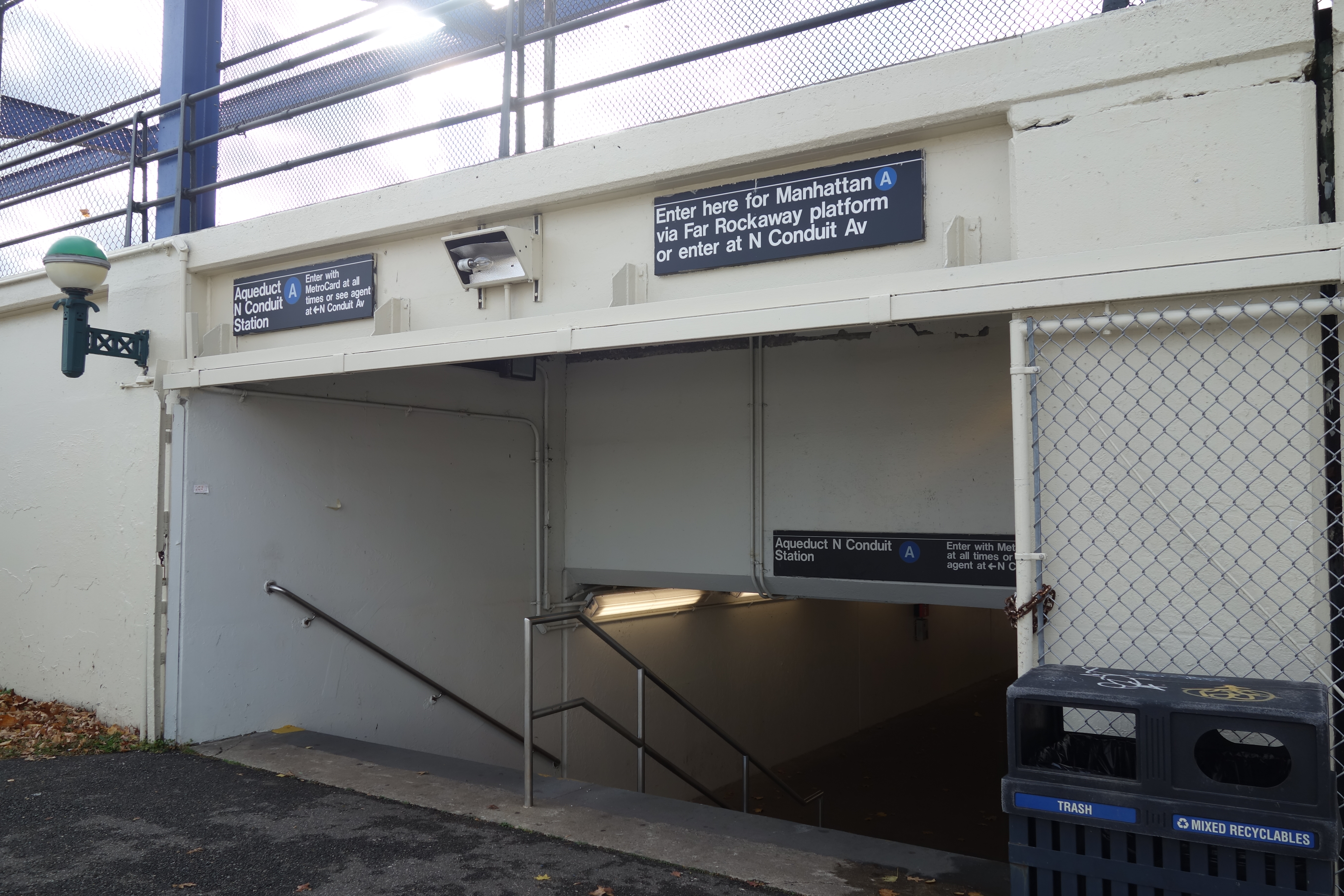
The entrance tunnel at the north end of the station, looking from Aqueduct Racetrack.

The station's only mezzanine is at sidewalk level on the north end of North Conduit Avenue underneath the tracks. It has MetroCard vending machines, three turnstiles, and one staircase to each platform on the south end.

There is an additional unstaffed fare control area at the north end of Rockaway-bound platform. Two HEET platform-level turnstiles lead to a staircase that goes down to a pedestrian tunnel that runs underneath the line. This exits to Hawtree Street (near 99th Place and Cohancy Street). There is a Resorts World Casino shuttle bus stop at the street exit, providing service to Aqueduct Racetrack and the casino. Until August 2013, this was exit-only, with a still-standing chain link fence that was locked when it was closed, with signs that had informed people that there is no subway entrance in the tunnel. The portal is now available for both entrance and exit at all times, including casino off hours. Newer signage advises that the entrance provides access to the southbound platform, and to walk the platform to the south mezzanine for northbound service toward Manhattan.

Even though the station is partially at-grade, it is not ADA-accessible because both entrances have staircases but no elevators or ramps. However, the adjacent stations to the north and south, Aqueduct Racetrack and Howard Beach–JFK Airport respectively, are both accessible.
