= Rockaway Boulevard station =

New York City Subway station in Queens

Rockaway Blvd
- A Brooklyn-bound train arrives at the renovated platform

Station statistics
- Address: Rockaway Boulevard and Liberty Avenue; Queens, New York
- Borough: Queens
- Locale: Ozone Park
- Coordinates: 40.680459°N 73.843703°W
- Division: B (IND, formerly BMT)
- Line: IND Fulton Street Line; BMT Fulton Street Line (formerly)
- Services: A (all times)
- Transit: MTA Bus: Q7, Q11, Q41, Q51, Q52/Q53 SBS, Q112, QM15
- Structure: Elevated
- Platforms: 2 side platforms
- Tracks: 3 (2 in regular service)

Other information
- Opened: September 25, 1915; 111 years ago
- Accessible: Yes
- Accessibility: Same-platform transfer available
- Former/other names: Rockaway Boulevard–96th Street

Traffic
- 2025: 1,607,584 ▲8%
- Rank: 219 out of 423
Services
Preceding station	New York City Subway	Following station
88th Street toward Inwood–207th Street	Local	104th Street toward Ozone Park–Lefferts Boulevard
88th Street toward Inwood–207th Street	Local	Aqueduct–North Conduit Avenue toward Far Rockaway–Mott Avenue
88th Street toward Inwood–207th Street	Local	Aqueduct Racetrack One-way operation
Non-revenue services and lines
Preceding station	New York City Subway	Following station
	no service	Ozone Park–Lefferts Boulevard Fulton St; express
Former services
Preceding station	New York City Subway	Following station
Jay Street–Borough Hall toward 21st Street–Queensbridge	JFK Express race days	Howard Beach–JFK Airport One-way operation
Location
Location within New York City Subway
Location within New York City
Location within New York
Track layout
Street map
Station service legend
Symbol	Description
Stops all times	Stops all times

The Rockaway Boulevard station is a local station on the IND Fulton Street Line of the New York City Subway. Located at the intersection of Rockaway Boulevard, Woodhaven and Cross Bay Boulevards, and Liberty Avenue in Ozone Park, Queens, it is served by the A train at all times and the Rockaway Park Shuttle in the summertime on weekends during the day.

== History ==
Rockaway Boulevard was one of the six stations along Liberty Avenue in Queens, from 80th Street through Ozone Park–Lefferts Boulevard, as well as the current three track elevated structure, built for the BMT Fulton Street Line in 1915 as part of BMT's portion of the Dual Contracts.

On April 8, 1928, two eastbound trains crashed in the station, killing one person and injuring 30.

The connection to the BMT was severed on April 26, 1956, and the IND was extended east (railroad south) from Euclid Avenue via a connecting tunnel and new intermediate station at Grant Avenue, with the new service beginning on April 29, 1956. Two months later, a connection to the IND Rockaway Line was provided on June 26, 1956, replacing the Long Island Rail Road's long-troubled Rockaway Beach Branch.

The station was completely renovated in 2015. The project, which was part of a $39 million program to renovate five stations from 80th Street to 111th Street, involved closing each platform for several months at a time. In 2019, as part of an initiative to increase the accessibility of the New York City Subway system, the MTA announced that it would install elevators at the Rockaway Boulevard station as part of the MTA's 2020–2024 Capital Program. In November 2022, the MTA announced that it would award a $965 million contract for the installation of 21 elevators across eight stations, including Rockaway Boulevard which will receive 2 brand new elevators (1 street-to-mezzanine-to-westbound platform outside fare control and 1 mezzanine-to-eastbound platform inside fare control). A joint venture of ASTM and Halmar International would construct the elevators under a public-private partnership. The elevators opened in June 2026.

== Station layout ==
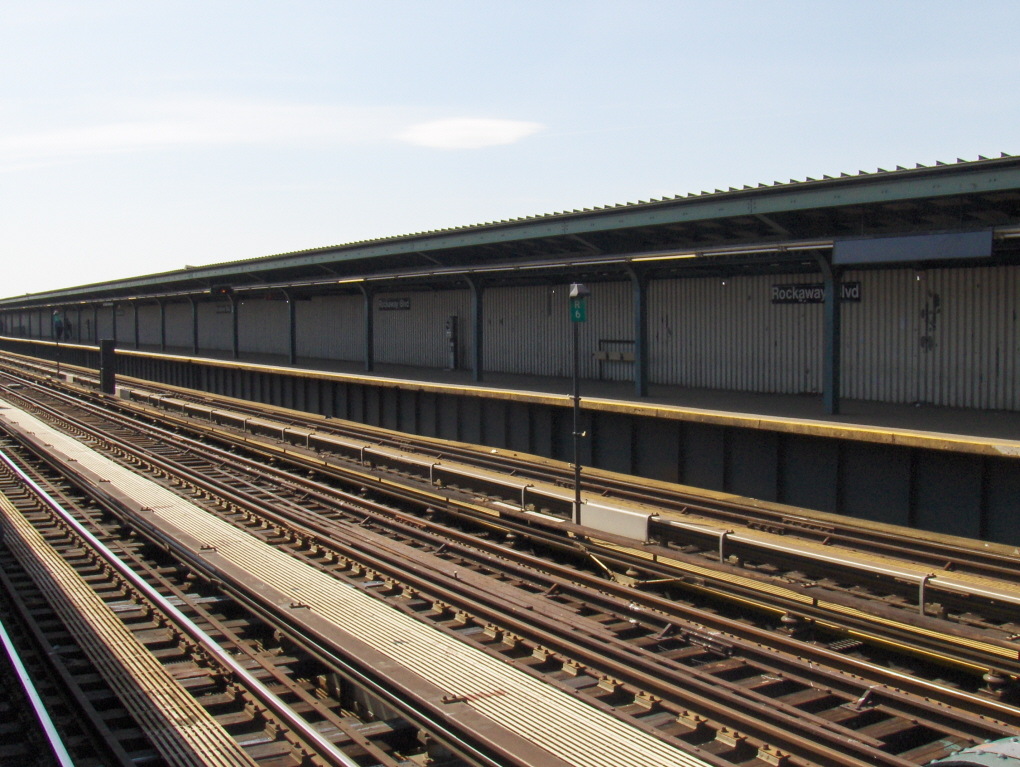
Station before renovation

This station has two side platforms and three tracks. The center track is not used in revenue service. The A train stops here at all times; a shuttle train from Euclid Avenue to Ozone Park–Lefferts Boulevard also serves the station during late nights. In the summertime on weekends during the day, the station is also the northern terminus of the Rockaway Park Shuttle train, which is extended four stations beyond its normal northern terminus at Broad Channel to here; they discharge passengers on the west (railroad north) and recruit passengers on the east (railroad south). The platforms have beige windscreens and green and brown canopies.

This is the outermost station from Manhattan that is shared by all A train branches. Just past the east end of the platforms, the line splits into two routes. Trains heading to Lefferts Boulevard continue east along Liberty Avenue, while those heading to the Rockaways diverge south to bypass Aqueduct Racetrack on an embankment before lowering to run at-grade towards Conduit Avenue, Howard Beach, Jamaica Bay, Broad Channel, and then the Rockaways. The next stop to the east (railroad south) is 104th Street for trains to Lefferts Boulevard and Aqueduct–North Conduit Avenue for trains to the Rockaways; northbound trains departing Aqueduct–North Conduit Avenue first stop at Aqueduct Racetrack before stopping at Rockaway Boulevard. The next stop to the west (railroad north) is 88th Street.

=== Exits ===
Eastern stair entrance to the station

This station has two station-houses with the full-time one at the west (railroad north) end. Single staircases from each platform go down to the elevated station-house beneath the tracks. Inside are a turnstile bank and token booth. Outside of fare control, two staircases lead to either side of Liberty Avenue at Woodhaven/Cross Bay Boulevard. An ADA-compliant elevator runs from street level to the mezzanine and the northbound platform, where a platform-level fare control area has turnstiles and an AutoGate. An additional elevator runs from the mezzanine to the southbound platform.

The other station-house at the east (railroad south) end is also elevated and beneath the tracks, but unstaffed. It contains two HEET turnstiles, a staircase to each platform, and two staircases to either side of Liberty Avenue at 96th Street. The wooden staircase landings have a high exit-only turnstile to allow passengers to exit the system without having to go through the station.
