= Resorts World New York City =

Casino in Queens, New York

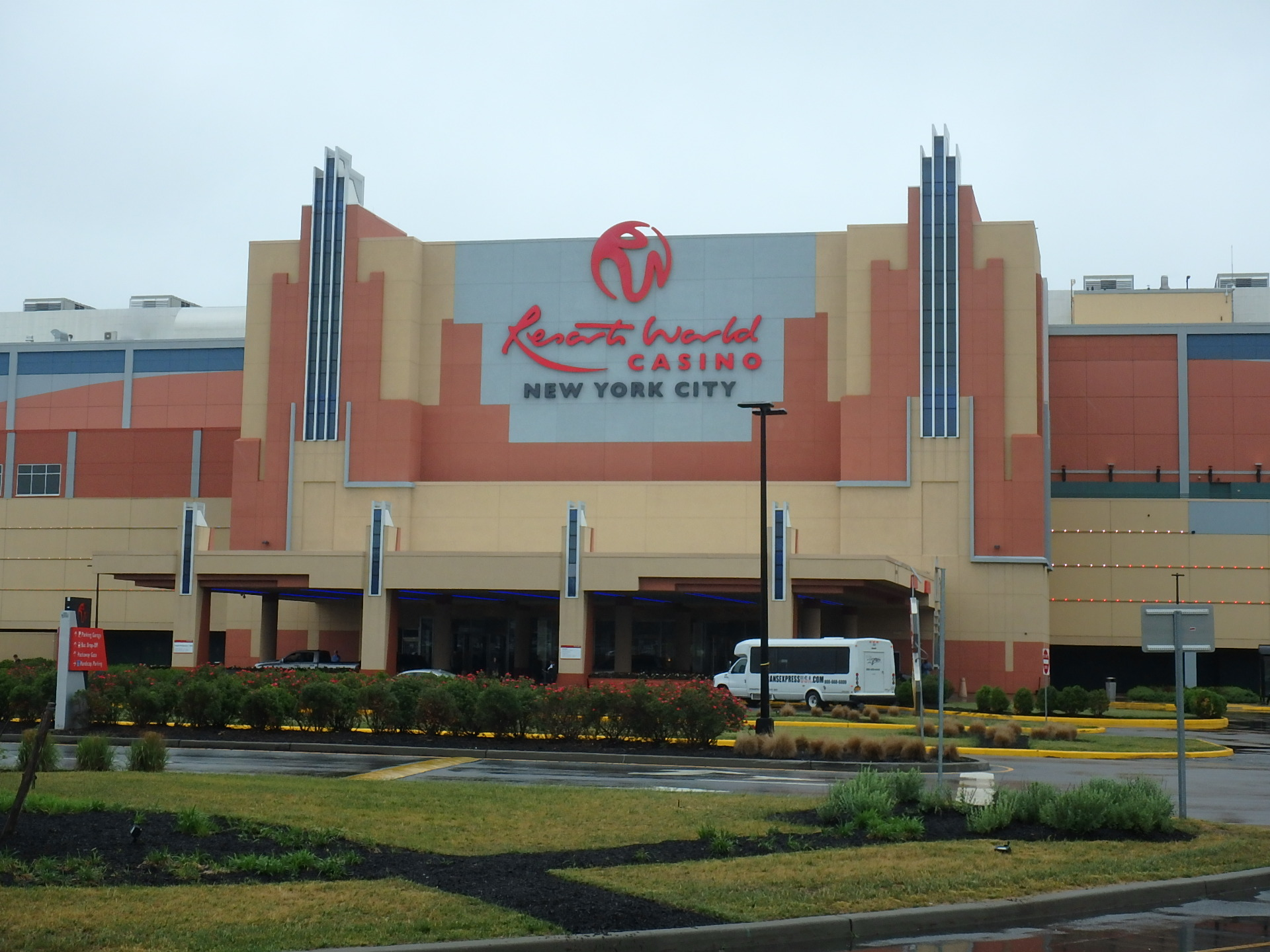
- The casino in 2015

- Location within New York City
- Interactive map of Resorts World New York City
- Location: New York City (Jamaica, Queens), NY; 110-00 Rockaway Boulevard; 40°40′23″N 73°49′58″W
- Opened: October 28, 2011
- No. of rooms: 400
- Gaming space: 330,000 sq ft (31,000 m^{2})
- Owner: Genting Malaysia Berhad
- Public transit access: at Aqueduct–North Conduit Avenue, Aqueduct Racetrack (northbound only); Q37
- Website: www.RWNewYork.com

Resorts World New York City is a casino hotel in the Jamaica neighborhood of Queens in New York City. The facility was opened in 2011 on 72.6 acres leased from the New York State Franchise Oversight Board. It is part of a 172-acre lot that was also home to the defunct Aqueduct Racetrack and the New York Racing Association headquarters.

Resorts World New York City includes a large casino and a 400-room Hyatt Regency hotel. The casino features four automated table games—baccarat, blackjack, craps, and roulette—and a wide array of video slot machines. Baccarat is played with real playing cards, dealt inside a machine.

== History ==
The casino was proposed in the late 2000s and opened on October 28, 2011, the first Resorts World to be built in America. It is the first and only legal casino in New York City, and one of three in the region, with Empire City Casino and Jake's 58 Hotel & Casino in Islandia. The casino is connected to the Aqueduct Racetrack station of the New York City Subway via a skybridge, which opened in 2013.

The New York State Legislature legalized video gambling devices at racetracks in 2001. However, the opening of a racino at the track hit various problems. Video lottery terminals similar to slot machines were approved at five locations, including Aqueduct, Finger Lakes Race Track, Monticello Raceway, Vernon Downs, and Yonkers Raceway. The revenue would be divided between the racetracks and the State and would allow tracks to increase purses and to attract better-quality horses in races.

In 2007, the State issued a request for proposals to operate the video lottery terminals at Aqueduct. Among the bids received was a $2 billion proposal by the Shinnecock Indian Nation to open a casino at the track. The proposal was in conjunction with Marian Ilitch, a co-owner of the Detroit Red Wings. The proposal according to most sources was dead on arrival since, even if the Shinnecocks received official Bureau of Indian Affairs recognition as a tribe, the Aqueduct Casino would still have to be approved by the New York State Legislature and the Bureau of Indian Affairs; and Aqueduct would have to first be taken into trust by the Department of Interior, as the Shinnecocks historically had not owned property in Queens.

In October 2008, the State selected the Delaware North as the winning bidder among three proposals to build a racino at Aqueduct. The 330,000-square-foot (31,000 m^{2}) facility would include 4,500 slot machines. These plans fell apart in March 2009 when the developer was unable to make a $370 million upfront payment to the State.

In July 2009, seven companies submitted bids to develop a racino at Aqueduct: Aqueduct Entertainment Group, Delaware North, MGM Mirage, Mohegan Sun, Penn National Gaming, SL Green Realty, and Wynn Resorts. Some developers indicated that a portion of the slot machines could open as early as April 2010. The selection of an operator for the casino was delayed for several months because State officials frequently changed the rules and could not reach an agreement on the winning bidder, prompting Wynn to pull out of the running in November. On January 29, 2010, Governor David Paterson announced that the Aqueduct Entertainment Group would run the casino.

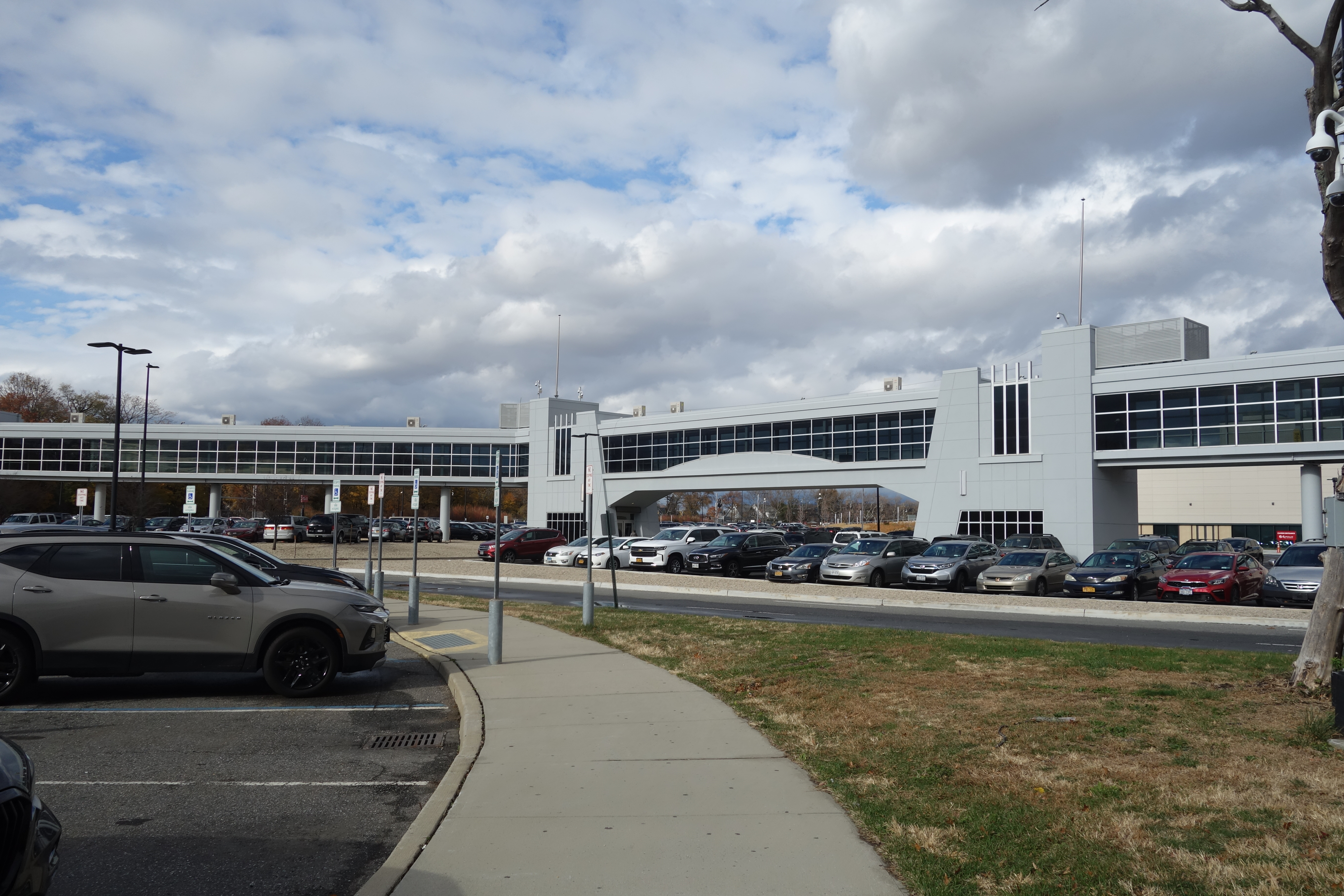
The skybridge connecting the casino to the New York City Subway's Aqueduct Racetrack station

Aqueduct Entertainment Group partners included GreenStar Services Corporation, Turner Construction Company, Levine Builders, The Darman Group, Empowerment Development Corporation, Navegante Group, PS&S Design, Siemens AG, and Clairvest Group. The appointment generated controversy because of charges that AEG, which had the worst initial bid of those bidding, was allowed to change its bid so that it had the best. Paterson was reported to have demanded that the ownership of an affirmative action component.

During this time rapper Jay-Z, through his company Gain Global Investments Network LLC, then got a 7% ownership of AEG. Charges were made that Jay-Z and Paterson had a personal relationship. U.S. prosecutors investigated the bidding process, particularly in light of the fact that AEG won the bid two days after Queens megachurch pastor Floyd Flake (who is also an AEG investor) threatened to switch his support in the 2010 governor race from Paterson to Andrew Cuomo. New York house speaker Sheldon Silver also threatened not to sign off on the deal. Paterson maintained there was no quid pro quo.

On March 9, 2010, Paterson, Flake, and Jay-Z withdrew from further involvement. Paterson said he was recusing himself on the advice of his lawyers. Flake, who had 0.6% share, said the case was distracting from his other projects. On March 11, 2010, the State withdrew its support for the AEG bid and announced that a new group would be selected through an "expedited, transparent, apolitical, and publicly accountable process." Aqueduct Entertainment Group said it intended to sue.

In June 2010, New York Lottery officials announced that six groups were considering submitting bids to develop the racino. These include three of the previous bidders (Delaware North, Penn National Gaming, and SL Green Realty) and three new groups (Empire City Casino at Yonkers Raceway, Genting New York LLC, and Clairvest Group). On June 29, three of the firms submitted bids: SL Green/Hard Rock Cafe, Genting Group, and Penn National. Clairvest participated in the SL Green/Hard Rock Cafe bid.

The bids from Penn and SL Green were disqualified in July for not meeting requirements. In August 2010, Lottery officials accepted Genting Group's $380 million upfront licensing fee bid, which was $55 million more than the closest competing bid. Its business model includes targeting flyers stranded at John F. Kennedy Airport. The company said its plans involve 1,200 construction jobs and 800 permanent jobs, and that it will bring the state $500 million a year in revenue. Genting opened the Resorts World Casino New York City on October 28, 2011, with 2,280 gaming terminals.

=== Opening of Hyatt Regency ===
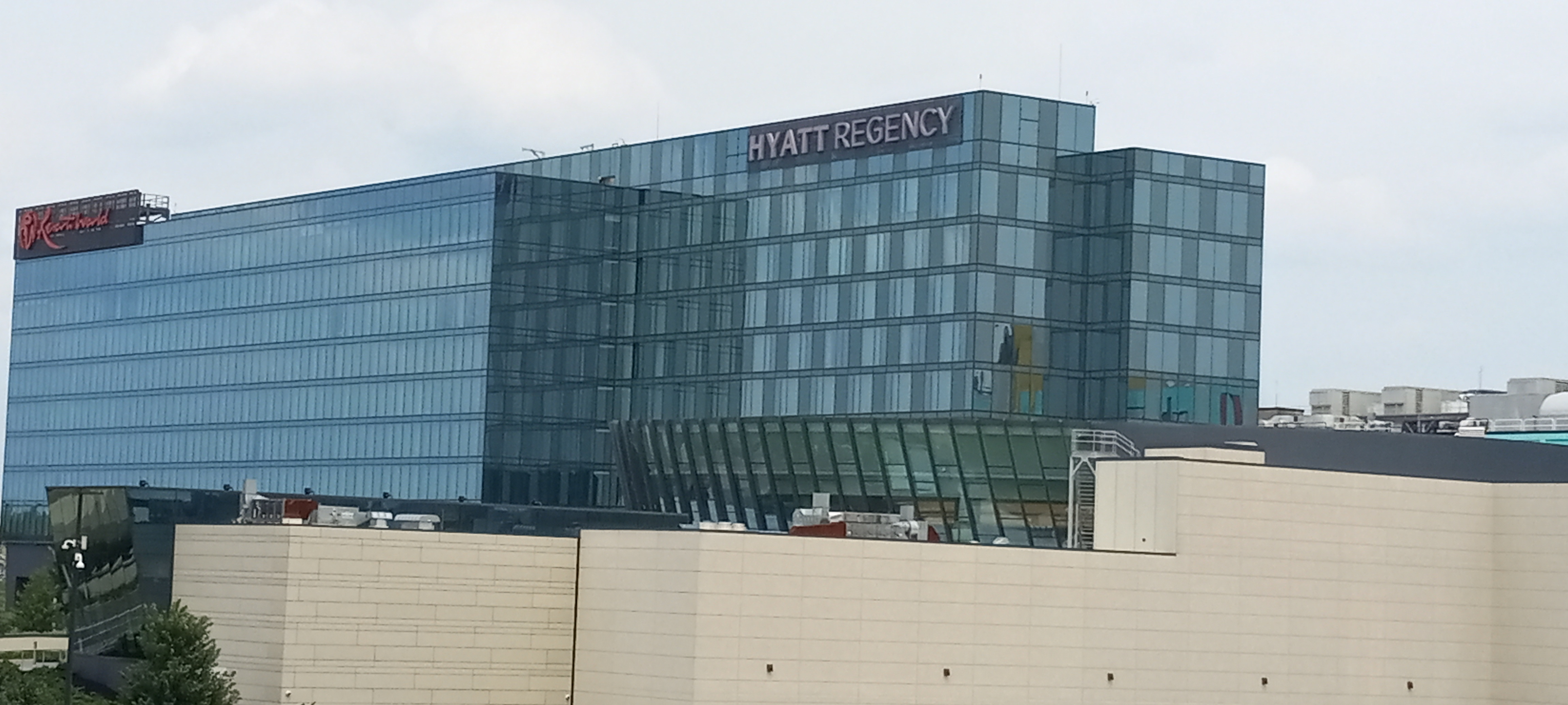
The Hyatt Regency at Resorts World

In August 2021, a 400-room Hyatt Regency hotel opened on the site of the casino. It is owned by Genting Group, which also owns Resorts World. The opening of the hotel made Resorts World New York City a casino hotel.

=== Expansion ===
In February 2024, amid efforts to award three downstate New York casino licenses, Genting announced plans to expand the property into an integrated resort if it were awarded a full casino license. Additional hotel space, a performance venue, convention space along with shopping and dining options will be added. Under the proposal, the casino would expand to 350,000 square feet, making it one of the largest casinos in the US. An additional 1,600 hotel rooms will be added, giving the resort a total of 2,000 rooms.

This will make Resorts World New York City the largest hotel in New York City. An expanded Resorts World will also include 350,000 square feet of convention and meeting space as well as a 7,000-seat arena for entertainment events such as concerts. With the closure of the racetrack an “Aqueduct Park” will be built which would include a sports academy. This expansion will also created 3,000 new units of housing as well as other infrastructure improvements. The expansion will cost $5 billion.

Resorts World submitted their bid for a commercial casino license in June 2025. If the bid were approved, Resorts World planned to start construction as soon as mid-2026. Genting presented their proposal for Resorts World New York City to the Community Advisory Committee in July 2025. On September 25, 2025, the Community Advisory Committee voted unanimously in favor of advancing Resorts World's bid for consideration for a full casino license.

On December 1, 2025, the state's Gaming Facility Location Board recommended that a casino license be awarded to Resorts World New York City, an action which needed to be ratified by the New York State Gaming Commission by the end of the year before formal approval could be issued for the expansion to proceed. Final approval of the casino license was given by the Gaming Commission on December 15, 2025.

Resorts World's expanded gaming operations began on April 28, 2026 when live table games became available. The adjacent Aqueduct Racetrack closed its doors in June 2026 after being in operation for 132 years. Construction of the expansion projects on the old site of the Aqueduct Racetrack began in July 2026.

== See also ==
- Resorts World Catskills
- Resorts World Hudson Valley
- LEGOLAND New York
