= Aqueduct Racetrack station =

New York City Subway station in Queens

Aqueduct Racetrack
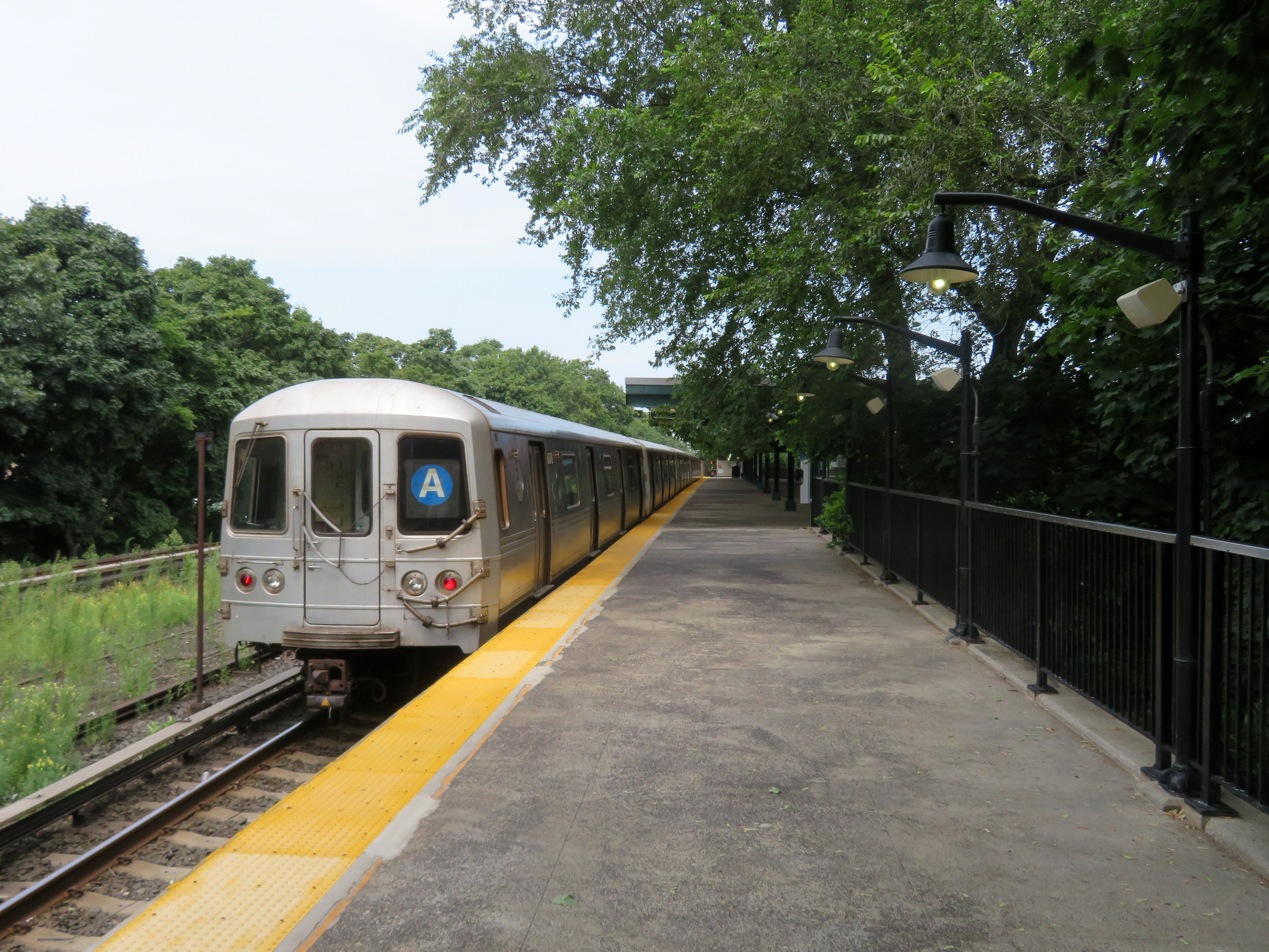
- Manhattan-bound A train at the station in August 2019

Station statistics
- Address: near 98-00 Pitkin Avenue; Queens, New York
- Borough: Queens
- Locale: South Ozone Park
- Coordinates: 40.672086°N 73.835914°W
- Division: B (IND, formerly LIRR Rockaway Beach Branch)
- Line: IND Rockaway Line
- Services: A (Northbound only)
- Transit: MTA Bus: Q7, Q11, Q37
- Structure: Embankment
- Platforms: 1 side platform
- Tracks: 4 (2 in passenger service)

Other information
- Opened: September 14, 1959; 67 years ago October 22, 1997; 29 years ago August 13, 2013; 13 years ago
- Closed: 1990; 36 years ago April 28, 2011; 15 years ago
- Accessible: Yes

Traffic
- 2025: 168,011 ▼1.7%
- Rank: 415 out of 423
- Notes: Southbound trains do not stop at this station
Services
Preceding station	New York City Subway	Following station
Rockaway Boulevard toward Inwood–207th Street	A (New York City Subway service)	Aqueduct–North Conduit Avenue One-way operation
Former services
Preceding station	New York City Subway	Following station
Jay Street–Borough Hall toward 21st Street–Queensbridge	JFK Express	Howard Beach–JFK Airport One-way operation
Location
Location within New York City Subway
Location within New York City
Location within New York
Track layout
Street map
Station service legend
Symbol	Description
Stops all times	Stops all times

The Aqueduct Racetrack station is a local station on the IND Rockaway Line of the New York City Subway. Located on the west side of Aqueduct Racetrack near Pitkin Avenue in the South Ozone Park neighborhood of Queens, it is served by northbound A trains at all times and by the northbound Rockaway Park Shuttle in the summertime on weekends during the day. The station contains four tracks, of which the outer two are in passenger service; the two center express tracks have been disconnected from the line and permanently removed. There is a single side platform next to the northbound local track.

The station was built in 1959 to serve the racetrack and on racing days the station would be open with "Aqueduct Special" trains running nonstop from 42nd Street. The specials were replaced by JFK Express service, before service at the station was altogether discontinued in 1990. The station reopened in 1997 and was typically open only on racing days, although some trains stopped at the station regardless of the time of day. From 2011 to 2013, it was closed and rebuilt to provide better access to the Resorts World Casino, and an elevator was installed to make the station compliant with the Americans with Disabilities Act of 1990. Since then, the Aqueduct Racetrack station has operated 24 hours a day.

Aqueduct Racetrack is one of the least-used stations in the system. It was ranked 415th out of 424 by ridership as of 2023, with 202,474 passengers.

== History ==
=== Context and development ===
The Rockaway Line was opened on August 26, 1880, by the New York, Woodhaven and Rockaway Railroad and would later be operated by the Long Island Rail Road (LIRR) as its Rockaway Beach Branch. Frequent fires on the line's wooden viaduct across Jamaica Bay between The Raunt and Broad Channel made the line a liability for the LIRR. After a fire on May 8, 1950, cut service, the bankrupt LIRR sought to sell or abandon the line altogether. The city purchased the southern portion of the line in 1952. The rebuilt IND Rockaway Line opened for subway service on June 26, 1956.

In 1955, the New York Racing Association (NYRA) chose to upgrade Aqueduct Racetrack in South Ozone Park in part because of its proximity to the Rockaway Beach Branch. As part of the modernization of the racetrack, the Racing Association built a station with ramps leading directly to the track and facilities that could handle racetrack crowds. Once the work was finished, it was handed over to the city. The new station was for northbound trains to Brooklyn and Manhattan, and it was built north of the existing Aqueduct station. In order to allow for the switching manoeuvres required for southbound trains to stop at the station, major signal changes were made on the line. The single-platform station was built by Aqueduct Racetrack owners at the cost of $1 million. The NYRA agreed to reimburse the New York City Transit Authority (NYCTA) for annual expenses. The Aqueduct Racetrack station opened on September 14, 1959, on the same date as the renovated Aqueduct Racetrack.

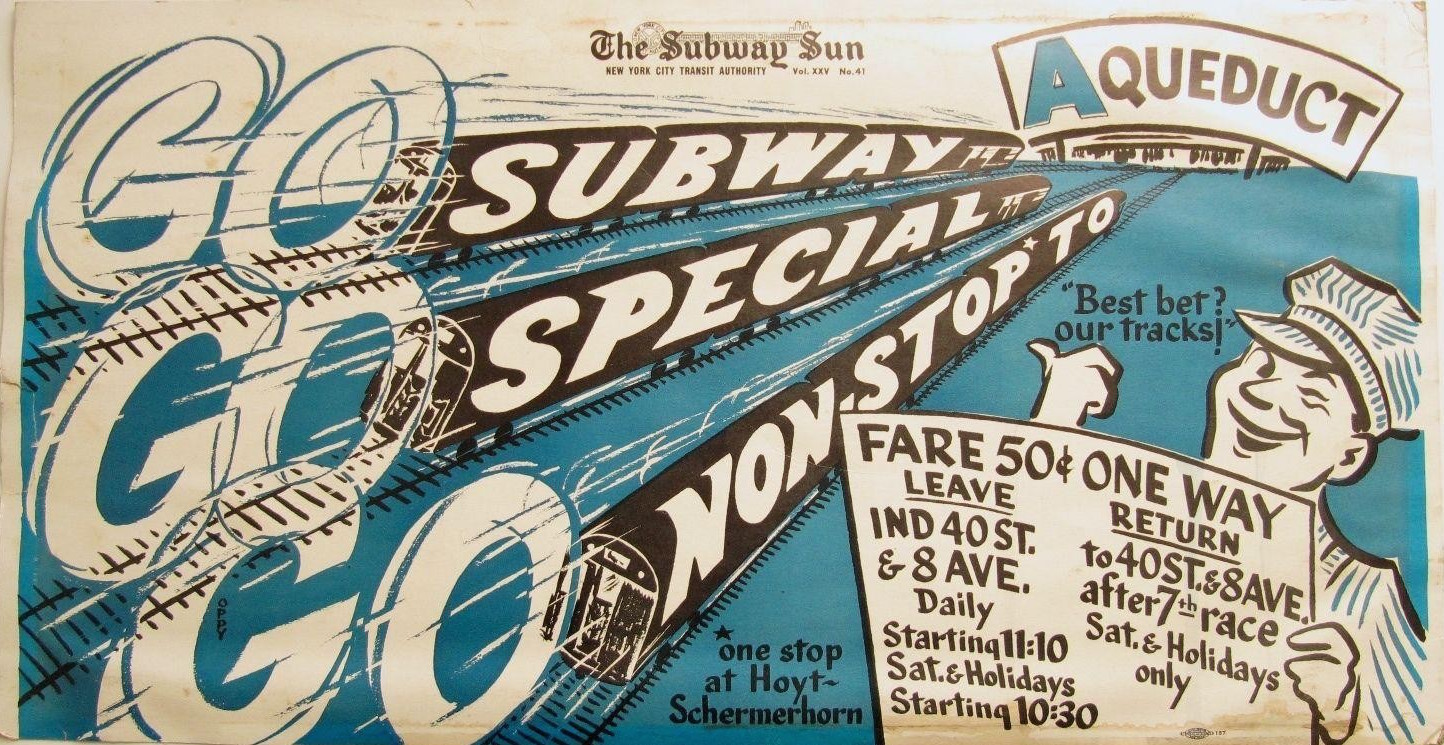
Aqueduct Racetrack poster

On the start of service in September 1959, extra-fare "Aqueduct Special" (signed as S) trains ran nonstop from the lower level of the 42nd Street–Port Authority Bus Terminal in Manhattan until it crossed over to the northbound platform to discharge passengers at the racetrack. A trial run took place on June 2, 1959, with the running time to the track being about 29 minutes. Transit officials said that the actual time of the specials would be thirty minutes at a minimum as the pace of the train was too swift. Aboard the train were 200 members of the National Association of State Racing Commissioners. The fare was initially 50 cents. One train, on weekdays and Saturdays, left from the Hoyt–Schermerhorn Streets station. That station's now-closed outer platforms were used to segregate passengers using the special service. Later on, all trains would stop at Hoyt–Schermerhorn Streets.

=== Modifications ===
==== 1950s to 1980s ====
On September 22, 1959, the NYCTA added five "Daily Double" trains on weekdays and eight on Saturdays, doubling the original number of trains. The Aqueduct Special reduced travel time between Manhattan and the racetrack to 35 minutes. Return trips would operate on Saturdays and holidays.

Increased service was provided during the 1960 spring meeting with Saturday and holiday service. During its first year, the service carried 341,000 riders. During the 1960s the extra fare was collected at special turnstiles at the three stations served by the special. Larger tokens were used. (Note: One of the tokens issued was a 28 mm (1.1 in) token, which was used only for Aqueduct Specials from 1966 to 1980. Another "special" token, which was 23 mm (0.91 in), was only used for a short time period in the early 1980s.) On July 5, 1966, the fare on the Aqueduct Special was raised to 75 cents. The fare was raised to $1 on January 4, 1970. The fare was raised from a $1 to $1.50 in February 1972. Later on the fare was lowered back to $1. Apparently the fare was lowered even further, as a NYCTA Car Card (advertisement) stated the fare was reduced to 75 cents in October 1974.

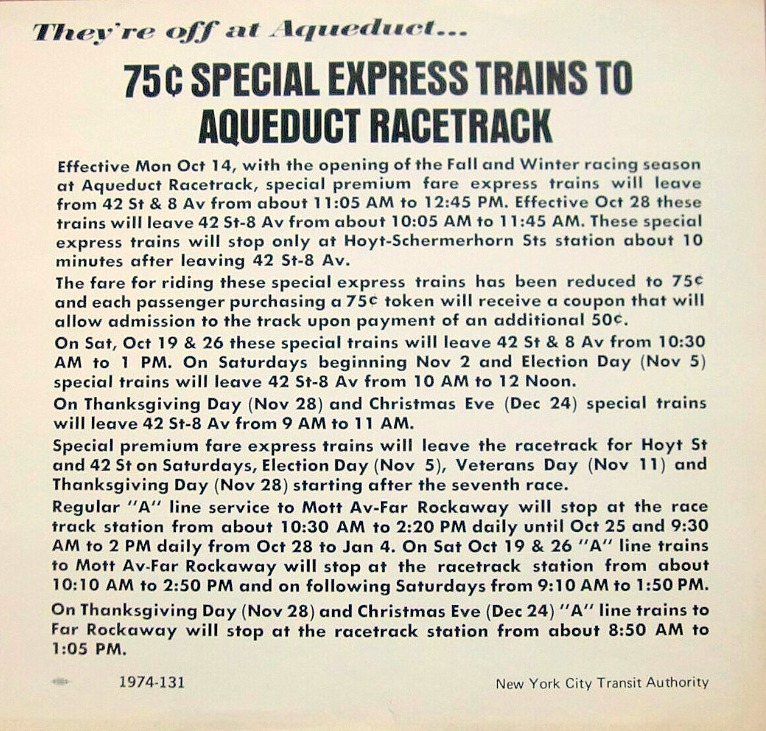

The fare was raised back to $1.50 on June 28, 1980.

In October 1966, the NYRA reached its final agreement to cover the $5,000 cost of the maintenance and the operation of the station. The NYRA last made these payments for the 1974-1975 racing season.

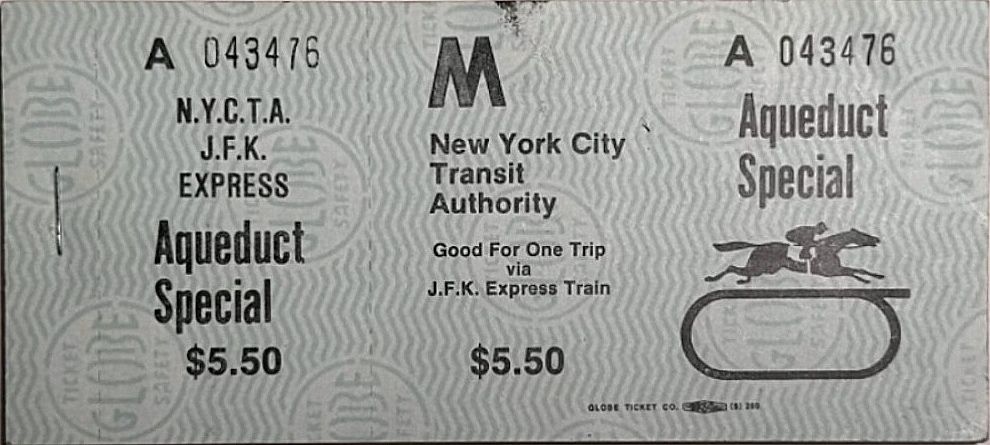
Aqueduct Special ticket

Beginning on April 15, 1978, during racing season one train ran from 57th Street on the IND Sixth Avenue Line to Aqueduct Racetrack, leaving 57th Street at 11 A.M. and arriving at Aqueduct at 11:35 AM. The train left for the return trip after the final race. In September 1978, the JFK Express began service and stopped at this station on racing days. (Note: This is also evident in the following image, in which a JFK Express train is stopping at the station, and there is a sign indicating where the train stops at the platform.) The Aqueduct Specials ceased operation altogether in October 1981. At the time of their discontinuance the fare was $3, and it was being replaced by the more expensive $5 JFK Express fare.

==== 1990s to present ====
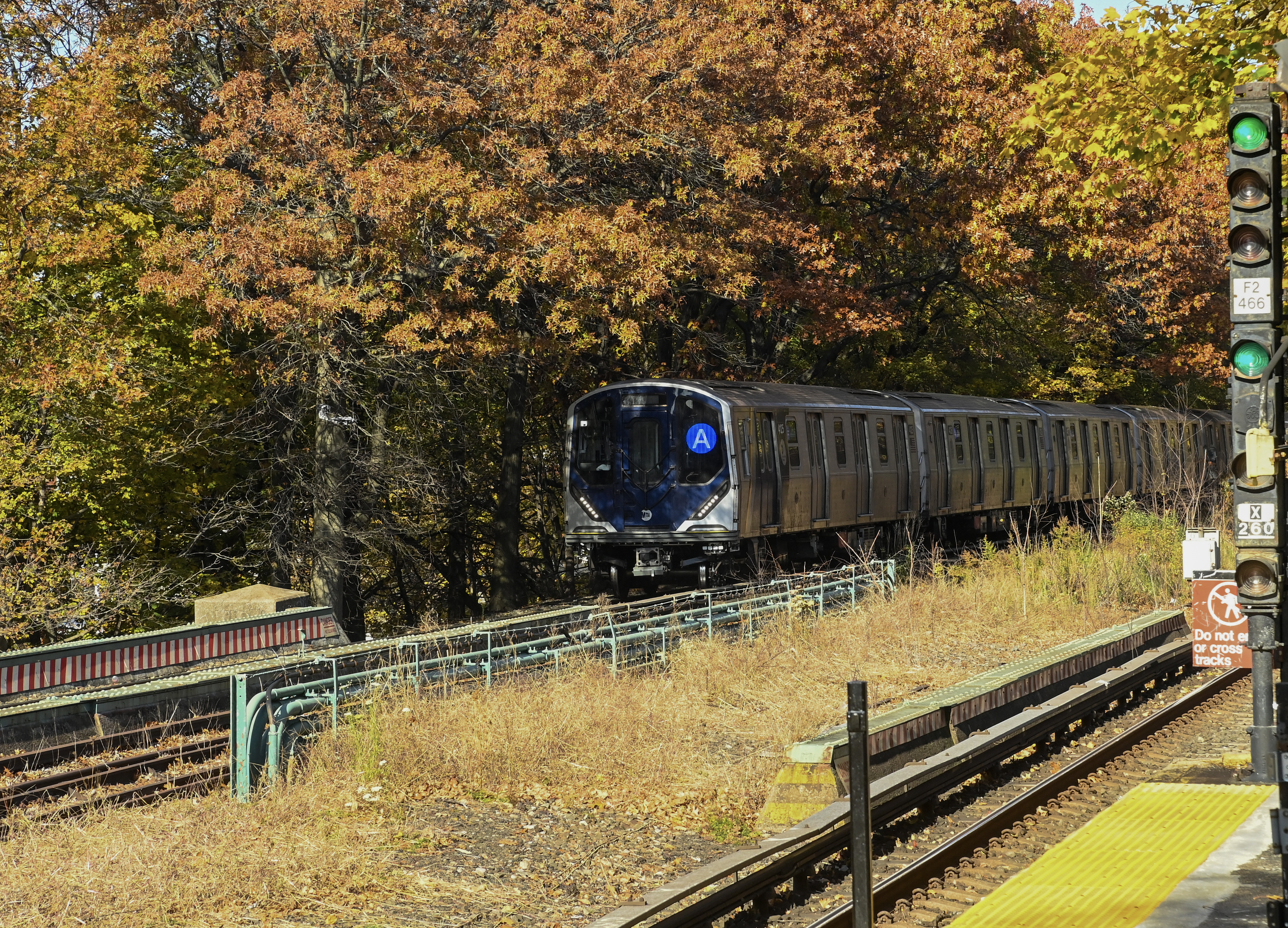
A southbound A train bypassing the station

The JFK Express was discontinued in 1990, and the station started to be closed throughout the day. The station reopened on October 22, 1997, (Note: While the station is shown on the September 1997 subway map, and in an A train timetable for September 1997, the station had not yet opened.) for the racing season at Aqueduct Racetrack, following an agreement with the NYRA, which believed that the 1,700 feet (520 m) distance from the Aqueduct—North Conduit Avenue station to Aqueduct Racetrack reduced transit usage and attendance at the racetrack. The agreement took effect on October 1, 1997, and was set to expire on September 30, 1999. As part of the agreement, the northern underpass entrance at Aqueduct—North Conduit Avenue would be reopened, shortening the walking distance for people arriving at Aqueduct Racetrack by 900 feet (270 m). The station was reopened using new MetroCard-only High Entrance/Exit Turnstiles (HEETs), and without a token booth, allowing it to be unstaffed at all times. Though MetroCards were not sold at the station, they were sold at betting windows at Aqueduct Racetrack. This was one of the first stations in the system to have HEETs.

It cost $140,000 to reopen the station and install the HEETs and to reopen the entrance at North Conduit Avenue, with an additional annual operating and maintenance cost of $37,000. The NYRA provided $40,000 over two years to help pay for the reopening of the station. The remaining service along the line would only be scheduled to stop on race days, generally Wednesday through Sunday, between 11 a.m. and 7 p.m., though some trains stopped here regardless of the time of day.

On April 28, 2011, the station was closed and underwent a $15 million renovation. This renovation was sponsored by the Resorts World Casino (or "Racino"), which had opened at the racetrack in 2011 and wanted to create a direct connection from the station to the casino. The station was scheduled to reopen in early 2012, but its reopening was delayed until August 13, 2013. The renovation added new staircases to street level, an enclosed passageway between the station and casino, and an elevator from the street to platform level to make the station ADA-accessible. The station also began operating 24 hours a day. In 2013, there was a proposal to rename this station to Aqueduct–Resorts World Casino, and to add a platform for Rockaway-bound trains. As of July 2012, the Metropolitan Transportation Authority (MTA) has withheld approvals to construct a southbound platform. The station was cleaned and repaired in 2023 as part of the MTA's Re-New-Vation program.

== Station layout ==
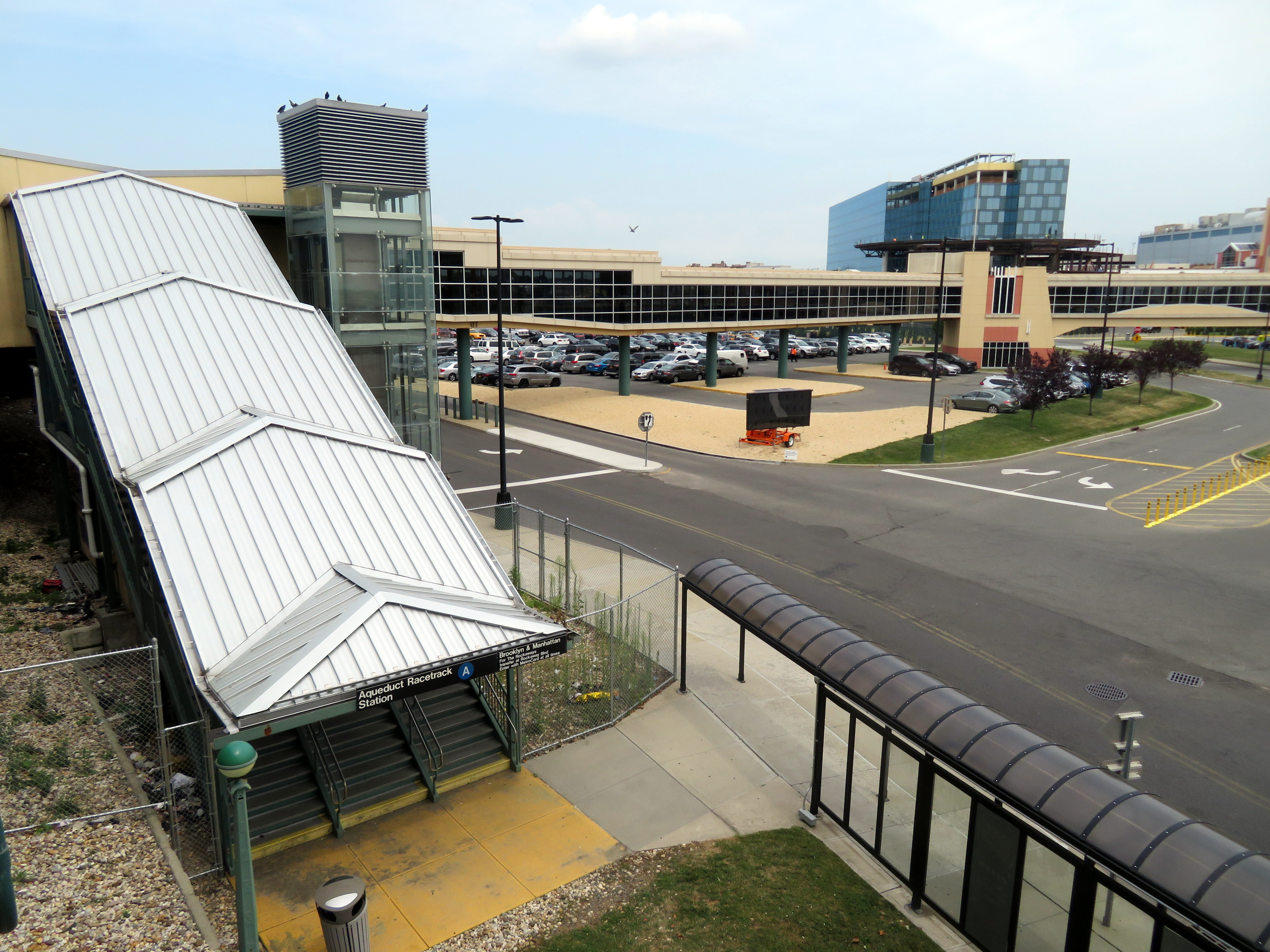
The southernmost of the two new staircases added in the 2013 renovations

The subway station is served by northbound A trains at all times. The station is between Aqueduct–North Conduit Avenue to the south and Rockaway Boulevard to the north. Southbound trains run directly from Rockaway Boulevard to Aqueduct–North Conduit Avenue without stopping at Aqueduct Racetrack. In the summertime on weekends during the day, Rockaway Park Shuttle trains are extended four stations to Rockaway Boulevard from their normal northern terminus at Broad Channel, so they also serve this station.

=== Tracks and service ===
Located on an embankment, the station has four tracks with only the outer two used in revenue service. The two center express tracks have been disconnected from the line and permanently removed. North of this station, a portion of the southbound express track connects with the southbound local track at its north end, and ends at a bumper block at its southern end. This section of track can be used for revenue service or work train layups, but this use has been made completely redundant because of the nearby Pitkin Yard serving as the primary layup yard instead. North of the station, the line's northbound track switches to the position of the former southbound express track to head onto the Liberty Avenue elevated structure.

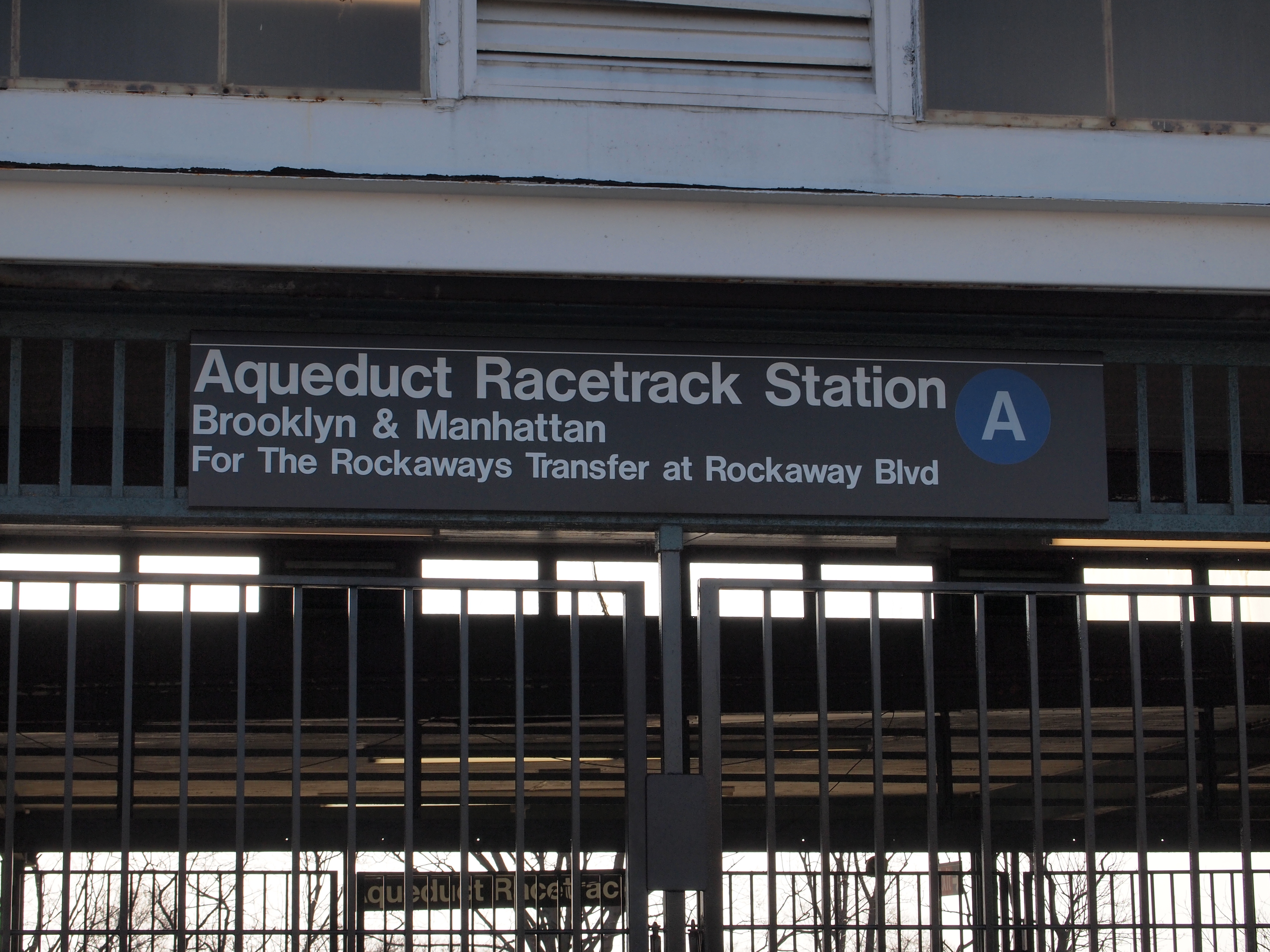
Station sign telling Rockaway-bound passengers to transfer at Rockaway Boulevard, the next station north, since there is no platform for Rockaway-bound trains

The station is the only through stop in the New York City Subway to serve trains in a single direction. (Note: Although Dyckman Street on the A train and 145th Street on the 3 train both have two platforms, both stations' northbound platforms are exit-only. The loops at City Hall and South Ferry are closed, but they are terminal stations. The New York City Subway map shows that Aqueduct Racetrack is the only non-terminal station that permanently and exclusively serves trains in one direction (excluding stations being renovated at the time).) There is one side platform located on the northbound side, with one exit leading directly to Aqueduct Racetrack, serving northbound trains heading toward Brooklyn and Manhattan. Southbound trains do not serve the station but stop at the Aqueduct–North Conduit Avenue station, 900 feet (270 m) to the south. In the past, southbound trains have terminated at this station using a crossover located to the north of the station. This station was originally advertised as "open on racing days", but some trains stopped here regardless of the time of day; riders could not always exit the station, depending on whether the racetrack was open. Resorts World Casino runs a shuttle bus between Aqueduct Racetrack and Aqueduct–North Conduit Avenue.

=== Exits ===
This station has four High Entrance/Exit Turnstiles and several emergency exit gates (one of which is equipped with an AutoGate OMNY reader) but no station agent's booth or OMNY Vending Machines. Although OMNY can technically be purchased at any subway station in the system, the Metropolitan Transportation Authority (MTA) considers the station to be linked with Aqueduct–North Conduit Avenue located approximately 900 feet (270 m) to the south, which has a full-time station agent's booth and OMNY machines. Two wide staircases and the elevator lead down from platform level to the parking lots in front of the racetrack. A sidewalk on the western side of Aqueduct Road leads south from Aqueduct Racetrack to the North Conduit Avenue station; the main fare control area is located at the south end of that station at North Conduit Avenue. At the north end of the passageway at Pitkin Avenue is a gate which, when open, allows access between the station and racetrack and the local community. The glass-enclosed bridge, called the "SkyBridge", is temperature-controlled and provides another ADA-accessible entrance into the station. It leads directly to the Resorts World Casino. Formerly, the only entrance to the station was through a large wide passageway (similar to those at Mets–Willets Point), which led directly to the racetrack.

== Ridership ==
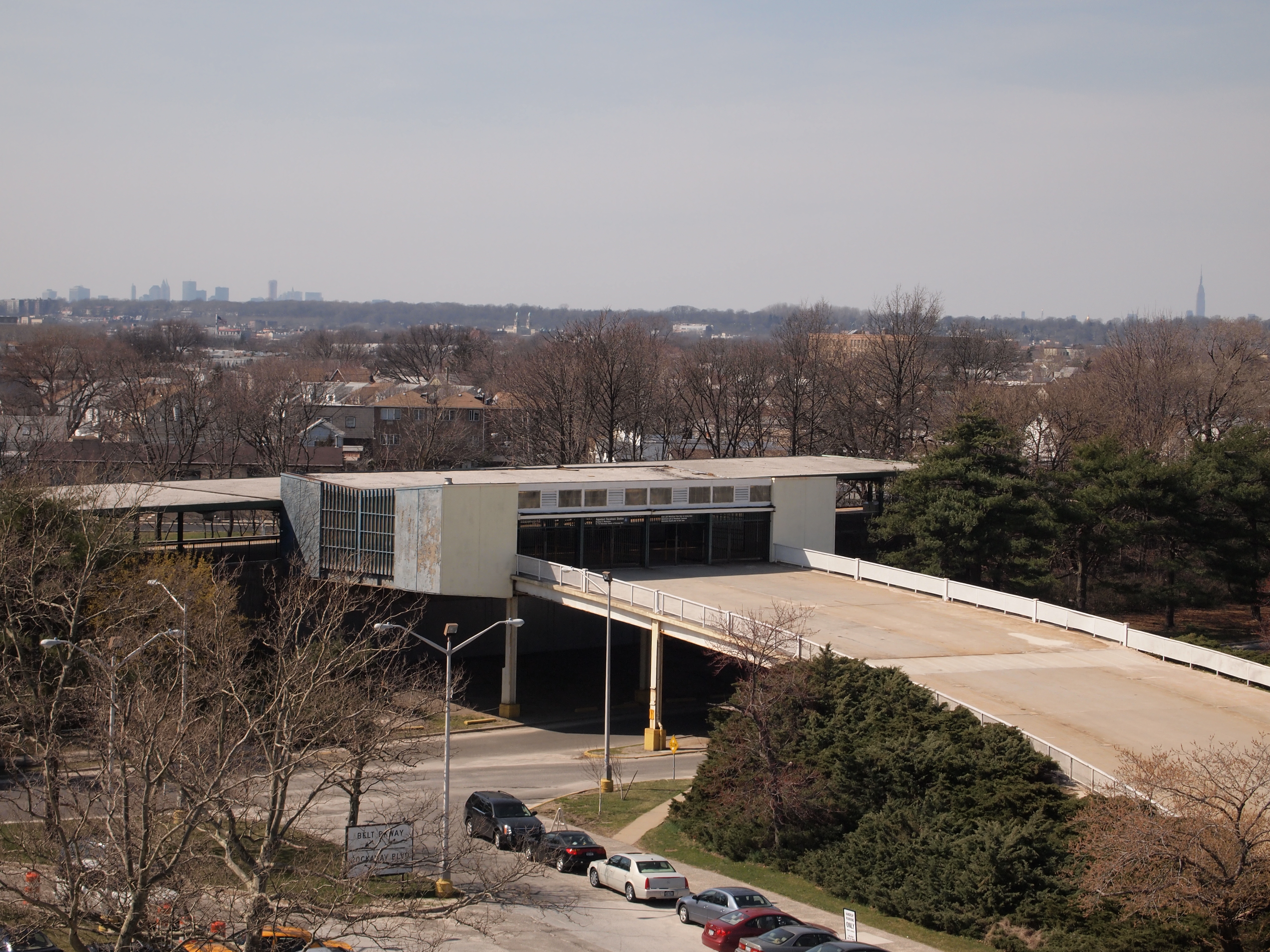
The former passageway to the racetrack in 2010

The station is not well-used compared to other stations in the system, as it mainly serves Aqueduct Racetrack. During the 1970s, ridership at the station declined, from 1.1 million passengers in 1975 to 573,000 in 1979.

From 2005 to 2009, the station was the second least used station in the system (and the least used station that was open for use). (Note: These counts included Cortlandt Street–World Trade Center in Manhattan, which was closed for 17 years following the September 11, 2001 attacks, and as such had no ridership at all during that time.) As of 2007, ridership was higher on Saturdays than on weekdays (with an average of 58 riders on weekdays and 895 on Saturdays). A 2014 analysis by The Wall Street Journal found that 72.6 percent of riders at the Aqueduct Racetrack station received a senior citizens' discount.

In 2009, the station had 27,004 entries, making the station among the system's least-used. This amounted to only 52 boardings per weekday in 2009, representing a 71.6 percent decrease from the station's 1990 ridership. In 2010, there were 29,644 recorded entries, and in 2011, there were 54,183 entries. Since the station was closed through 2012, there were no boardings, but after full-time service was restored to the station in 2013, there was a significantly higher ridership, with 213,601 recorded entries in 2013 and 630,644 entries in 2014. The increase in ridership at the station and the nearby Aqueduct–North Conduit Avenue station since 2010 has been attributed to the closure of the New York City Off-Track Betting Corporation, that year and the opening of the casino in 2011. In 2019, the station had 601,436 boardings (down from 732,091 in 2018), making it the 400th busiest station in the 422-station system. This amounted to an average of 1,594 passengers per weekday.
