= JFK Express =

New York City Subway service (1978–90)

- JFK Express

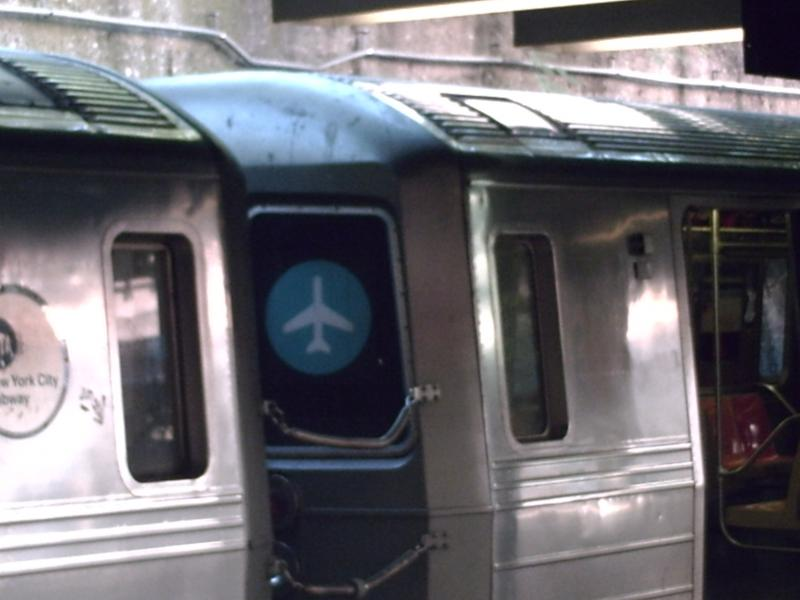
- The JFK Express bullet on an R68 serving the Franklin Avenue Shuttle

- Note: Service began at 57th Street prior to 1989
- Northern end: 21st Street–Queensbridge
- Southern end: Howard Beach–JFK Airport
- Stations: 12 (9 until 1989)
- Started service: September 23, 1978; 48 years ago
- Discontinued: April 15, 1990; 36 years ago

The JFK Express, advertised as The Train to The Plane, was a limited express service of the New York City Subway, connecting Midtown Manhattan to John F. Kennedy International Airport (JFK Airport). It operated between 1978 and 1990. Passengers paid a premium fare to ride JFK Express trains. Its route bullet was colored turquoise and contained an aircraft symbol.

For most of its history, the JFK Express operated along the IND Sixth Avenue Line; IND Fulton Street Line; and IND Rockaway Line between its northern terminal at 57th Street–Sixth Avenue in Manhattan and its southern terminal at Howard Beach–JFK Airport in Queens. At Howard Beach, passengers transferred to shuttle buses to reach the airport itself. During the JFK Express's last six months of operation, it was extended northward along the IND 63rd Street Line to 21st Street–Queensbridge, also in Queens. The service primarily used R46 subway cars.

== Fares and rolling stock ==
=== Fares ===
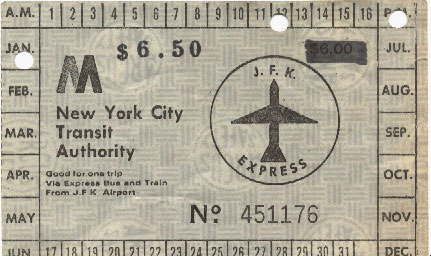
Ticket

Passengers purchased premium-fare tickets on board, and an onboard transit clerk on each train punched passengers' tickets. In addition, there were transit police officers aboard to provide protection for travelers. The initial fare was $3.50, and the fare for the shuttle bus was $1.00. On January 1, 1979, airline and airport employees were provided a discounted book of twenty tickets, selling for $25. On July 3, 1981, the fare was raised from $4 to $5. When the service was discontinued in 1990, the fare was $6.75.

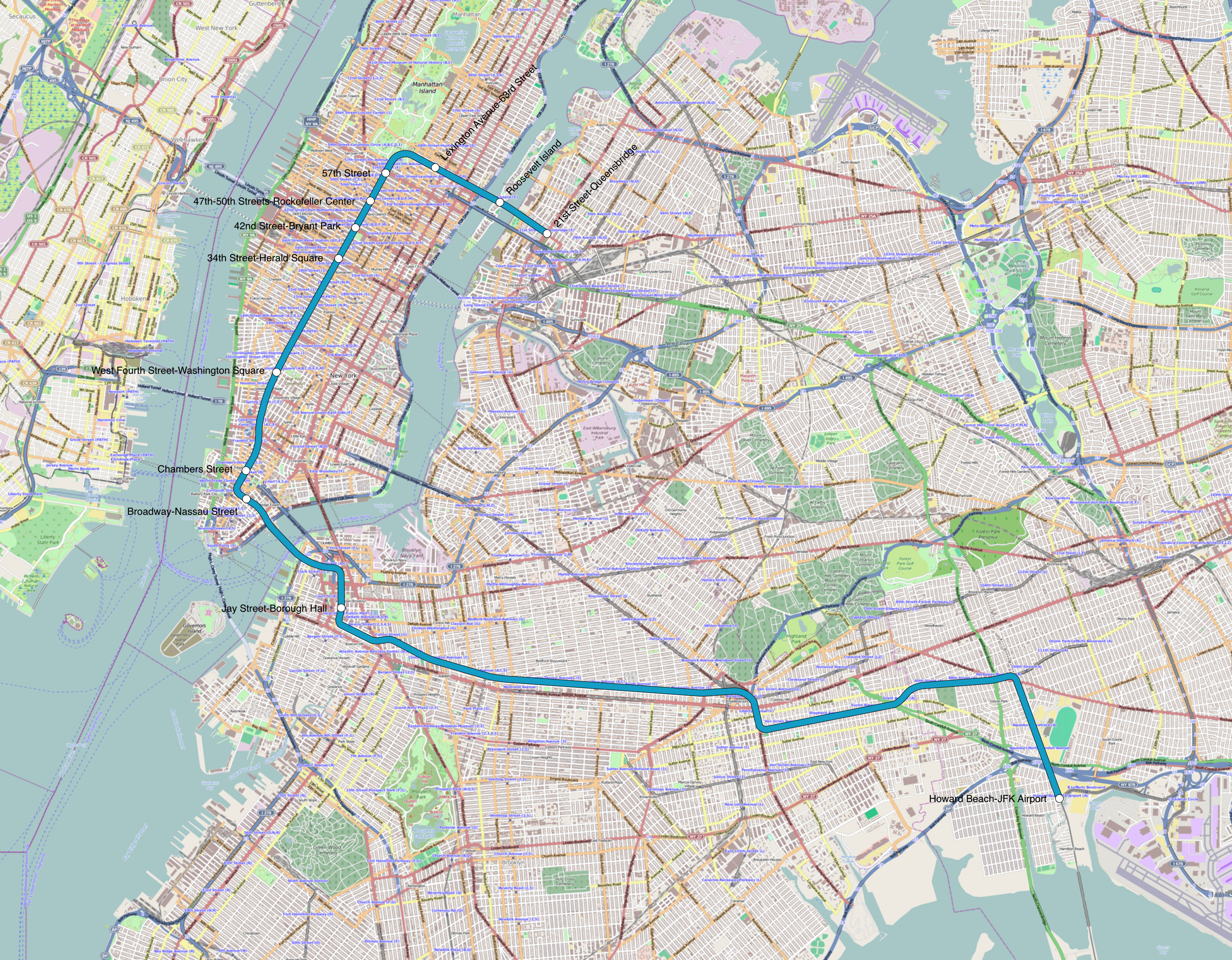
To scale line map

JFK Express – train and bus loop fares (with regular subway fare)
date	to JFK Airport via JFK Express	from JFK Airport via JFK Express	from JFK Airport via A train	JFK Airport Loop Express Bus only	regular subway fare
September 23, 1978	$3.00	$3.50	$1.20	$1.00	.50
June 28, 1980	$3.40	$4.00	$1.50	$1.20	.60
July 3, 1981	$4.25	$5.00	$1.80	$1.50	.75
January 2, 1984	$5.10	$6.00	$2.00	$1.80	.90
January 6, 1986	$5.50	$6.50	$2.25	$2.00	$1.00
January 1, 1990	$5.60	$6.75	?	?	$1.15

=== Rolling stock ===
The JFK Express used R46s exclusively for most of its existence, although near its end R44s were used after major service changes took place on December 11, 1988. The trains were initially three cars long or 225 feet (69 m) in length. They later were four cars long or 300 feet (91 m) long, half the length of a typical B Division train. The cars featured luggage racks for airport-bound passengers.

== History ==
=== Introduction ===
1978 brochure

In spring 1978, the Port Authority of New York and New Jersey (PANYNJ) reached out to the Metropolitan Transportation Authority (MTA) to join a study evaluating long-term transportation improvements to JFK Airport. In summer 1978, the two agencies worked out the details for a service running to the Howard Beach station on the IND Rockaway Line. The station was renamed Howard Beach—JFK Airport, and a transfer terminal to shuttle buses was built. Since air passengers were perceived to be more sensitive to the quality of service, and less sensitive to fare levels, it was decided to operate a special service to Howard Beach at a fare of $3.50, fifty cents cheaper than bus service operated to the airport by Carey Bus Lines. It was decided to have the route operate via the Sixth Avenue Line instead of the Eighth Avenue Line due to its proximity to the economic center of Midtown Manhattan, to Herald Square, Rockefeller Center, and hotels along 50th Street. In addition, 57th Street–Sixth Avenue station provided an optimal terminal for the service as it was underutilized. The MTA announced plans for an "experimental" subway–bus service between Manhattan and JFK Airport on June 27, 1978.

The JFK Express began operation on September 23, 1978, with a three-car train originating at 57th Street. The MTA created several 30-second long television commercials to promote the new service. Trains ran daily from 5:00 a.m. to 1:00 a.m. on 20 minute headways. The route began at 57th Street and ran express on the IND Sixth Avenue Line to West Fourth Street–Washington Square, where it switched to the IND Eighth Avenue Line and ran express to Jay Street–Borough Hall in Downtown Brooklyn. From that point on, it ran non-stop on the IND Fulton Street Line and IND Rockaway Line to Howard Beach–JFK Airport. In its first year, 832,428 passengers rode the JFK Express, greater than an estimate of 550,000 to 850,000 trips for when the service became better known and fully established.

The JFK Express attracted 25 percent of the market for travel between Manhattan and JFK Airport, and increased the share of trips to the airport by public transportation. While the MTA received $2.63 million in revenue from the service, it cost $6.5 million to operate it, meaning an operating loss of $3.9 million. The cost of operating the service was $3 million greater than expected due to the decision to have railroad clerks collect tickets on board the train, and due to the service's expanded hours of operation to 2 a.m. during the Carey Bus strike from June 27 to July 23, 1979. On November 4, 1979, the schedule of service was modified to have trains run every 30 minutes between 5 and 6 a.m., every 20 minutes from 6 a.m. to 9 p.m. and every 24 minutes from 9 p.m. to 1 a.m.

=== Modifications ===
Within a few years of its inauguration, the service was being criticized as a poor use of resources. The JFK Express proved to be unsuccessful, seeing low ridership in part because the service did not actually serve any airline terminals, but rather transferred passengers to a shuttle bus service that was several hundred yards from the station. In May 1980, the MTA executive director, John Simpson, recommended that the express train be discontinued, stating that ridership on the line stabilized at 1.3 million yearly riders, and the yearly deficit rose to $2.5 million. In June 1980, members of the MTA board voted to make the JFK Express a permanent service, stating that a mass transit link to JFK Airport was necessary.

In June 1983, the New York City Transit Authority, along with other service changes, planned to change service on the JFK Express. The JFK Express would have been extended to Rockaway Park–Beach 116th Street, and the $5 fare and the special guard would be eliminated, making it like any other subway line. Trains would be 8 cars long instead of 4 cars long, and the headway between trains would be 18 minutes, instead of 20 minutes. The shuttle bus fare would be reduced to 75 cents, the same as the subway fare; a passenger traveling between the airport and any subway stop except Howard Beach would pay $1.50 in total. The proposal was still being reviewed in January 1984; it never came to fruition.

At times, regular passengers were allowed on the trains and no fares were charged due to disruptions on other services; this included the 1988 closure of the Williamsburg Bridge, when trains on the BMT Nassau Street Line and BMT Jamaica Line were rerouted. Between December 11, 1988, and October 29, 1989, on weekday evenings between 9 p.m. and 1 a.m., passengers were allowed to ride the JFK Express between 57th Street and 47th–50th Streets–Rockefeller Center without paying the extra fare as it was the only service running between these two stations during those times. Some passengers paid the extra fare to get to Aqueduct Racetrack during racing days, when the JFK Express would stop at Aqueduct Racetrack station.

=== Discontinuation ===
In October 1989, the NYCTA proposed eliminating the JFK Express, citing that it had not attracted enough passengers. At the time 3,200 passengers were using the train per day, down from a high of between 4,000 and 5,000 passengers that used it at the beginning of the service's operation. The executive vice president of the NYCTA, George Miller, said that eliminating the service would save $7 million a year and free 144 transit workers and 12 subway cars for more cost-efficient subway runs. It was determined that 47 percent of the riders of the JFK Express were commuters from Howard Beach and the Rockaways who were willing to pay for the premium service. Trains were running every hour by this point.

On October 29, 1989, the IND 63rd Street Line opened and the JFK Express was extended to 21st Street–Queensbridge, skipping Roosevelt Island. This extension was short-lived, as service was discontinued on April 15, 1990, due to low ridership, with as few as 3,200 riders per day. The bus service, connecting the Howard Beach–JFK Airport station and the airport proper, continued after JFK Express service ended, and was the only link between the airport and the Howard Beach station at the time. Passengers preferred the A train, which was cheaper and ran more often. Ridership on the A to the airport increased after the discontinuation of the JFK Express; in 1995, about 1 million passengers used the A to the airport.

Since the discontinuation of the JFK Express, the A train has continued to serve the Howard Beach–JFK Airport station. The JFK shuttle bus service remained in operation until the AirTrain JFK, a Port Authority of New York and New Jersey-operated people mover system, replaced it on December 17, 2003. The AirTrain JFK also connects with the Long Island Rail Road at Jamaica, and with the E, J, and Z trains to Manhattan at Sutphin Boulevard–Archer Avenue. A proposal, referred to as the Lower Manhattan–Jamaica/JFK Transportation Project, would provide express train service between JFK Airport and Lower Manhattan through Brooklyn. This would be similar to the JFK Express except that the service would be an extension of AirTrain JFK and operate via the LIRR's Atlantic Branch, providing a one-seat ride to the airport terminals.

== Final route ==
=== Service pattern ===
The following lines were used by the JFK Express service:

Line	Portion	Tracks
IND 63rd Street Line	full line	all
IND Sixth Avenue Line	north of West Fourth Street–Washington Square	express
IND Eighth Avenue Line	south of West Fourth Street–Washington Square	local
IND Fulton Street Line	Jay Street–Borough Hall to Euclid Avenue	express
IND Fulton Street Line	Euclid Avenue to Rockaway Boulevard	local
IND Rockaway Line	north of Howard Beach–JFK Airport	local

=== Stations ===
Station service legend
Stops all times except late nights	Stops every day during daytime hours only
Time period details
Disabled access	Station is compliant with the Americans with Disabilities Act
↑	Station is compliant with the Americans with Disabilities Act in the indicated direction only
↓	Station is compliant with the Americans with Disabilities Act in the indicated direction only
	Elevator access to mezzanine only

JFK Express	Station	Disabled access	Notes
Queens
Stops all times except late nights	21st Street–Queensbridge	Disabled access	New terminus after completion of IND 63rd Street Line; opened October 29, 1989
Manhattan
Stops all times except late nights	Lexington Avenue	Disabled access	Opened October 29, 1989
Stops all times except late nights	57th Street		Original terminus before IND 63rd Street Line opened
Stops all times except late nights	47th–50th Streets–Rockefeller Center		
Stops all times except late nights	42nd Street–Bryant Park		
Stops all times except late nights	34th Street–Herald Square		
Stops all times except late nights	West Fourth Street–Washington Square		
Stops all times except late nights	Chambers Street		
Stops all times except late nights	Broadway–Nassau Street		
Brooklyn
Stops all times except late nights	Jay Street–Borough Hall		
Queens
↑	Aqueduct Racetrack		Station served northbound trains only; open only during racing season at Aqueduct Racetrack
Stops all times except late nights	Howard Beach–JFK Airport		Transfer to Port Authority shuttle bus to airport terminals
