= Howard Beach–JFK Airport station =

New York City Subway station in Queens

Howard Beach–JFK Airport
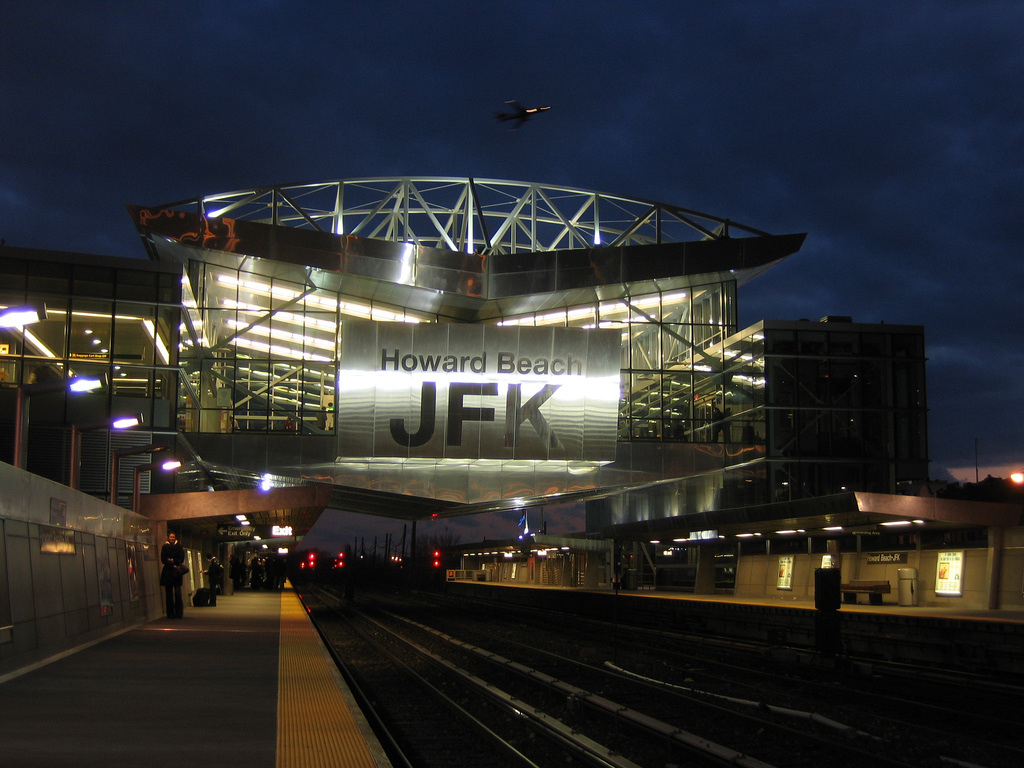
- View of the subway platforms and mezzanine at night

Station statistics
- Address: 159th Avenue & 103rd Street; Queens, New York
- Borough: Queens
- Locale: Howard Beach
- Coordinates: 40.6604°N 73.8303°W
- Division: B (IND, formerly LIRR Rockaway Beach Branch)
- Line: IND Rockaway Line
- Services: A (all times)
- Transit: MTA Bus: Q11; AirTrain JFK: Howard Beach
- Structure: At-grade (subway station); Elevated (AirTrain JFK station)
- Platforms: 2 side platforms (subway station); 1 island platform (AirTrain JFK station)
- Tracks: 4; 2 in regular service (subway station); 2 (AirTrain JFK station)

Other information
- Opened: April 1913; 113 years ago (LIRR station); December 17, 2003; 22 years ago (AirTrain JFK)
- Rebuilt: June 28, 1956; 70 years ago (subway station); December 17, 2003; 22 years ago (connection to AirTrain JFK)
- Accessible: Yes

Traffic
- 2025: 1,541,969 ▲68.5%
- Rank: 226 out of 423
Services
Preceding station	New York City Subway	Following station
Aqueduct–North Conduit Avenue toward Inwood–207th Street	A (New York City Subway service)	Broad Channel toward Far Rockaway–Mott Avenue
Former services
Preceding station	Long Island Rail Road	Following station
Aqueduct toward Woodside	Rockaway Beach Division	Hamilton Beach toward Gibson or Rockaway Park
Preceding station	Brooklyn Rapid Transit	Following station
Ozone Park toward Chambers Street	Union Elevated Broadway Line 1898–1917	Goose Creek toward Rockaway Park
Woodhaven Junction toward Park Row	Union Elevated Fifth Avenue Line 1899–1905	Goose Creek toward Rockaway Park
Preceding station	New York City Subway	Following station
Aqueduct Racetrack toward 21st Street–Queensbridge	JFK Express	Terminus
Jay Street–Borough Hall One-way operation	JFK Express	Terminus
Location
Location within New York City Subway
Location within New York City
Location within New York
Track layout
New York City Subway (lower level)
AirTrain JFK (upper level)
Street map
Station service legend
Symbol	Description
Stops all times	Stops all times
Stops rush hours in the peak direction only	Stops rush hours in the peak direction only

The Howard Beach–JFK Airport station is a local subway/people mover station complex located at Coleman Square between 159th Avenue and 103rd Street in Howard Beach, Queens. The New York City Subway portion of the station is on the IND Rockaway Line and is served by the Rockaway branch of the A train at all times and the Rockaway Park Shuttle in the summertime on weekends during the day. The AirTrain JFK portion of the station complex is served by the AirTrain's Howard Beach branch at all times.

The station was originally a Long Island Rail Road (LIRR) station along the Rockaway Beach Branch. The LIRR station opened in 1913 to replace the nearby Ramblersville station. The LIRR ceased operations at this station in 1950, and the New York City Transit Authority bought the section of the Rockaway Beach Branch that included this station in 1952. The subway station opened on June 28, 1956. Between 2000 and 2003, the subway station was completely reconstructed and the AirTrain JFK station was built. The rebuilt complex was completed on December 17, 2003, providing a rail link from the Howard Beach station to JFK Airport.

== History ==
The Howard Beach station in 1997, with its 1950s design prior to renovations.

The station originally opened in April 1913 as a Long Island Rail Road (LIRR) station, which replaced the former 1899-built Ramblersville station that was built 0.2 miles (0.32 km) to the south. In 1923, the station was retrofitted with sheltered sheds on both sides of the tracks. On May 8, 1950, a fire broke out between The Raunt and Broad Channel stations, destroying the trestle over Jamaica Bay, cutting service between Hamilton Beach and the Rockaways. The LIRR was bankrupt and unwilling to rebuild the trestle. As a result, the line was sold to the New York City Transit Authority in 1952.

On June 27, 1955, the Howard Beach station, along with all the rest of the Rockaway Beach Branch stations south of the now defunct Ozone Park station, was taken out of service for eight months for restructuring and upgrading of the tracks, so that they could accommodate subway service. During the project, the Howard Beach station, along with the Broad Channel and Far Rockaway stations, was completely rebuilt utilizing a modern design, which included a new overhead passageway between the two platforms. The design was created by architect J. Harold Sandifer, a native of the Rockaways. Many of the parts for the station were prefabricated, speeding construction. On June 28, 1956, the station reopened as a subway station along with the rest of the line. The previous Long Island Rail Road station at this location was razed. Inauguration ceremonies were held at the station as well as at Euclid Avenue in Brooklyn.

In June 1978, the Metropolitan Transportation Authority (MTA) announced plans for an "experimental" subway-bus service between Manhattan and JFK Airport, terminating at the Howard Beach subway station where passengers could transfer to a free shuttle bus to the airport. The JFK Express began operation on September 23, 1978, operating as a premium service, with riders paying the additional fare on board. The service ran express on the IND Sixth Avenue Line to West Fourth Street–Washington Square, where it switched to the IND Eighth Avenue Line and ran express to Jay Street–Borough Hall in Downtown Brooklyn. From that point on, it ran non-stop on the IND Fulton Street Line and IND Rockaway Line to Howard Beach–JFK Airport. In its early years, the service was more successful, with 6,000 passengers carried on the maximum day. However, the premium service lost its allure as the rest of the subway system was improved, with reduced crime and new graffiti-free trains. As a result, more passengers opted to take the slower A to Howard Beach. The JFK Express was discontinued on April 15, 1990 due to low ridership, with as few as 3,200 riders per day. The bus service, connecting the station and JFK, continued after JFK Express service ended, and was the only link between the airport and the Howard Beach station at the time. Ridership on the A to the Airport increased after the discontinuation of the JFK Express: in 1995, about 1 million passengers used the A to the Airport.

The station was extensively reconstructed in the early 2000s, undergoing a $50 million overhaul to connect the subway station to the new AirTrain JFK. The project was designed by STV Group and financed by the Port Authority of New York and New Jersey. During the reconstruction of the station, the original subway platforms were demolished and temporary platforms were erected in the center trackways while the new platforms and mezzanine were built. During off-peak hours, trains utilized a single track. The AirTrain structure around the station was completed in 2001, and the AirTrain station opened and began charging fares on December 17, 2003, at which time the free shuttle bus was discontinued. The transfer was popular, with 4 million people transferring between the subway and the AirTrain from 2003 to 2007. The AirTrain was designed with the same track height and track gauge as those of the subway, to facilitate a future extension of the subway over the AirTrain system.

Due to extensive damage to the IND Rockaway Line by Hurricane Sandy in 2012, this was the southern terminal for A trains that normally traveled to the Rockaways while the line south of the station was being repaired. Full service to the Rockaways was restored on May 30, 2013. Starting in January 2025, southbound A service to the Rockaways was again truncated to Howard Beach–JFK Airport for four months.

== Station layout ==
The subway station is served by the A train at all times and is between Broad Channel to the south and Aqueduct–North Conduit Avenue to the north. During the summertime on weekends during the day, the Rockaway Park Shuttle is extended four stations beyond its normal northern terminus at Broad Channel to Rockaway Boulevard, so the shuttle also serves this station. The AirTrain station is the terminus of the AirTrain's Howard Beach route; the next stop to the east is Lefferts Boulevard.

The station's mezzanine is located in a modern, temperature-controlled, glass-enclosed building above the subway platforms and tracks, measuring 90 feet (27 m) across, with a large stainless steel sign on either side reading "Howard Beach JFK." The mezzanine building contains a small token booth and three turnstile banks between the subway, the AirTrain JFK, and the unpaid area.

=== New York City Subway platforms ===
The grade-level New York City Subway station has two side platforms and four tracks with the two center express tracks not used in revenue service. The southbound express track has been severed and has permanently been removed from service, while the northbound express track is unused in regular service. South of the station, there are switches and crossovers between all four tracks before the two outer tracks merge with the center ones. The two-track line then crosses Jamaica Bay to Broad Channel, which is 3.5 miles (5.6 km) to the south. The crossing is the longest stretch of line between two consecutive stations in the system. North of the station, the line ascends on an embankment to crossover Belt Parkway and Conduit Avenue.

Both platforms have concrete windscreens on either end and steel canopies at the portions underneath the center station building. The platforms are offset, with the southbound platform extending slightly to the north, and the northbound platform extending slightly further south. A set of staircases and escalators from each subway platform go up to the station building. There are also two elevators from each platform to the station building. Outside the subway's and AirTrain's fare control, two elevators lead from the station building to street level.

The Rockaway-bound platform has two High Entry/Exit Turnstiles and one exit-only turnstile leading to a short staircase that goes down to the intersection of 159th Road and 103rd Street. The Brooklyn-bound platform has a set of emergency doors leading to the parking lot just north of the AirTrain JFK station; they are normally locked, but were in use from December 2012 to May 2013 as a connection to a temporary shuttle bus service instituted after Hurricane Sandy.

Prior to the 2000s reconstruction, the design of the station and overpass resembled that of the Broad Channel station.

=== AirTrain JFK platform ===
The AirTrain JFK portion of this station has two tracks and one island platform on the upper level of the station complex. The eastern end of the AirTrain platform leads to Parking Area C. Unlike the New York City Subway platforms, the AirTrain JFK platforms are entirely enclosed and feature platform screen doors, which help the station maintain a constant temperature and prevent passengers from falling onto the tracks. An array of sensors detect a train's position on the track, and only when it is properly aligned will the train's doors open. This enables the AirTrain to use automatic train operation without drivers.

The platform measures approximately 240 feet (73 m). The next stop to the southeast is Lefferts Boulevard. Since it is owned by the Port Authority, it uses a separate fare control from the subway; there are no free transfers between AirTrain JFK and the subway. Passengers must pay their fare when either entering or leaving the station, as this station and Jamaica are the only stations where fares are collected. OMNY machines are located on both sides of fare control.

=== Exits ===
The exit from the complex to the Howard Beach neighborhood is on the west side, with a twisting staircase and two elevators going down to the east side of 103rd Street/Coleman Square by the T-intersection with 159th Avenue. A connecting bridge on the east side of the station leads into the AirTrain JFK station. Two High Entry-Exit Turnstiles and one exit-only turnstile are located on the southbound subway platform and leads directly to Coleman Square. The exit on the northbound platform is exit-only, and two emergency gates lead to the parking lot for the Howard Beach–JFK Airport complex.

== Gallery ==
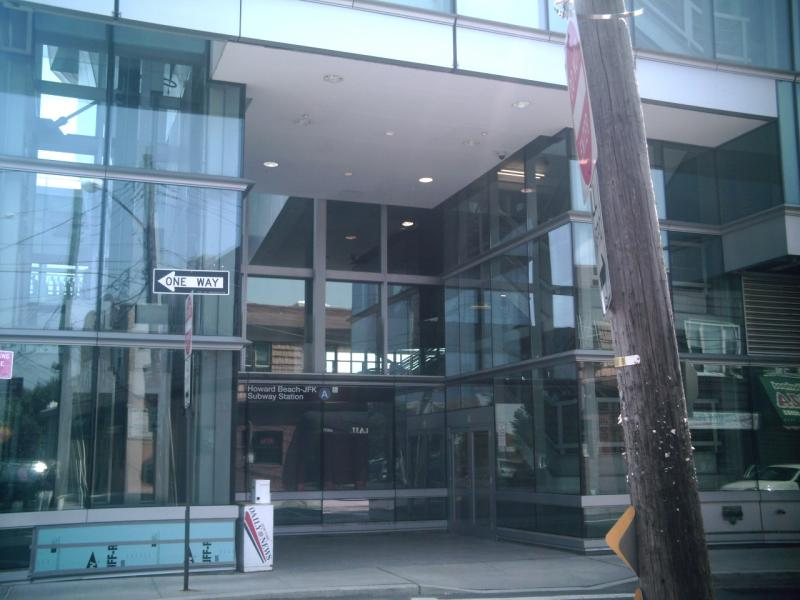
A view of the entrance to the station

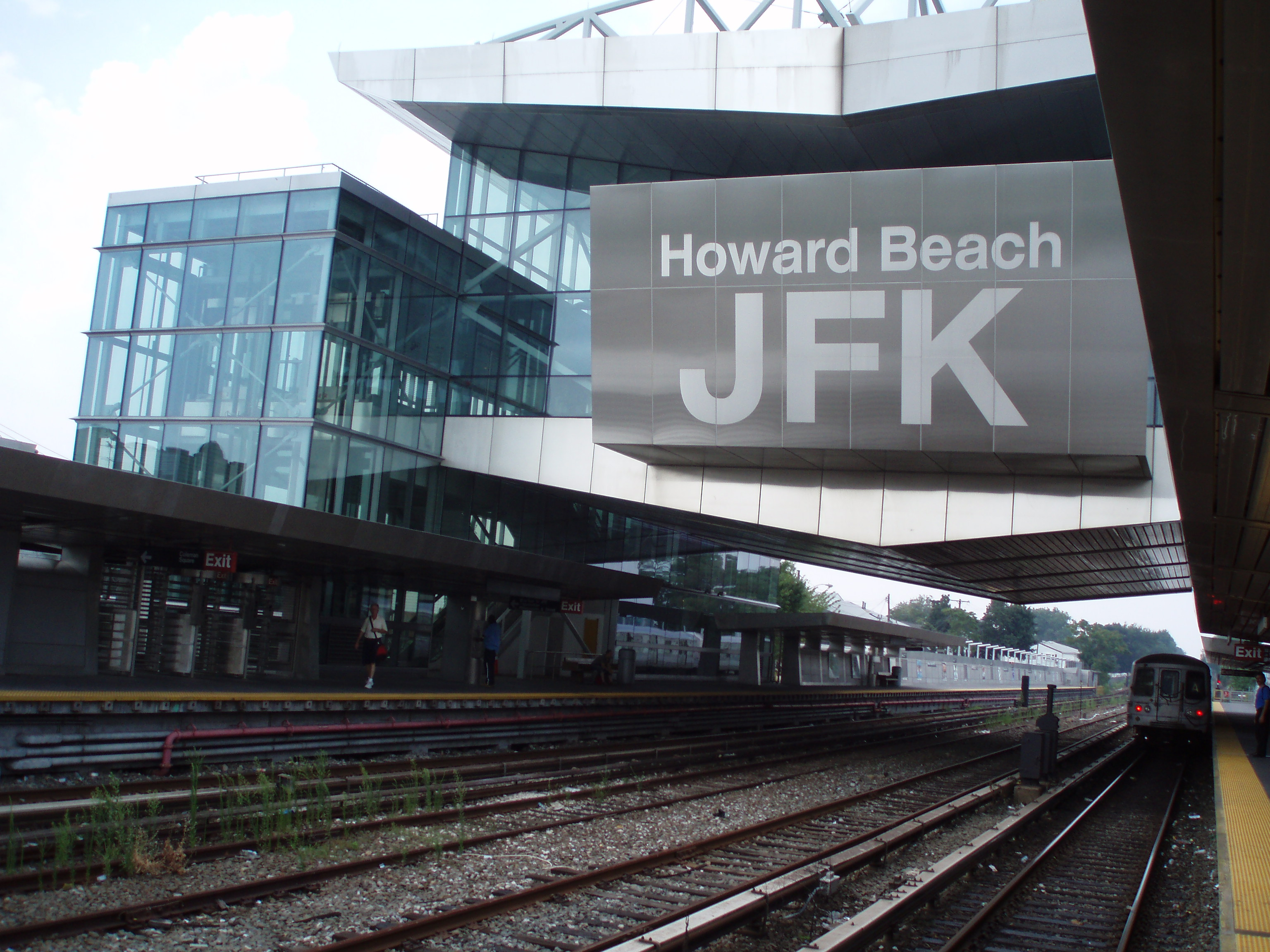
View of subway platforms, with the transfer building above the platforms

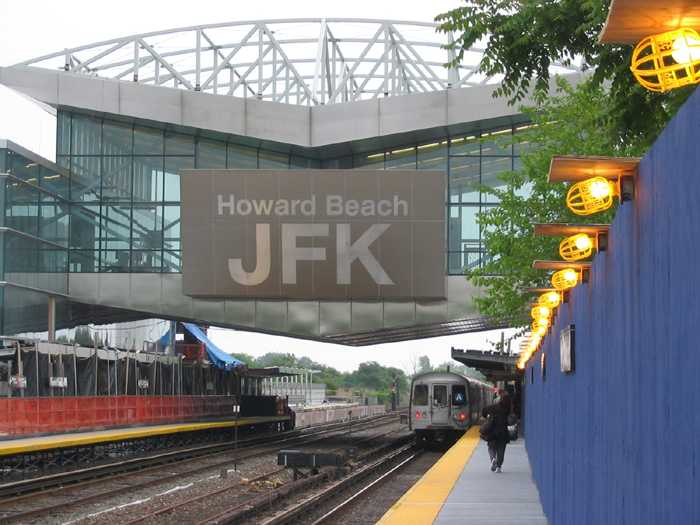
The station as it appeared as it was being reconstructed to allow for a transfer to AirTrain JFK in 2003; note the temporary platform (left)

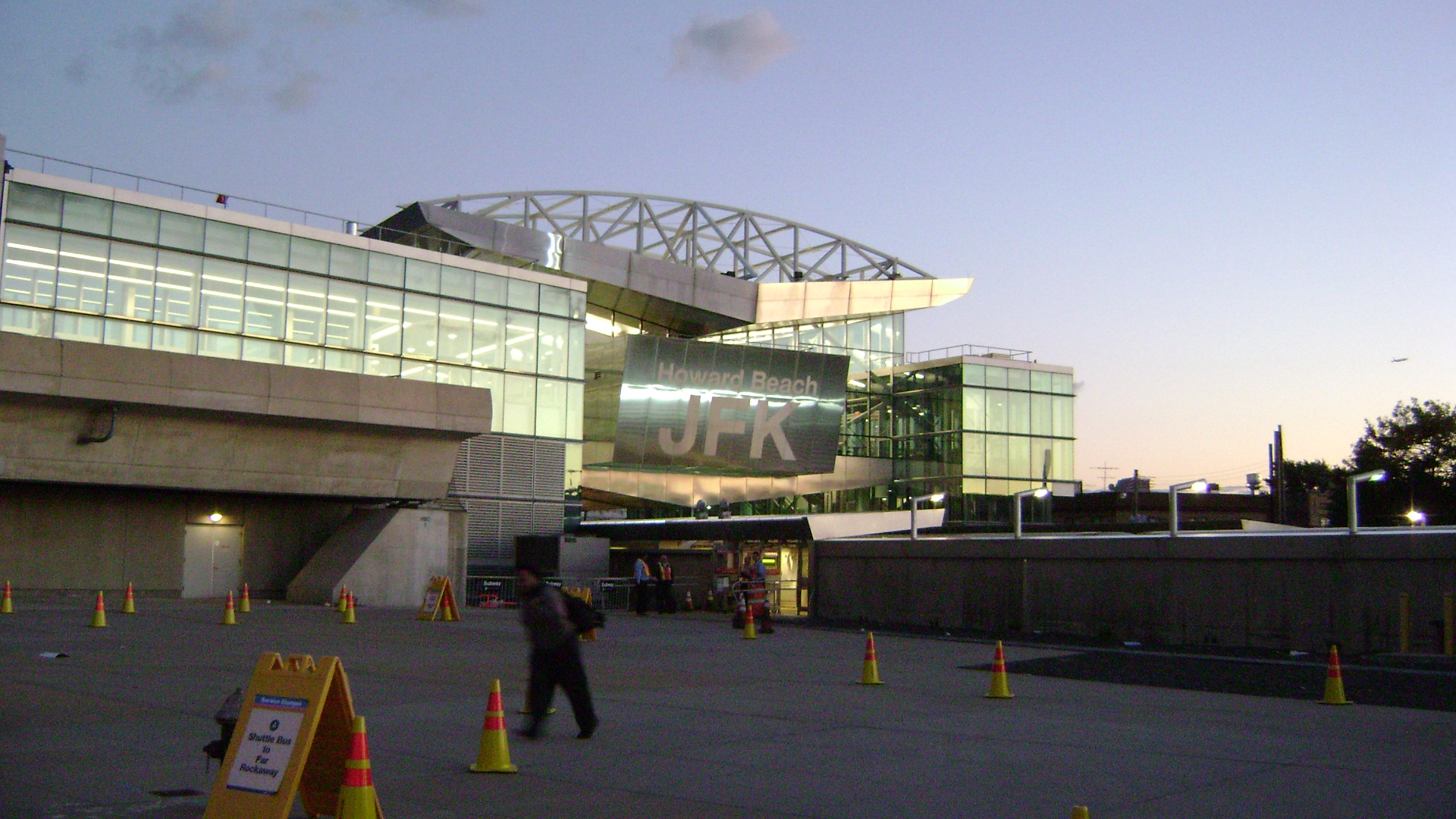
The building housing the AirTrain platforms as seen from the outside of the station

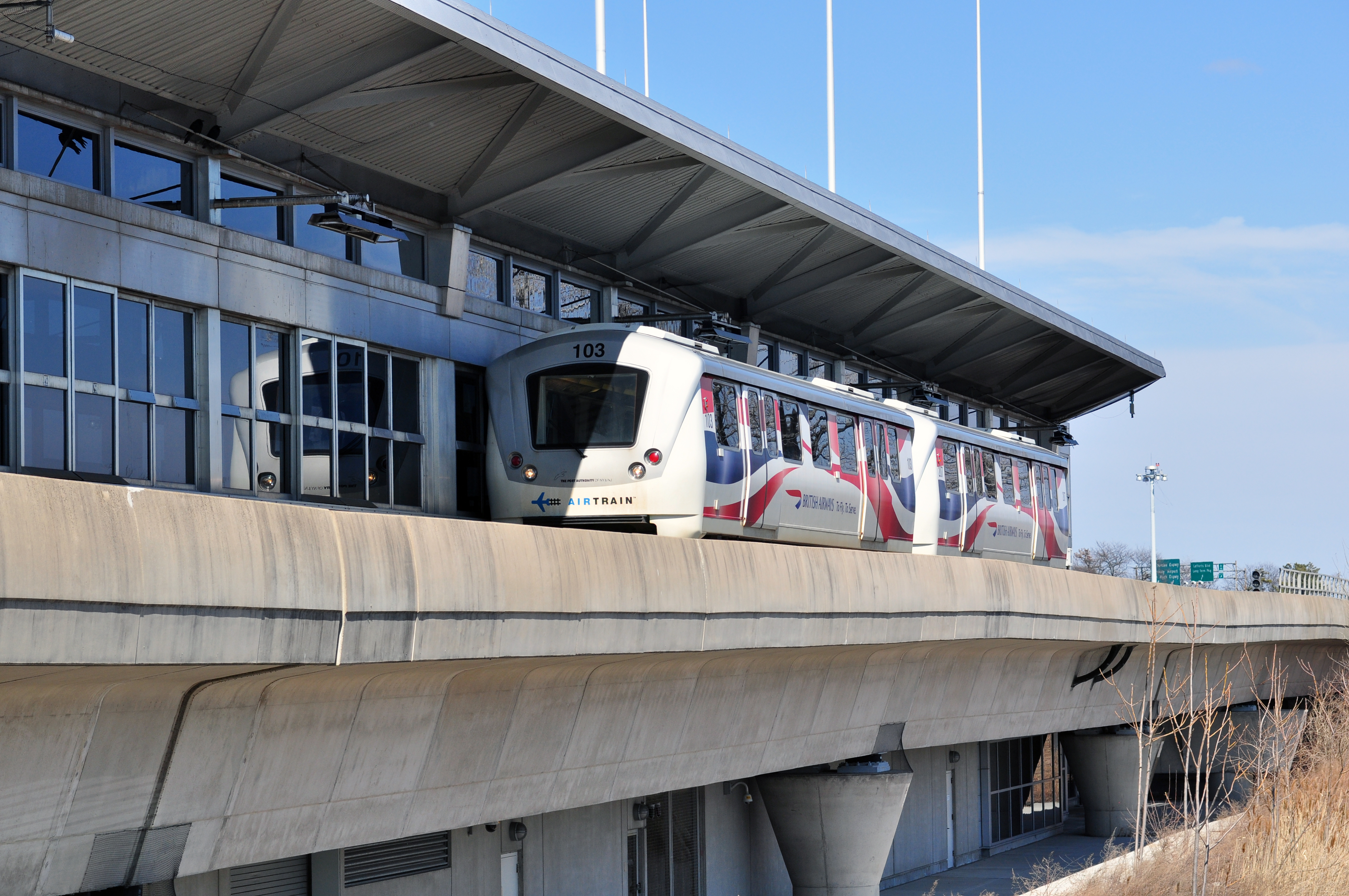
JFK AirTrain arriving at the station

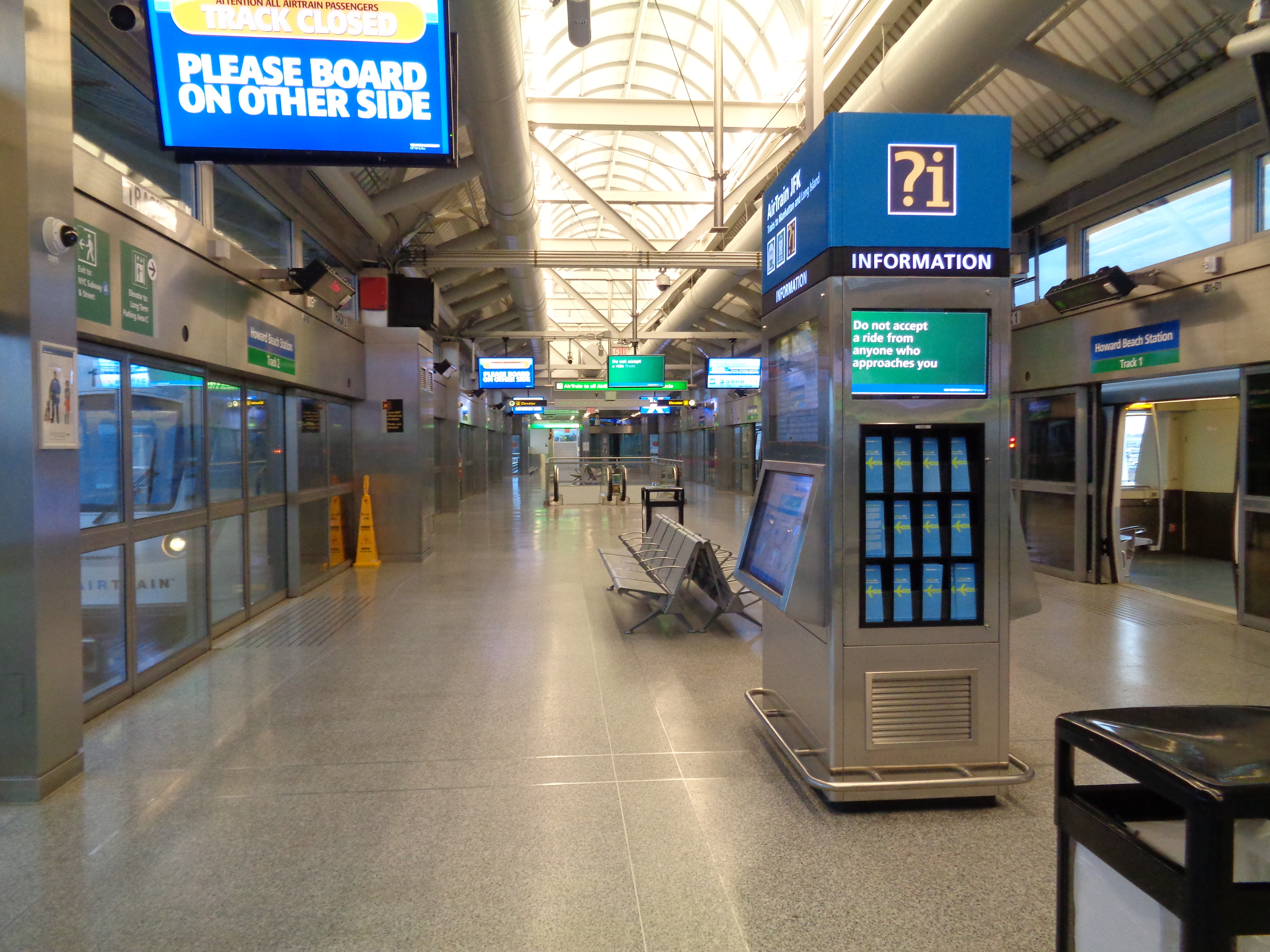
Interior of the AirTrain station

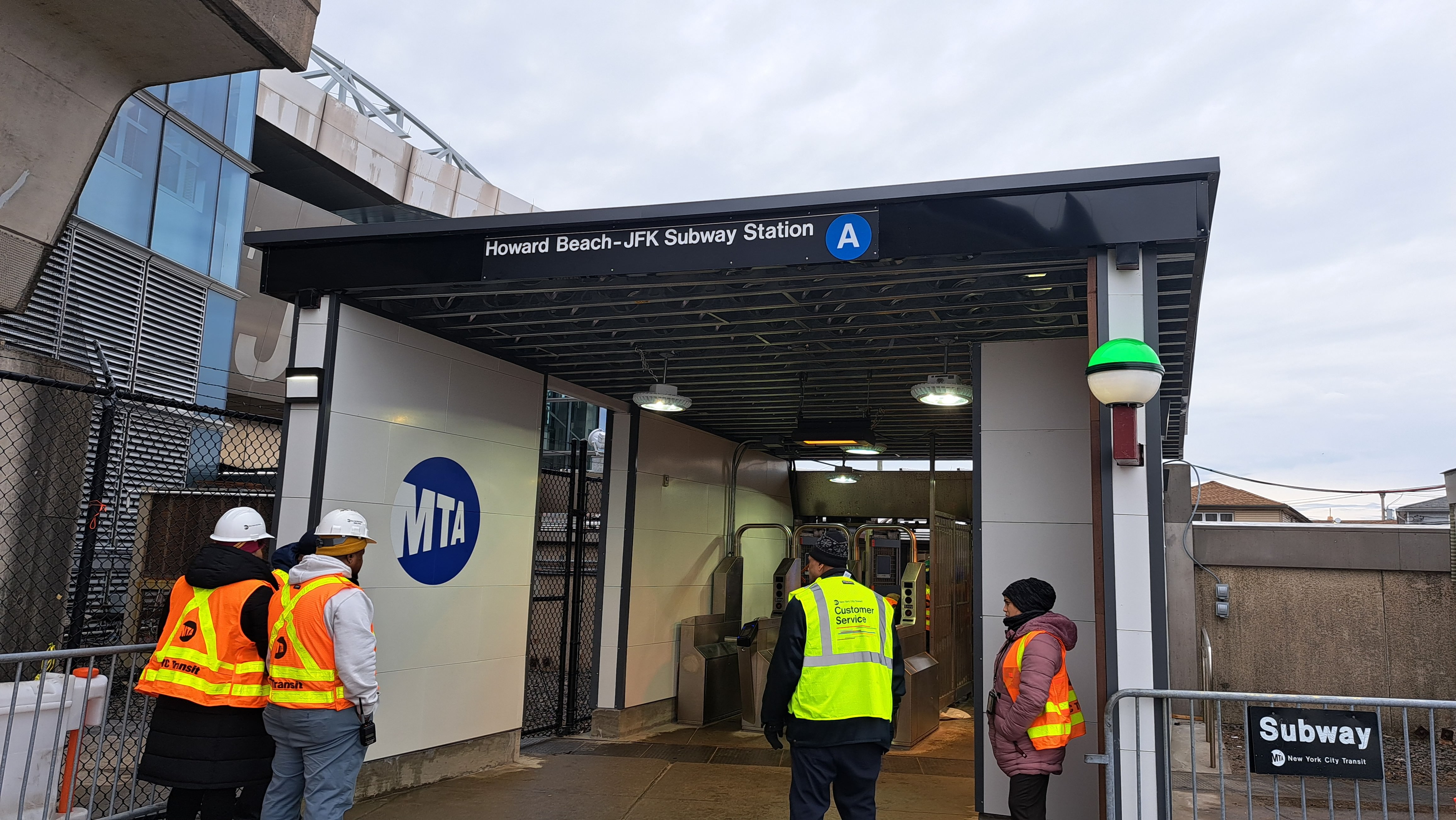
New Howard Beach–JFK Airport entrance which opened for the Rockaway Rehabilitation Project in 2025

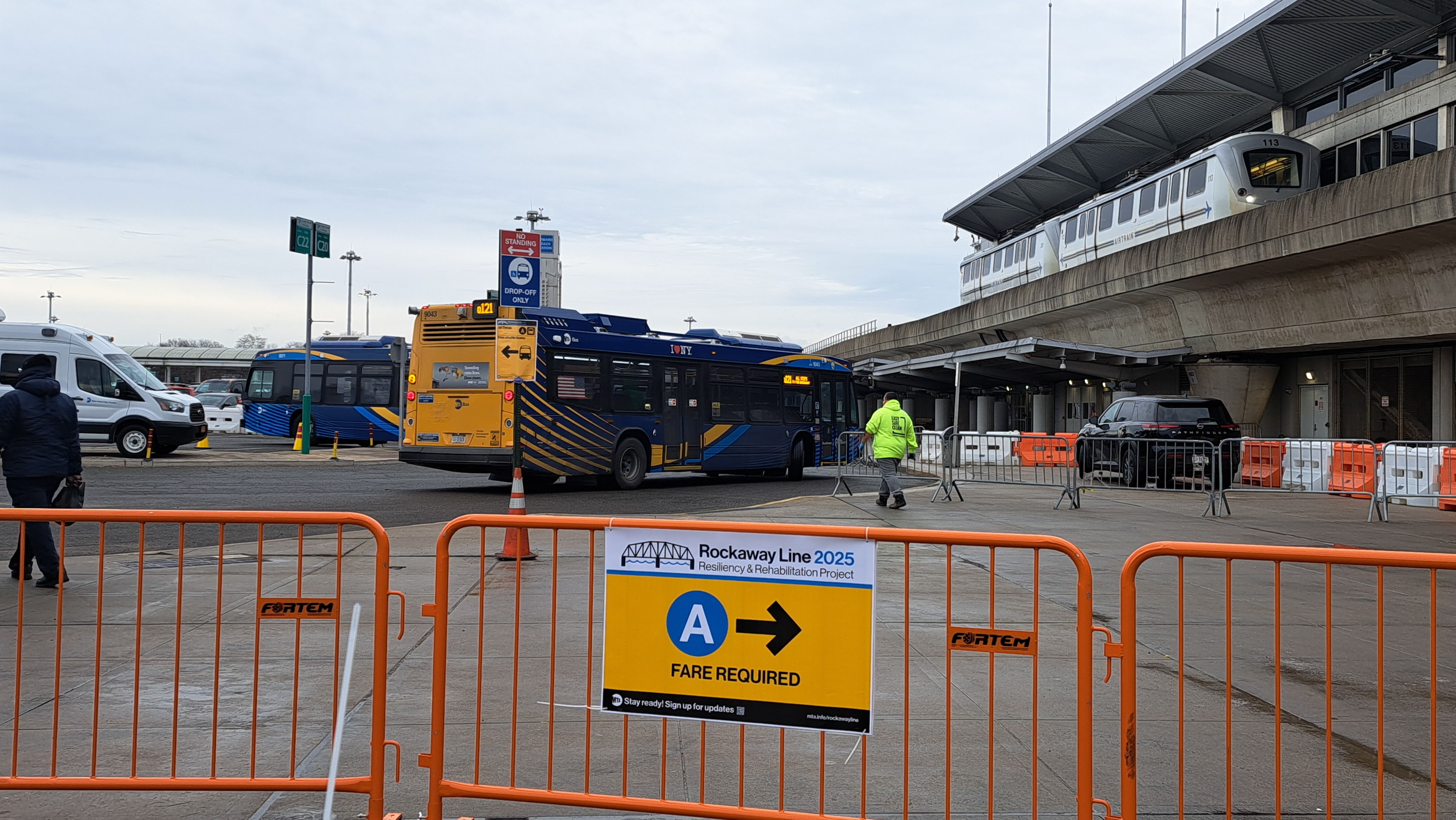
A Q121 A train shuttle bus dropping off people at the Howard Beach–JFK Airport station in 2025
