= Goose Creek station =

Train station in New York City (1888–1935)

Goose Creek
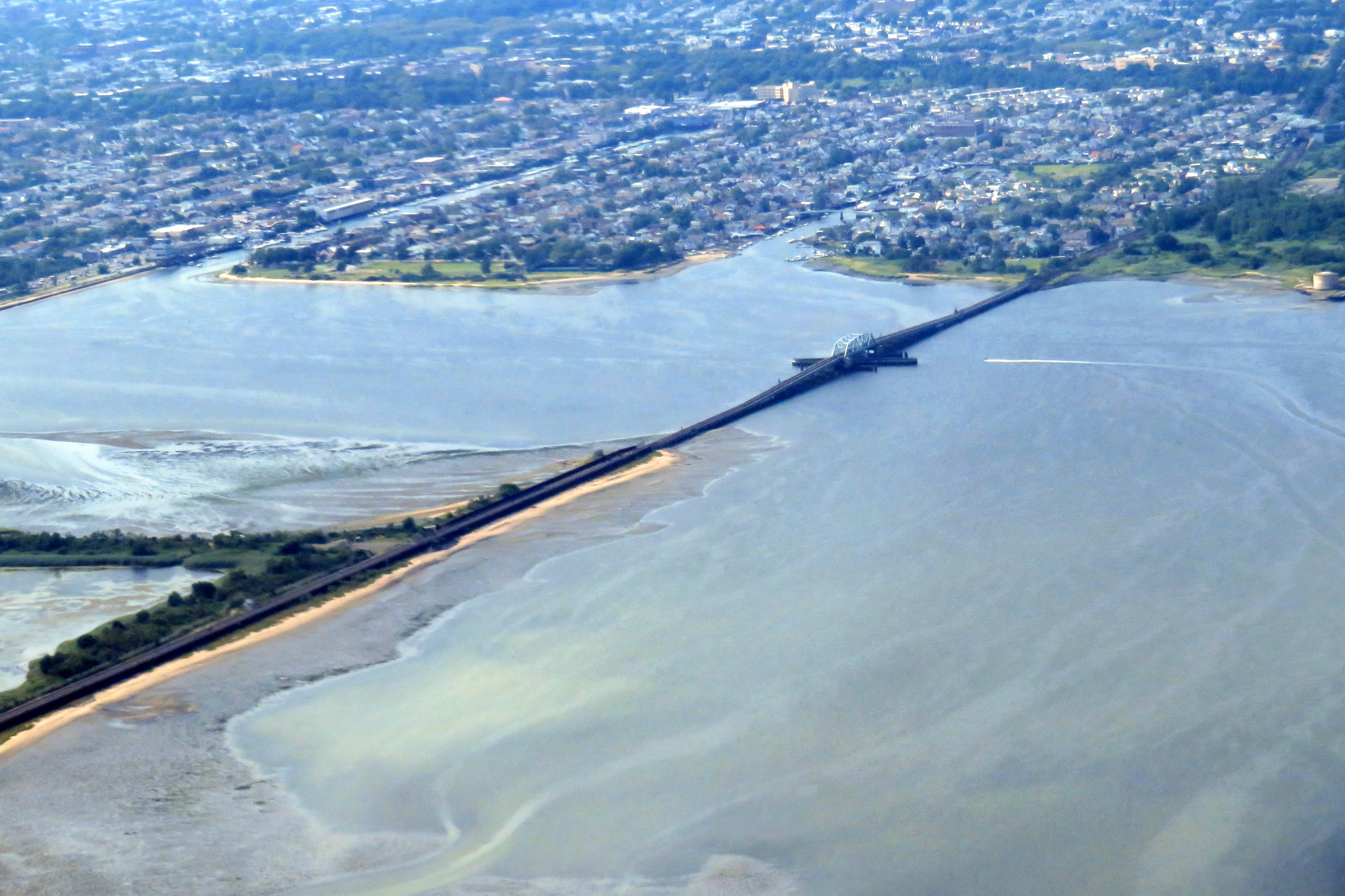
- Aerial view of North Channel Bridge in 2019. The former Goose Creek station was located near the causeway at the left edge of the photo.

General information
- Location: Jamaica Bay; Queens, New York, US
- Coordinates: 40°37′58.4″N 73°49′20.5″W
- Line: Rockaway Beach Branch
- Platforms: 2 side platforms
- Tracks: 2

History
- Opened: 1888
- Closed: 1935
- Electrified: July 26, 1905

Former services
Preceding station	Long Island Rail Road	Following station
Hamilton Beach toward Howard	Rockaway Beach Division	The Raunt toward Gibson or Rockaway Park
Preceding station	Brooklyn Rapid Transit	Following station
Hamilton Beach toward Chambers Street	Union Elevated Broadway Line 1898–1917	The Raunt toward Rockaway Park
Ramblersville toward Park Row	Union Elevated Fifth Avenue Line 1899–1905	The Raunt toward Rockaway Park
Location

Goose Creek was a Long Island Rail Road station on the Rockaway Beach Branch in the middle of Jamaica Bay in Queens, New York City, United States. A station was established at the site in 1888 to serve a settlement that developed along the railroad trestle. Goose Creek became a popular destination for anglers, with fishing clubs, hotels, and boat rental businesses. The station closed in 1935 and the settlement's buildings had disappeared by 1940. Today, the IND Rockaway Line follows the former railroad right-of-way on an embankment that replaced much of the original trestle.

== History ==
In August 1880, the New York, Woodhaven and Rockaway Railroad opened a double-track trestle across Jamaica Bay, enabling train service to Rockaway Beach, Queens, from Brooklyn and Long Island City. (Note: Trains to Flatbush Avenue depot in Brooklyn operated using trackage rights on the Long Island Rail Road (LIRR) Atlantic Branch via Woodhaven Junction. Trains to Long Island City station operated using trackage rights on the LIRR Lower Montauk Branch via Glendale Junction.) Trains initially stopped along the trestle to let off anglers at various locations where fishermen and squatters had established settlements, where they rented out boats and fishing equipment and sold bait and other supplies. In 1888, the New York and Rockaway Beach Railway leased both sides of its right-of-way at Goose Creek to Phillip Schappert on the condition that he build a station with a waiting room and a platform on both sides. The lease also called for the provision of a hotel and a fishing station. (Note: The New York, Woodhaven and Rockaway Railroad was taken over by the LIRR in 1887 and incorporated as the New York and Rockaway Beach Railway Company.) The railroad station at Goose Creek opened in the summer of 1888, first appearing in the timetable of July of that same year. (Note: Baer's chronology of the Pennsylvania Railroad Company lists Goose Creek among the stations in operation when the New York, Woodhaven and Rockaway Railroad opened in August 1880. This conflicts with sources that identify the summer of 1888 as the beginning of station service at Goose Creek. The discrepancy may reflect a distinction between an informal stopping place for anglers and a formally established station, although the available sources do not conclusively establish that explanation.) The station was located at the north end of the portion of the trestle across Goose Creek. (Note: The waterway located to the west of the trestle, which ran between Black Bank Marsh and Rulers Bar Hassock, was known as Goose Hill Channel.)

Goose Creek station was a popular destination for weakfish anglers, as it was in close proximity to well-known fishing grounds for weakfish including Big Paul, Deep Kills, Hell Gate, Rogers' Drain and The Pot. An 1895 article in The Sun described the fishing settlements along the trestle, particularly the one at Goose Creek. (Note: A nearly identical version of the description appeared in the Brooklyn Eagle in 1922.) According to the newspaper account, Goose Creek was "really nothing beyond a broadening out of the trestle" and had a platform about 6 or 7 feet (1.8 or 2.1 m) wide running along each side of the tracks. One side of the trestle contained a two-and-a-half-story hotel, while the other side contained about six small wooden buildings, most of which were fishing clubs, connected by a narrow boardwalk. All of the structures were built on piles about 9 or 10 feet (2.7 or 3.0 m) above Jamaica Bay. At the time, many of the visitors to Goose Creek were Germans living in Manhattan and Brooklyn, and they referred to the location as "Gansebach". (Note: The 1895 newspaper account reports that German visitors used the name "Gansebach" for the settlement. Gansebach is a German-derived name roughly meaning "Goose Creek". "Gans" corresponds with the German word for goose and "bach" corresponds with the German word for brook or stream.)

On the night of June 12, 1899, two northbound trains collided at Goose Creek station in dense fog when a special train carrying guests returning from a wedding at Far Rockaway struck the rear of a regular train that had just left the station. Six people were reported injured, none seriously. Because the accident occurred on the railway trestle across Jamaica Bay, the wreck could be reached only by train. Hospital and wrecking trains were dispatched after news of the accident reached Long Island City.

Structures built on piles at Goose Creek in Jamaica Bay, including two signs reading "White House". (Note: The White House was also known as Joe Paul's Hotel.)

By 1899, the settlement at Goose Creek consisted of six fishing clubs, two saloons, and a hotel. Boats and guides were also available for hire. According to a 1903 article in the New-York Tribune that described the development of Jamaica Bay as a modern-day version of Venice—with channels serving as the primary form of transportation within the bay—Goose Creek had "more boats to let than any other canal". A 1904 article in the Brooklyn Eagle noted that most of the fishing clubs were designed for summer occupancy, but some were being occupied by their members year-round.

The Rockaway Beach Branch was electrified on July 26, 1905. The following year, spoils from the construction of the tunnels leading to Pennsylvania Station were used by the Long Island Rail Road (LIRR) as fill beneath portions of the trestle across Goose Creek, reducing the need to maintain the elevated wooden structure. Between 1918 and 1921, Goose Creek station saw an average of 12 to 20 daily commuters; these included local businessmen who used rowboats to get between their cottages and the train station.

Goose Creek began to decline in the 1920s due to a combination of factors. The opening of Cross Bay Boulevard across Jamaica Bay in the 1920s reduced Goose Creek's isolation, as the settlement became connected to the new vehicular roadway by a footbridge. The boulevard also altered the settlement's relationship with the surrounding waterways. Resident Theodore Kreske attributed changes in tidal flows and water levels near Goose Creek to the boulevard's construction, claiming that boats could approach the settlement only at high tide. Local historian Emil Lucev attributed the loss of Jamaica Bay's formerly productive fishing grounds to dredging for deeper channels and landfill around the bay. Prohibition was also a factor cited in accounts of the settlement's decline. Lucev noted that the settlements on stilts in the bay became a popular location for rum-running during Prohibition. The settlement reportedly contained 38 structures by 1925. A 1928 newspaper account described Goose Creek as a settlement that had once included three hotels but was then largely deserted, with its buildings and docks falling into disrepair. Goose Creek station closed in September 1935. By 1940, all of the settlement's buildings had disappeared, leaving only the stumps of the piles that had supported them.

In 1950, the LIRR abandoned the trestle after a fire destroyed a large portion of the structure. The New York City Transit Authority acquired the former railroad line in 1953 for the extension of the New York City Subway to the Rockaways. The conversion involved constructing a 10,400-foot-long (3,200 m) embankment between Goose Creek Marsh and Broad Channel to replace the wooden trestle, which was costly to maintain and posed a fire risk. (Note: The waterway located on the north side of this embankment, which runs between the former Goose Creek Marsh and Hamilton Beach, is spanned by the North Channel Bridge.) The IND Rockaway Line opened in 1956.
