= Brooklyn Manor station =

Train station in New York City (1911–62)

Brooklyn Manor
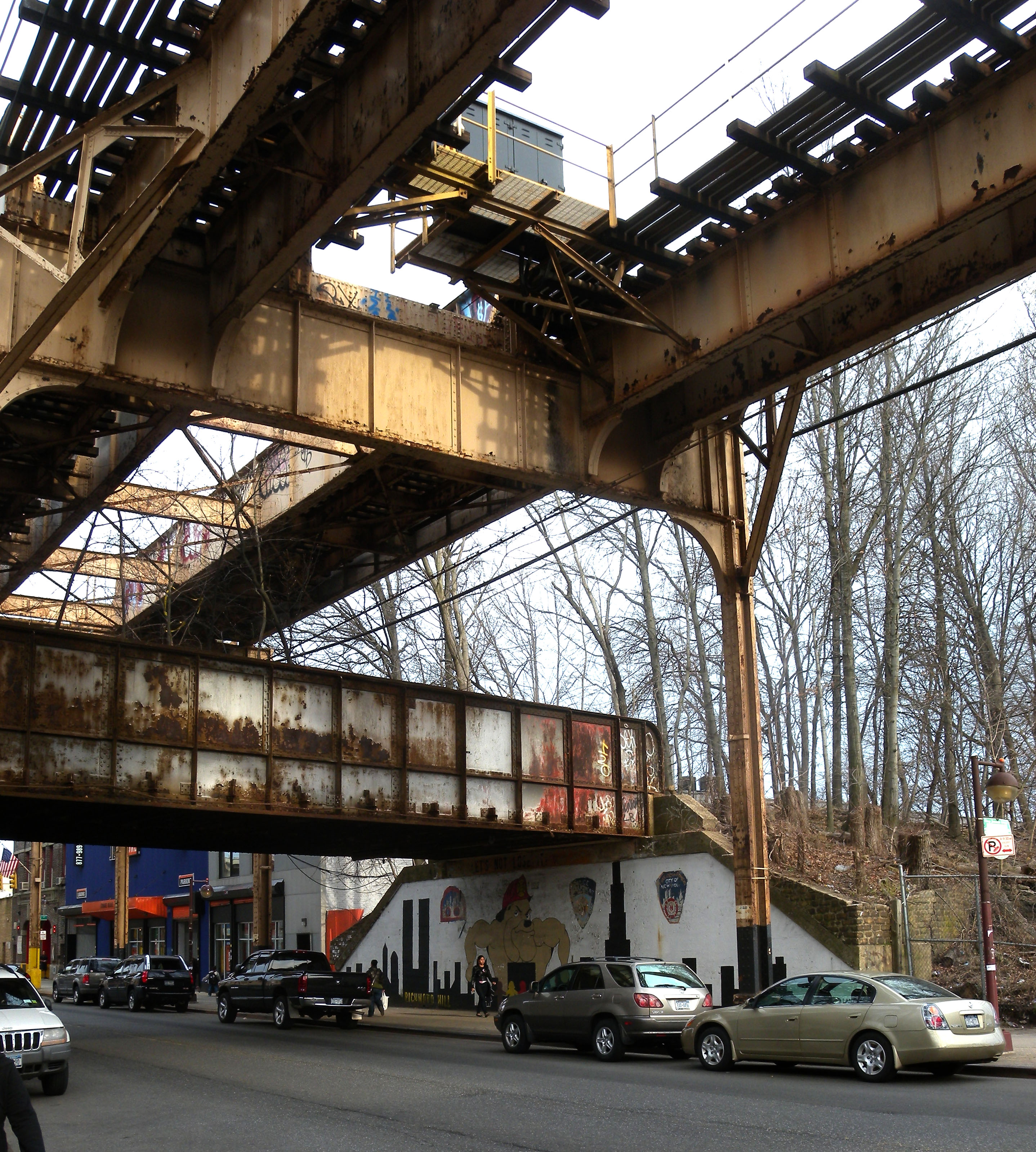
- Former Brooklyn Manor station site beneath the BMT Jamaica Line

General information
- Location: Jamaica Avenue between 98th and 101st Streets; Richmond Hill, Queens, New York
- Coordinates: 40.6949°N 73.8472°W
- Owner: City of New York
- Line: Rockaway Beach Branch
- Platforms: 2 side platforms
- Tracks: 2
- Connections: New York City Subway: 104th Street

Other information
- Fare zone: 1

History
- Opened: January 9, 1911
- Closed: June 8, 1962
- Electrified: 1905

Former services
Preceding station	Long Island Rail Road	Following station
Parkside toward Woodside	Rockaway Beach Division	Woodhaven Junction toward Gibson or Rockaway Park
Grand Street (before 1925) Terminus	Rockaway Beach Division	Woodhaven Junction toward Gibson or Rockaway Park
Location

The Brooklyn Manor station was a station on the Long Island Rail Road's Rockaway Beach Branch located on the south side of Jamaica Avenue at 100th Street, straddling the border between Richmond Hill and Woodhaven in Queens, New York City. The station name referred to the nearby Brooklyn Manor section of Woodhaven, originally a 603-lot development bounded by Woodhaven Boulevard to the west, 96th/98th Streets to the east, Forest Park to the north, and Jamaica Avenue to the south. The station opened in January 1911, and was constructed as a replacement for the Brooklyn Hills station, which was located 3,000 feet (910 m) to the north. This station closed along with the rest of the Rockaway Beach Branch in 1962, and was subsequently demolished.

== Station layout ==
3F	BMT Jamaica Line ( trains)
2F; Former platform level	Side platform, demolished
2F; Former platform level	Northbound	Trackbed
2F; Former platform level	Southbound	Trackbed
2F; Former platform level	Side platform, demolished
G	Street level	—

The elevated station was located on the south side of the overpass over Jamaica Avenue, with two side platforms and shelters on both platforms. The platforms at this station, like the others on the line, were constructed from wood. While most of the other stations on the line south of here were rebuilt in the 1930s and 1940s with concrete platforms, the platforms at this station were not replaced. The BMT Jamaica Line runs over the Rockaway Beach Branch tracks along Jamaica Avenue. This section of the Jamaica Line opened in 1917, built after the Long Island Rail Road (LIRR) station. Connection was available to the Jamaica Avenue surface trolley, and to the Jamaica Line two blocks east at the 102nd–104th Streets station.

== History ==
A new station along the Rockaway Beach Branch at Jamaica Avenue was proposed in 1909 by the LIRR. In April 1910, the LIRR applied to the New York Public Service Commission (PSC) for permission to discontinue service at the Brooklyn Hills station, which was built in 1882, and relocate it 3,000 feet (910 m) to the south of the station side at Myrtle Avenue in Forest Park. The PSC granted the LIRR's application on May 20, 1910, on the condition that the LIRR submit plans for the new station to the PSC for approval, which it did on September 29, 1911.

The station was built in conjunction with other projects along the line, including the elimination of grade crossings, its electrification, and its extension from the Glendale Junction with the Montauk Branch to the LIRR Main Line at Whitepot Junction, known as the Glendale Cut-off. The new station opened on January 9, 1911, and was only served by electric trains, because the platforms could not accommodate the steam trains to Long Island City. Service was initially provided by six trains to Penn Station, and by eleven trains to Far Rockaway. Following the opening of Brooklyn Manor, passengers were diverted away from the Atlantic Branch, leading to increased service to Penn Station.

In the early expansion plans of the city's Independent Subway System (IND) in the 1930s, the Rockaway Beach Branch was planned to be absorbed into the new subway, which would have turned the Brooklyn Manor station into a stop on the IND Queens Boulevard Line or a new Queens crosstown line. In 1950, the Rockaway Beach Branch south of Ozone Park closed after the trestle across Jamaica Bay between The Raunt and Broad Channel stations was destroyed by a fire. The city purchased the entire line in 1955, but only the portion south of Liberty Avenue was reactivated for subway service. Ridership declined on the remaining portion of the branch. Vandalism and criminal activity along the line also led the LIRR to take the two side platforms out of service in 1958, replacing these with a low-level platform in the former southbound trackway. The station closed on June 8, 1962, along with the rest of the Rockaway Beach Branch.

== Current status ==
In the 1950s, following the fire that led to service reductions on the line, the QM23 express bus was created by Green Bus Lines to replace LIRR service between this station and Manhattan. After takeover by the Metropolitan Transportation Authority (MTA) in 2006, the route was discontinued on June 27, 2010, due to budget cuts. Alternate service is provided by the nearby 104th Street subway station on the Jamaica Line.

While few remnants of the station site remain, there still is dilapidated track and signal infrastructure. Signal towers can still be seen on the path to Brooklyn Manor. Much of the roadbed is overgrown with trees and weeds. Access to the area is currently limited, although Queens Community Board 9 has proposed to redevelop the right-of-way into a greenway bike path.
