= Ozone Park station =

Ozone Park station may refer to:

- Ozone Park station (LIRR)
- Ozone Park–Lefferts Boulevard (IND Fulton Street Line)
