= Woodhaven station =

Train station in New York City (1848–1939)

Woodhaven

General information
- Location: Atlantic Avenue near 87th Street; Woodhaven, Queens, New York
- Coordinates: 40.6855°N 73.857°W
- Owner: Long Island Rail Road
- Line: Atlantic Branch
- Platforms: 2 side platforms
- Tracks: 2

Other information
- Station code: None
- Fare zone: 1

History
- Opened: 1848
- Closed: 1939
- Electrified: 1905
- Former names: Woodville

Former services
Preceding station	Long Island Rail Road	Following station
East New York toward Flatbush Avenue	Atlantic Division	Woodhaven Junction toward Valley Stream
Preceding station	Brooklyn Rapid Transit	Following station
Howard House toward Park Row	Union Elevated Fifth Avenue Line 1899–1905	Woodhaven Junction toward Rockaway Park
Location

Woodhaven is a former railroad and trolley station on the Atlantic Branch of the Long Island Rail Road. Though it was also on one of the same lines as Woodhaven Junction station the two stations were distinguished from one another. Woodhaven was located on Atlantic Avenue, east of 87th Street.

== History ==
Woodhaven station was a replacement for another station further to the east known as "Trotting Course Lane," which itself originally opened as Connecticut Avenue Station on July 31, 1837, by the Brooklyn and Jamaica Railroad at 94th Street. The name was changed to "Trotting Course Station," and then "Trotting Course Lane Station" for service to horse racing fans at the 1825-built Centerville Race Course. Trotting Course Lane station closed in 1842. Very little evidence of the existence of the street near the tracks, let alone the station can be found today.

Six years later, a new station would be built west of Trotting Course Lane. Originally known as Woodville station, it was built in 1848. Sometime in or around 1859 the station was renamed Woodhaven, although the community itself was given that name on August 1, 1853, in order to distinguish itself from another community with the same name in the Finger Lakes Region. The station was re-opened as an Atlantic Avenue Rapid Transit station on April 28, 1905 with the electrification from Flatbush Avenue. In 1911 the platforms were widened. With the sinking of the Atlantic Branch into a tunnel, the station closed on November 1, 1939. The name would be revived again for Woodhaven Junction when the Rockaway Beach Branch was abandoned on June 9, 1962, until that station too was abandoned in 1976.
