= Hamilton Beach station =

Train station in New York City (1919–55)

Hamilton Beach
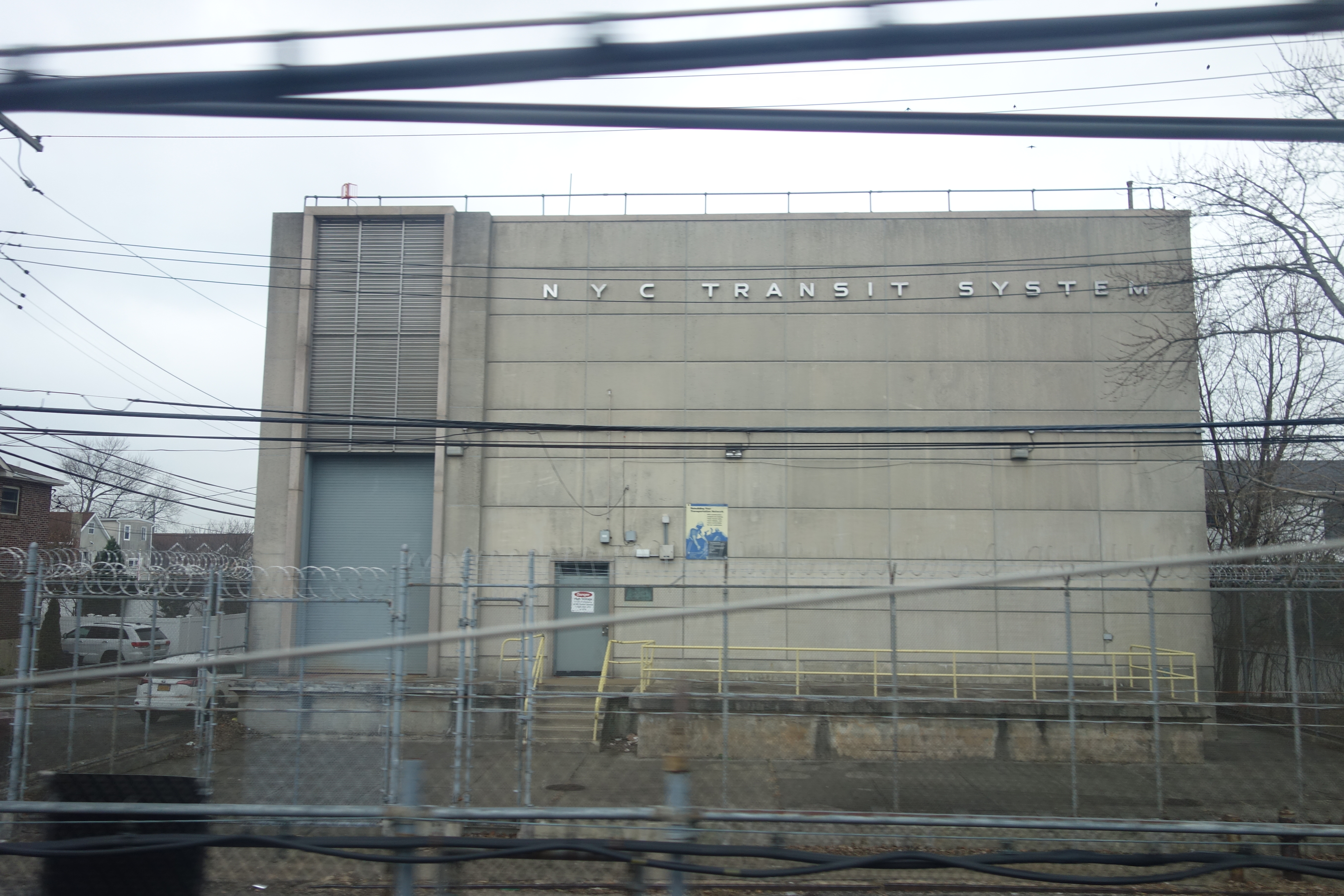
- The Hamilton Beach Substation of the IND Rockaway Line, at the approximate site of the station.

General information
- Location: 104th Street; Hamilton Beach, Queens, New York
- Coordinates: 40°39′5.65″N 73°49′38.05″W
- Line: Rockaway Beach Branch
- Platforms: 2 side platforms
- Tracks: 4

Other information
- Fare zone: 1

History
- Opened: October 1919
- Closed: October 2, 1955
- Electrified: July 26, 1905

Former services
Preceding station	Long Island Rail Road	Following station
Howard Beach toward Woodside	Rockaway Beach Division	Howard toward Gibson or Rockaway Park
Location

Hamilton Beach was a former Long Island Rail Road station on the Rockaway Beach Branch in Queens, New York City. It was located between two streets in Hamilton Beach, Queens, one of which no longer exists and is part of land owned by JFK Airport.

== History ==
Hamilton Beach station was originally built in 1919 by the Long Island Rail Road nearly 12 years after the disastrous fire that destroyed the Howard's Landing station and the hotel that it served. It also served as a replacement for Ramblersville, which was eventually renamed Howard Beach station. Throughout its existence, the station was never anything more than two sheltered shacks along both platforms. It was the southernmost station having four tracks of the Rockaway Beach Branch, which narrowed down to two tracks at the "WD Tower" (later "BEACH Tower") and crossed Jamaica Bay.

Farther south in Jamaica Bay, a fire destroyed the line at The Raunt on May 7–8, 1950, transforming Hamilton Beach into the terminus of the legitimate Rockaway Beach Branch. Trains that actually went to the line's namesake followed the rest of the Atlantic Branch onto the Far Rockaway Branch, where it merged at Hammels Wye. The Rockaway Beach Branch was sold to the New York City Transit Authority in 1952, and Hamilton Beach station closed on October 2, along with nearby Howard Beach station. Most stations on the line south of Ozone Park closed on October 3, 1955, before being reopened as subway stations along the IND Rockaway Line on June 28, 1956. Hamilton Beach station was not one of them.
