= Woodhaven Junction station =

Train station in New York City (1881–1977)

Woodhaven Junction
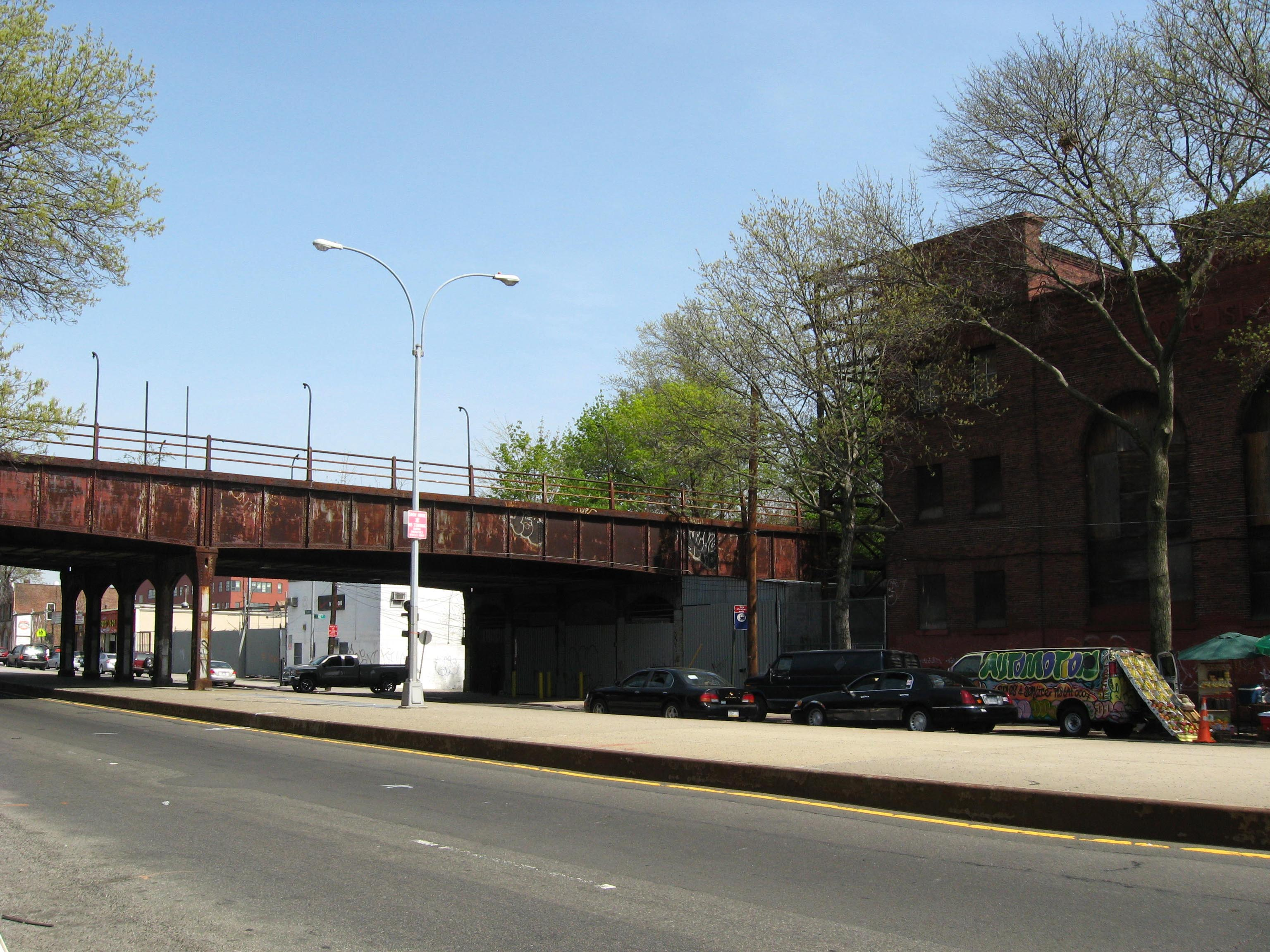
- Former Woodhaven Junction station site

General information
- Location: Atlantic Avenue and 100th Street; Woodhaven, Queens, New York
- Coordinates: 40°41′22″N 73°50′39.6″W
- Owner: Long Island Rail Road
- Lines: Atlantic Branch and Rockaway Beach Branch
- Platforms: 4 side platforms (2 on each level)
- Tracks: 4 (2 on each level)

Other information
- Station code: None
- Fare zone: 1

History
- Opened: 1881 (Rockaway Beach, elevated); 1893/1895 (Atlantic, street-level)
- Closed: June 8, 1962 (Rockaway Beach, elevated); January 7, 1977 (Atlantic, underground)
- Rebuilt: December 28, 1942 (Atlantic, underground)
- Electrified: 1905

Former services
Preceding station	Long Island Rail Road	Following station
Woodhaven toward Atlantic Terminal	Atlantic Branch	Clarenceville toward Valley Stream
Preceding station	Long Island Rail Road	Following station
Brooklyn Manor toward Woodside	Rockaway Beach Division	Ozone Park toward Gibson or Rockaway Park
Brooklyn Hills (before 1911) toward Glendale	Rockaway Beach Division	Ozone Park toward Gibson or Rockaway Park
Preceding station	Brooklyn Rapid Transit	Following station
Norwood Avenue toward Chambers Street	Union Elevated Broadway Line 1898–1917	Ozone Park toward Rockaway Park
Woodhaven toward Park Row	Union Elevated Fifth Avenue Line 1899–1905	Ramblersville toward Rockaway Park
Location

Woodhaven Junction was a station complex on the Atlantic Branch and Rockaway Beach Branch of the Long Island Rail Road, located at Atlantic Avenue between 98th and 100th Streets in Woodhaven, Queens, New York City. The elevated Rockaway Beach station was closed in 1962 along with the rest of the branch, while the underground Atlantic Branch station was closed and abandoned on January 7, 1977.

== History ==
=== Early history ===
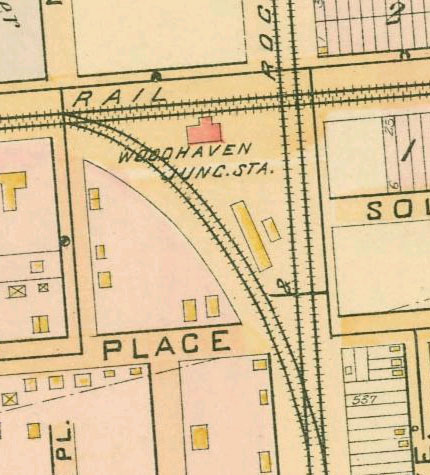
1891 map of the arrangement of Woodhaven Junction.

The station was first opened by the LIRR in the 1880s for the Rockaway Beach Branch (then known as the New York, Woodhaven and Rockaway Railroad), and in 1893 for the Atlantic Branch.

=== Renovation ===
Beginning in May 1940, both stations were rebuilt when the Atlantic Branch was grade separated and placed in a tunnel. The elevated Rockaway Beach station opened in September 1941, while the underground Atlantic Branch station opened for service on December 28, 1942.

=== Decline and closing ===
In the early expansion plans of the city's Independent Subway System in the 1930s, the Rockaway Beach Branch was planned to be absorbed into the new subway, which would have turned the Woodhaven elevated station into a stop on the IND Queens Boulevard Line or a new Queens crosstown line. In 1950, the Rockaway Beach Branch south of the Howard Beach station had closed after the trestle on Jamaica Bay between The Raunt and Broad Channel Stations was destroyed by a fire. The city purchased the entire line in 1955, but only the portion south of Liberty Avenue was reactivated for subway service.

Ridership declined on the remaining portion of the LIRR Rockaway Beach Branch, and fewer trains were scheduled to stop at Woodhaven on the Atlantic Branch. Passengers who would normally use the station had to ride buses to the next nearest stations. The elevated station of the Rockaway Beach Branch closed first on June 8, 1962, along with the rest of the Rockaway Beach Branch.

The underground station of the Atlantic Branch closed on January 7, 1977 due to vandalism and declining ridership. At the time, only two trains, one in each direction, stopped at Woodhaven. Most lights at the station had been broken by thrown beer bottles and rocks, and the walls were covered with graffiti and were filthy. LIRR President Robert Pattison said the station was a popular hangout spot for neighborhood vandals.

== Station layout ==
The Rockaway Beach Branch station, located on a trestle adjacent to 100th Street, was built with two concrete high-level side platforms, with staircases down to the street and the Atlantic Branch on either side of Atlantic Avenue. The underground Atlantic Branch station's design resembled an Independent Subway station, with tile work of the same design; the name mosaic reads "Woodhaven". A two-track connection between the branched curved from the Rockaway Beach Branch south of its station to merge with the Atlantic Branch west of its station at about 96th Street.

Woodhaven Junction is one of two stations on the abandoned Rockaway Beach Branch still standing (the other being Ozone Park), while the underground Atlantic Branch station is still visible from passing trains. The now-abandoned LIRR substation is present on the south side of Atlantic Avenue west of the elevated line. The northern staircases to the elevated station are still visible. The former track junction and part of the Rockaway Branch right-of-way south to 97th Avenue has been paved over and is used as a school bus depot for the Logan Bus Company; the ramp and tunnel portal of the connection have been filled in.

== QueensLink ==
The station has been proposed to be reopened as part of the QueensLink program. The elevated platforms on the upper level would serve the rerouted M train while the underground platforms at the lower level would serve LIRR trains on the Atlantic Branch. The reopened station would be fully accessible with entrance provided on Atlantic Avenue.

In addition to the reopening of the station, the QueensLink proposal includes a plan to convert the triangular piece of land between the Rockaway Beach Branch and Atlantic Avenue into a park. The triangular plot was formerly part of the connection between the two branches of the Woodhaven Junction. A number of bike paths have also been proposed to improve connectivity of the station.
