= Brooklyn Hills station =

Train station in New York City (1882–1911)

Brooklyn Hills
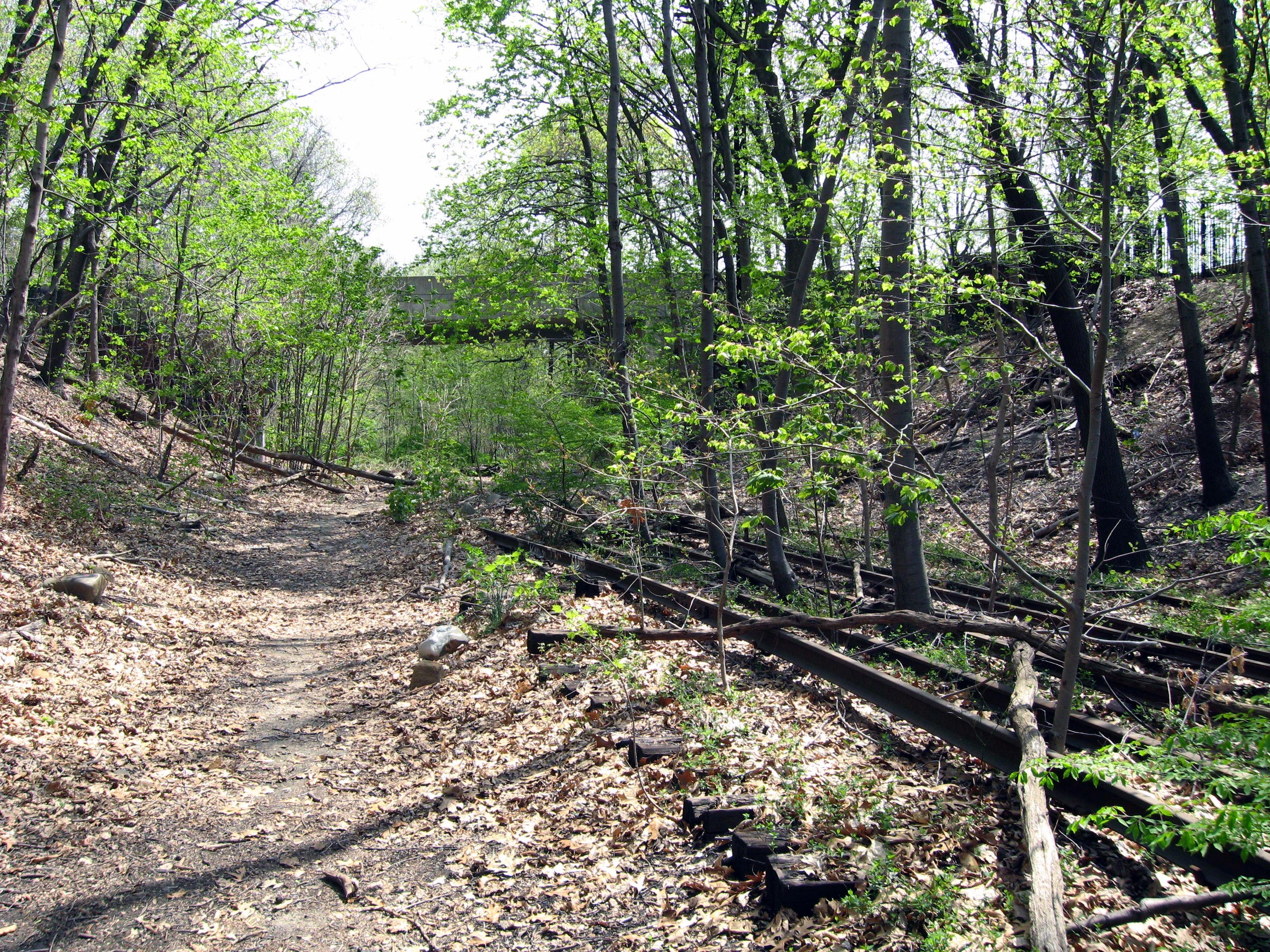
- Site of former Brooklyn Hills station

General information
- Location: Myrtle Avenue; Forest Park, Queens, New York
- Coordinates: 40°42′08.3″N 73°51′09.1″W
- Owner: NYC Parks Department
- Line: Rockaway Beach Branch
- Platforms: 2 side platforms
- Tracks: 2

History
- Opened: 1882
- Closed: 1911
- Electrified: 1905

Former services
Preceding station	Long Island Rail Road	Following station
Glendale Terminus	Rockaway Beach Division	Woodhaven Junction toward Gibson or Rockaway Park
Location

Brooklyn Hills is a former Long Island Rail Road station, located at Myrtle Avenue in Forest Park, Queens, New York City, near Glendale, Queens. Opened in 1882, the station was part of the now-defunct Rockaway Beach Branch to the Rockaway Peninsula; during most of its time in operation, trains to the station originated from the Montauk Branch. The station was closed in 1911, replaced with the nearby Brooklyn Manor station at Jamaica Avenue. The entire line ceased operations on June 8, 1962.

== History ==
Opened in 1882 by the New York, Woodhaven and Rockaway Railroad (former operators of the branch), Brooklyn Hills was one of the oldest stations on the line. Until 1910, it was the northernmost station on the Rockaway Beach Branch. Trains continued north and west along the Montauk Branch towards Long Island City, connecting with a ferry to Manhattan. On June 16, 1910, the electrified Glendale Cut-off extended the line north from the Glendale Junction with the Montauk Division to Whitepot Junction at Rego Park on the Main Line; Rockaway Beach trains could now run via the Main Line to Penn Station in Manhattan. The year before, it was proposed to relocate the station 3,000 feet to the south at Jamaica Avenue, due to the present station's location in the sparsely populated Forest Park area. Brooklyn Hills was demolished on January 9, 1911 and replaced by the larger Brooklyn Manor station. Brooklyn Hills station was the first station on the line to close.
