= Howard station (LIRR) =

Train station in New York City (1898–1907)

Coordinates: 40.647°N 73.828°W

Howard
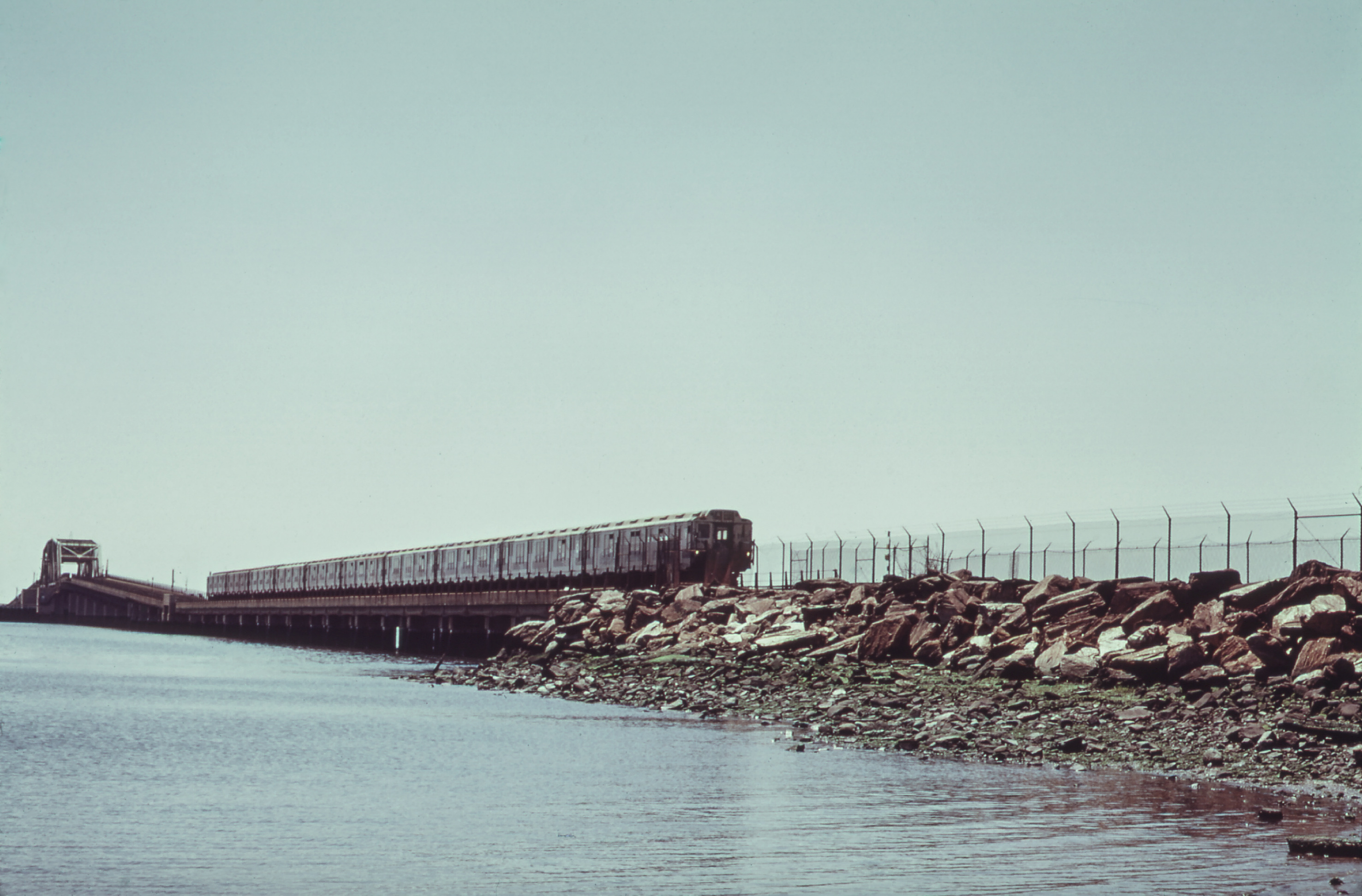
- A subway train near the former station site in 1973

General information
- Location: Hawtree Creek; Howard Beach, Queens, New York
- Line: Rockaway Beach Branch
- Platforms: 2 side platforms (1 added later)
- Tracks: 2

History
- Opened: 1898
- Closed: 1907
- Electrified: July 26, 1905

Former services
Preceding station	Long Island Rail Road	Following station
Hamilton Beach toward Glendale	Rockaway Beach Division	Goose Creek toward Gibson or Rockaway Park
Location

Howard (also Howard's Landing) was a former Long Island Rail Road station on the Rockaway Beach Branch. Located on marshland along the coast of Jamaica Bay south of the "WD Tower" near Hawtree Creek, it had no fixed address, and was south of what is today 165th Avenue, evidently within the Gateway National Recreation Area's Hamilton Beach Park.

== History ==
Howard station was originally built in 1898 by the New York and Rockaway Beach Railroad for a hotel and resort built by William H. Howard. The station contained a single plank walk platform over the water along the southbound tracks. Northbound train passengers had to step down into southbound track and walk through southbound cars before entering the hotel. The single platform was extended "several hundred feet" in April 1899, and was given a footpath almost a half-mile long in the Spring of 1900. This included a 34-foot drawbridge that was hand operated and blocked the mouth of Hawtree Creek, much to the dismay of many boaters and fisherman.

A woman who wasn't familiar with the arrangement of the platforms drowned in 1901, when she tried to step off a northbound train at night during high tide and was swept into Jamaica Bay. A northbound platform was added to the station in May 1902. On October 23, 1907, the entire resort including the station was destroyed in a fire. It was never rebuilt.
