= Rockaway Beach Branch =

Long Island Rail Road branch (closed 1962)

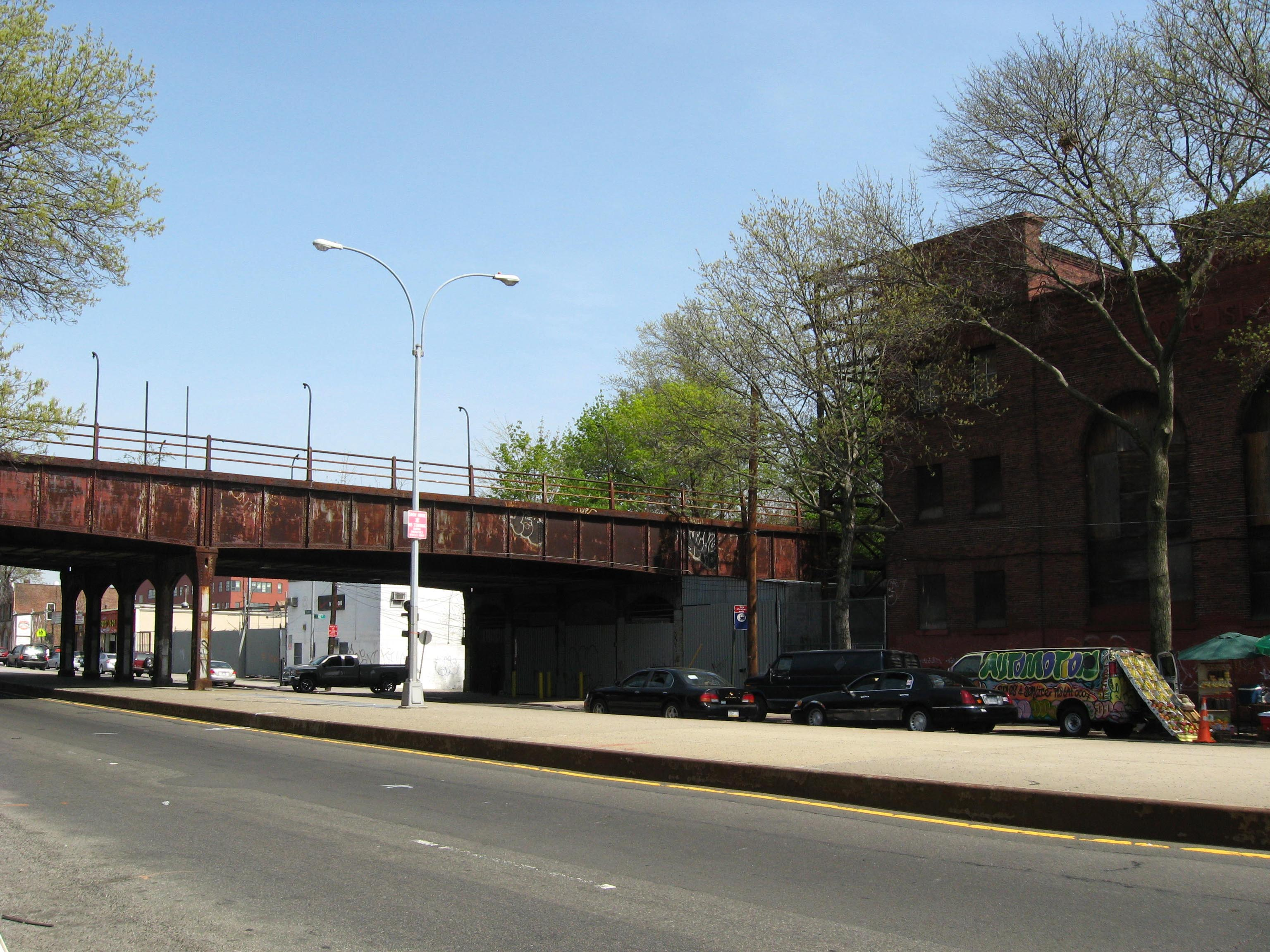
- Woodhaven Junction

Overview
- Status: Out of service (Rego Park–Liberty Avenue); In service as IND Rockaway Line (Liberty Avenue–Rockaway Peninsula)
- Owner: City of New York
- Locale: Queens, New York, United States
- Termini: Rego Park (north); Rockaway Park and Far Rockaway, Rockaway Peninsula (south)
- Stations: 19

Service
- Type: Passenger; freight (former); Rapid transit; disused (current)
- System: Long Island Rail Road
- Operator: Long Island Rail Road

History
- Opened: 1880 (LIRR); 1956 (subway; south of Liberty Avenue and Rockaway Boulevard)
- Closed: 1950 (Liberty Avenue–Rockaway Peninsula); 1962 (Liberty Avenue–Rego Park)

Technical
- Line length: 4.8 miles (7.7 km)
- Track gauge: 4 ft 8 1/2 in (1,435 mm) standard gauge
- Operating speed: ~35–45 mph (56–72 km/h)

The Rockaway Beach Branch was a rail line owned and operated by the Long Island Rail Road in Queens, New York City, United States. The line left the Main Line at Whitepot Junction in Rego Park heading south via Ozone Park and across Jamaica Bay to Hammels in the Rockaways, turning west there to a terminal at Rockaway Park. Along the way it connected with the Montauk Branch near Glendale, the Atlantic Branch near Woodhaven, and the Far Rockaway Branch at Hammels.

After a 1950 fire, the Jamaica Bay bridge was closed and the line south of Ozone Park sold to the city, which rehabilitated the portion south of Liberty Avenue and connected it to the New York City Subway system as the IND Rockaway Line. The portion north of the subway connection was closed in 1962, and two proposals exist for the reuse of the line.

== Operations ==
=== Early history ===
Map of the New York and Rockaway Beach Railroad

The New York, Woodhaven and Rockaway Railroad was incorporated on March 21, 1877 and organized on March 24 to build a 3 ft 6 in (1,067 mm) narrow gauge line from Greenpoint, Brooklyn (connecting with the New York and Manhattan Beach Railway) via Cypress Hills and Woodhaven to Rockaway Beach. This route was created in order to cut an hour off of travel times to the Rockaways. The new route would take 30 minutes, while the existing route to the Rockaway via the South Side Railroad would take an hour and a half. The plans were later changed (on March 13, 1878) to build a 4 ft 8 1/2 in (1,435 mm) standard gauge line from Hunter's Point rather than Greenpoint.

An agreement was made with the Long Island Rail Road in 1880 to operate over its Montauk Division to Bushwick and Hunter's Point (via trackage rights from Glendale Junction) and Atlantic Division to Flatbush Avenue (carried by LIRR locomotives from Woodhaven Junction). In order to support the extra traffic, the LIRR agreed to double-track the Montauk Division west of Richmond Hill and the Atlantic Division west of Woodhaven Junction.

After a delay caused by financial problems, the line opened on August 26, 1880, and the LIRR stopped running trains from its New York terminals to Rockaway Beach via Valley Stream and its Far Rockaway Branch. It continued to operate through trains to Far Rockaway, as well as trains between Long Beach and Rockaway Beach.

The company went bankrupt and was sold under foreclosure on July 30, 1887, to Austin Corbin, owner of the LIRR, who reorganized it as the New York and Rockaway Beach Railway (NY&RB) on August 19, 1887, and transferred the property on September 1, 1887. The old Far Rockaway Branch west of Arverne was soon connected to the NY&RB at Hammels, and was abandoned west of the new connection. The NY&RB began operating trains to Far Rockaway over this connection.

From 1898 to 1917, the Brooklyn Elevated Railroad (later Brooklyn Rapid Transit Company) operated trains from Williamsburg (later Lower Manhattan) to Rockaway Beach (at the western part of the Rockaway Peninsula), using a connection to the Atlantic Avenue Division at Chestnut Street Junction (in present-day East New York) and the Rockaway Beach Division south of Woodhaven Junction.

The NY&RB was operated independently until July 1, 1904, when the LIRR leased it as the Rockaway Beach Division. The line south of Woodhaven Junction was part of the LIRR's first electrification, along with the Atlantic Avenue Division west to Atlantic Terminal, with electric passenger service beginning July 26, 1905. Steam trains continued to serve Rockaway Park from Long Island City until June 16, 1910, when the electrified Glendale Cut-off opened, extending the line north from Glendale on the Montauk Division to White Pot Junction at Rego Park on the Main Line.

This extension also included another connecting track from the Montauk Branch west of Union Turnpike at Forest Park to Parkside Station. At the same time, the Rockaway Beach Division was electrified north of Woodhaven Junction, and the Main Line was electrified west of Rego Park (and into Penn Station when the East River Tunnels opened on September 8, 1910). The New York and Rockaway Beach Railway was merged into the LIRR on June 30, 1922.

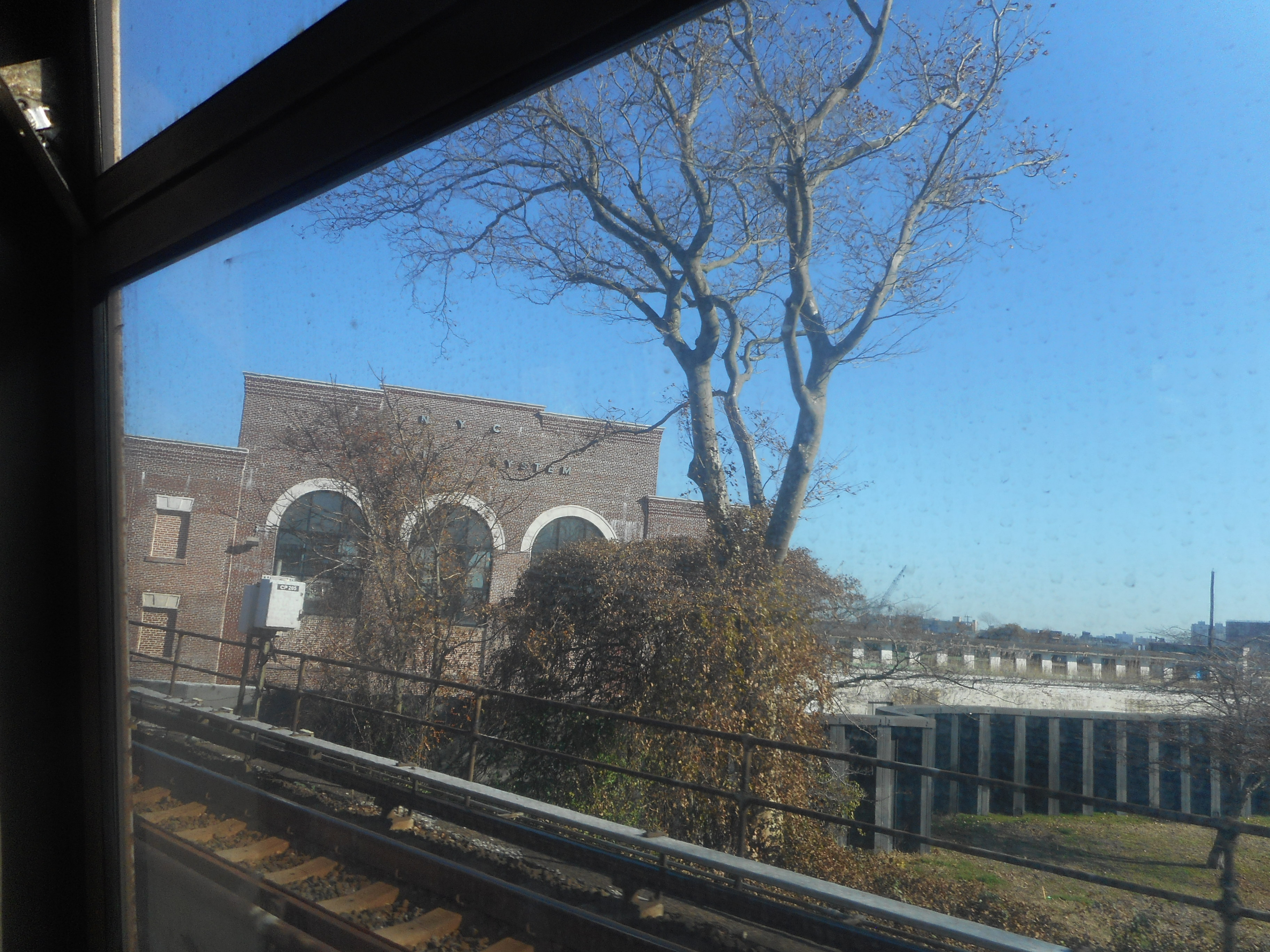
The former LIRR Substation # 5 at Hammels Wye, now a New York City Subway substation.

In 1939, a project to eliminate grade crossings was begun on the Rockaway Peninsula by elevating the line there, and completing plans that had existed since 1901. The elevated structure was completed to Hammels in 1941 and between Hammels and Far Rockaway in 1942.

The June 1947 weekday schedule shows 68 trains crossing Jamaica Bay north to south:

- 28 trains to Rockaway Park from Penn Station and 14 from Brooklyn
- five trains to Far Rockaway from Penn and one from Brooklyn
- two to Jamaica from Penn and one from Brooklyn
- 11 to Penn from Penn, and one from Brooklyn to Penn
- two to Brooklyn from Penn and three from Brooklyn to Brooklyn

Many trains had quick connections at the Ozone Park station.

=== Final years ===
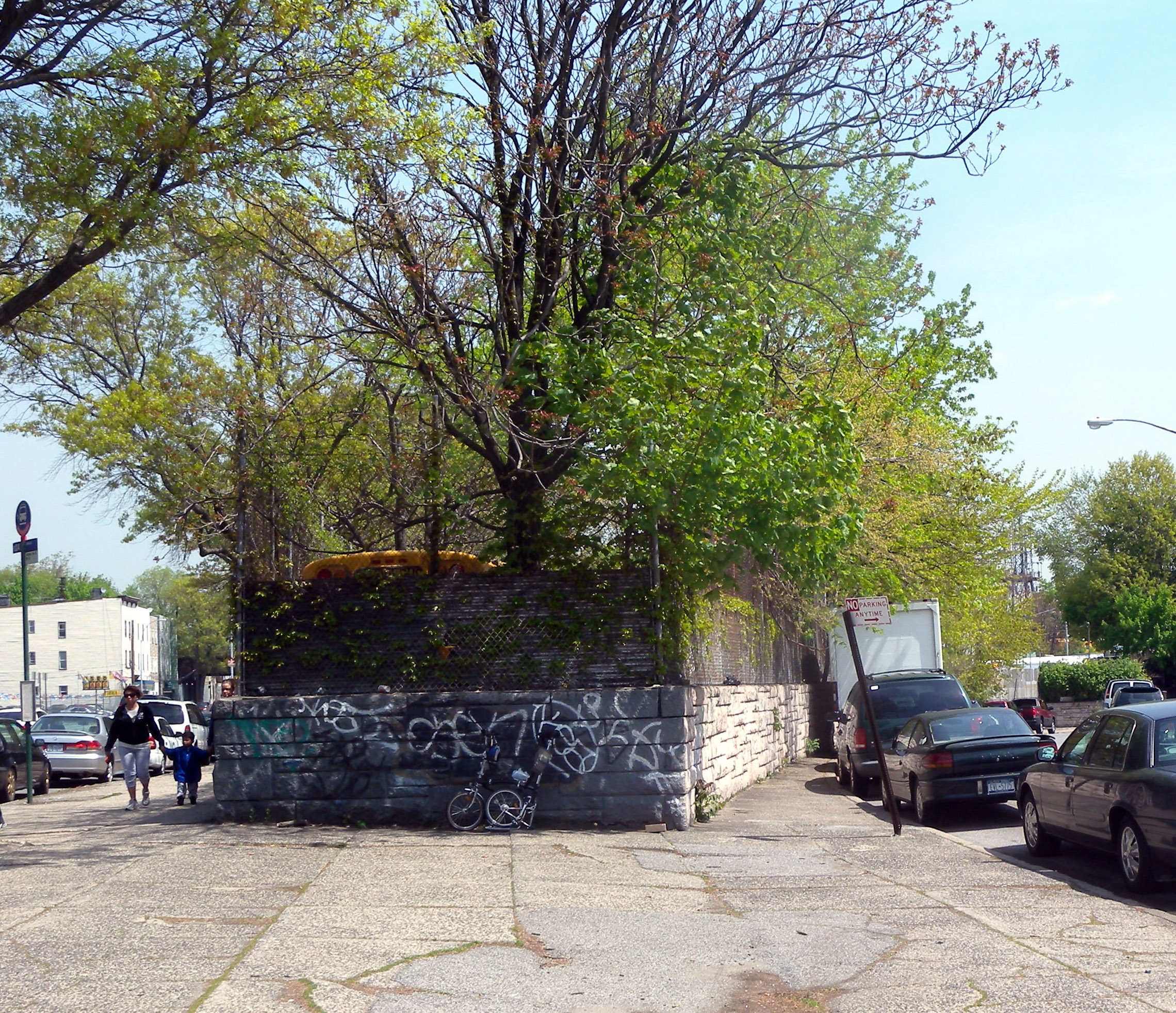
Incline from Atlantic Branch on Atlantic Avenue, now a bus parking lot

A fire on the trestle across Jamaica Bay between The Raunt and Broad Channel stations on May 7, 1950, cut service on the middle section of the line. This was among around 30 fires on the line since 1942. The LIRR continued to operate over the line with two services: one to Rockaway Park west of Hammels via the Far Rockaway Branch through Nassau County, and the other to Hamilton Beach via the Main Line's connection to the Rockaway Branch through Whitepot Junction. The Jamaica Bay trestle meanwhile remained out of service.

The LIRR, then on the verge of bankruptcy, saw the Rockaway Beach Branch south of Ozone Park as a liability and did not wish to spend the huge sum need to repair it, and sought to either sell or abandon it. The city of New York, however, saw great potential in extending subway service over Jamaica Bay and purchased the line on June 11, 1952, for $8,500,000, equal to $103,054,511 today.

All stations south of Ozone Park were taken out of service on June 27, 1955, and no trains ran on the line south of Ozone Park during the winter of 1955–1956 to allow the New York City Transit Authority to rebuild the line for subway operations. After an extensive rebuild of all trestles and converting the line for transit operations, which included a connection to the IND Fulton Street Line at Liberty Avenue via the former Fulton Street elevated line, the city began operating it as the IND Rockaway Line on June 26, 1956, to great fanfare.

The line's connection with the Atlantic Branch at Woodhaven Junction, consisting of an interlocking, tunnel portal and incline that rose to meet the elevated Rockaway Branch, was closed and removed in October 1955. This connection had primarily been used to allow trains from Brooklyn to reach Aqueduct Racetrack. The remains of the interlocking can still be seen in the Atlantic Avenue tunnel, while the incline is now used by Logan School Bus Company, who parks their bus fleet along the incline.

LIRR service continued on the remaining 3.5-mile (5.6 km) portion of the Rockaway Beach Branch between Rego Park and Ozone Park, under a lease from the New York City Transit Authority. Ridership sharply declined, however, and the line and its stations began to deteriorate due to vandalism and lack of maintenance.

On May 9, 1958, the New York Public Service Commission approved the LIRR's application to discontinue facilities at the five stations on the line, except for the platforms and suitable shelters. Two platforms would have to be preserved at Ozone Park, while one platform would have to be preserved at the other stations. At this point, just four daily weekday trains had operated on the branch, two Ozone Park-bound and two Penn Station-bound. The LIRR's application to eliminate two of these four trains was rejected. It had sought to eliminate the train leaving Ozone Park at 8:41 AM, which had an average of 92 riders a day, and the train leaving Penn Station at 7:01 PM, which had an average of 62 daily riders.

No connection with the parallel IND Rockaway Line was made in Ozone Park, further hurting any potential ridership growth. The LIRR, realizing that the truncated operation was better served by the subway, quietly ceased service on June 8, 1962, following approval from the New York Public Service commission. At the time, the Rockaway Beach Branch was the LIRR's only passenger-service branch, aside from the City Zone Terminals (Penn Station, Atlantic Terminal, and Long Island City), that ran entirely within the New York City limits.

== Legacy and planned restoration ==
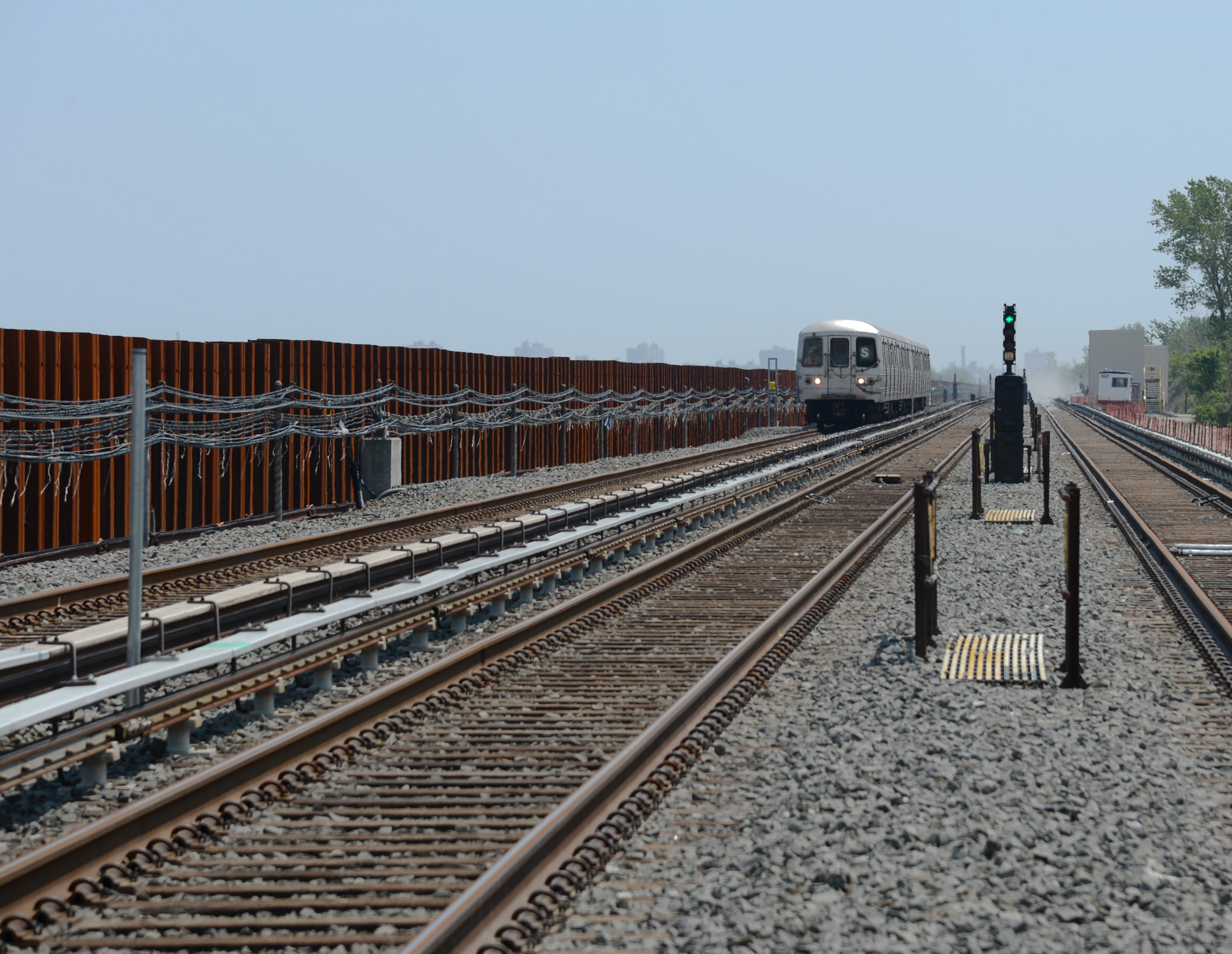
The IND Rockaway Line, seen here in 2013, was converted from a section of the Rockaway Beach Branch in 1955.

The city never filed to abandon the isolated section of double trackage between Rego Park and Ozone Park, due to the intended connection to the IND Queens Boulevard Line subway. This had been proposed under the IND Second System and later by Robert Moses, with an existing provision at the 63rd Drive subway station for a future connection to Whitepot Junction. An additional plan proposed a connection to the BMT Jamaica Line around the Brooklyn Manor station. However, in October 1955, shortly after LIRR service on the Queens portion of the Far Rockaway Branch ended, it was decided to terminate subway service at Liberty Avenue, with only the connection to the Fulton Street El completed.

The right-of-way was sold to the City of New York and is now in most sections administered by the New York City Department of Citywide Administrative Services ("DCAS"), except for a 7 acres (2.8 ha) section in Forest Park that has been mapped as parkland. The line remains officially out of service and is known by locals as "the forgotten spur", a name which dates back to the mid-1950s when the subway plans for the spur were dropped.

Much of the original infrastructure has either been removed, damaged, rotted or undermined, though some rails, wooden ties, electrical towers and even de-electrified third rails can still be found in some sections, with much of it dating from 1908 or earlier, when the line was originally electrified. The failure to reactivate the northern portion of the line had been attributed to the potential high costs of connecting it to the Queens Boulevard Line, and capacity issues on the line which persist today, making the Fulton line connection more feasible. There are proposals for rail service and a rail trail on this right-of-way. One proposal juxtaposes both plans.

The Rockaway Beach Branch is a regular haunt for hikers and urban explorers who have documented the abandoned stations along this route. The right-of-way can easily be seen, especially along the abandoned elevated embankment in Woodhaven and Ozone Park. The line is owned by the City of New York, with certain areas around the former junction with the Montauk Branch that have been redeveloped for interim use, including the Logan Bus Company lot.

=== 20th century plans ===
Since service ended in 1962, there have been repeated talks of restoring the line to active passenger service. The first of these proposals was a 1963 proposal that would have reactivated the line by connecting it to the IND Queens Boulevard Line.

As part of the 1968 Program for Action, there was a proposal to re-extend the LIRR to John F. Kennedy International Airport via the Van Wyck Expressway. Many Rockaway and central Queens residents wanted the link to run along the disused Rockaway Beach Branch, rather than along the Van Wyck, so that Rockaways residents could simultaneously get express service to Manhattan. The revised plan via the Rockaway Beach Branch was approved by the New York City Board of Estimate in 1969. The $210 million LIRR plan faced great criticism, and one particular section received heavy opposition. New York State Senator John J. Santucci, representing the Rockaways, raised concerns that a 2,900-foot (880 m) tunnel for the link, which would connect to the Rockaway Beach Branch, would require razing part of Forest Park, a plan that was opposed by his constituents.

Santucci said that the link's construction would irreversibly destroy part of the park, destroying a community landmark and "stripping away the resources of the people for the luxury of the few". In October 1974, the president of the Hammel Holland Seaside Civic Association wrote to Mayor Abraham Beame, "It is our earnest plea to you that your decision on this rape of Forest Park be rescinded." The association's president further said that although it would be cost-ineffective to create a premium service to JFK Airport, the Rockaway Beach Branch should still be reactivated for local passengers. In April 1976, Port Authority of New York and New Jersey Chairman William Ronan said that the link was "not feasible" due to the economic downturn and a corresponding decrease in air traffic.

A subsequent study for a dedicated two-lane bus rapid transit line to JFK along the Rockaway Beach Branch, called the "Transitway", was released in 1982. The line would also host taxis, limousines, and vans going to the airport. The Port Authority scrapped the plan the following year in the face of near-unanimous opposition from the communities along the route.

A study completed by the Urban Mass Transportation Administration (UMTA) in October 1990 titled "Coordinated Program to Improve Mass Transportation Accessibility between Queens and Manhattan", recommended using the branch to connect with the Jamaica Elevated to use the lower level of the Archer Avenue lines. The estimated cost for the line was $282 million in 1988 prices, with $80 million used for the extension from Aqueduct to JFK Airport.

A report completed by the New York City Department of City Planning (DCP) in 1991, which analyzed the potential use of inactive railroad rights-of-ways for transit service, recommended that a subway line be constructed to provide faster service to Midtown and to better serve southeastern Queens through the construction of park-and-ride facilities near JFK Airport. The cost of a subway line on the right-of-way was estimated to be $641 million in 1989 according to a study conducted by the Port Authority. The DCP issued a paper on airport access in March 1991 and proposed two rail alignments using the branch.

Route A would have run from Midtown Manhattan to JFK and LaGuardia Airports running through the 63rd Street Tunnel and Sunnyside Yard, above the LIRR on an elevated structure from 58th Street to Winfield Junction and then to White Pot Junction, over the Rockaway Beach Branch, before using two tracks of the IND Rockaway Line to Howard Beach, from where a 2-mile-long (3.2 km) extension could be built to JFK. Route B would have deviated at 48th Street, running via Northern Boulevard to 54th Street, from where it would extend on an elevated structure to connect with the New York Connecting Railroad at 64th Street, connecting with the LIRR Main Line near 51st Street. The DCP report recommended using the branch for subway service as opposed to commuter rail service so more stops could be added and so that the fares could be lower.

=== 21st century plans ===
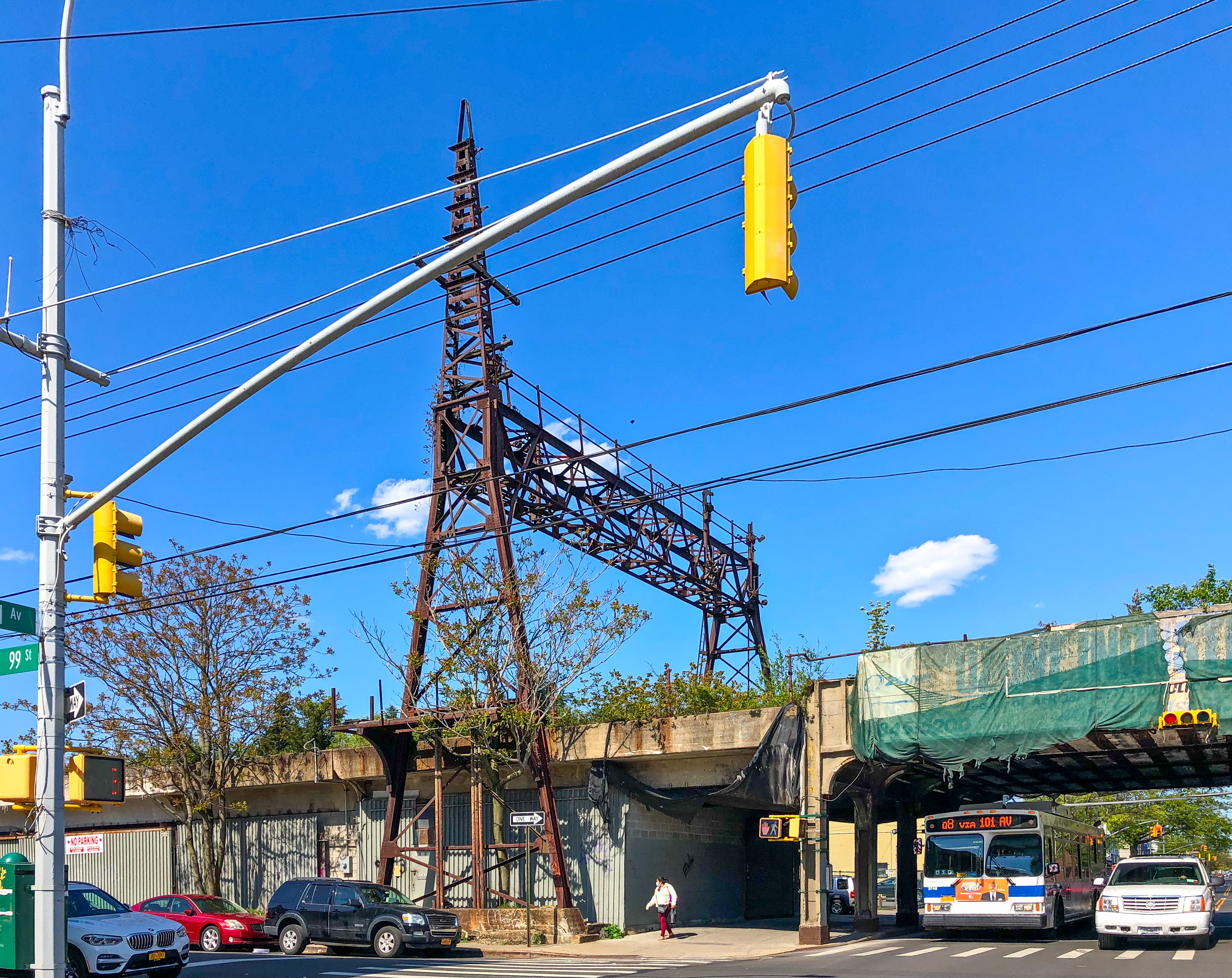
Trackage in Ozone Park in 2020

In 2001, the MTA suggested routing the proposed AirTrain JFK airport service over the line. The route was to begin at Penn Station, following the route of the original Rockaway Beach Branch, through Rego Park, Ozone Park, and ultimately branching off at the current Howard Beach–JFK Airport subway station (A train) served by the IND Rockaway Line. The routing was met with approval from advocacy groups including the Rockaway-based Committee for Better Transit, Inc. and the Rockaway Transit Coalition. However, local and political opposition from Forest Hills, Kew Gardens, Richmond Hill and Glendale hurt the prospects of restored service, as residents along the line complained that noise levels would increase and neighborhoods would be aesthetically marred.

An MTA study of the feasibility of reactivating the line found that it would not be convenient to 68% of commuters traveling between the outer boroughs and the Rockaways; in addition, people traveling from Far Rockaway would have to wait longer, on average, for a train. MTA also cited high operational and construction costs as detriments. It has been argued that restoration is needed to enable redevelopment of the Rockaways, "a potentially very-attractive area that has long suffered from slow transit service. Higher property values and influxes of people attracted by fast service to Midtown could revitalize en-route neighborhoods like Richmond Hill."

The success of a new racino at Aqueduct Racetrack led to a proposal from Governor Andrew Cuomo to build a massive convention center in the vicinity. Talks of reactivating the line were publicly endorsed in February 2012 by Assemblymen Phillip Goldfeder and Michael G. Miller. Goldfeder commented "The commute for people here is only going to go from bad to worse. You can't talk about a convention center without talking about transportation." Goldfeder and Miller said they are not opposed to turning sections of the line into a park named Queensway, but said people who live in Rockaway, Ozone Park, Howard Beach and other areas along the right-of-way have no quick or easy way to get into Manhattan.

The Genting Group, which operates the racino and has been asked to construct the convention center, was evaluating several plans to increase transportation access, and was committed to paying for part of the transportation improvements. Queensway advocates are against resumption of rail service, stating that current bus service fills current transportation needs in the area. Congressmen Hakeem Jeffries and Gregory Meeks added their support for the project in March 2013. Both representatives will push to allocate federal transportation subsidies to study a plan for restored passenger service.

Another suggestion for reuse was proposed in the MTA's Twenty-Year Capital Needs Assessment for 2015–2034, published in October 2013. An issue the MTA is trying to address is to provide transversal routes between the core trunk routes. The report suggests that the cheapest, easiest, and quickest way of doing this is to revitalize existing lines like the freight-only Bay Ridge Branch (for the Triboro RX service) or the Rockaway Beach Branch. No money has been allocated to the project, and MTA spokesperson Kevin Ortiz has said while it is just laying out future options. Assemblyman Phillip Goldfeder, who represents Howard Beach and Rockaway, announced in November 2013 that Queens College would be undertaking a study of all options for the disused line. The study will be done by students, who are local residents of Queens.

The state of New York approved a new MTA study to reactivate the Rockaway Beach Branch, with the report due by March 2017. As of January 5, 2017, the MTA and Port Authority are evaluating use of the Rockaway Beach LIRR for a one-seat trip between Penn Station and Grand Central and JFK. Though a study of the branch's possible reactivation was completed in September 2018, it was not published until October 2019, following the publication of a news story about the study's delayed release. The study concluded that reactivation as an LIRR line may cost $6.7 billion, while as a subway line it may cost $8.1 billion. This cost estimate has been questioned by a report put out by QueensRail Corp and TEMS (see Rockaway Beach Branch § QueensRail), which showed that the real costs would fall in the range of $3.4 to $3.7 billion.

If either option is carried out, the branch would require considerable reconstruction. Under the LIRR restoration option, the stations at Rego Park, Parkside, Woodhaven, Ozone Park, Aqueduct Racetrack, and Howard Beach would be rebuilt. The subway option is similar except that it would not rebuild the LIRR's Rego Park station, and would rebuild the Brooklyn Manor station instead. Other obstacles would include developments that have been built in the right-of-way after the branch's 1962 abandonment, as well as severe deterioration to much of the existing infrastructure. A second component of the study examined options for possible extensions to JFK Airport, including a possible connection to the AirTrain JFK or a wholly new alignment.

Many people who live along the line support the conversion either to a rail trail or back to a rail line. Many others, whose properties abut the ROW, are opposed to the ROW's redevelopment in any manner. A number of properties adjacent to the right-of-way have expanded their property fences over sections of the former right-of-way without legally acquiring the rights to the land.

==== Queensway ====
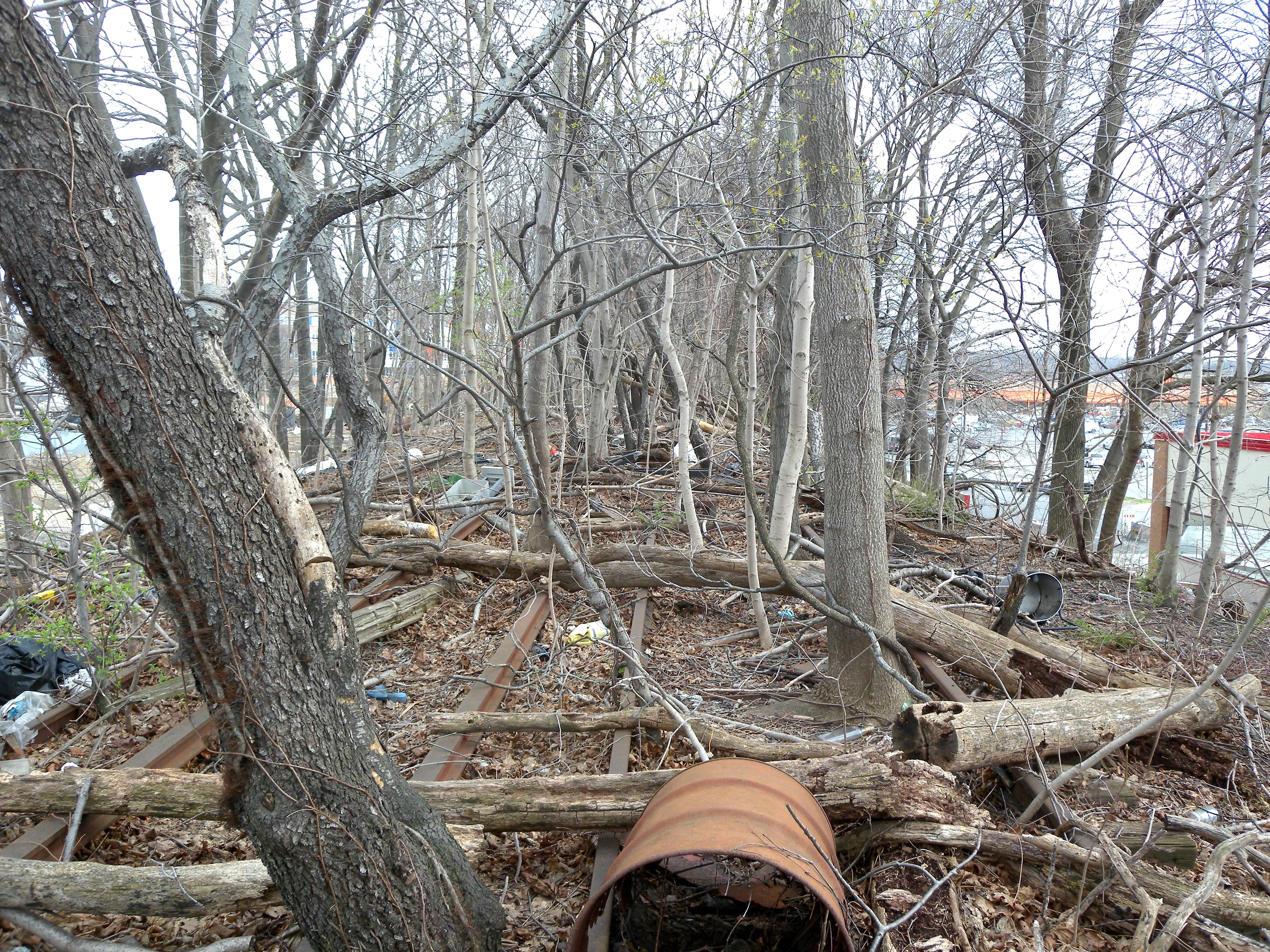
Reuse of the line after over 50 years of closure will require extensive rebuilding.

In 2005, residents began suggesting a conversion of the line to a 3.5-mile (5.6 km) greenway/linear park to be called the "Queensway", with proponents arguing that the unused railroad would provide green spaces and economic development opportunities like those associated with Manhattan's High Line Park. In mid-2013, the American Institute of Architects held a design contest for potential designs for the rail trail. The recycling of the railway into a trail is supported primarily by people who do not live adjacent to or near the right-of-way (ROW).

In October 2014, the Friends of the Queensway announced that they had finished a year-long study on the viability of the Queensway. However, it still needs about $122 million in funding. Friends of the Queensway stated that they wanted to appeal to city mayor Bill de Blasio for funding, because it supported two of the mayor's agendas: the Vision Zero traffic safety initiative, and de Blasio's proposal for more parkland in the city; under the plan, there would be bike lanes, walking trails, and access points at major intersections. It would benefit the local economy and include, among other things, "exercise stations, food concessions and outdoor nature classrooms". So far, $1.2 million has been raised. After the feasibility study about the branch's possible reactivation was published in October 2019, a Friends of the Queensway member said, "Our hope is that the high costs provide an opening to consider a park." Andrew Yang, in his campaign for the 2021 New York City mayoral election, expressed support for the proposed park.

The proposed park has been criticized by transit advocates such as the Queens Public Transit Committee, who prefer to rebuild the rail line as a proposed expansion of the New York City Subway. More than 322,000 people live within one mile of the Rockaway Beach Branch, combined with the fact that New York City Subway service in the area is limited, with only the BMT Jamaica Line (J and Z trains) passing through the neighborhood. Another argument is that the Queensway would pass through Forest Park, where there is already a large 538 acres (218 ha) park. There is also opposition from residents, who fear that their privacy would be invaded and rents raised as a result of the Queensway.

In September 2022, mayor Eric Adams announced that the Queensway would be built. Adams announced that $30 million had been allocated to construct the park's first phase, between Metropolitan Avenue and Forest Park, and that an additional $5 million would be spent on environmental studies. The announcement was controversial because the plans did not include space for a future rail line, as QueensLink proponents had proposed. The New York Times wrote that "both sides feel passionately that they are in the right", since central Queens lacked both parkland and rail lines. QueensLink supporters continued to advocate for converting the line into a combined rail and park corridor. The federal government promised to provide $117 million in early 2024 for the Queensway plan. The federal government had paid out $5.6 million of the grant before the remaining $111.4 million was revoked in 2025 as part of the One Big Beautiful Bill Act.

==== QueensLink (formerly QueensRail) ====
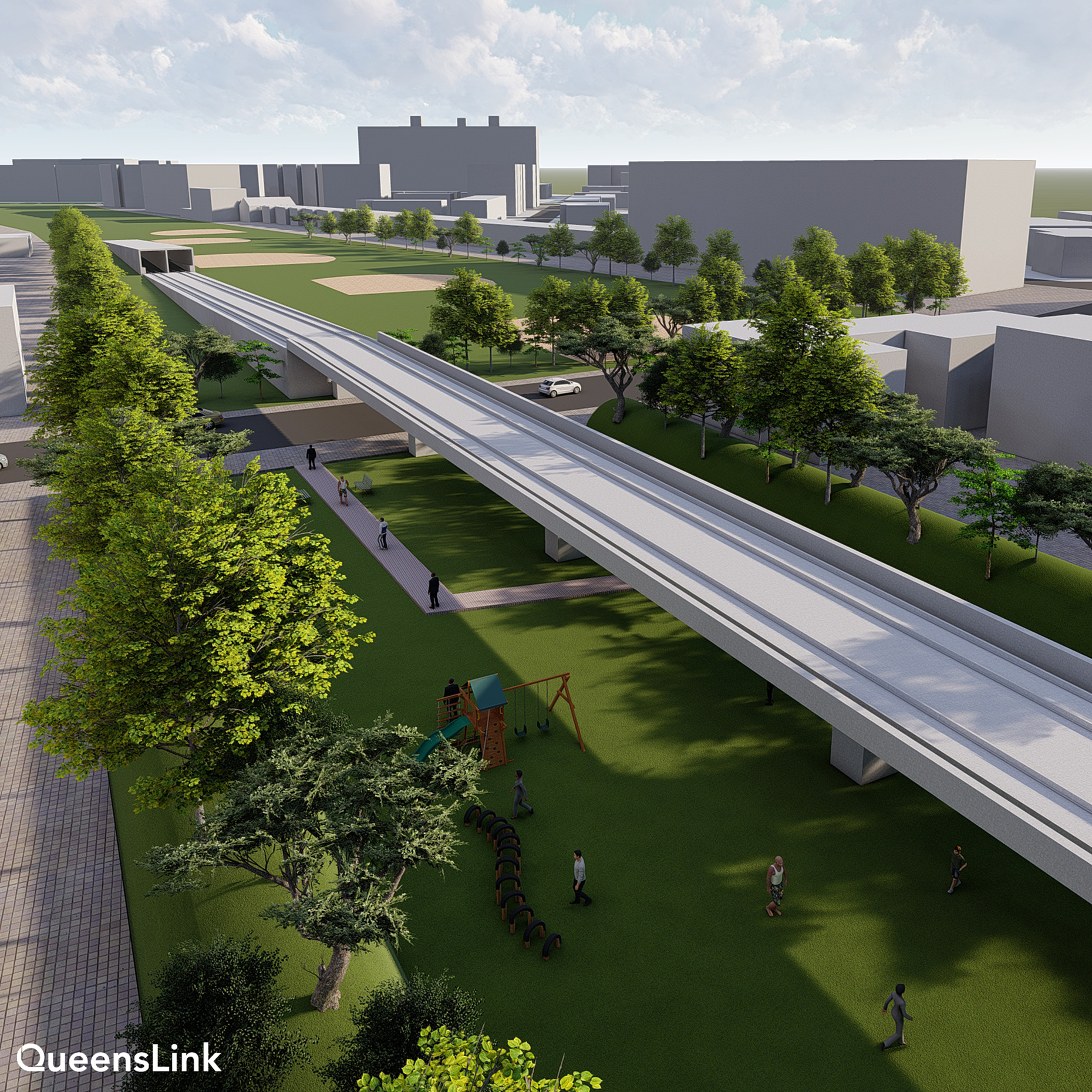
An artist's rendering showing a possible rebuilding of the right of way to allow for new transit and park space below.

QueensRail Corp, a nonprofit 501(c)(3) organization, was founded by the Queens Public Transit Committee in 2016 to promote better transit in Queens and specifically reusing the Rockaway Beach Branch for transit. In contrast to the Queensway, which was conceived as a park project, QueensRail was conceived as a transportation project. In March 2017, the Queens Chamber of Commerce held a debate to discuss both plans. Travis Terry of Friends of the Queensway argued for the park while Rick Horan of QueensRail argued his for rail service; when prompted, both said a compromise was not possible. Soon after, Horan reached out to blogger and cartographer Andrew Lynch, who outlined a proposal where both parks and rail would be integrated side by side. Under Horan and Lynch's concept, the right of way would include both a new park and a rail line above. They rebranded, choosing the name QueensLink to represent how the plan would "link" the northern and southern parts of Queens.

The plan outlined by QueensLink involves connecting the Rockaway Beach Branch to the Queens Boulevard Line local via a tunnel south below 67th Avenue instead of by running along 66th Avenue, which means they will not be able to use the provisions (bellmouths and a flyunder) east of the 63rd Drive-Rego Park station constructed in anticipation of the IND Second System. QueensLink prefers this plan because it will reduce risk of damage to building foundations and enable construction equipment staging to be located more conveniently for residents. The line would then run in a tunnel beneath an embankment carrying the bicycle path. The bike path would connect to the right-of-way from Queens Boulevard via 63rd Drive and the existing underpass below the LIRR main line at Whitepot Junction. The path would cross Fleet Street over the extant railroad bridge while the new rail line continues in a tunnel. The proposed Forest Hills greenway south of Fleet Street would also consist of the bicycle and pedestrian paths on the embankment with the rail in tunnels below. The Metropolitan Avenue station would provide access up to the paths or down to trains and provide bicycle parking for commuters. The rail would emerge from the tunnel south of the station, and run across the Lower Montauk Branch on a new bridge, with the paths alongside. The new rail line would continue south along the old right-of-way from this point, with new sound barriers and plant growth disguising the line. The bicycle path would split off at Park Lane South and run south along 102nd Street, crossing under the line at Atlantic Avenue and joining it on the west side of the viaduct, which is currently wide enough for four tracks. The viaduct is in poor condition, and the organization proposes rebuilding it, preserving the businesses at ground level beneath it and containing two tracks and a linear park above. The junction with the Fulton Street Line at Liberty Avenue would be reconstructed into a flying junction such that trains could continue south on the IND Rockaway Line.

QueensLink aims to provide the benefits of both transit and public park space. The plan includes 33 acres of park space and new bike paths that would increase connectivity in the local bike network, and it still includes reactivating the Rockaway Beach Branch, which runs through a section of Queens that has limited access to rapid transit and experiences some of the longest commute times in the city. Not only does QueensLink aim to provide a new north–south connection in Queens, the proposed changes would enable increase service throughout the borough: capacity on the Queens Boulevard Line is limited by the ability to terminate trains at Forest Hills–71st Avenue station, and QueensLink claims that branching M trains before this point would free up 50% more capacity for the local service and thereby enable G service to terminate at Forest Hills as it did before 2010. They also claim that elimination of the Rockaway Park Shuttle and its replacement by M trains would also increase the level of service seen in the Rockaways by 100%.

QueensLink officials pressured the MTA to release the Rockaway Beach Branch reactivation study in October 2019. QueensLink raised discretionary funds from several Queens city councilmembers and hired the transportation consulting firm TEMS to evaluate the MTA's cost estimate. TEMS's report, released in June 2021, showed the $8.1 billion cost estimate had used non-standard formulas related to inflation, contingency costs, and professional services. By recalculating the costs based on approved Federal Transit Administration guidelines the report found that the true costs would lie between $3.4 and $3.7 billion. The report also found that the project would have a significant economic benefit for the city, including the creation of up to 150,000 new jobs during its lifetime. The report noted that the plan's intention of connecting multiple parallel transit lines will have a positive impact on ridership and increase the economic benefits, noting that these types of circumferential routes are being developed in other metropolitan regions such as that of Washington, D.C. because of these benefits. A poll conducted in 2024 by the State Senator for the district, Joseph Addabbo, indicated that residents near the abandoned line overwhelmingly support the QueensLink project in comparison to either Queensway or leaving the line as-is. Support ranged from 85% in South Richmond Hill to 65% in Richmond Hill.

In January 2025, the United States Department of Transportation awarded a $400,000 grant to study the feasibility of building QueensLink as part of the Reconnecting Communities Pilot Grant Program established by the Bipartisan Infrastructure Law The program requires an 80–20 funding match where QueensLink needs to provide $100,000 in funding from non-federal sources. They announced on February 17, 2025, that they had received the donations necessary to fund the 80–20 match after 39 days of fundraising. In the 2025 New York City mayoral election, Zohran Mamdani, a noted supporter of the project, won the Democratic primary election held in June. After he won the mayoral election, Mamdani did not say whether he still supported the plan. A report released in 2026 predicted that the QueensLink plan could be built for $4.8 billion and attract 75,000 daily riders. In June 2026, the Mamdani administration allocated $43 million to Queensway; Mamdani said it would not impede investment in QueensLink, although a QueensLink executive expressed skepticism of the statement.

== List of stations ==
| Miles | Name | Opened | Closed | Re-opened |
|---|---|---|---|---|
| | Grand Street | July 1, 1913 | 1925 | |
| | Rego Park | May 1928 | June 8, 1962 | |
| | Matawok | 1910 | May 25, 1913 | |
| | Parkside | September 15, 1927 | June 8, 1962 | |
| | Brooklyn Hills | 1882 | 1911 | |
| | Brooklyn Manor | January 9, 1911 | June 8, 1962 | |
| | Woodhaven Junction | 1893 | June 8, 1962 | |
| | Ozone Park | 1883 | June 8, 1962 | |
| | Aqueduct | 1883 | October 3, 1955 | June 28, 1956 as Aqueduct–North Conduit Avenue |
| | Howard Beach formerly Ramblersville | June 1899 | June 27, 1955 | June 28, 1956 as Howard Beach |
| | Hamilton Beach | October 16, 1919 | June 27, 1955 | |
| | Howard a.k.a. Howard's Landing | 1898 | October 23, 1907 | |
| | Goose Creek | 1888 | September 1935 | |
| | The Raunt | 1888 | May 23, 1950 | |
| | Broad Channel | 1880/1881 | May 23, 1950 | June 28, 1956 as Broad Channel |
| | Beach Channel | 1888 | May 31, 1905 | |
| | Hammels formerly Hammel | August 26, 1880 | 1941 | |
| | Holland | August 26, 1880 | October 3, 1955 | June 28, 1956 as Beach 90th Street |
| | Playland formerly Steeplechase | April 1903 | October 3, 1955 | June 28, 1956 as Beach 98th Street |
| | Seaside | August 26, 1880 | October 3, 1955 | June 28, 1956 as Beach 105th Street |
| | Rockaway Park | August 26, 1880 | October 3, 1955 | June 28, 1956 as Rockaway Park–Beach 116th Street |

== Gallery ==
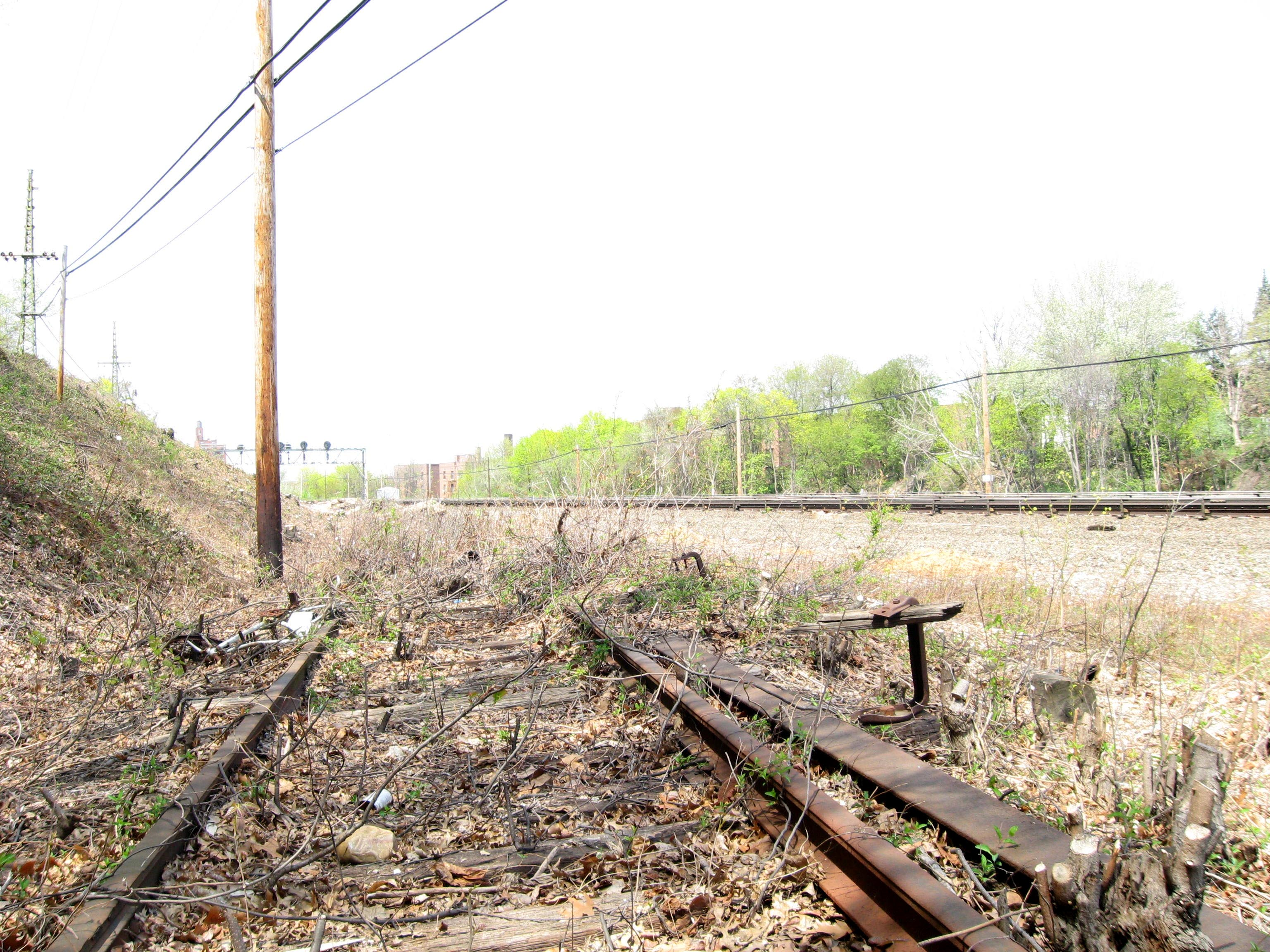
Southbound track at White Pot Junction

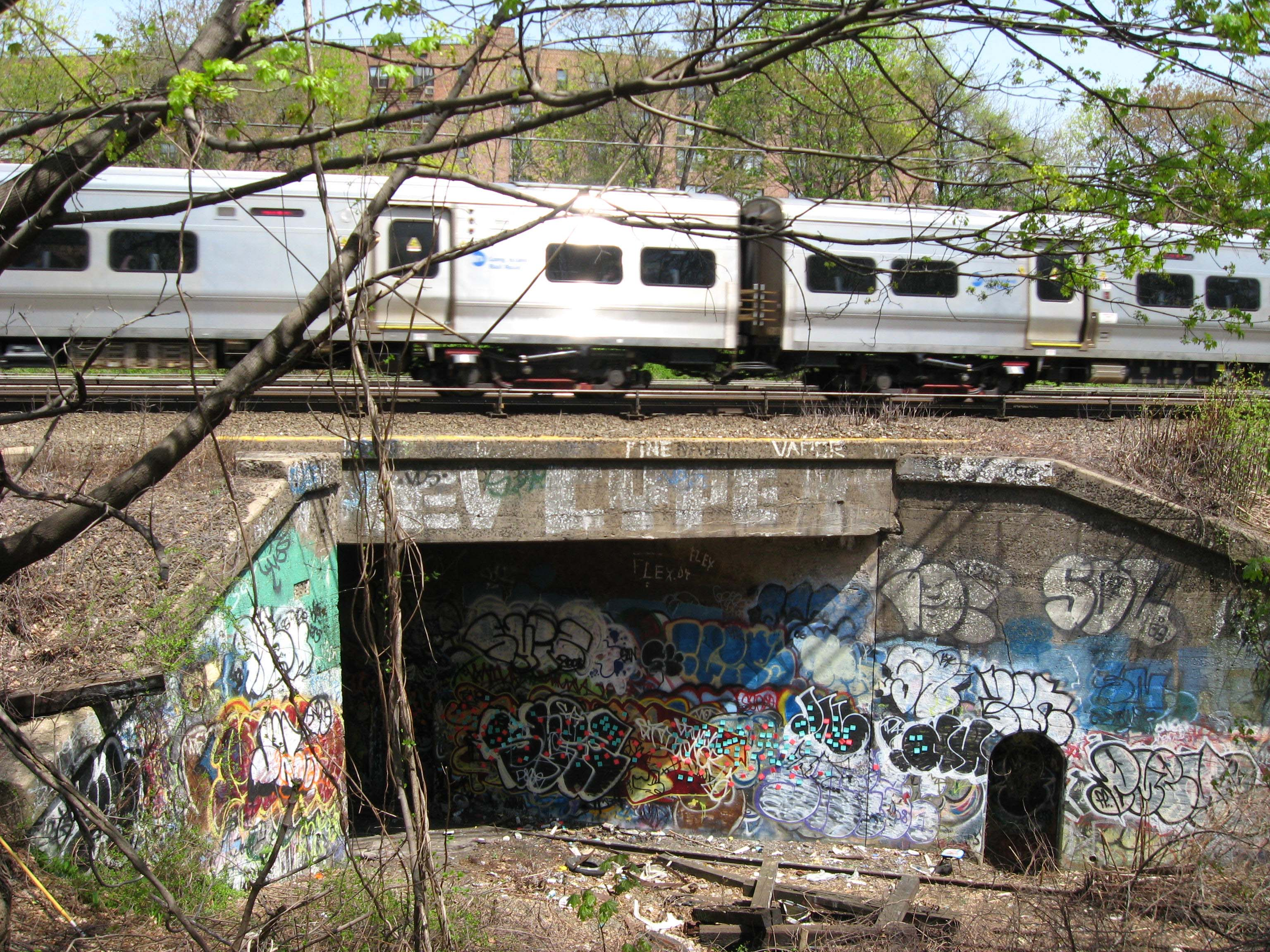
Underpass for northbound track

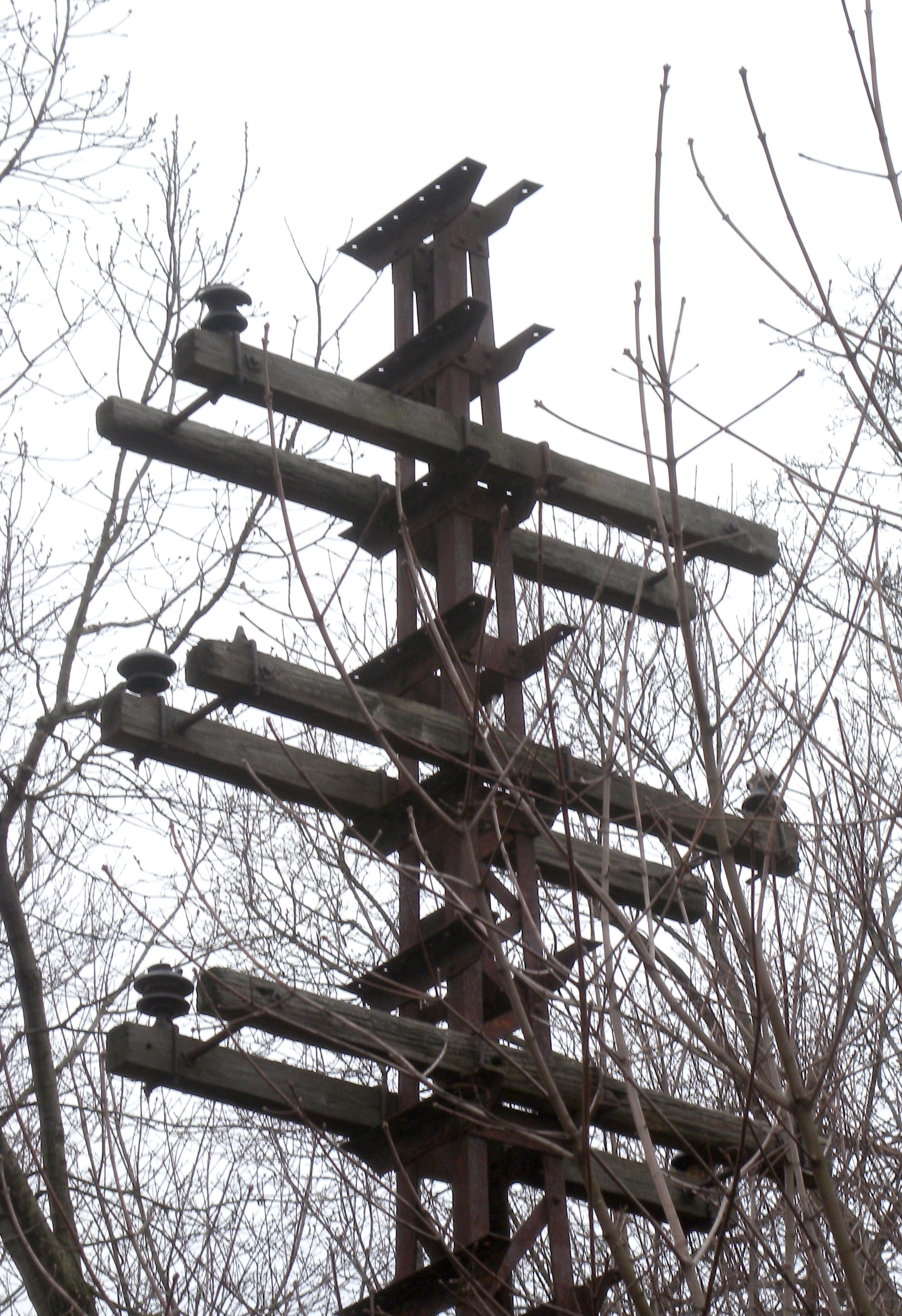
Wireless electricity pole with ceramic insulators

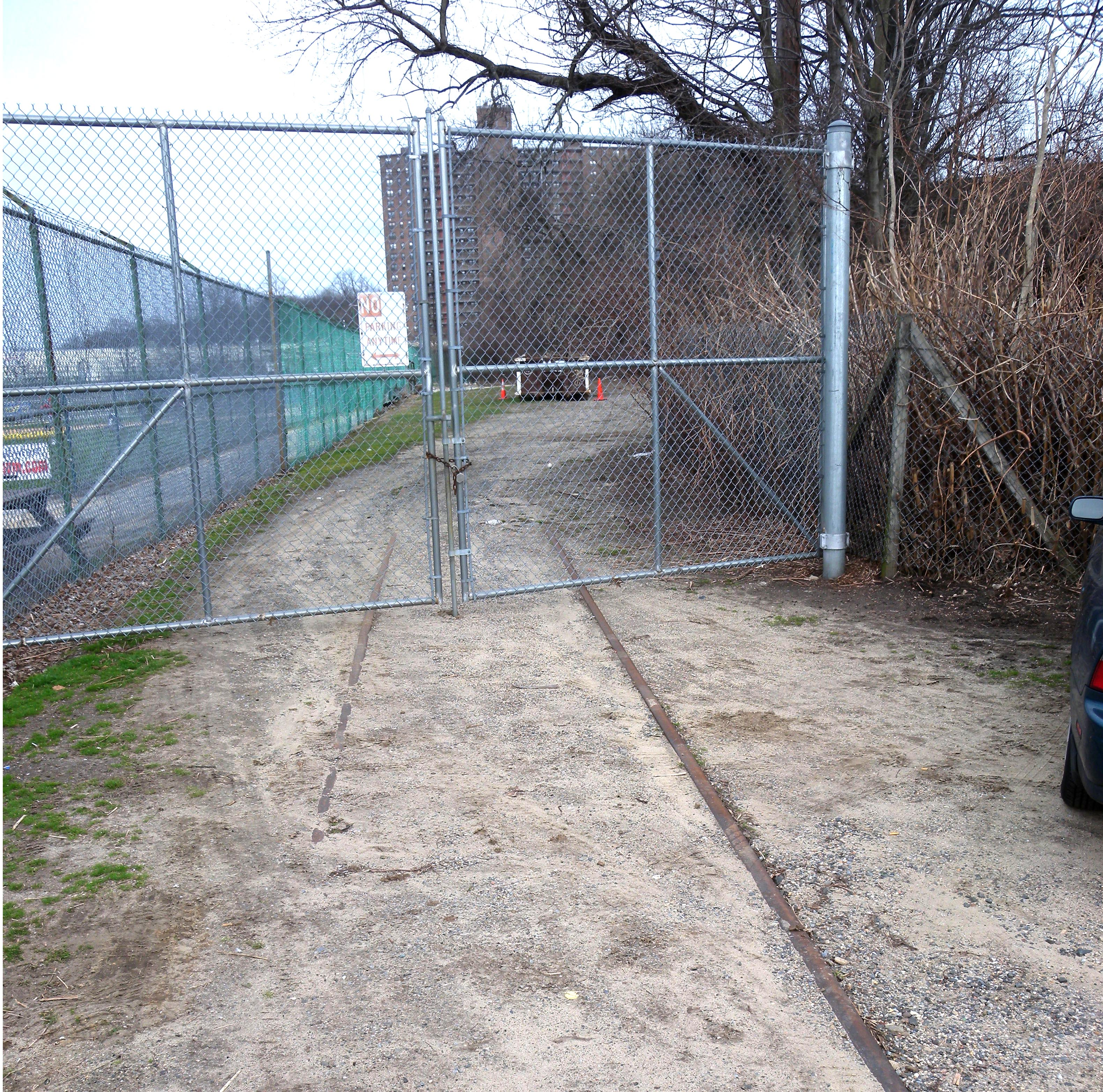
Former Glendale Junction remnant

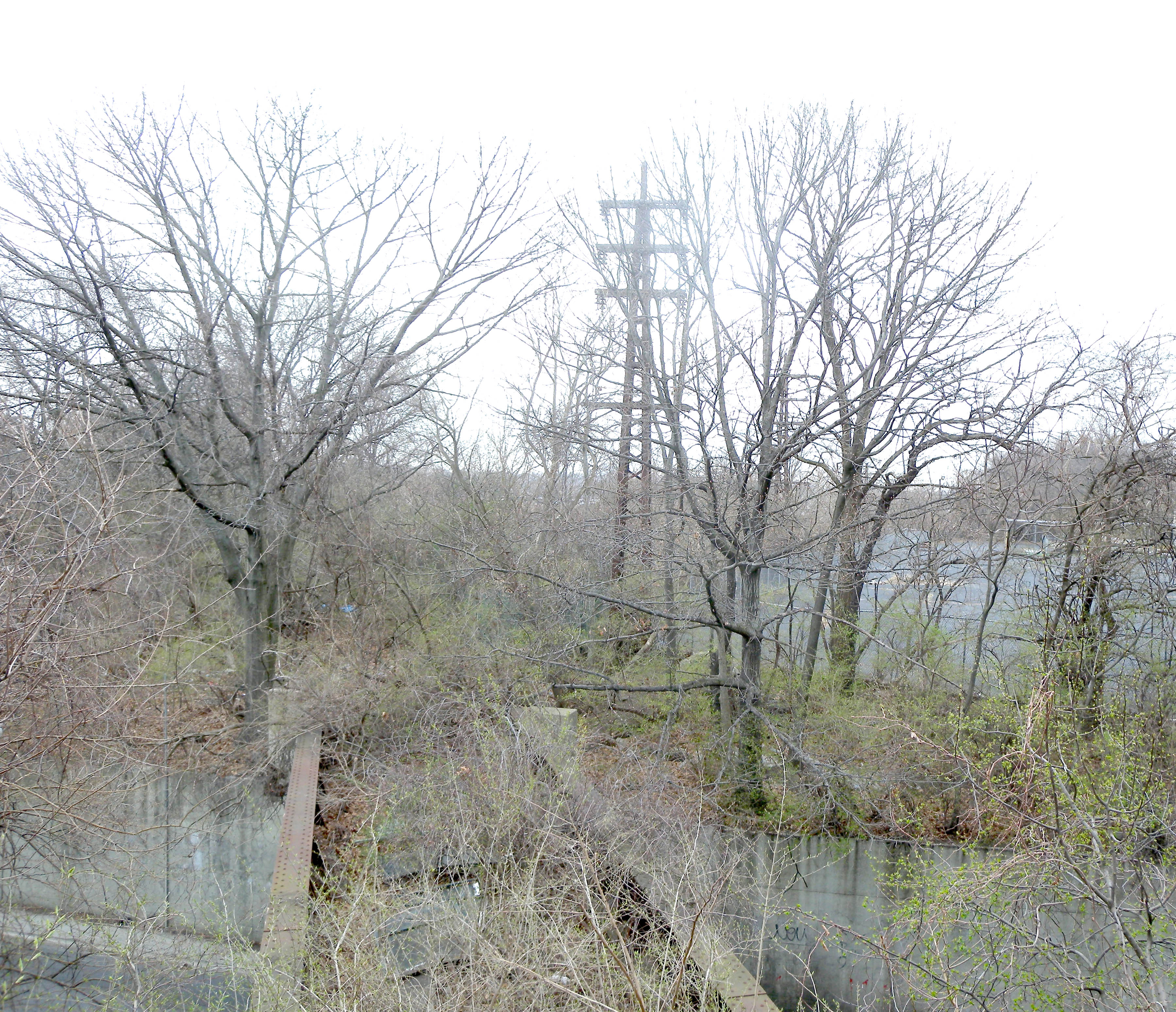
Glendale Junction

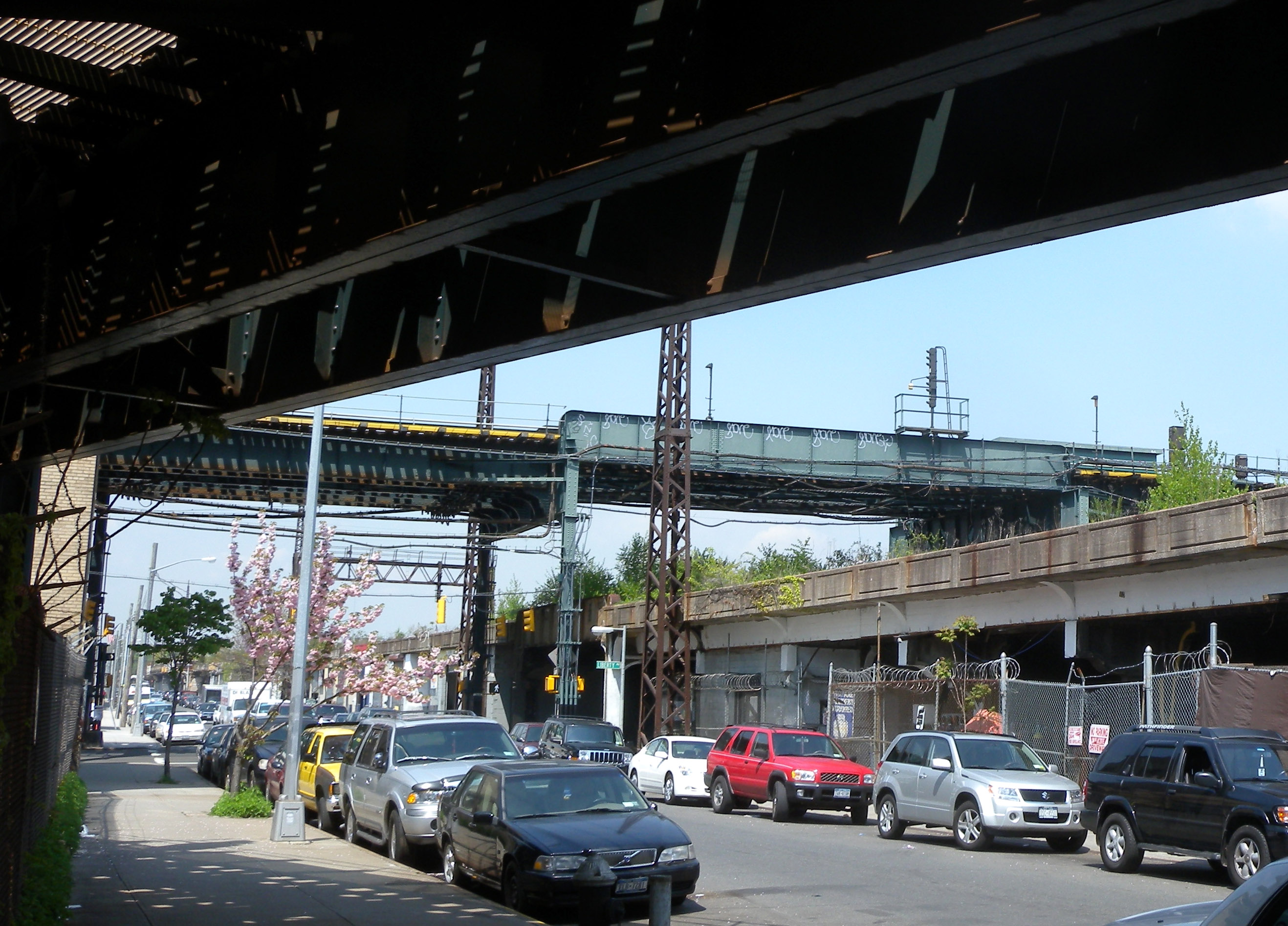
Underneath the IND Rockaway Line looking towards the Fulton Street Line crossing over the derelict Rockaway Beach Branch

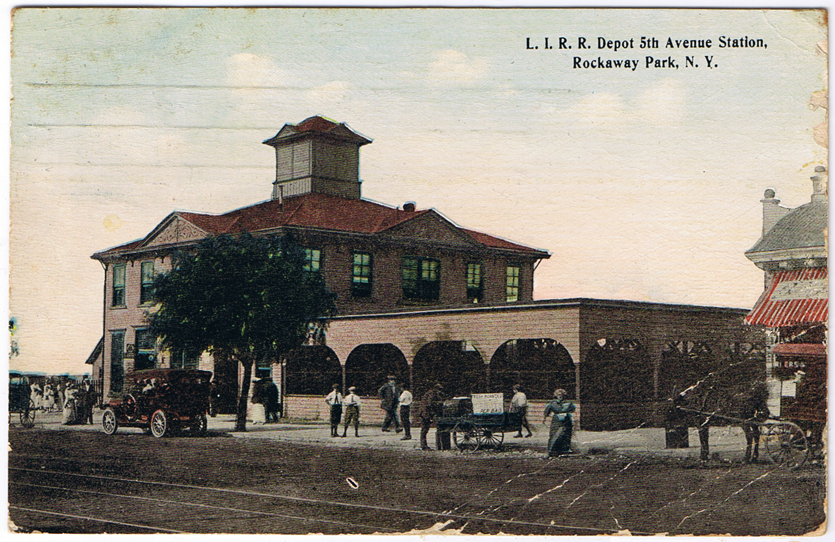
Rockaway Park station before 1913

== See also ==
- Bloomingdale Trail, an abandoned viaduct in Chicago
- High Line (New York City), a rail trail in the west side of Manhattan
- Lowline, a park planned for the abandoned trolley terminal adjacent to the Delancey Street – Essex Street subway station in lower Manhattan
- Harsimus Stem Embankment
- Montauk Cutoff
- Promenade plantée
- Rail trail
- Rails-to-Trails Conservancy (RTC)
- Reading Viaduct, an abandoned viaduct in Philadelphia
