= The Raunt station =

Train station in New York City (1888–1950)

The Raunt
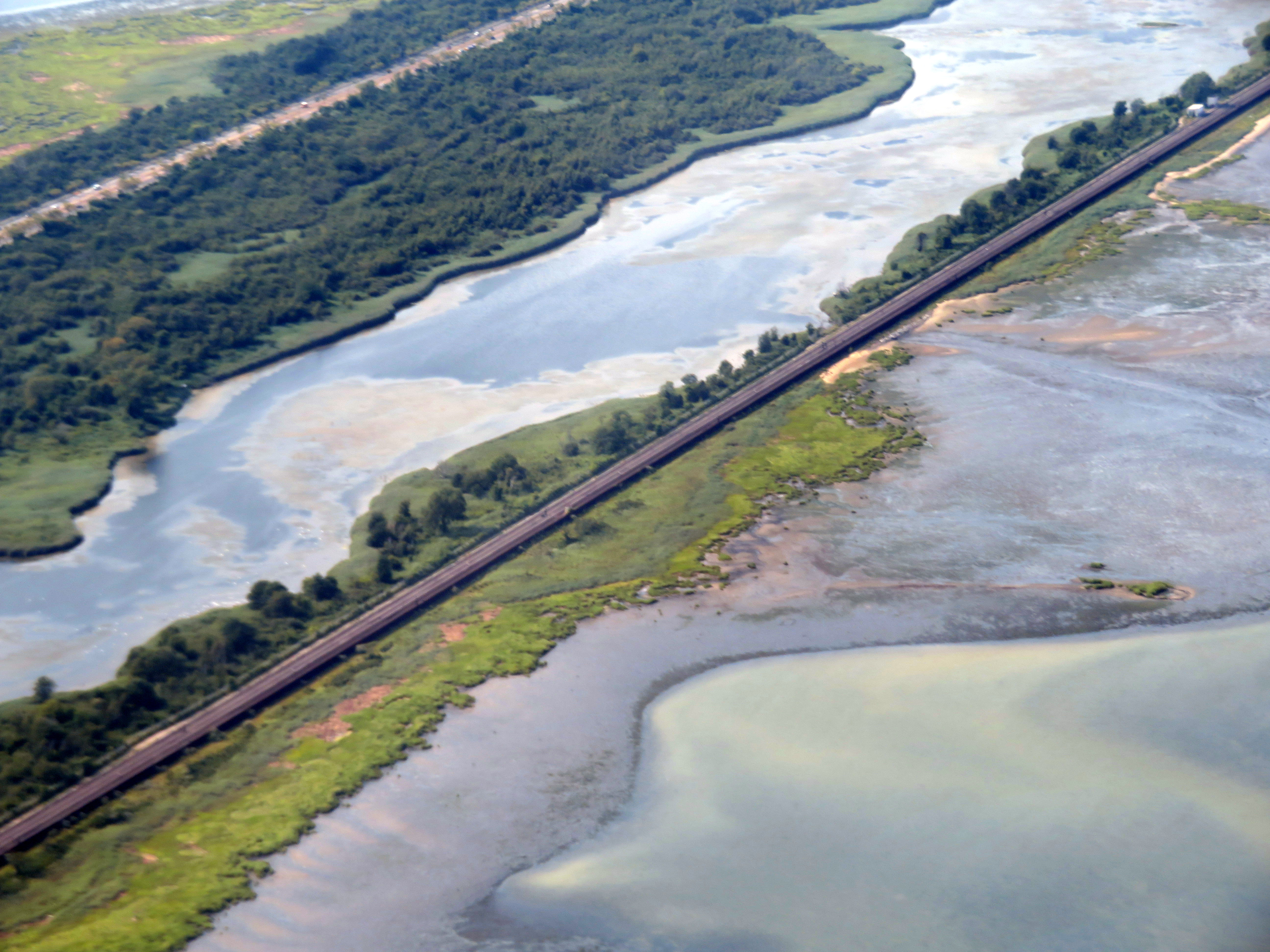
- Aerial view of the former station site in 2019

General information
- Location: Jamaica Bay; Queens, New York City
- Coordinates: 40°37′10.8″N 73°49′08.2″W
- Line: Rockaway Beach Branch
- Platforms: 2 side platforms
- Tracks: 2

History
- Opened: 1888
- Closed: May 23, 1950
- Electrified: July 26, 1905

Former services
Preceding station	Long Island Rail Road	Following station
Hamilton Beach toward Goose Creek	Rockaway Beach Division	Broad Channel toward Gibson or Rockaway Park
Preceding station	Brooklyn Rapid Transit	Following station
Goose Creek toward Chambers Street	Union Elevated Broadway Line 1898–1917	Broad Channel toward Rockaway Park
Goose Creek toward Park Row	Union Elevated Fifth Avenue Line 1899–1905	Broad Channel toward Rockaway Park
Location

The Raunt was a former Long Island Rail Road station on the Rockaway Beach Branch. It had no address and no station house, because it was meant strictly as a dropping-off point for fishermen using a small island in Jamaica Bay. The station was located 1,300 feet (400 m) west of signal station "ER" (presumably #96), and near WU Tower. It was named for the channel on the south side of the island where it stood.

== History ==
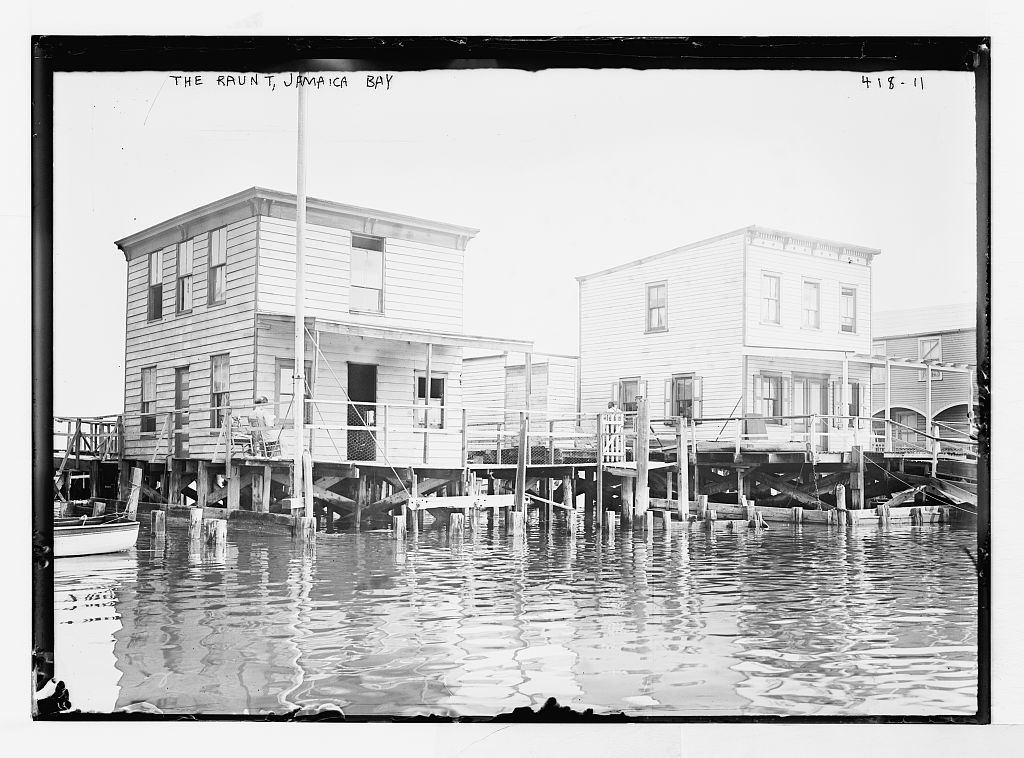
The Raunt c. 1911

The Raunt station opened in 1888 by the New York and Rockaway Beach Railway. It had a wooden pedestrian bridge between the two sheltered platforms, and was electrified on July 26, 1905. The Jamaica Bay Trestle was prone to fires, but The Raunt was the source of a May 7–8, 1950 fire that broke out between here and Broad Channel, destroyed the bridge over Jamaica Bay and thus doomed the entire line. Service on the Rockaway Beach Branch west of Hammels continued only via the Far Rockaway Branch, until October 3, 1955, when the branch was abandoned west of Far Rockaway itself, along with the entire Rockaway Beach Branch south of Ozone Park.

Both branches were sold to the New York City Transit Authority, which replaced the Rockaway Beach Branch, and the Queens half of the Far Rockaway Branch with the IND Rockaway Line. The Broad Channel station was replaced in 1956 as a New York City Subway station, but the small community at The Raunt was ordered demolished by New York City parks commissioner Robert Moses and became part of the Jamaica Bay Wildlife Refuge.
