= Ozone Park station (LIRR) =

Train station in New York City (1884–1962)

Ozone Park
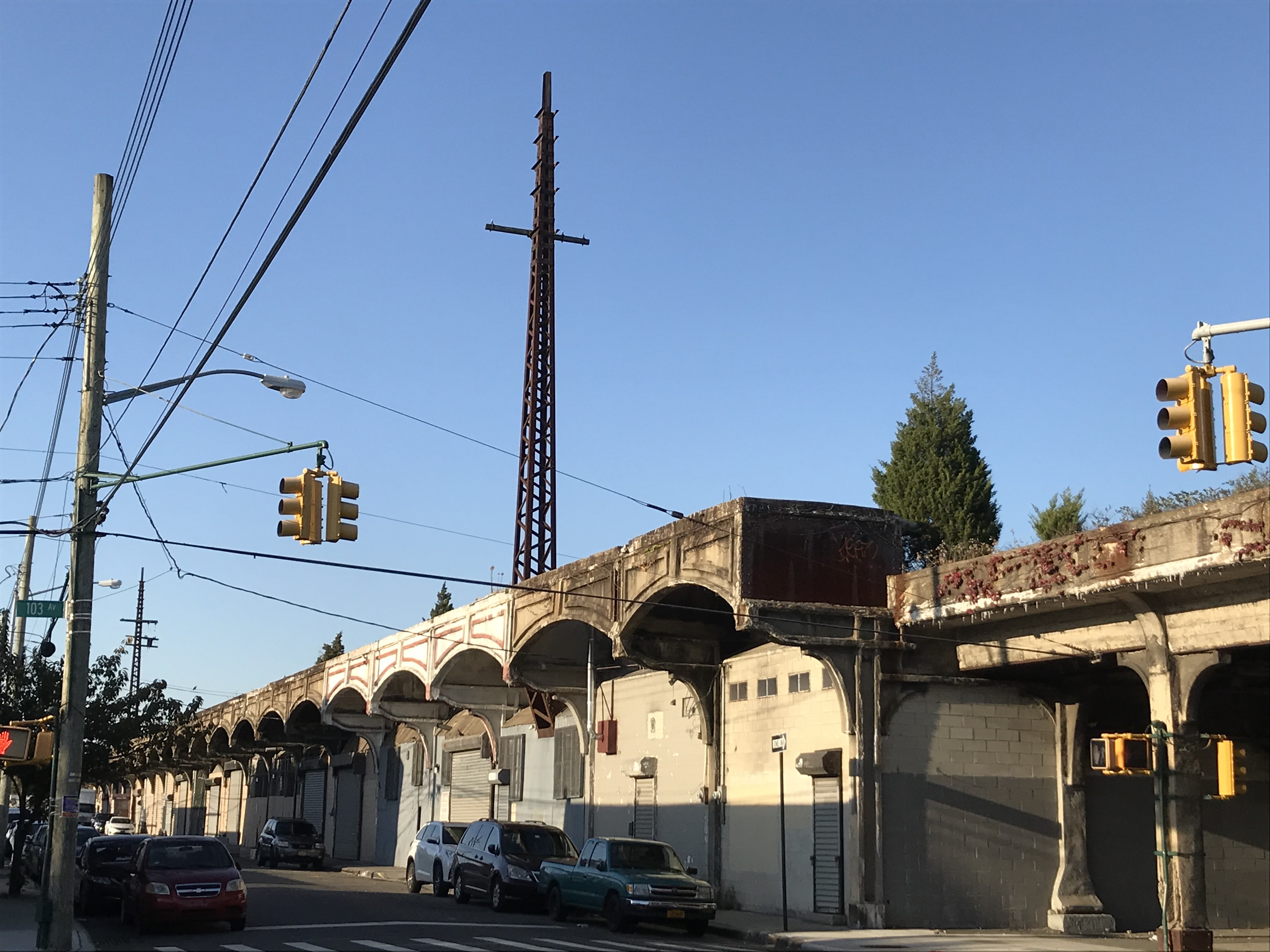
- Site of the former Ozone Park station in October 2019.

General information
- Location: 99th Street and 101st Avenue; Ozone Park, Queens, New York
- Coordinates: 40°41′04″N 73°50′30.75″W
- Line: Rockaway Beach Branch
- Platforms: 2 side platforms
- Tracks: 4
- Connections: Atlantic Branch

Other information
- Station code: None

History
- Opened: 1884
- Closed: June 8, 1962; station abandoned
- Rebuilt: 1930–1931
- Electrified: 1905

Former services
Preceding station	Long Island Rail Road	Following station
Woodhaven Junction toward Woodside	Rockaway Beach Division	Aqueduct toward Gibson or Rockaway Park
Preceding station	Brooklyn Rapid Transit	Following station
Woodhaven Junction toward Chambers Street	Union Elevated Broadway Line 1898–1917	Howard Beach toward Rockaway Park
Location

Ozone Park is a former Long Island Rail Road station in New York City. Located at 99th Street and 101st Avenue in Ozone Park, Queens, it was a major station along the Rockaway Beach Branch until the line's closure in 1962.

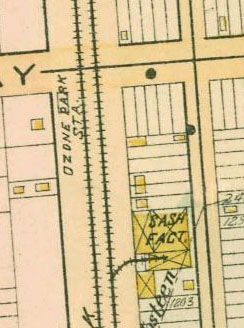
1891 Map of Ozone Park Station

Ozone Park was the northernmost four-track station on the line, with two concrete side platforms. North of the station, a two-track connection diverged west towards the Atlantic Branch and the line contracted to two tracks at Woodhaven Junction. The station was set up to enable passengers from Penn Station on the Main Line and Flatbush Avenue on the Atlantic Branch to reach the Rockaway Park area or Far Rockaway section simply by changing trains ("Change At Ozone Park!"). The trains had stacked end-to-end, and passengers had transferred back and forth on the platform. Operation in the reverse direction also occurred. Due to street restrictions below, which limited the right-of-way width above, platforms were on the outside of the four track right-of-way, making a cross-platform interchange impossible. To accommodate this, the platforms were made exceptionally long so that non-rush hour length multiple unit (MU) trains could stack end-to-end and allow passengers to transfer. A set of crossovers from the outside tracks to the inner tracks were at the east end of the station, to permit trains stopping at Ozone Park to run express after the station stop, or to perform the reverse move.

== History ==
Ozone Park station was opened by the New York, Woodhaven and Rockaway Railroad in 1884.

In the early expansion plans of the city's Independent Subway System (IND) in the 1930s, the Rockaway Beach Branch was planned to be absorbed into the new subway, which would have turned Ozone Park into a stop on the IND Queens Boulevard Line or a new Queens crosstown line. In 1950, the Rockaway Beach Branch south of Ozone Park closed after the trestle on Jamaica Bay between The Raunt and Broad Channel Stations was destroyed by a fire. The city purchased the entire line in 1955 in preparation to convert the line for rapid transit service. The portion south of Ozone Park was connected to the former Fulton Street elevated running on Liberty Avenue to create the IND Rockaway Line, allowing A trains to travel to Rockaway Park and Wavecrest (and later Far Rockaway). The remainder of the line between Rego Park and Ozone Park was leased back to the LIRR, who continued to operate along it pending construction of an additional connection to the Queens Boulevard Line in Rego Park.

The connection to the Queens Boulevard Line, however, was never constructed and Ozone Park became the southern terminal for LIRR service on the branch. Service on the line was greatly reduced due to the severed connection to the namesake destination of the line, as well as vandalism and criminal activity at stations on the branch including Ozone Park. The station closed on June 8, 1962 when passenger service between Rego Park and Ozone Park ended.

Since the closing of the line, many businesses in the area have set up shop in the portion of trestle below the station. In the late 1980s the F.B.I. used the abandoned platforms to set up a sting operation to monitor the activities of John Gotti and the Gambino crime family, whose social club was down the street from the station.

As of 2020, Ozone Park station exists in ruins. Electric utility poles and Pennsylvania Railroad-era signal bridges also adorn the right of way.
