= Parkside station =

Train station in New York City (1927–62)

Parkside
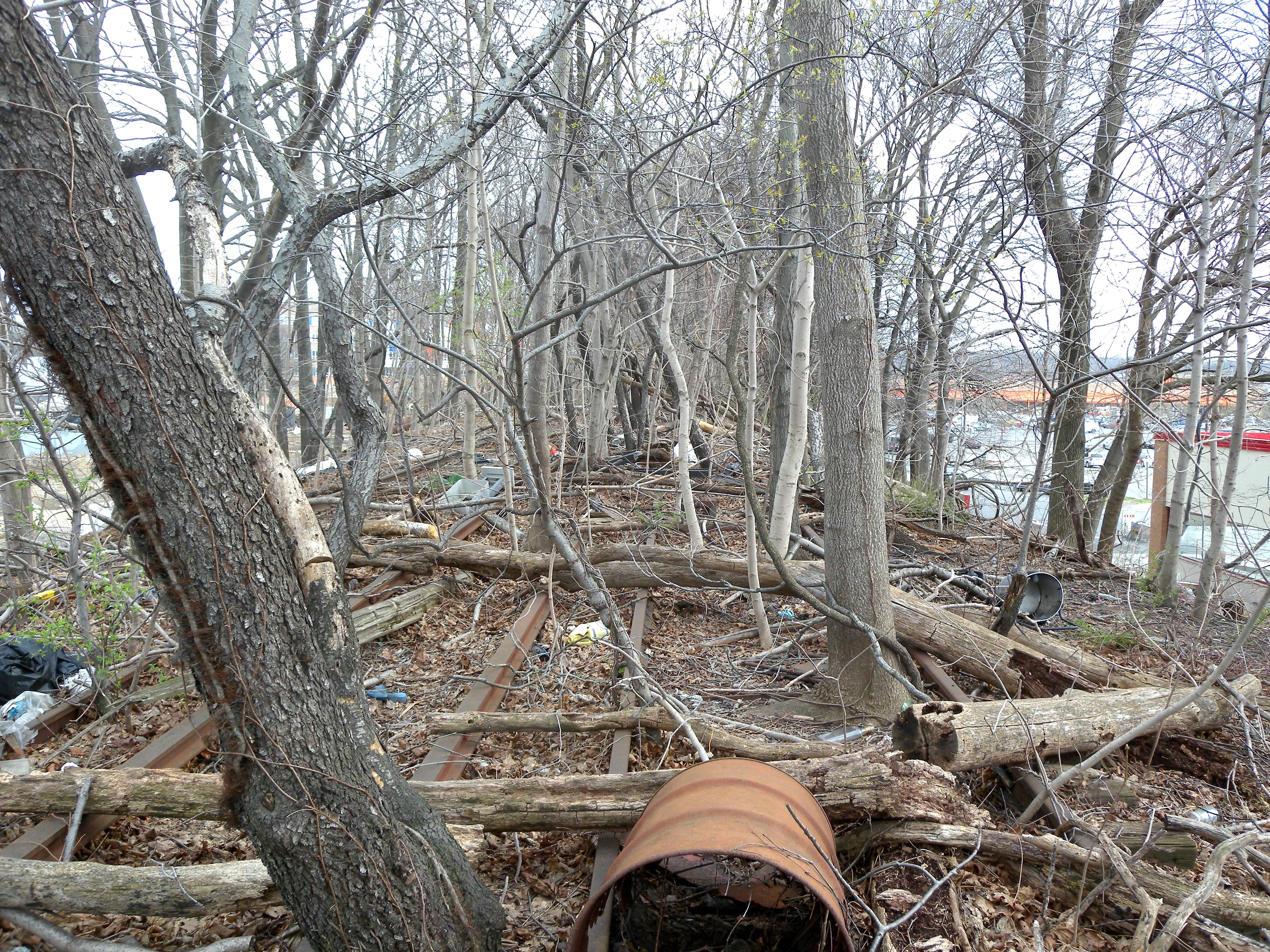
- Site of former Parkside station

General information
- Location: Metropolitan Avenue and Selfridge Street; Forest Hills, Queens, New York
- Coordinates: 40.71185°N 73.85667°W
- Owner: City of New York; Long Island Rail Road (former)
- Line: Rockaway Beach Branch
- Platforms: 2 side platforms
- Tracks: 2

Other information
- Station code: None

History
- Opened: September 15, 1927
- Closed: June 8, 1962
- Electrified: 1905
- Former names: Glendale (September–October 1927)

Former services
Preceding station	Long Island Rail Road	Following station
Rego Park toward Woodside	Rockaway Beach Division	Brooklyn Manor toward Gibson or Rockaway Park
Location

Parkside is a former elevated Long Island Rail Road (LIRR) station on the north side of Metropolitan Avenue on the border of the Rego Park, Forest Hills, and Glendale neighborhoods in Queens, New York City. Opened in 1927, the wooden station was part of the Rockaway Beach Branch and was the northernmost station on the branch before the junction with the Main Line at Rego Park Station and the terminus of the line at Grand Street station in Elmhurst. It also had a connecting spur to the Montauk Branch east towards Richmond Hill station. The station was closed in 1962, twelve years after the LIRR had abandoned the Rockaway portions of the line.

== History ==
=== Opening ===
Prior to the construction of the station, Rockaway Beach Branch service north of Ozone Park traveled via the Atlantic Branch to Flatbush Terminal, or via the Montauk Branch to Long Island City. Between 1908 and 1911, the branch was extended north past the Montauk Branch to the Main Line; this new grade-separated section was known as the Glendale Cut-off, and allowed service from the branch to operate to Penn Station in Manhattan.

On March 24, 1927, the New York State Transit Commission ordered the LIRR to construct a new station at Metropolitan Avenue along the cut-off to alleviate congestion at the Forest Hills station on the Main Line, and to replace the nearby Glendale and Atlas Yard stations (the current site of The Shops at Atlas Park at Cooper Avenue) on the Montauk Branch. The station was opened on September 15, 1927. It was originally named "Glendale" as a substitute for the former station on the Montauk Branch. It was renamed "Parkside" on October 23, 1927, due to its proximity to Forest Park, after protests over the station name from the local community. The Parkside name is shared with a nearby post office at Metropolitan Avenue and Continental (71st) Avenue.

The opening of the Parkside station helped spawn development in the area, which previously consisted of empty lots and farmland. Over 100 homes were constructed to form the Forest Hills Crest community. The block immediately to the south of the station, bounded by Metropolitan Avenue, Woodhaven Boulevard, and Union Turnpike, became an industrial superblock. In the early expansion plans of the city's Independent Subway System (IND) in the 1930s, Parkside was one of the stations that would have been absorbed into the new subway, connecting to the IND Queens Boulevard Line at its 63rd Drive station in Rego Park, north of the junction with the LIRR Main Line.

=== Closure ===
In 1950, the Rockaway Beach Branch south of Ozone Park closed after the trestle across Jamaica Bay between The Raunt and Broad Channel stations was destroyed by a fire. The city purchased the entire line in 1955, but only the portion south of Liberty Avenue was reactivated for subway service as the IND Rockaway Line. Ridership declined on the remaining portion of the branch and service was reduced. Due to vandalism, the railroad removed the station's southbound track and put both platforms out of service in 1958. The platforms were replaced with a low-level concrete platform in the former trackbed. The Rockaway Beach Branch ceased operations on June 8, 1962, and all stations along the line, including Parkside, were closed.

== Station layout ==
P Former platform level	Side platform, demolished
P Former platform level	Northbound	Trackbed
P Former platform level	Southbound	Trackbed
P Former platform level	Side platform, demolished
G	Street level	—

The station had two tracks and two wooden high-level side platforms, with four small wooden shelters on both platforms. Exit stairs were located on Metropolitan Avenue. No trace of the station exists today.

North of the station, the line veered west to merge with the LIRR Main Line at Whitepot Junction. Just south of the station, near the Union Turnpike overpass, was a junction with the Montauk Branch, which was known as Glendale Junction. A wye from the westbound Montauk Branch track merged with the Rockaway Beach Branch going north, and another from the eastbound Montauk Branch track going south. The Rockaway Beach Branch passed over the Montauk Branch on a wooden trestle.

=== Current condition ===
The Forest Hills Volunteer Ambulance Corps is located in the vicinity of the former station. The former industrial block west of the line is currently a shopping center. The land east of the line south of Metropolitan Avenue where the Parkside-Montauk spur used to be is currently the site of the Metropolitan Avenue Public School Campus built from 2006 to 2010; the northern entrance to the campus is on Metropolitan Avenue, and the school building sits on the former right-of-way of the northern Montauk connection. The bridge above the Montauk Branch has been demolished. The right-of-way south of the demolished bridge, the southern wye and the Montauk branch define the border of a nearby Little League Baseball field complex. Shortly after the opening of the Metropolitan campus in 2010, the nearby trestle and overpass above Metropolitan Avenue were deemed to be structurally unsound. However, no action was taken, and in 2014, a study of the condition of the line found that 20% of the underside of the bridge had exposed reinforcement bars.
