= Maspeth High School =

Public school in New York City

Coordinates: 40.7297°N 73.8877°W

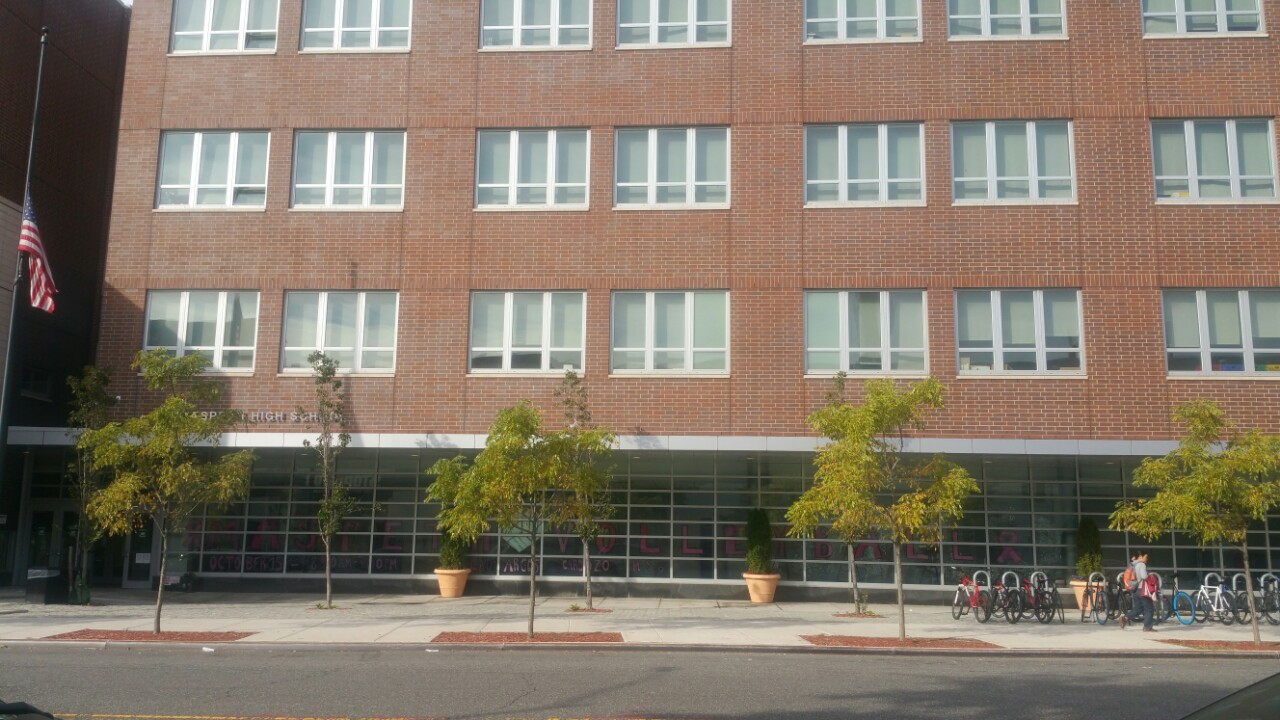

Location
- 54-40 74th St; Queens, New York 11373; United States

Information
- Type: Public secondary
- Established: 2011
- Principal: Selin Alicanoglu
- Grades: 9-12
- Enrollment: 1209 (2018-2019)
- Colors: Navy Blue, Kelly Green
- Athletics conference: Public School Athletic League
- Mascot: Argonaut
- Yearbook: Abstracta
- Website: http://www.mhs.nyc

Maspeth High School is a public high school in Elmhurst, Queens. The school opened in September 2013 with 273 students at the Metropolitan Avenue Campus in Forest Hills, Queens and serves primarily students from NYC District 24 in Northern Queens. Maspeth High School is a traditional, open enrollment, district public school. Currently Maspeth High School serves grades 9-12 and has 1,209 students. Maspeth High School has over 40 clubs and 27 varsity sports teams. Maspeth's teams are known as the Argonauts.

== History ==
After one year at the Metropolitan Campus on Metropolitan Avenue, Maspeth High School moved to its own building located at 54-40 74th Street in Maspeth, Queens, adjacent to the Long Island Expressway and between 57th Avenue and Grand Avenue.

The founding principal of Maspeth High School is Khurshid Abdul-Mutakabbir who proposed a classical high school model to the New York City Department of Education in December 2010. His proposal was accepted on January 4, 2011 and matched to the newly constructed Maspeth High School campus building for opening the following September. Abdul-Mutakabbir was removed June 2021 pending the investigation on widely spread grade fraud. He reached a settlement with the Department of Education in 2022.
