= Glendale station =

Glendale station may refer to:

- Glendale Transportation Center, a station in Glendale, California
- Glendale station (LIRR), a former station in Glendale, Queens, New York
- Parkside station or Glendale station, a station in Forest Hills, Queens, New York
