= Rego Park station =

Rego Park station may refer to:

- Rego Park station (LIRR)
- 63rd Drive–Rego Park station
