= Queens Metropolitan High School =

Public school in New York City

Coordinates: 40°42′30.71″N 73°51′20.55″W

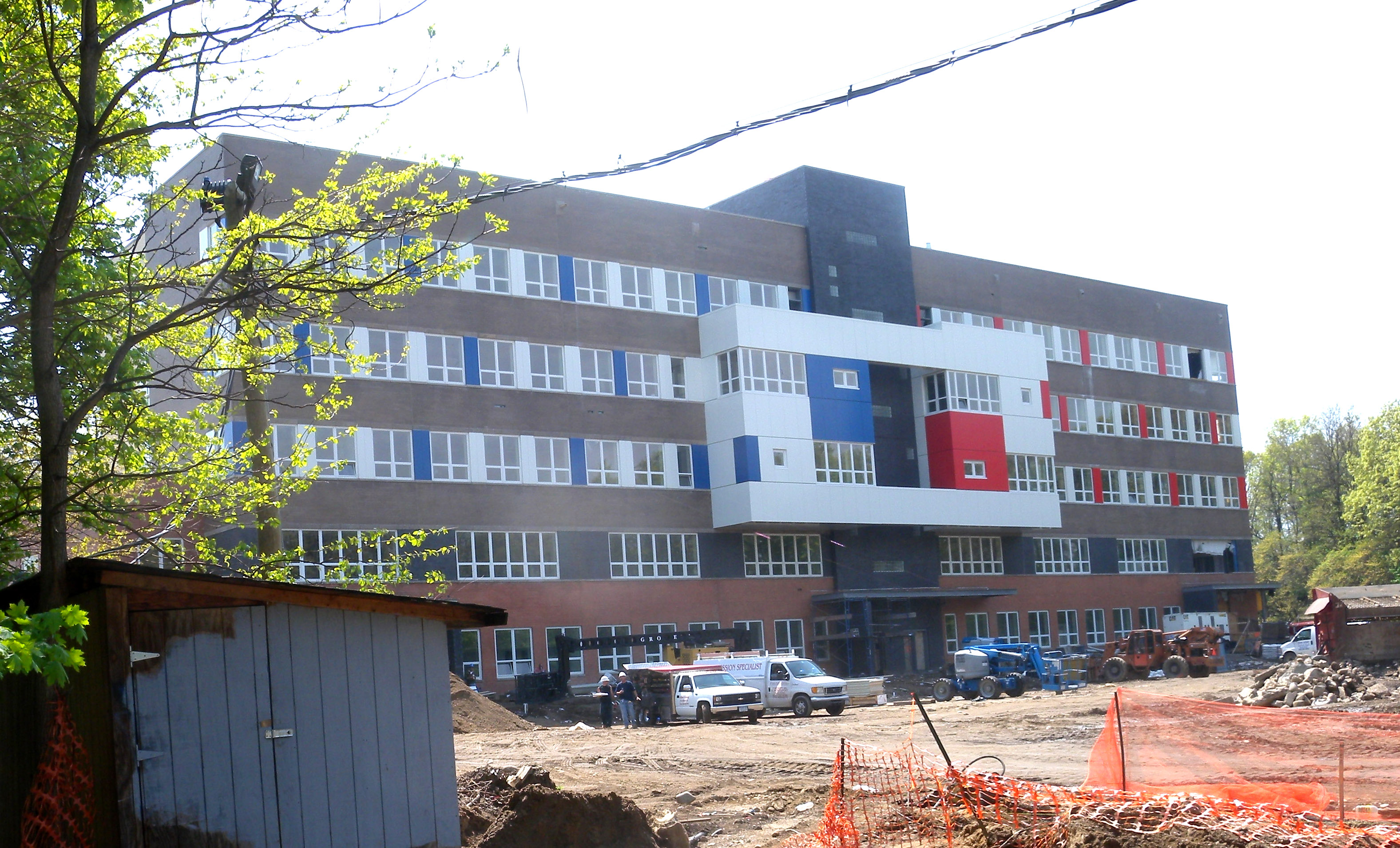
- under construction (Fall 2010)

Location
- 91-30 Metropolitan Avenue, Forest Hills, NY 11375; New York City, New York; United States

Information
- Type: Public
- Motto: "Who am I, Who Do I Want To Be, How do I Get There"
- Established: September 8, 2010
- School board: New York City Public Schools
- School district: 24 and 28
- School number: 28Q686
- Principal: Saida Rodriguez-Tabone
- Grades: 9–12
- Enrollment: 1130
- Campus: Metropolitan Avenue Educational Campus
- Colors: Red, White & Blue
- Mascot: Knights
- Nickname: QMHS; Queens Metro
- Newspaper: Inside Metro
- Website: queensmetro.com

Queens Metropolitan High School (QMHS) is a public high school in Forest Hills in Queens, New York. It is generally referred to simply as "QMHS," "Metro", or just "'Queens Metro" by the students. It is on the south side of Metropolitan Avenue in the Metropolitan Avenue Educational Campus at 91-30 Metropolitan Avenue, between a former Long Island Rail Road branch and 69th Avenue.

A zoned school, the site is at the southern edge of Forest Hills, about 2.98 kilometres (1.85 mi) from Forest Hills High School, is a block from the southern perimeter of Rego Park and two blocks east of the eastern edge of Glendale.

In addition to those neighborhoods, the school serves the neighborhoods of Corona, Elmhurst, Maspeth, Middle Village, Ridgewood, Jamaica, and Kew Gardens. With a student body of over 1,000. Queens Metropolitan High School is a college preparatory school.

Queens Metropolitan High School was awarded the 2018 silver medal from the US News. These schools are ranked based on their performance on state-required tests and how well they prepare students for college. This school has also been rated as one of the best schools by Niche 2018.

According to Niche:

- Queens Metropolitan High School is ranked #93 out of the 1,383 most diverse public schools in New York.
- Queens Metropolitan High School is ranked #119 among the 1,212 schools with the best public-school teachers.
- 96% of students are proficient in Math and Reading.

== Campus ==
Queens Metropolitan High School is housed in the Metropolitan Educational Campus, located on the south side of Metropolitan Avenue just east of Woodhaven Boulevard. This block, which it shares with a shopping center, was formerly an industrial superblock. The campus is built between the currently inactive Rockaway Beach Branch and freight-only Montauk Branch of the Long Island Rail Road, on the site where tracks from the Montauk Branch formerly curved north onto the Rockaway Branch towards the Main Line, and adjacent to the former Parkside station. The original plans called for the building to accommodate two primary or middle schools and two 500-seat high schools, adding over 2,000 Queens public school seats in total. As constructed, the campus added 1,911 seats.

QMHS shares the building space with Metropolitan Expeditionary Learning School, a grade 6 to 12 school. The campus also hosted the new Maspeth High School, until environmental safety issues at that site allowed the formal opening of that school in 2012.

There are two entrances: the well known one on Metropolitan Avenue, and the lesser known one behind the school near Union Turnpike. Each school has its own facilities, including classrooms, libraries, and cafeterias. QHMS has two cafeterias (Red and Blue) and two gyms. The campus' auditorium is shared with MELS (Metropolitan Expeditionary Learning School).

== History ==
The campus was officially proposed in 2005, although proposals had been in the works for nearly two decades. The campus was proposed to alleviate overcrowding in several area schools, particularly Forest Hills High School, and due to the lack of high school facilities in the Glendale, Ridgewood, and Maspeth areas of School District 24. Construction was planned to begin in the summer of 2005, with the facility opening in time for the fall of 2010.

Construction began in 2006, and the building was completed prior to the 2010–2011 academic year. In September of that year, Queens Metropolitan High School (which had not been named prior to 2010) opened its doors to 350 students, with plans to eventually reach a 1,000 student body.

In 2014, the school had a four-year graduation rate of 89%, and high quality review ratings.
