= Grand Street station (LIRR Main Line) =

Train station in New York City (1913–25)

Grand Street
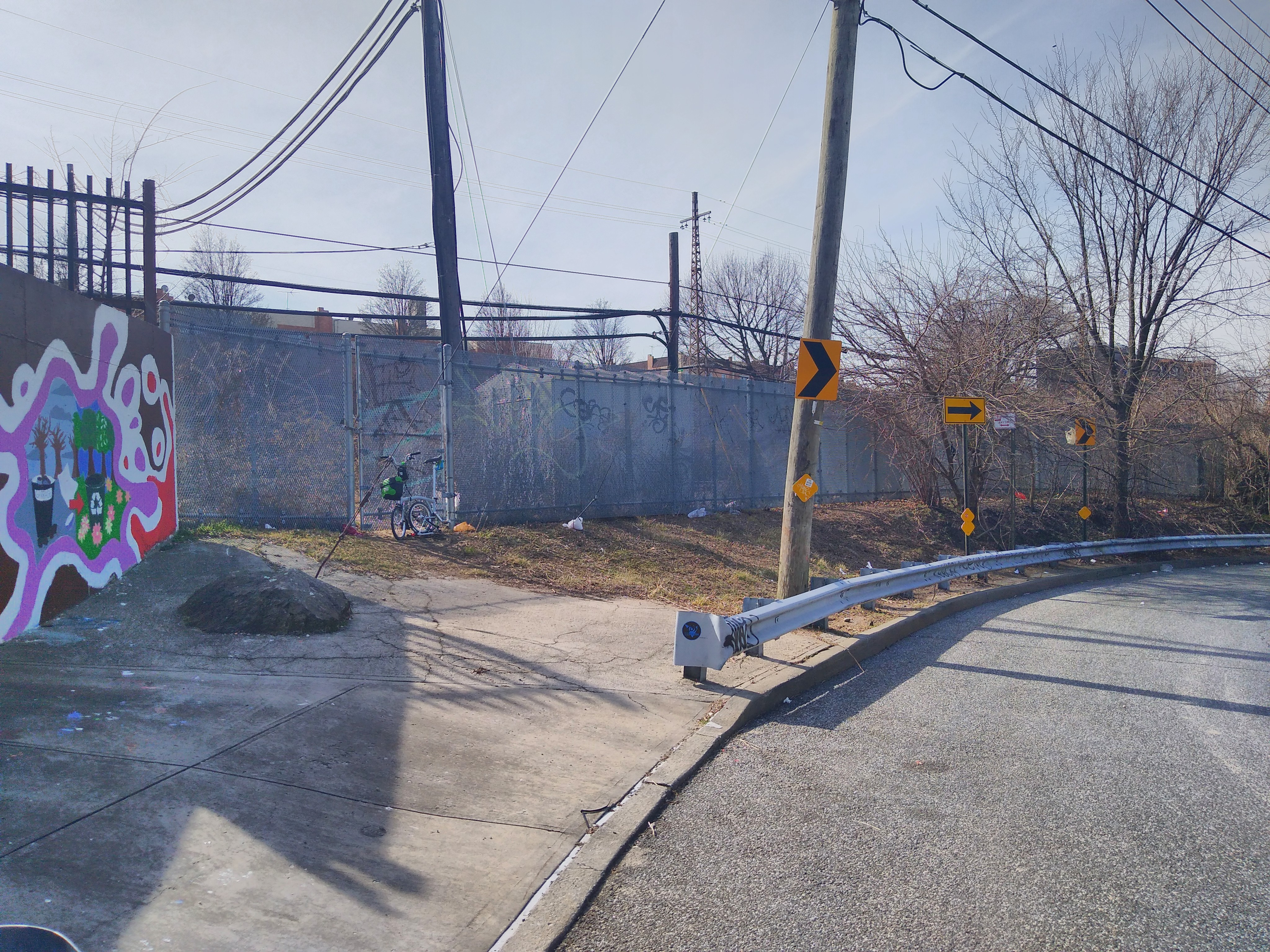
- Former station site in 2020

General information
- Location: Grand and Calamus Avenues; Elmhurst, Queens, New York
- Coordinates: 40°44′1.6″N 73°53′1.2″W
- Owner: Long Island Rail Road
- Line: Main Line
- Platforms: 2 island platforms
- Tracks: 6

Other information
- Fare zone: 1

History
- Opened: 1913
- Closed: 1925
- Electrified: 1905

Former services
Preceding station	Long Island Rail Road	Following station
Winfield Junction toward Long Island City or Penn Station	Main Line	Forest Hills toward Greenport
Terminus	Rockaway Beach Division	Brooklyn Manor toward Gibson or Rockaway Park
Location

Grand Street was a railroad station on the Main Line of the Long Island Rail Road. It stood on Grand Street (now Avenue) in the Elmhurst section of Queens, New York City, west of the present Grand Avenue – Newtown subway station on the IND Queens Boulevard Line. Though it was only operational for 12 years, it served both the Main Line and the Rockaway Beach Branch which broke away from the main line in Rego Park.

The station opened as a pair of sheltered sheds on July 1, 1913, and served both local main line trains and as the original terminus of the Rockaway Beach Branch. The sheds were removed in 1922, and it was discontinued as a station stop in 1925. Three years later a new Rego Park Station was built on Whitepot Junction, but it served Rockaway Beach Branch trains exclusively.
