= Forest Hills station (LIRR) =

Long Island Rail Road station in Queens, New York

Forest Hills
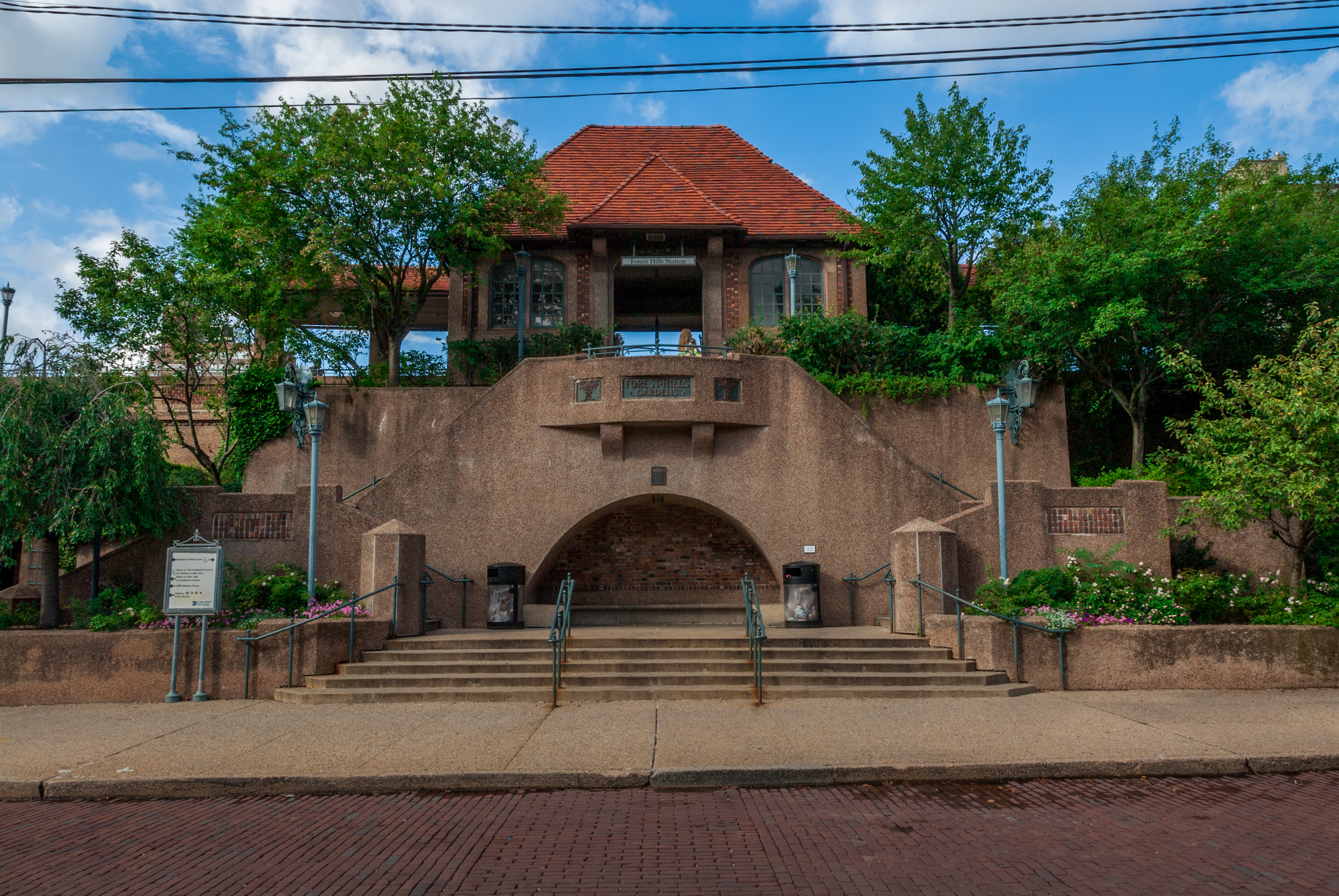
- Forest Hills LIRR station south entrance

General information
- Location: 71st (Continental) Avenue between Austin Street and Burns Street; Forest Hills, Queens, New York
- Coordinates: 40.719483°N 73.844883°W
- Owner: Long Island Rail Road
- Line: Main Line
- Distance: 6.7 mi (10.8 km) from Long Island City
- Platforms: 2 side platforms
- Tracks: 4
- Connections: New York City Subway: at Forest Hills–71st Avenue; MTA Bus: Q23, Q60, Q64, Q74, QM4, QM11, QM12, QM18, QM42, QM44

Construction
- Accessible: ADA Accessible-Yes 2 Ramps are present at Forest Hills, one for each platform.

Other information
- Station code: FHL
- Fare zone: 1

History
- Opened: 1906; 120 years ago
- Closed: 1911; 115 years ago
- Rebuilt: August 5, 1911; 115 years ago
- Electrified: June 16, 1910; 750 V (DC) third rail

Passengers
- 2017: 1,967

Services
Preceding station	Long Island Rail Road	Following station
Woodside toward Penn Station or Grand Central	Hempstead Branch Peak periods only	Kew Gardens toward Hempstead
Woodside toward Penn Station or Grand Central	Ronkonkoma Branch Peak periods only	Kew Gardens toward Ronkonkoma
Woodside toward Penn Station or Grand Central	Far Rockaway Branch Peak periods only	Kew Gardens toward Far Rockaway
Woodside toward Penn Station or Grand Central	Babylon Branch	Kew Gardens toward Babylon
Woodside toward Penn Station or Grand Central	West Hempstead Branch Limited service	Kew Gardens toward West Hempstead
Woodside toward Penn Station or Grand Central	Long Beach Branch Peak periods only	Kew Gardens toward Long Beach
Woodside toward Penn Station or Grand Central	Port Jefferson Branch Limited service (Note: Port Jefferson Line stops here due to construction on the east side of the platform.)	Kew Gardens toward Huntington or Port Jefferson
Oyster Bay Branch does not stop here
Montauk Branch does not stop here
Former services
Preceding station	Long Island Rail Road	Following station
Grand Street toward Long Island City or Penn Station	Main Line	Kew Gardens toward Greenport
Location

The Forest Hills station is a station on the Main Line of the Long Island Rail Road (LIRR), located in the Forest Hills neighborhood of Queens in New York City. It is lightly used compared to other stations in the city, with 2,408 daily riders in 2023; many residents opt for the subway because of its more frequent service and cheaper fares. The station is wheelchair accessible.

== Location ==
Located in the Queens neighborhood of the same name, the station is situated along the elevated LIRR tracks above 71st (Continental) Avenue (Note: Although the avenue's legal name at this location is 71st Avenue, it is co-named Continental Avenue. Addresses north of the station are given 71st Avenue addresses, while addresses south of the station are given Continental Avenue addresses (though the legal name of the avenue is still 71st Avenue).) between Austin and Burns Streets. The station is on the north side of brick-paved Station Square, the historic town center of Forest Hills Gardens, a planned community modelled after the garden communities of England. The station building was constructed in the same Tudor style as the building known as the "Forest Hills Inn" located across Station Square. The station is also just east of the West Side Tennis Club. Two blocks to the north along 71st Avenue is the Forest Hills–71st Avenue subway station, one of the busiest in Queens.

== History ==
Built in 1906, the Forest Hills station is one of the oldest operating passenger railway stations in New York City, predating IND subway expansion to the area in the mid 1930s. Being subsequently remodeled for handicapped accessibility with ramps, it does not contain the standard blue and white signage. Instead there are plaques and antique signs that complement the surrounding area. On July 4, 1917, former President Theodore Roosevelt made his "Unification Speech" (also known as "100 Percent American") from the steps of this station.

On March 17, 1936, at a hearing of the New York State Transit Commission and the New York State Public Service Commission, the LIRR said that it would seek permission in 1937 to abandon the three stations along the Main Line between Jamaica and Pennsylvania Station—Kew Gardens, Forest Hills, and Woodside. The LIRR had said that it anticipated a loss of annual revenue between $750,000 and $1 million with the opening of the extension of the Independent Subway System's Queens Boulevard Line to Jamaica.

In November 1963, the LIRR announced a plan to shorten the platforms at Forest Hills and Kew Gardens by 300 feet (91 m). The railroad's justification was that ridership at the stations was low, and did not warrant repairing the crumbling concrete. These sections of platforms had been installed in about 1929 to allow the stations to accommodate full-length trains. This move was opposed by civic groups, and resulted in an investigation by the Public Service Commission. However, the platform extensions were removed in 1965 or 1966.

The Metropolitan Transportation Authority (MTA), in its 2010–2014 capital program, proposed lengthening the four-car-long platforms at Forest Hills and Kew Gardens to allow additional train cars to board at the station. The platform extensions would reduce waiting time at the station while allowing for more efficient operations between Jamaica and Penn Station. Although $4.5 million was allocated for the project, the money was ultimately redistributed to other projects. (Note: A revision to the Capital Program from June 2010 does not include the Forest Hills platform extension project.)

On July 26, 2018, it was announced that the LIRR planned to extend the platforms at Kew Gardens and Forest Hills by 200 feet (61 m) to accommodate six-car trains. The platform extensions consisted of fiberglass decking supported by steel scaffolding structures, allowing the extensions to be completed quickly, and at a low cost, while allowing the LIRR to plan a solution for permanent platform extensions. Preparation work began during the week of July 23 and the new extensions went into service the week of September 12, 2018.

As part of improvements included in the Metropolitan Transportation Authority's 2020–2024 capital plan, the station will undergo renovations to make it fully accessible. Two ADA-compliant ramps will be constructed to provide access to both platforms, the existing platforms will be demolished and replaced, and lighting and architectural finishes will be upgraded. Additionally, the platforms will receive permanent extensions to accommodate 10-car trains and snow melt systems. The station will receive a new entrance and upgraded facilities. The MTA board awarded contracts for the accessibility upgrades in December 2023, but work on the project was paused in mid-2024 due to the postponement of congestion pricing in New York City, which would have helped fund the renovations. In May 2025, construction began, with the platforms partially closing in the westbound direction.

== Station layout ==
A local station, Forest Hills has two side platforms, both six cars long, and four tracks. The relatively flat and straight stretch of track at Forest Hills has been used for PATH PA-1 and R44 speed tests.

P Platform level	Platform A, side platform
P Platform level	Track 3	← Main Line services toward Penn Station or Grand Central Madison (Woodside)
P Platform level	Track 1	← Main Line services does not stop here →
P Platform level	Track 2	← Main Line services does not stop here →
P Platform level	Track 4	Main Line services toward Jamaica and Points East (Kew Gardens) →
P Platform level	Platform B, side platform
G	Street level	Entrances/exits

== Gallery ==
Forest Hills LIRR station

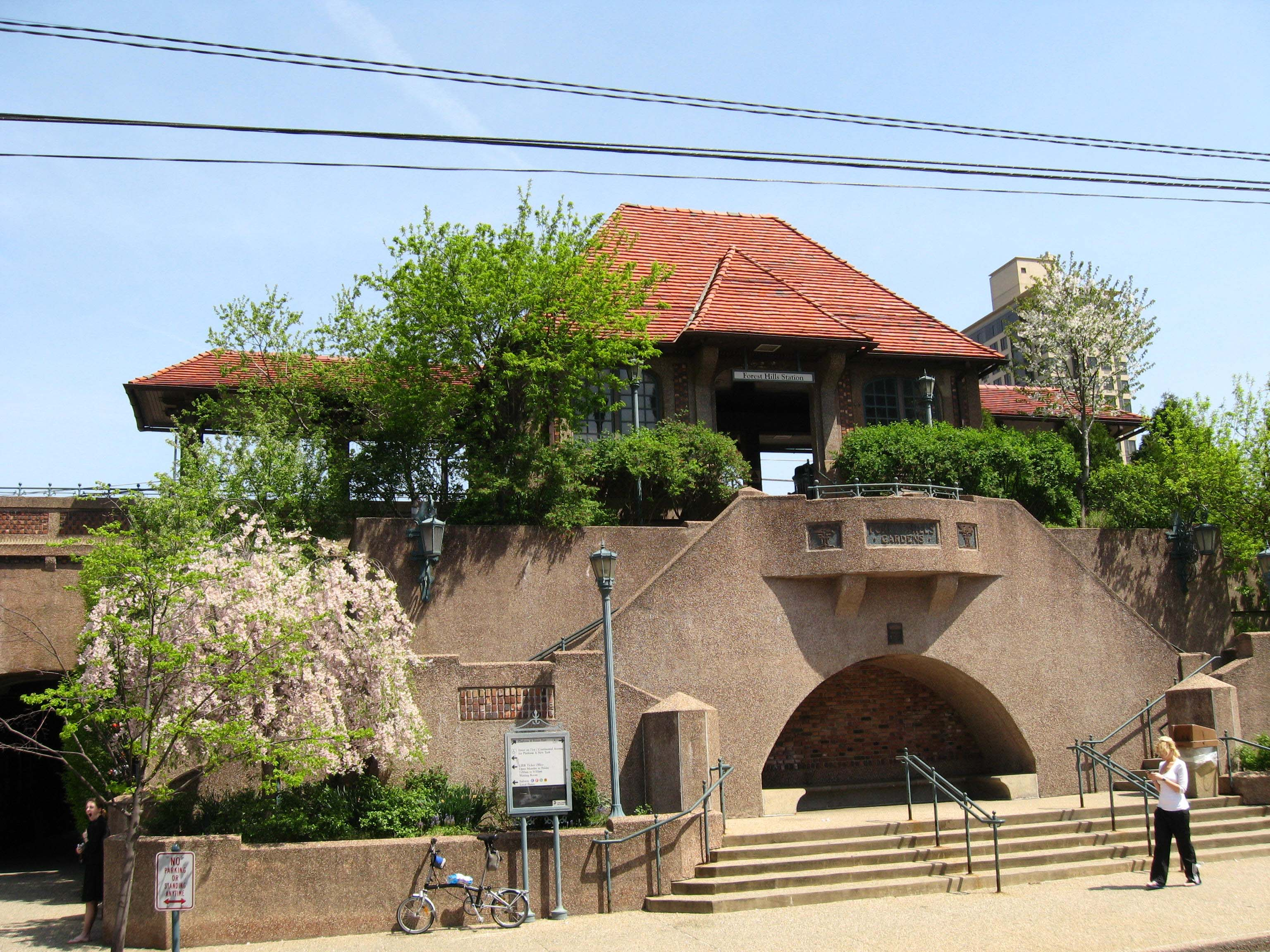
Forest Hills station on the north side of Station Square

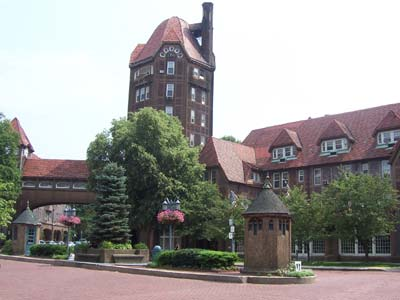
The former Forest Hills Inn on the south side of Station Square

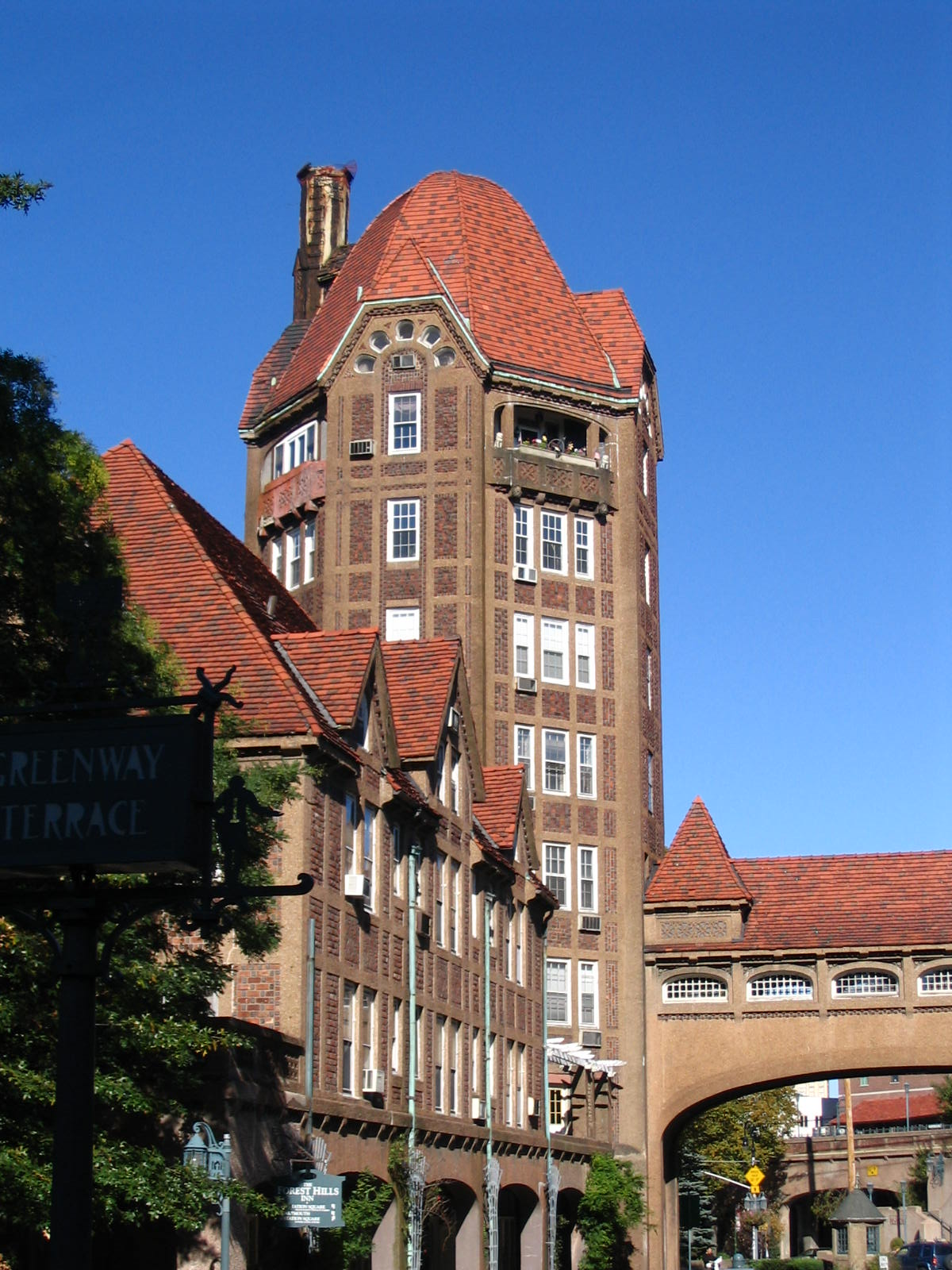
Station Square from Greenway Terrace

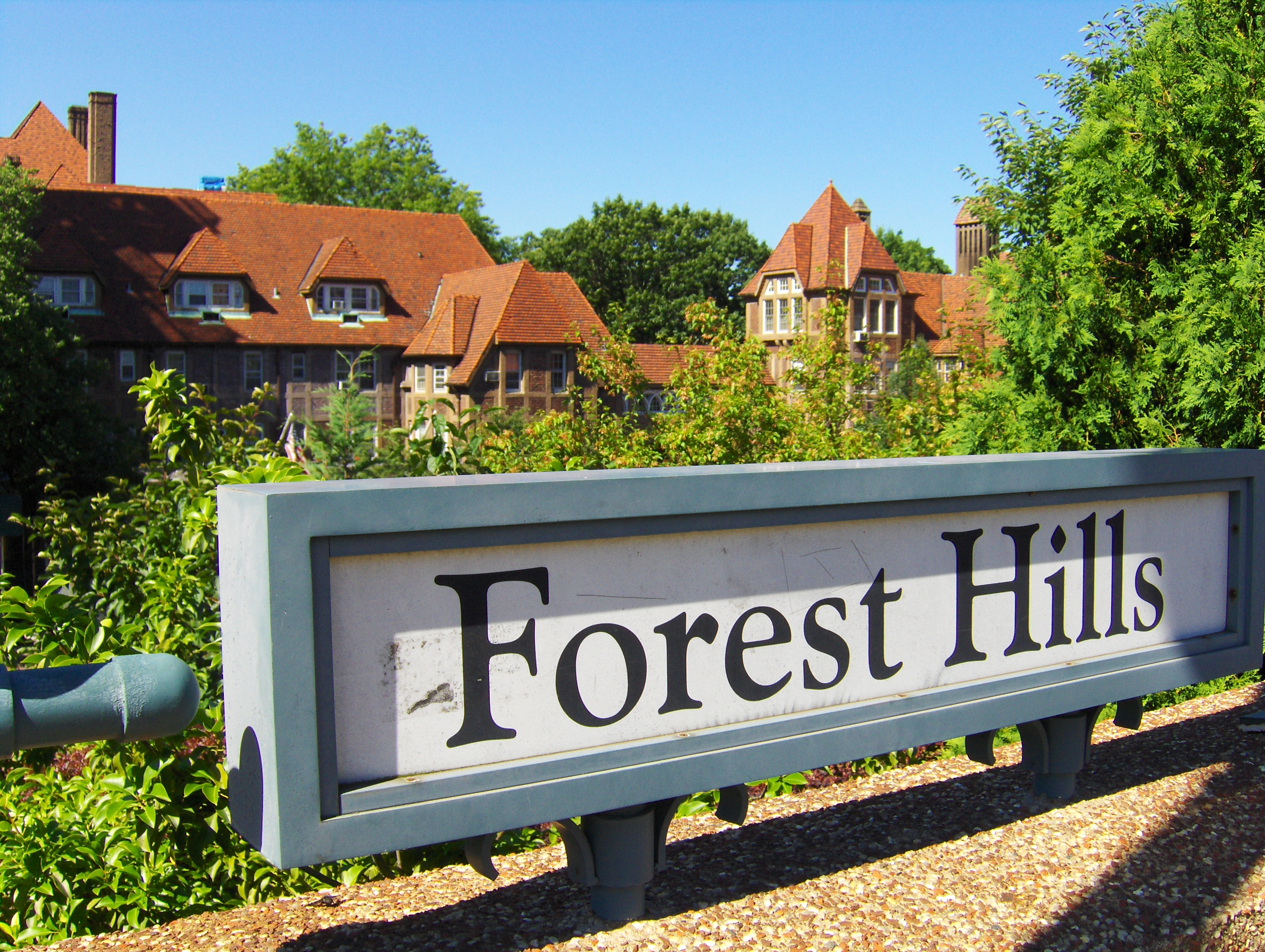
A station sign at the Forest Hills station; this sign design is limited to the Forest Hills station.

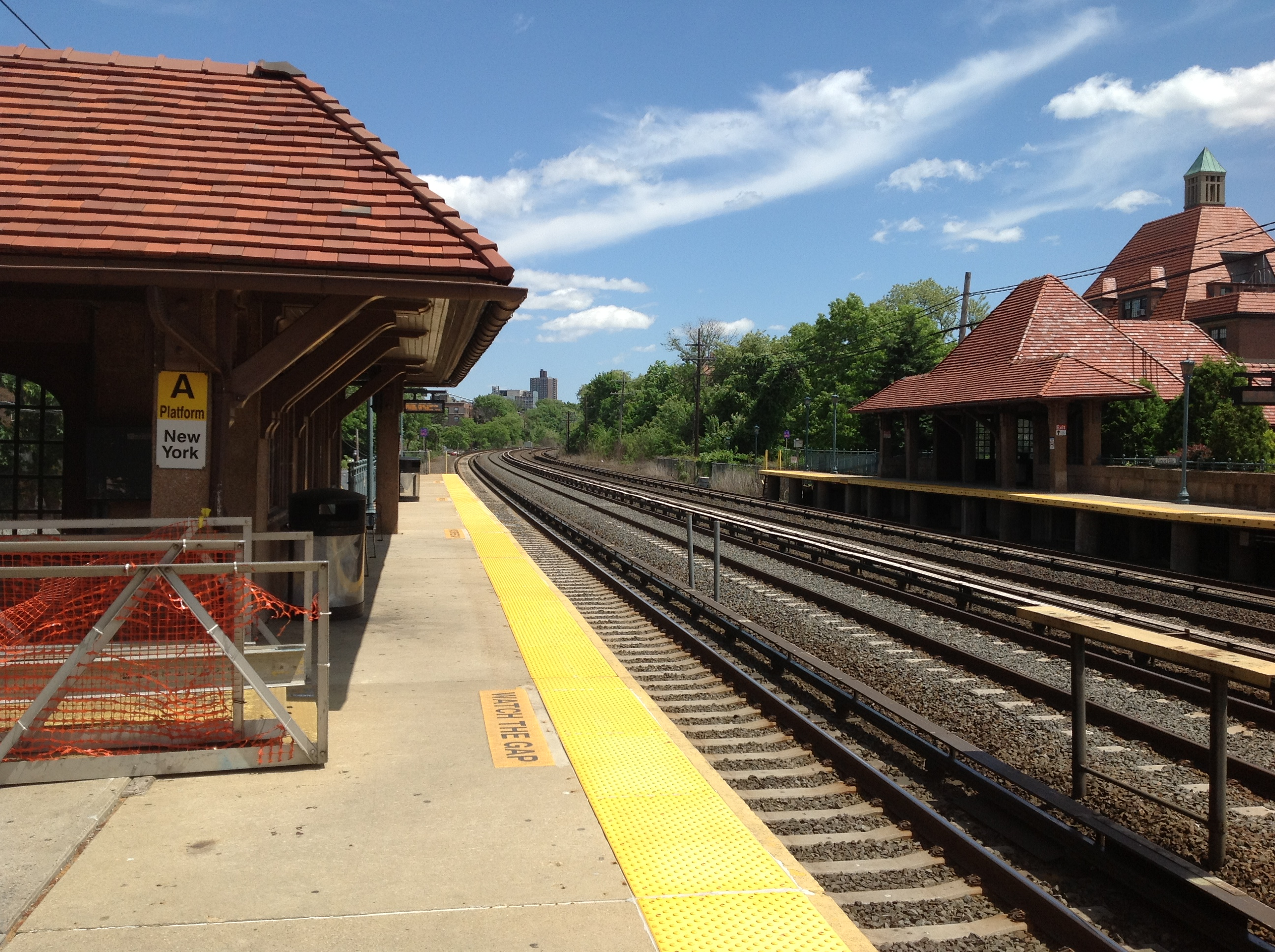
Platform level of station
