= Woodside station (LIRR) =

Long Island Rail Road station in Queens, New York

Woodside
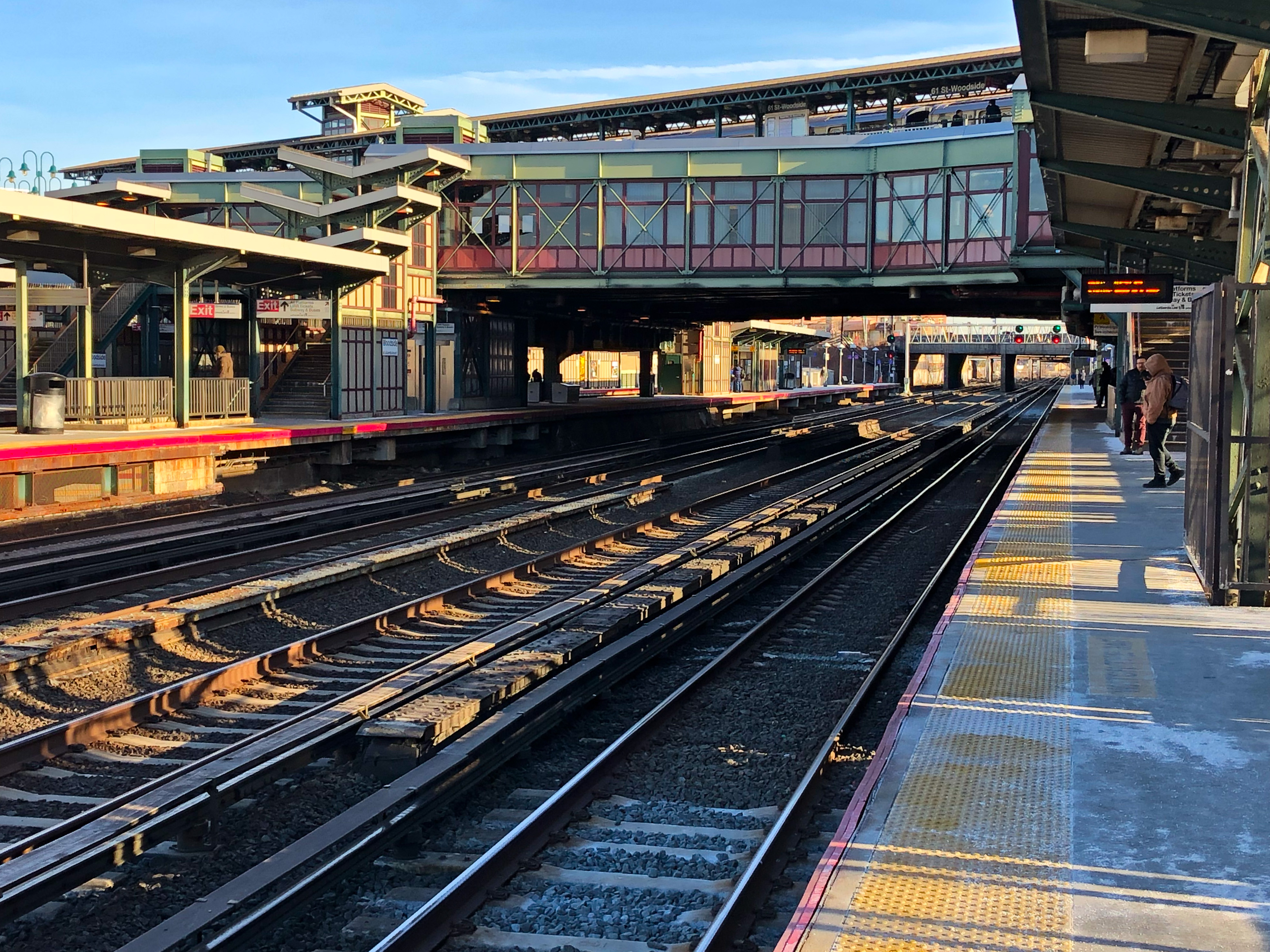
- Looking east from Platform A

General information
- Location: 61st Street and Roosevelt Avenue; Woodside, Queens, New York
- Coordinates: 40.746072°N 73.903201°W
- Owner: Long Island Rail Road
- Lines: Main Line; Port Washington Branch
- Distance: 3.1 mi (5.0 km) from Long Island City
- Platforms: 2 side platforms 1 island platform
- Tracks: 6
- Connections: New York City Subway: at 61st Street–Woodside; MTA Bus: Q18, Q32, Q53 SBS, Q70 SBS to LGA

Construction
- Accessible: Yes
- Architect: Urbahn Architects

Other information
- Station code: WDD
- Fare zone: 1

History
- Opened: November 15, 1869; 156 years ago (F&NS)
- Closed: 1914; 112 years ago
- Rebuilt: 1915; 111 years ago, 1999; 27 years ago
- Electrified: 750 V (DC) third rail June 16, 1910; 116 years ago

Passengers
- 2012—2014: 7,172 per weekday
- Rank: 15 of 126

Services
| Preceding station | Long Island Rail Road | Following station |
|---|---|---|
| Penn Station or Grand Central Terminus | Port Washington Branch | Mets–Willets Point toward Port Washington |
| Penn Station or Grand Central Terminus | Hempstead Branch Peak periods only | Forest Hills toward Hempstead |
| Penn Station or Grand Central Terminus | Port Jefferson Branch | Kew Gardens toward Huntington or Port Jefferson |
| Penn Station or Grand Central Terminus | Ronkonkoma Branch | Forest Hills toward Ronkonkoma |
| Penn Station or Grand Central Terminus | Far Rockaway Branch | Forest Hills toward Far Rockaway |
| Penn Station or Grand Central Terminus | Babylon Branch | Forest Hills toward Babylon |
| Penn Station or Grand Central Terminus | West Hempstead Branch Peak periods only | Forest Hills toward West Hempstead |
| Penn Station or Grand Central Terminus | Long Beach Branch | Forest Hills toward Long Beach |
| Penn Station or Grand Central Terminus | Belmont Park Branch special events | Jamaica toward Belmont Park |
Oyster Bay Branch does not stop here
Montauk Branch does not stop here
Former services
| Preceding station | Long Island Rail Road | Following station |
|---|---|---|
| Hunterspoint Avenue toward Long Island City | Main Line | Winfield Junction toward Greenport |
| Penn Station Terminus | Main Line | Winfield Junction toward Greenport |
| Terminus | Rockaway Beach Division after 1925 | Rego Park toward Gibson or Rockaway Park |
Location

The Woodside station (signed as Woodside LaGuardia Airport) is a station on the Main Line and Port Washington Branch of the Long Island Rail Road (LIRR), located in the Woodside neighborhood of Queens in New York City. It is the first station passed by eastward trains from Penn Station and Grand Central Madison, and the only station in Queens shared by the Port Washington Branch and other LIRR branches.

East of Woodside, the two-track Port Washington Branch turns northeastward to Mets–Willets Point and points east, while the four-track Main Line continues southeast to Jamaica station.

The station is also the LIRR's main stop for LaGuardia Airport customers, with the Q70 LaGuardia Link SBS running between it and the airport to its north.

== Overview ==
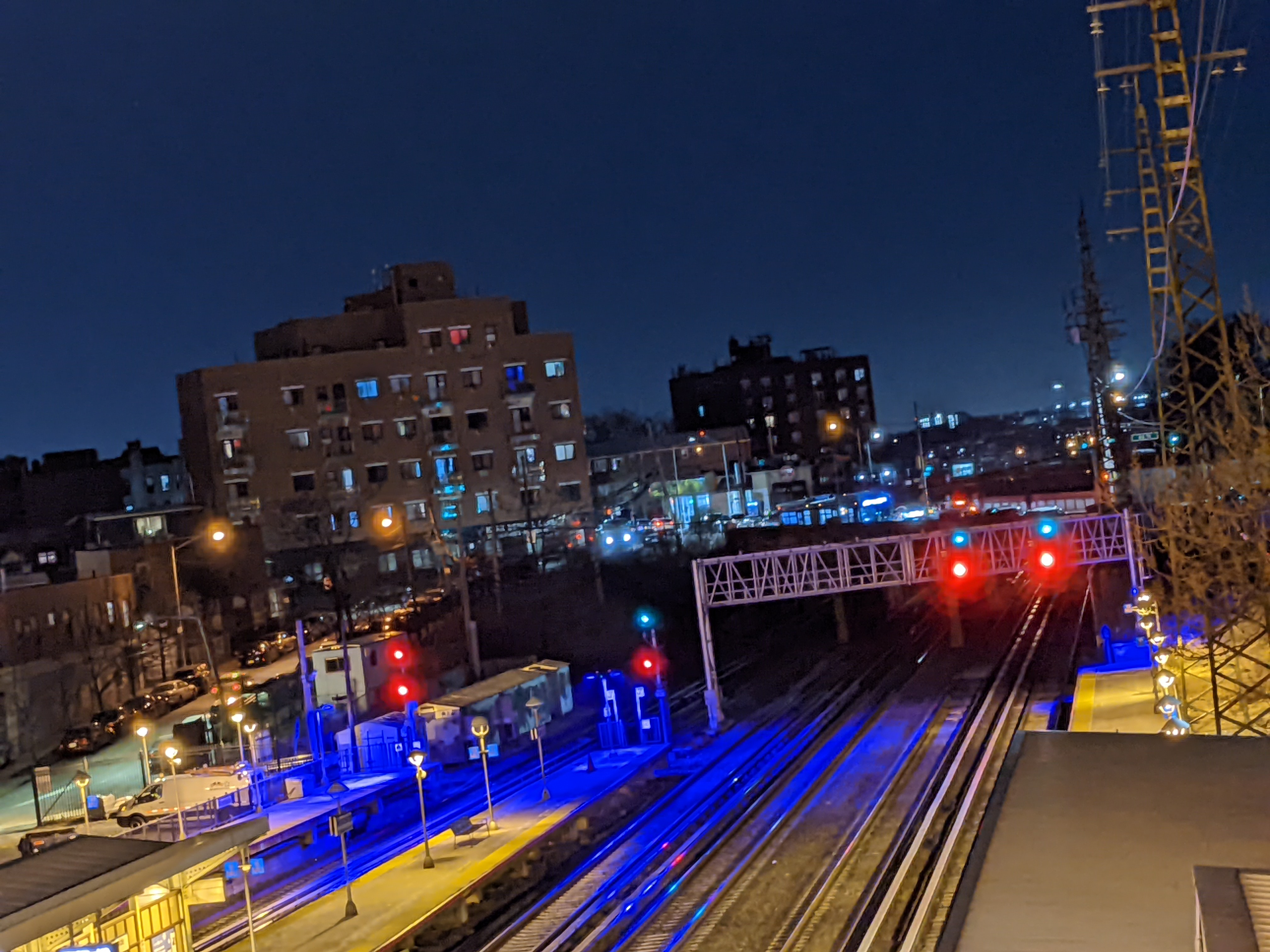
The platforms, looking east from the 61st Street–Woodside station upstairs

Woodside has six tracks and three platforms. The four southernmost tracks passing through the station are the Main Line tracks; the two center tracks on the Main Line are through (express) tracks and do not have platform faces at Woodside. The two northernmost tracks are the Port Washington Branch tracks – both of which have platforms – and are exclusively used by that branch.

West of the station, at Harold Interlocking, the line merges with Amtrak's Hell Gate Bridge access tracks (part of the Northeast Corridor) before entering the East River Tunnels or 63rd Street Tunnel to Manhattan, or taking the Main Line to Hunterspoint Avenue.

The station complex is ADA-accessible via elevators and ramps.

=== Connections ===
The 61st Street–Woodside station of the IRT Flushing Line (served by the 7 and <7> trains) is on the upper level of the station complex, above the LIRR platforms, on a viaduct high above Roosevelt Avenue.

At street level, the Q70 LaGuardia Link SBS bus provides limited-stop service between the station and LaGuardia Airport to the north.

== History ==
=== Early history ===
Woodside originally had two railroad stations. One was built in 1861 on 60th Street by the LIRR subsidiary New York and Jamaica Railroad; the other, larger station was built by the Flushing and North Side Railroad on November 15, 1869, and was the first to be built by the F&NS after acquiring the troubled New York and Flushing Railroad.

For a short period during the 1870s, it served not only the Port Washington Branch but also the Woodside Branch. The Woodside Branch ran across northwestern Queens, had one station at Junction Boulevard and 35th Avenue, and took commuters either to the former Whitestone Branch or to what is today Corona Yard. Like all other stations on Long Island, it was acquired by the Long Island Rail Road in 1876, but in this case the former LIRR-built station was abandoned.

=== 20th century ===
Though the line was electrified on June 16, 1910, the station was closed in 1914 due to a grade elimination project and razed on November 17, 1915. The existing elevated station was opened on October 17, 1915. When Winfield station was closed in 1929, Woodside became the easternmost station served by both Main Line and Port Washington Branch trains (and thus also a transfer point) before the split at Winfield Junction.

On March 17, 1936, at a hearing of the New York State Transit Commission and the New York State Public Service Commission, the LIRR said that it would seek permission in 1937 to abandon the three stations along the Main Line between Jamaica and Pennsylvania Station—Kew Gardens, Forest Hills, and Woodside; this proposal was ultimately rejected. The LIRR had said that it anticipated a loss of annual revenue between $750,000 and $1 million with the opening of the extension of the Independent Subway System's Queens Boulevard Line to Jamaica.

The station underwent a renovation and became ADA-accessible in the 1990s, during which time the platforms were extended to accommodate 12-car trains. The renovated station was designed by Urbahn Architects.

=== 21st century ===
In 2006, an 18-year-old woman died after falling into the gap between the platform and train, and subsequently getting hit by an oncoming passenger train. The death resulted in the LIRR and Metro-North Railroad implementing an aggressive platform gap mitigation platform conductor personnel, and "Watch the gap" programs.

In the 2020s, portions of the station complex underwent renovations, with the mezzanine and subway station above the LIRR receiving extensive repairs and upgrades.

== Station layout ==
This station has three 12-car long high-level platforms. The northern one, a side platform (Platform C) next to Track 1 of the Port Washington Branch, is generally used by westbound or Manhattan-bound trains. The central one, an island platform (Platform B) between Track 2 of the Port Washington Branch and Track 3 of the Main Line, is generally used by eastbound or outbound Port Washington trains and westbound or Manhattan-bound Main Line trains. The southern one, a side platform (Platform A) next to Track 4 of the Main Line, is generally used by outbound or eastbound Main Line trains.

The same platforms, looking west from the Manhattan-bound 7 train platform

There are six tracks. Tracks 1 and 2 of the Main Line, which are not adjacent to any platform, are used by non-stopping trains.

3F
Subway platforms
Southbound local
← toward 34th Street–Hudson Yards (52nd Street)
Island platform
Peak-direction express
← AM rush toward 34th Street–Hudson Yards (Queensboro Plaza)
PM rush/evenings toward Flushing–Main Street (Junction Boulevard) →
Island platform
Northbound local
toward Flushing–Main Street (69th Street) →
2F
Mezzanine
Connection between subway and LIRR, station agent, OMNY machines
Multiple accessible entrances:
- Elevator at northeast corner of Roosevelt Avenue and 61st Street
- Ramp to westbound Port Washington Branch platform from 63rd Street and Trimble Road
- Ramp to eastbound Main Line platform from dead end at 62nd Street near Woodside Avenue
1F
LIRR platforms
Platform C, side platform
Track 1
← Port Washington Branch toward Penn Station or Grand Central Madison (Terminus)
Track 2
Port Washington Branch toward Great Neck or Port Washington (Mets–Willets Point) →
Platform B, island platform
Track 3
← Main Line services toward Penn Station or Grand Central Madison (Terminus)
Track 1
← Main Line services do not stop here →
Track 2
← Main Line services do not stop here →
Track 4
Main Line services toward Jamaica and Points East (Forest Hills) →
Platform A, side platform
G
Street level
Entrances/exits

== See also ==
- List of Long Island Rail Road stations
- Ronkonkoma station – Another LIRR station serving an airport
