= Metropolitan Avenue =

Avenue in Brooklyn and Queens, New York

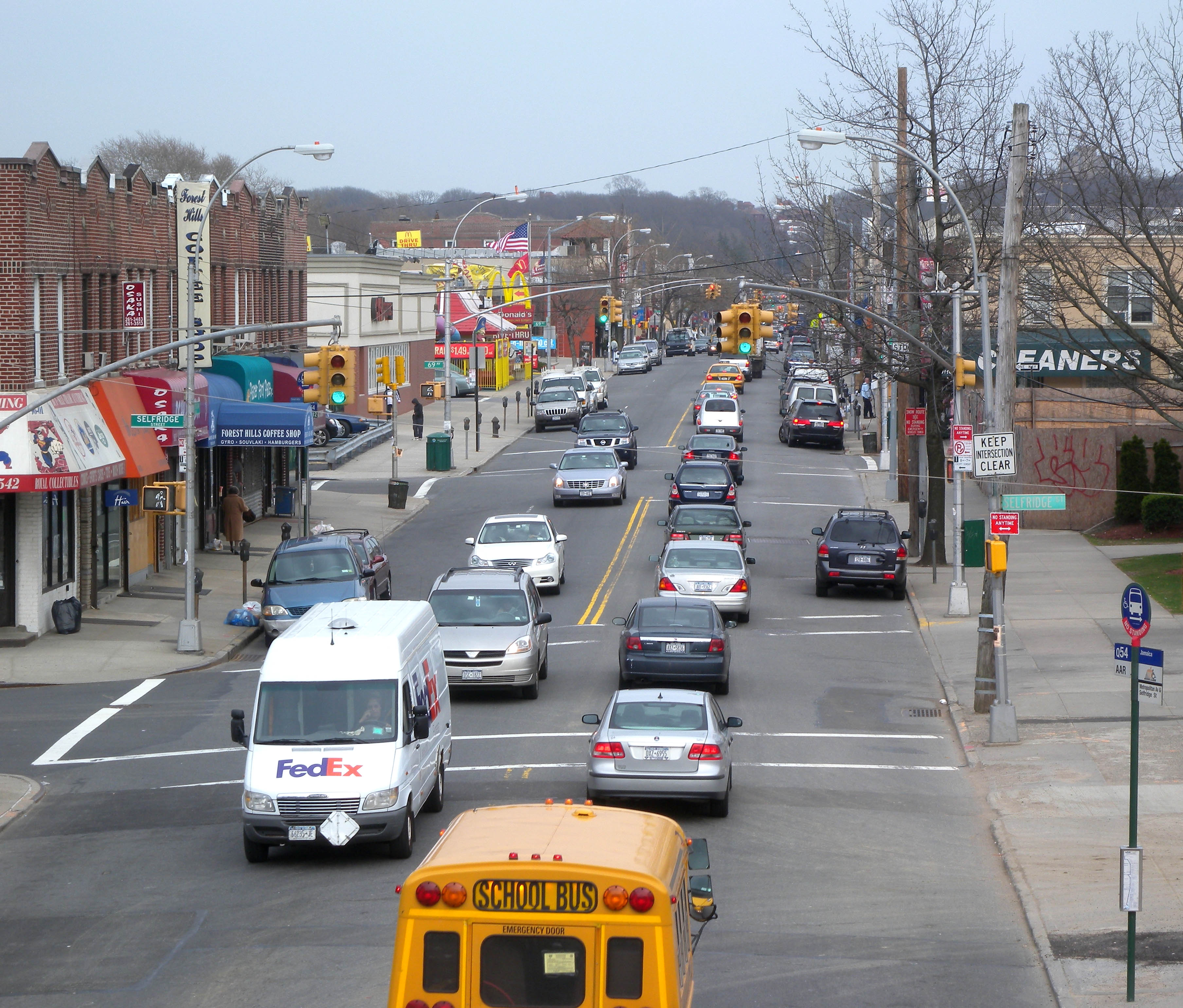
Forest Hills

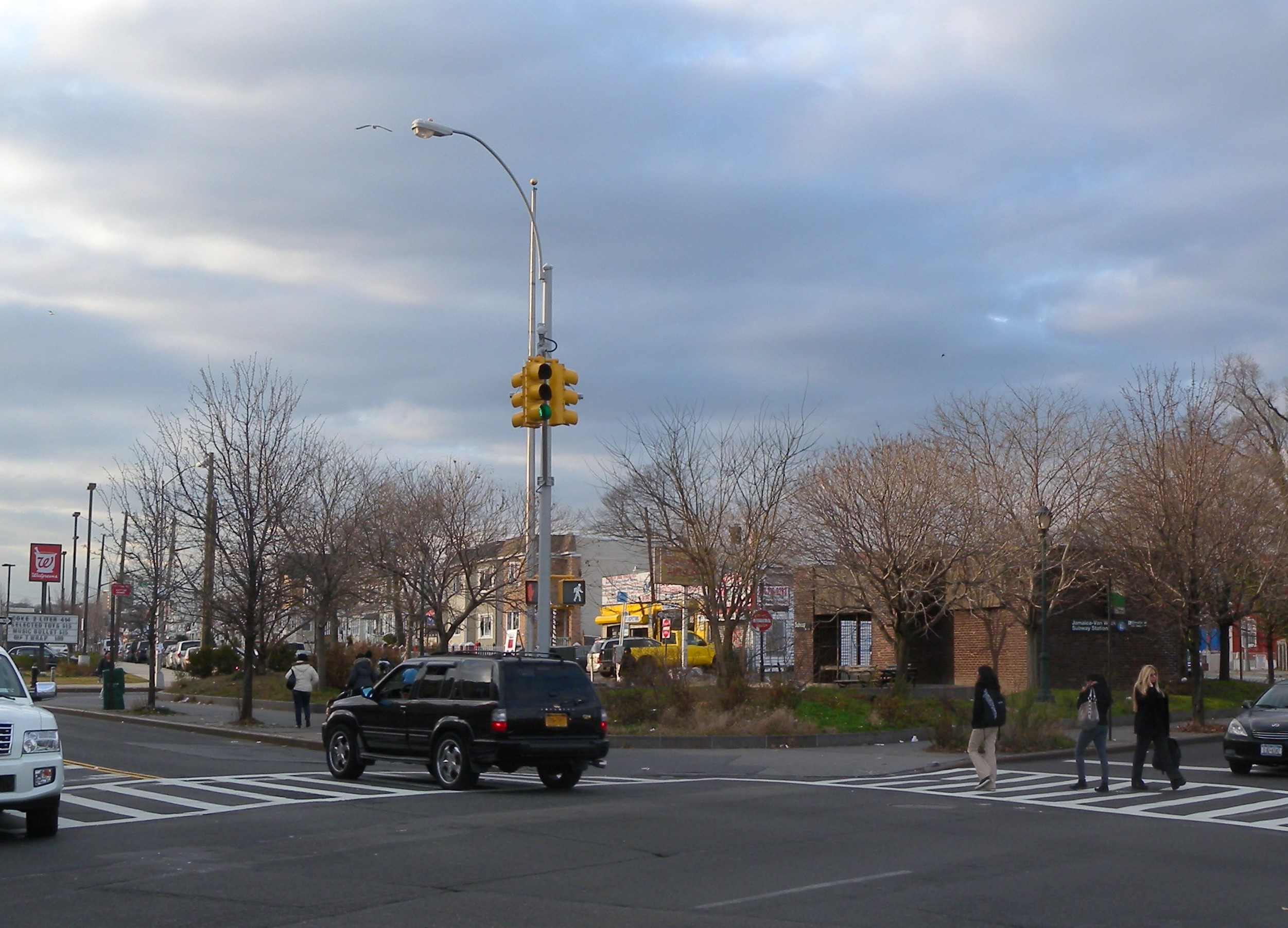
Eastern end, Jamaica Avenue

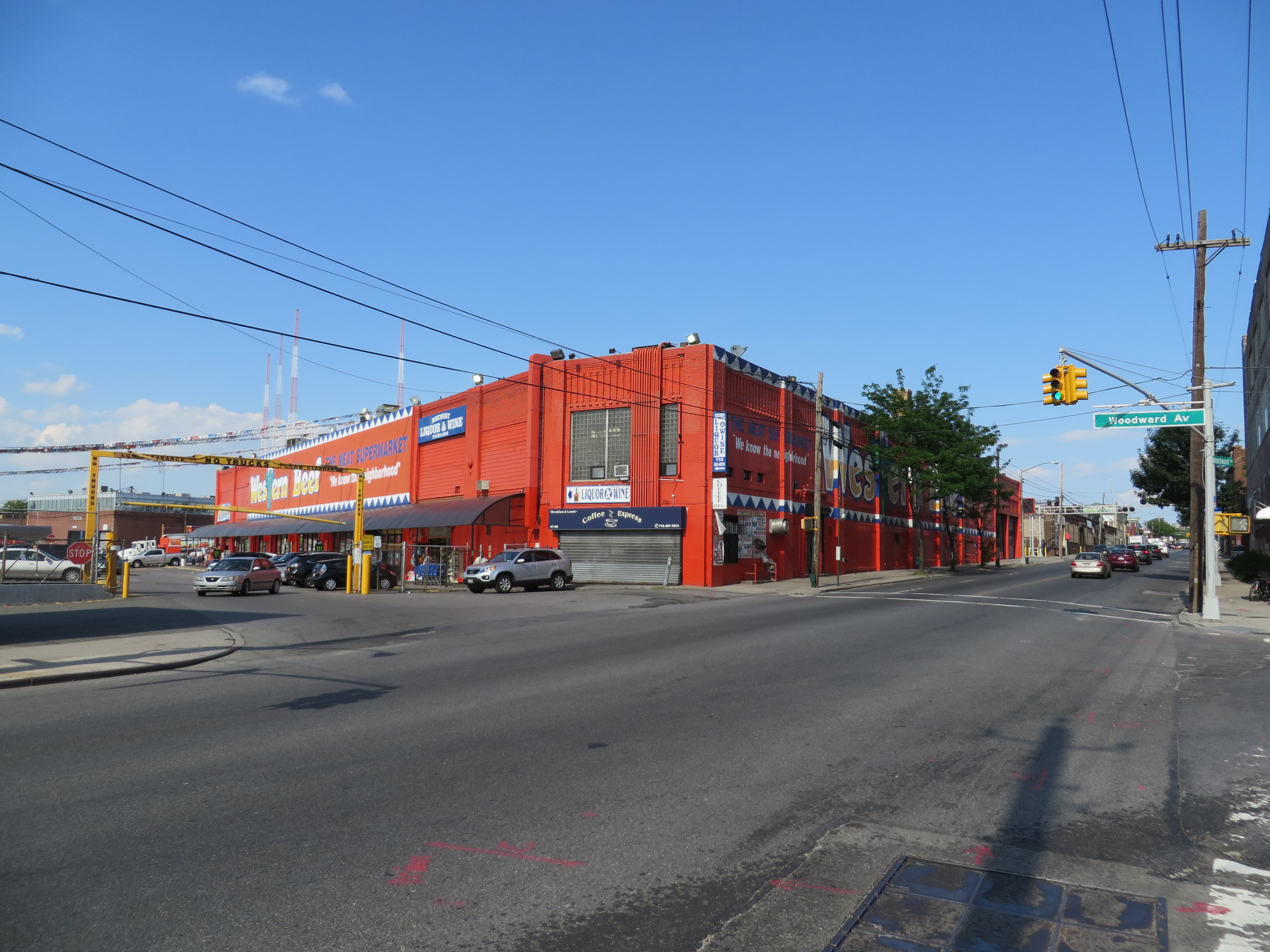
Ridgewood, Queens

Metropolitan Avenue is a major east-west street in Queens and northern Brooklyn, New York City. Its western end is at the East River in Williamsburg, Brooklyn, and the eastern end at Jamaica Avenue in Jamaica, Queens. The avenue was constructed in 1816 as the Williamsburgh and Jamaica Turnpike, though previously it served as an Indian trail.

There are also streets named Metropolitan Avenue in Staten Island and the Bronx.

== History ==
In 1814, the Williamsburgh Turnpike Company was chartered to upgrade an old Indian trail from Jamaica to the East River into a road, and their work was carried out in 1816. Locally known as the Williamsburgh and Jamaica Turnpike, what became Metropolitan Avenue was a toll road which connected the then villages of Williamsburgh (as it was originally spelled) and Jamaica, New York. The road became a farmer's and stage coach route to the Williamsburgh ferries across the East River to Manhattan. The easternmost segment of the present avenue in Williamsburg initially had several names before it was joined to Metropolitan Avenue circa 1858: Bushwick Street, then Woodhull Street, and, later, North Second Street. The City of Brooklyn acquired Metropolitan Avenue from the Williamsburgh Turnpike Road Company in 1872. Several of the neighborhoods through which it passes originated as villages along its length.

== Route description ==
Metropolitan Avenue runs mainly through the neighborhoods of Williamsburg and East Williamsburg in Brooklyn and Ridgewood, Maspeth, Middle Village, Glendale, Forest Hills, Kew Gardens, Richmond Hill and Jamaica in Queens. The avenue, which ranges between four and six lanes wide, marks the northern borders of Ridgewood and Glendale and the southern border of Maspeth; it also splits Middle Village and passes through Forest Park. The street is 7.9 miles (12.7 km) long.

== Transportation ==
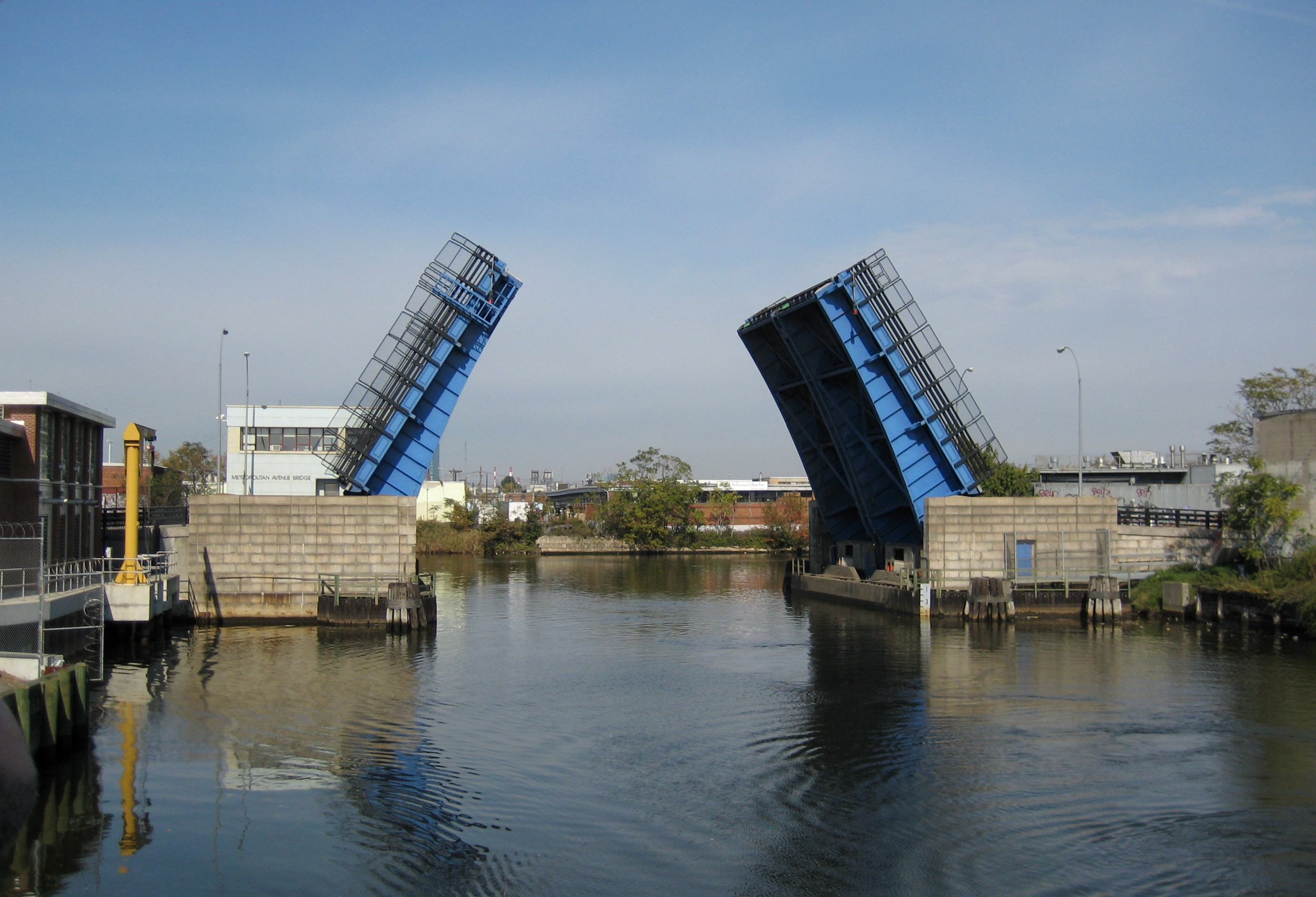
The Metropolitan Avenue Bridge over Newtown Creek with its bascule spans opened

Metropolitan Avenue is served by the following subway stations:

- Metropolitan Avenue on the IND Crosstown Line (G train)
- Lorimer Street and Graham Avenue on the BMT Canarsie Line (L train)
- Middle Village – Metropolitan Avenue on the BMT Myrtle Avenue Line (M train)
- Jamaica – Van Wyck on the IND Archer Avenue Line (E train)

It is also served by the following bus routes:

- The Q54 bus runs along most of the avenue, between Grand Street and either 131st Street (Williamsburg) or 132nd Street (Jamaica). It doesn’t pass through St. John’s Cemetery.
- The Q59 runs between Roebling Street and Union Avenue.
- The B24 runs between Bushwick Avenue and either Rodney Street (Greenpoint), or Marcy Avenue (Williamsburg).
- Some B38 local buses head to Metropolitan Avenue, then run east from Starr Street to Grandview Avenue while in service to Downtown Brooklyn. The B38 Limited doesn’t serve any portion.
- The Q14 and Q39 run between Forest and Eliot Avenues.
- The Q38 and Q67 run between 69th Street and Fresh Pond Road, where both terminate.
- East Elmhurst-bound Q23 and Forest Hills-bound QM12 and QM42 express buses run from Woodhaven Boulevard to 71st Avenue, where the former heads north and the latter terminate.

The avenue crosses the Long Island Rail Road's Bushwick Branch at one of the busiest level crossings in New York City. (40°42′49.4″N 73°55′10″W)

== Education ==
Queens Metropolitan High School, a public high school, opened in 2010 on the avenue in Forest Hills.

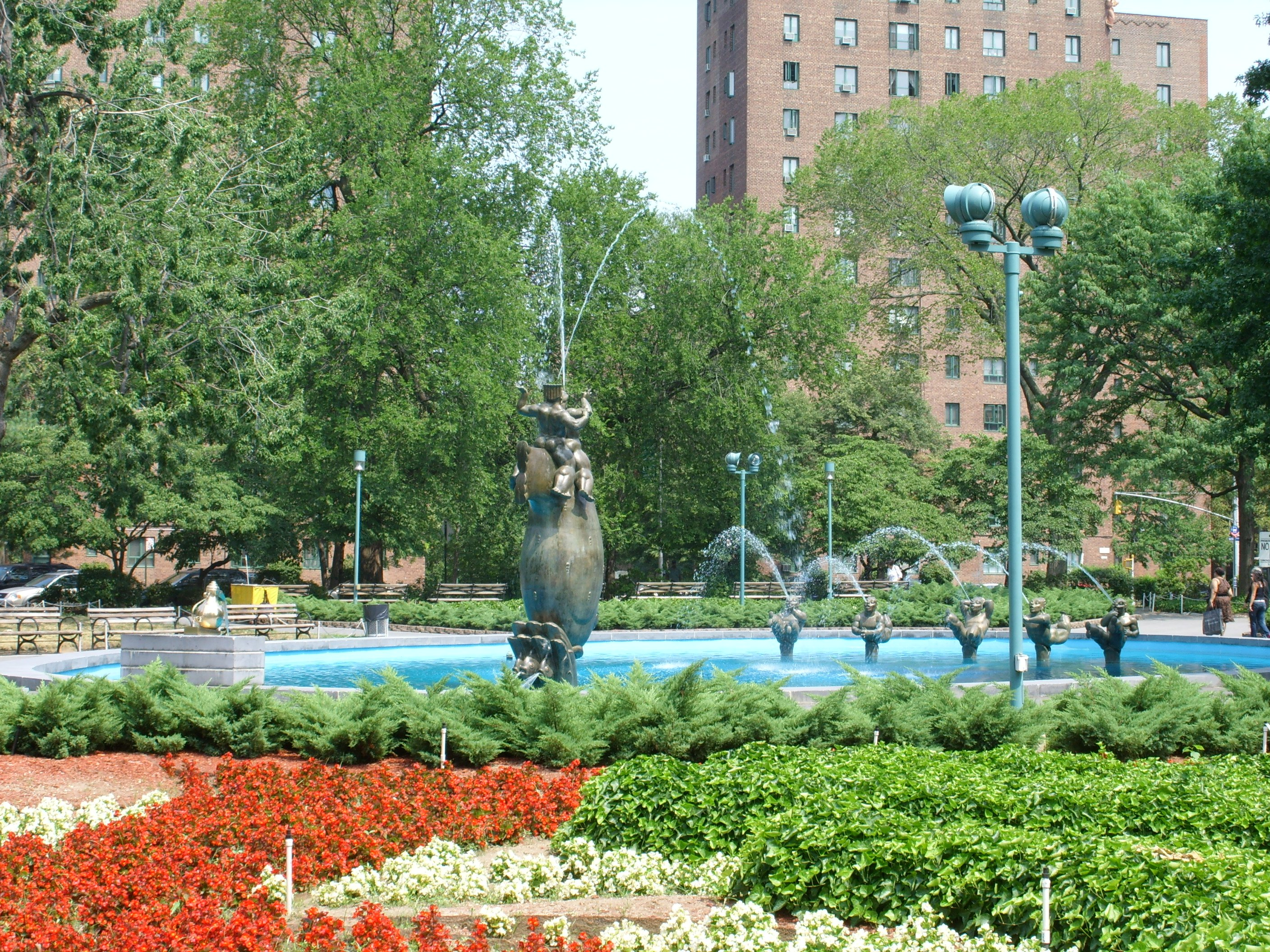
Metropolitan Oval, along Metropolitan Avenue in the Bronx

== Other Metropolitan Avenues ==
Metropolitan Avenue in Parkchester, the Bronx is a boulevard approximately 0.8 miles (1.3 km) long. Aileen B. Ryan Oval, formerly Metropolitan Oval, is halfway along Metropolitan Avenue in the Bronx.

Metropolitan Avenue in Silver Lake, Staten Island, is a side street approximately 0.5 miles (0.80 km) long.
