= Rego Park station (LIRR) =

Train station in New York City (1928–62)

Rego Park
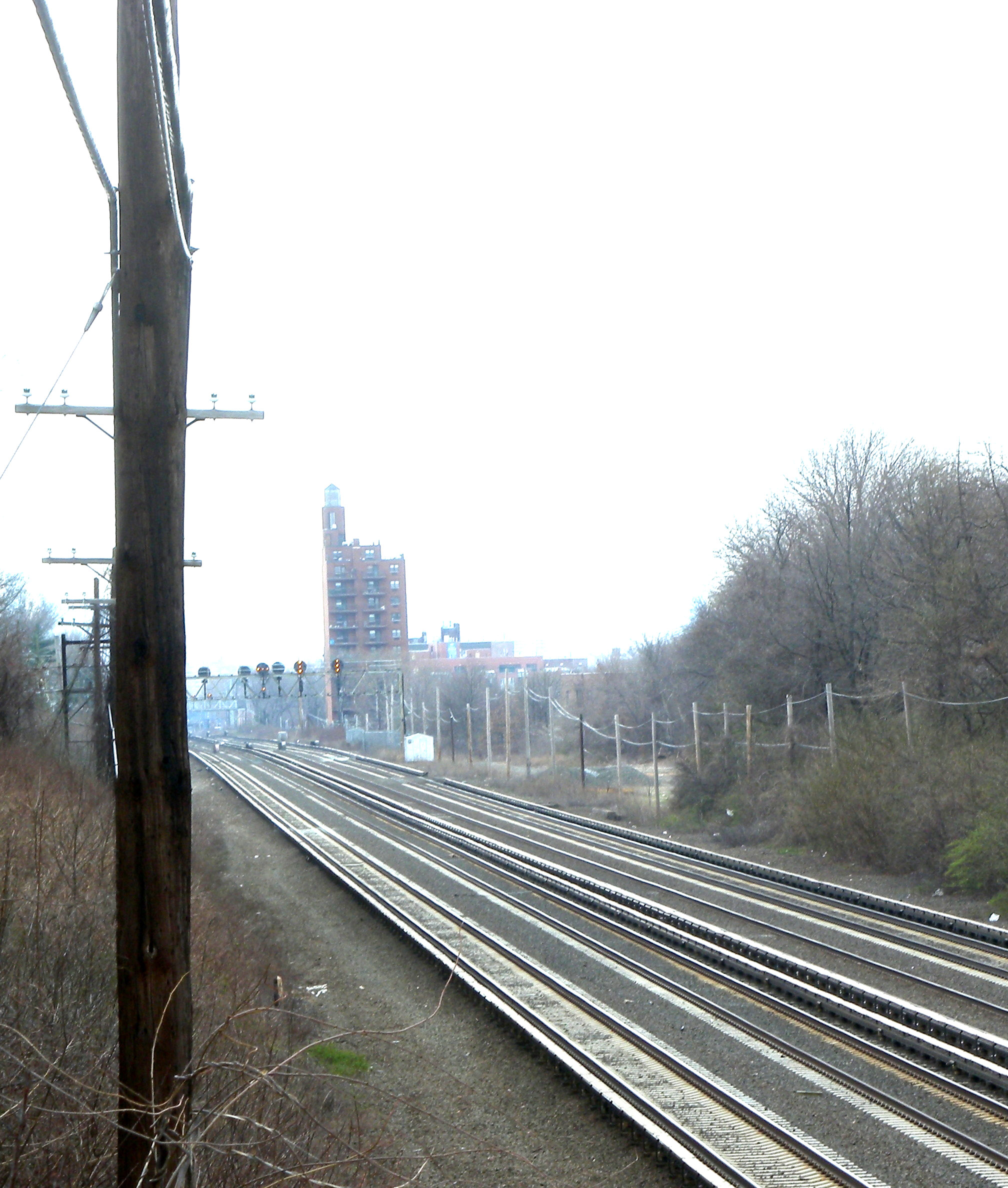
- Site of former Rego Park station

General information
- Location: 63rd Drive; Rego Park, Queens, New York
- Coordinates: 40°43′33″N 73°51′42″W
- Owner: Long Island Rail Road
- Lines: Main Line and Rockaway Beach Branch
- Platforms: 2 side platforms
- Tracks: 6 (when the station was open); 4 (currently)

Other information
- Station code: None
- Fare zone: 1

History
- Opened: May 23, 1928
- Closed: June 8, 1962
- Electrified: 1905

Services
Preceding station	Long Island Rail Road	Following station
Woodside Terminus	Rockaway Beach Division	Parkside toward Gibson or Rockaway Park
Location

Rego Park is a former Long Island Rail Road station. It was made of wood, unlike most other stations that were concrete. The station opened in May 1928 with two side platforms outside the two Rockaway Beach Branch tracks that bracketed the four-track Main Line, so only Rockaway trains stopped there. After the Rockaway Trestle fire in 1950, the line was closed station by station. The station closed on June 8, 1962, one day before the Rockaway Beach Branch was abandoned. Nothing remains at the site today.

== Station layout ==
The station, located on the west side of 63rd Drive, had two high-level side platforms, located at the north and south ends of the six-track Main Line right-of-way. The platforms only served the Rockaway Beach Branch, which used the outer two tracks. The platforms were constructed of wood with concrete bases, and featuring shelters along the platform. A single staircase from the east end of each platform went down to 63rd Drive, and an additional staircase was located at 63rd Avenue (formerly Marion Avenue) from the northbound platform. The 63rd Drive entrance also featured a ticket office and heated waiting room, with restrooms.

== History ==
Prior to the construction of the Rego Park station, two former stations near Whitepot Junction were named Matawok, and were located on both the Main Line and Rockaway Beach Branch. Both stations were named for the Matawok Land Company, which built the neighborhood surrounding the junction known at the time as "Forest Hills West."

=== Matawok Rockaway Beach Line station ===
The first station to be given the name Matawok, near the junction at Rego Park, was located along the Rockaway Beach Branch at Fleet Street on the northeast corner of a bridge over the street. It was opened between 1910 and 1913, although LIRR records of the station show its existence dating back to 1908 and into 1915. Some maps show the station existing as recently as 1922.

=== Matawok Main Line station ===
The other Matawok Station was located along the main line east of Whitepot Junction at 66th Avenue. It was opened on June 25, 1922, and had two platforms along four tracks, and a pedestrian bridge not only over the main line, but also over the Rockaway Beach Branch leading from 64th Road east of Alderton Street. The station closed on May 21, 1925, but the remnants of the station remained for decades.

=== Parkside station ===
In 1927, calls came from the Rego Park community for a new LIRR station at 63rd Drive (originally Penelope Street). This was contrary to the desires of the railroad, who wished to cease further expansion of Queens operations. Construction on the new Rego Park station began on January 30, 1928. The station was a modernized version of the design used at the Parkside station. Initially planned to open on April 1, the station was completed in April, and opened on May 23, 1928. Two parades were held in Rego Park on May 26 to commemorate the opening of the station.

The Rockaway Beach Branch closed on June 8, 1962.

== See also ==
- Rockaway Beach Branch
